= Ghattas =

Ghattas (Arabic: غطاس), sometimes rendered as Gattas or Gattaz, is a name usually borne by Arabic-Speaking Christians from the Middle East. It is derived from the Arabic verb meaning "to submerge in water (or another liquid)", most often encountered as a name among Egyptian Copts and Lebanese Christians with the meaning of "baptism".

== First name ==
- Ghattas Hazim (born 1963), Eastern Orthodox Metropolitan of Baghdad, Kuwait and Dependencies, since 2014

== Surname ==
- Basel Ghattas (born 1956), Lebanese businessman and politician
- Dan Christian Ghattas, intersex activist and university lecturer
- Ignatius Ghattas (1920–1992), bishop of the Melkite Greek Catholic Church. Served as Eparch of Newton.
- Juliana Gattas, Argentine singer of Palestinian origin
- Kim Ghattas (born 1977), journalist
- Maged George Elias Ghattas (born 1949), Egyptian politician, minister
- Marie-Alphonsine Danil Ghattas (1843–1927), Palestinian Christian nun who was canonized
- Rodrigo Gattas (born 1991), Palestinian- Chilean football player
- Stéphanos II Ghattas (1920–2009), cleric of the Coptic Catholic Church. Patriarch of Alexandria from 1986 to 2006.

== See also ==
- Gatta
- Gattaz
