= Republican marches =

Series of rallies across France in 2015

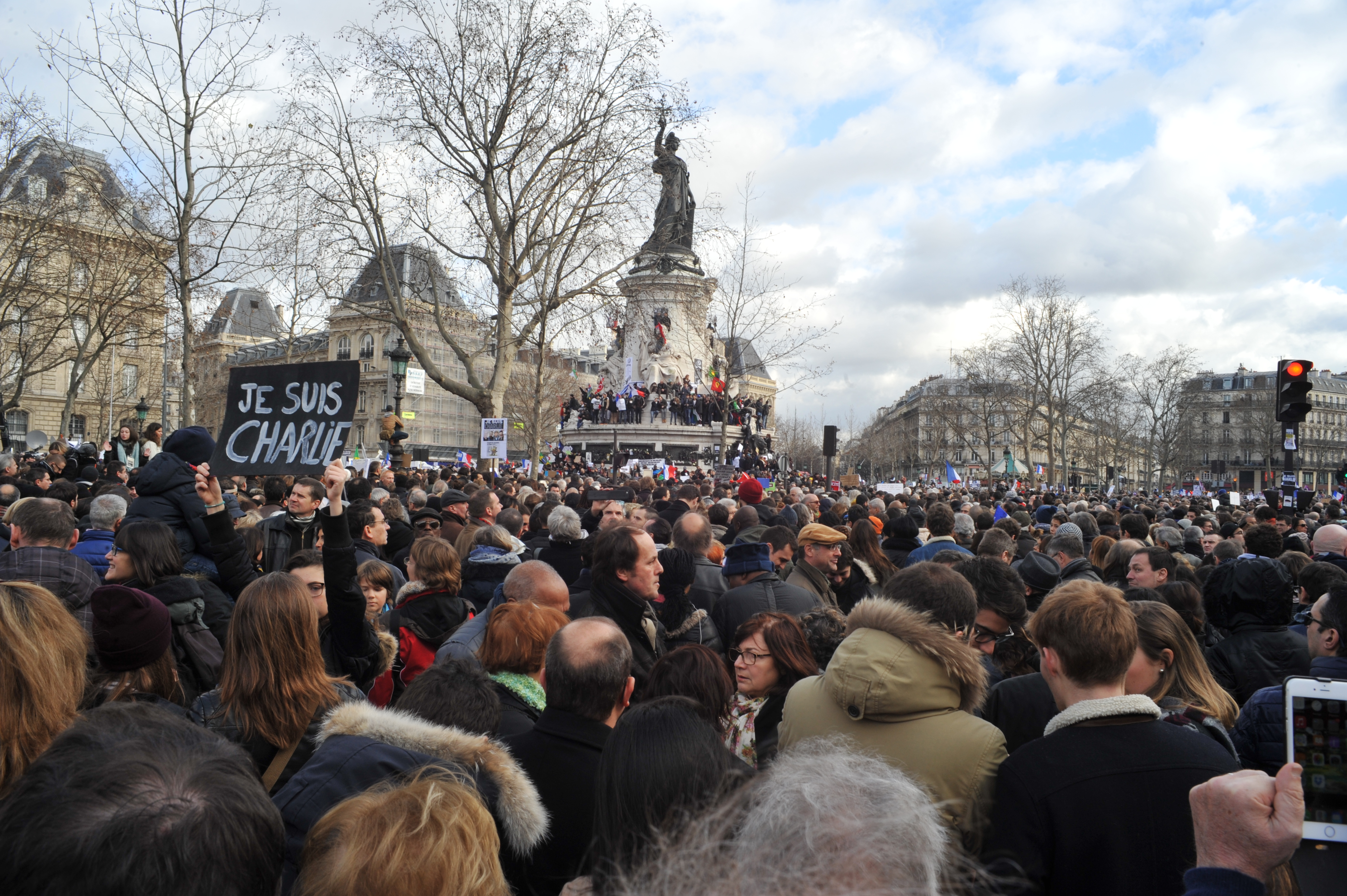
- Demonstrators at the Place de la République, Paris, 11 January 2015
- Date: 10 January 2015 – 11 January 2015
- Location: France, international See: list
- Caused by: Charlie Hebdo shooting (mainly)
- Goals: Fight against terrorism Freedom of speech Freedom of the press
- Methods: Rallies, marches

Number
- 3.7 million in France; 100k+ internationally Attended by over 80 world leaders

The Republican marches (French: Marches républicaines) were a series of rallies that took place in cities across France on 10–11 January 2015 to honour the victims of the Charlie Hebdo shooting, the Montrouge shooting and the Porte de Vincennes siege, as well as to voice support for freedom of speech and freedom of the press. French government officials estimated that the rallies were attended by up to 3.7 million people nationwide, making them the largest public rallies in French history. By their broad appeal, they were the first mass movement of their kind since 1944, when Paris was liberated from the Germans at the end of World War II.

In Paris, due to the expected number of people, three streets were planned for the march from Place de la République to Place de la Nation. It was estimated that between 1.5 and 2 million people marched down and nearby Boulevard Voltaire in Paris. The Paris marches were attended by over 80 world leaders, from both Europe and around the world, including President François Hollande. The presence during the marches of foreign leaders who are accused of not respecting freedom of speech in their own country has been criticised.

In other cities in France, more than 300,000 rallied in Lyon, about a quarter of its population. More than 100,000 marched in the streets of Rennes, Toulouse, Bordeaux, Grenoble, Montpellier and Marseille (within two days). Major rallies took place in Montreal, Brussels, Berlin, Amsterdam and Vienna.

In an interview prior to the Republican marches, cartoonist Luz, one of the survivors of the Charlie Hebdo attack, described the show of support for the magazine as "wonderful", but bemoaned a lack of diversity of views in the public discourse following the attacks, which he said served the purposes of politicians, as well the use of symbols, which he characterised as contrary to the values of the magazine. He noted that, following the attacks, "La Marseillaise" had been sung many times by the public, which his dead colleagues would have scorned. Also speaking prior to the marches, Willem, another surviving cartoonist, said that a demonstration in support of free expression would be "naturally a good thing", but rejected the support of far-right figures such as Marine Le Pen and Geert Wilders: "We vomit on those who suddenly declare that they are our friends".

== Main places ==
=== January 10 ===
==== France ====
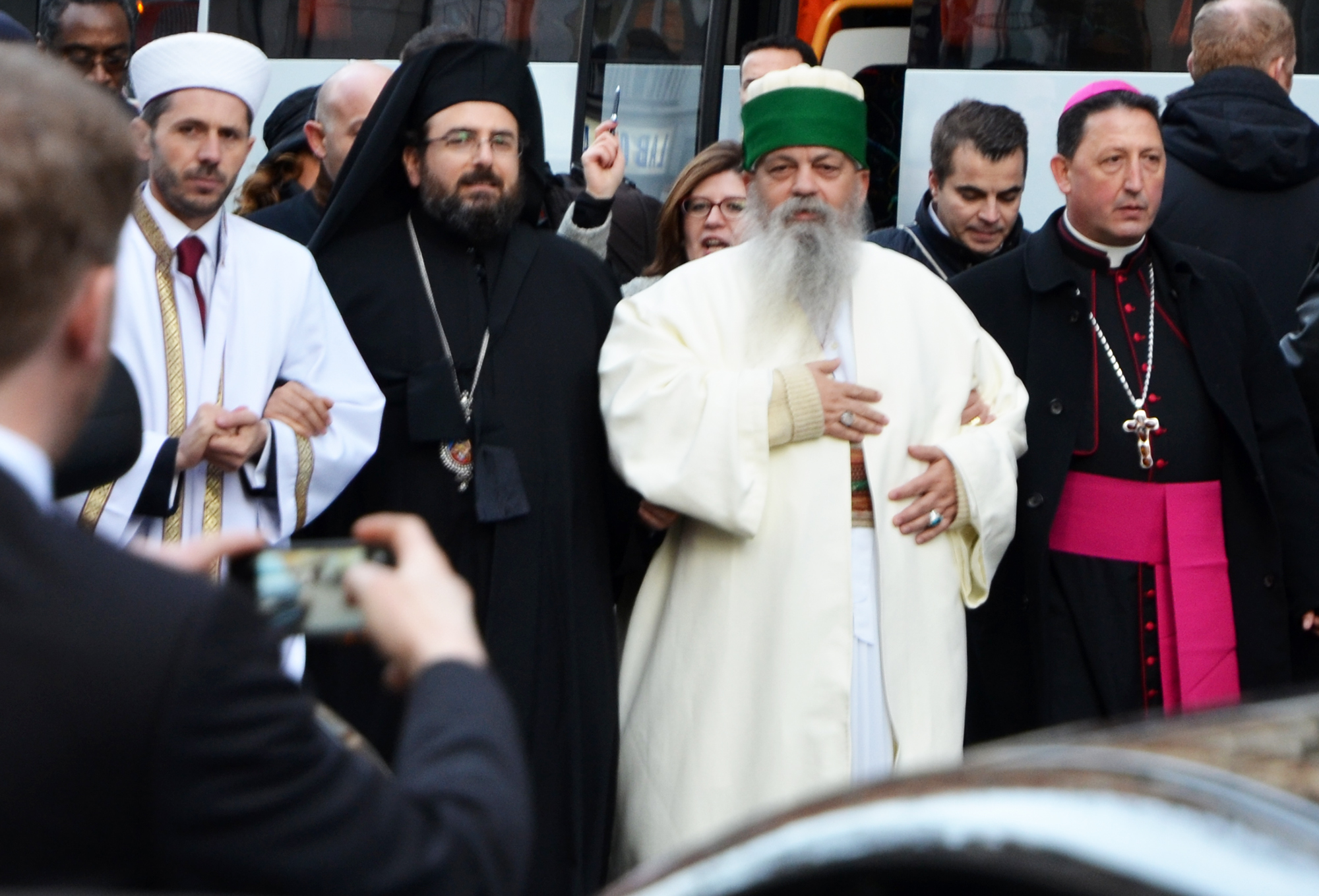
Leaders of the Sunni, Orthodox, Bektashi, and Catholic communities of Albania, in Paris, 11 January 2015

- Toulouse: 150,000 – 180,000
- Nantes: 75,000
- Marseille: 45,000
- Strasbourg: 45,000
- Lille: 35,000–40,000
- Besançon: 30,000
- Nice: 30,000
- Limoges: 30,000
- Pau: 30,000
- Orléans: 22,000
- Agen: 13,000
- Le Havre: 10,000

==== International ====
- (Belgium) Brussels: 3,000
- (Netherlands) Amsterdam: 18,000 (8 January)
- (United States) New York City: 2,000
- (United States) San Francisco: 500
- (United States) Boston: 1,000

=== January 11 ===
==== France ====
- Paris: 1,500,000–2,000,000
- Lyon: 330,000
- Bordeaux: 140,000
- Rennes: 115,000
- Grenoble: 110,000
- Montpellier: 100,000
- Clermont-Ferrand: 70,000
- Saint-Étienne: 70,000
- Marseille: 65,000
- Brest: 65,000
- Nancy: 50,000
- Strasbourg: 45,000
- Toulon: 45,000
- Angers: 45,000
- Metz: 45,000
- Aix-en-Provence: 40,000
- Perpignan: 40,000
- Tours: 35,000
- Dijon: 35,000
- Caen: 33,000
- Lorient: 30,000
- Nimes: 30,000
- Saint-Brieuc: 30,000
- Reims: 25,000
- Cherbourg: 25,000
- Mulhouse: 25,000
- Quimper: 25,000
- Angouleme: 20,000
- Chambery: 20,000
- Avignon: 20,000
- Vannes: 20,000
- Albi: 16,000
- Alençon: 15,000
- Bastia: 15,000
- Bourg en Bresse: 15,000
- Blois: 15,000
- Carcassonne: 15,000
- La Rochelle: 15,000
- Laval: 15,000
- Mâcon: 15,000
- Perigueux: 15,000
- Poitiers: 15,000
- Saint-Malo: 15,000
- Tarbes: 14,000
- Belfort: 13,000
- Cognac: 11,000
- Charleville-Mézières: 12,000
- Troyes: 12,000
- Ajaccio: 10,000
- Cannes: 10,000
- Bergerac: 10,000
- Tulle: 10,000
- Colmar: 10,000
- Ferney Voltaire: 10,000
- Libourne: 10,000
- Dammartin-en-Goële: 10,000
- Narbonne: 10,000
The Republican marches in France, 11 January 2015

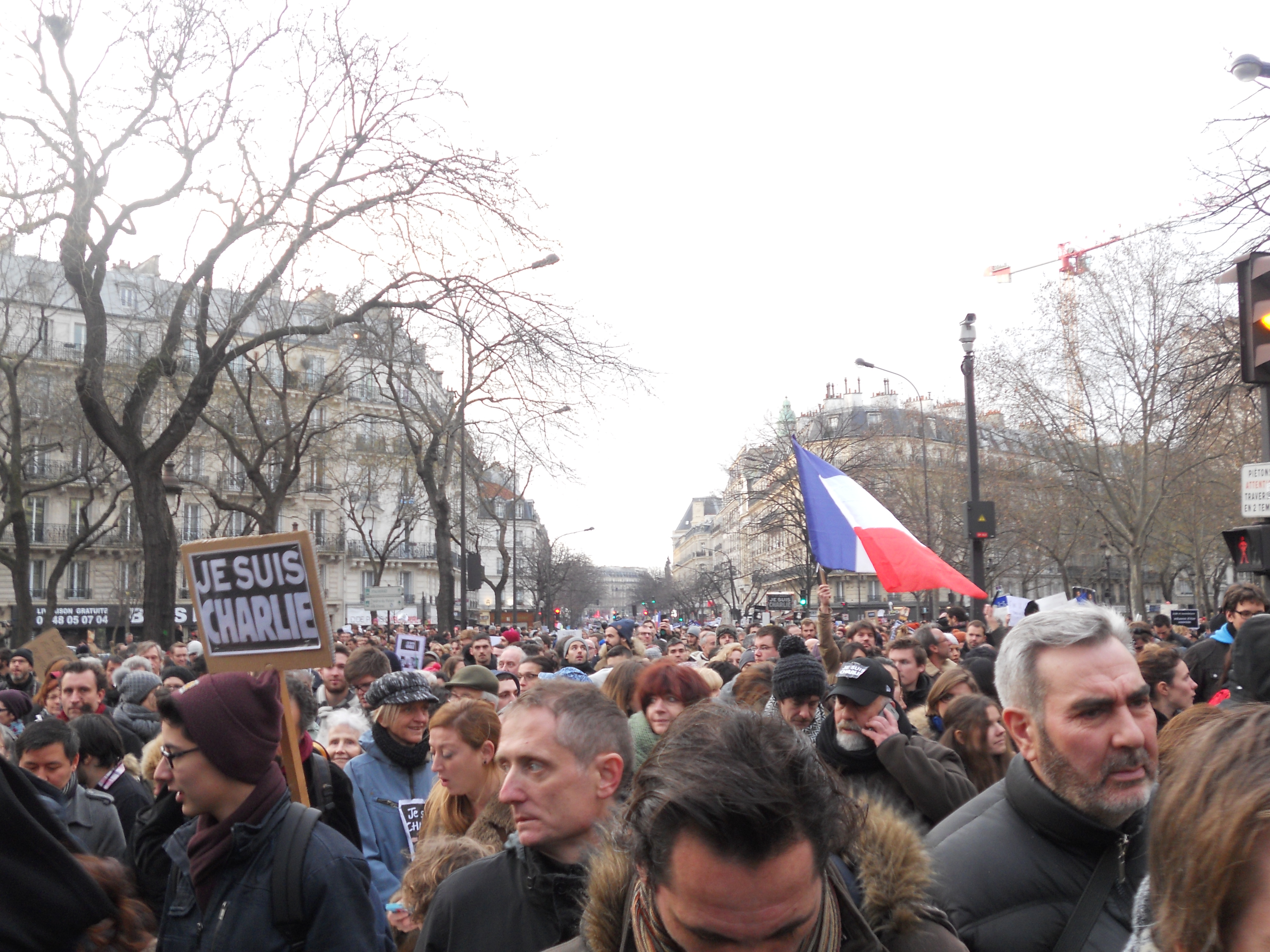
Paris

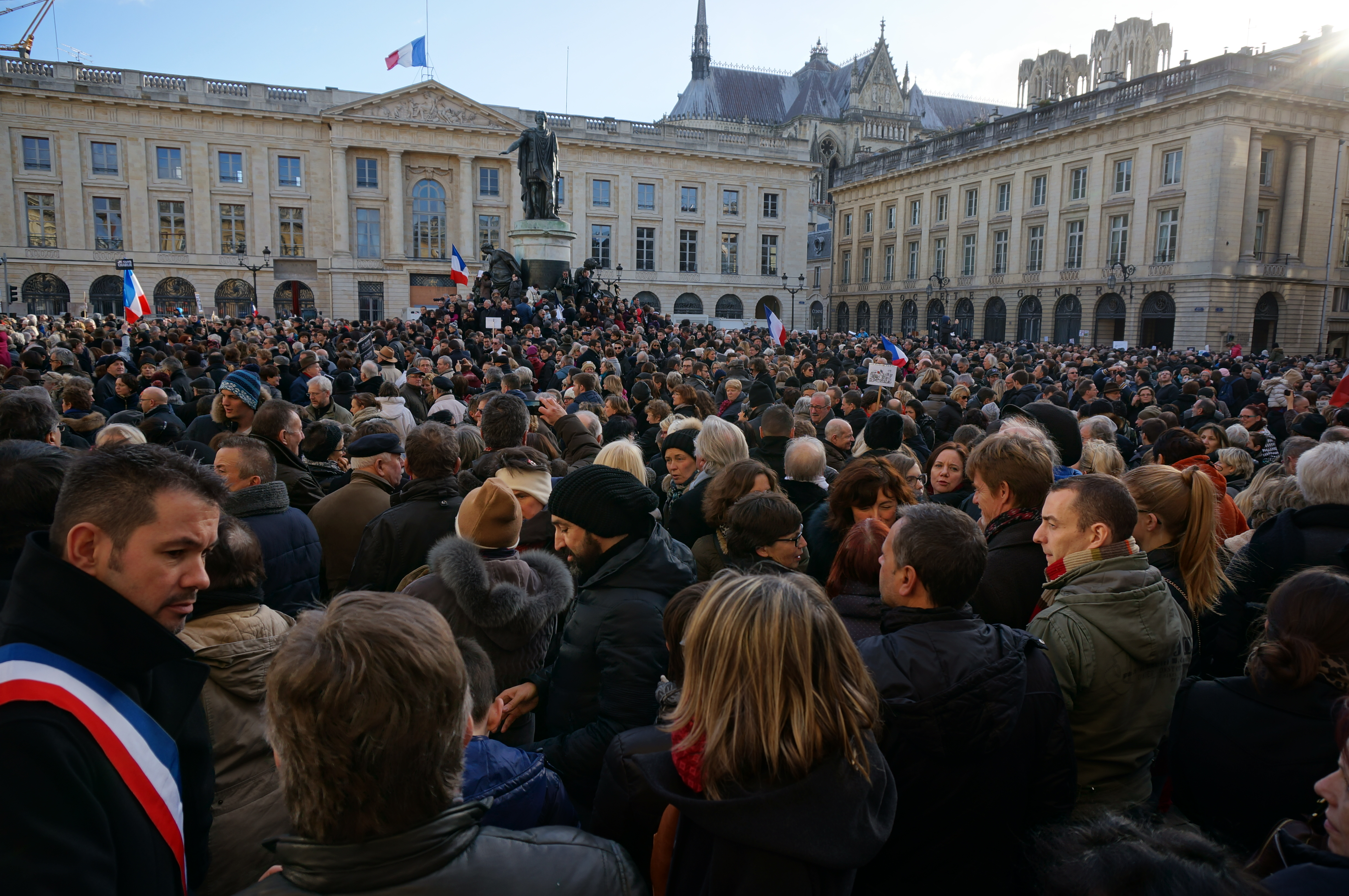
Reims

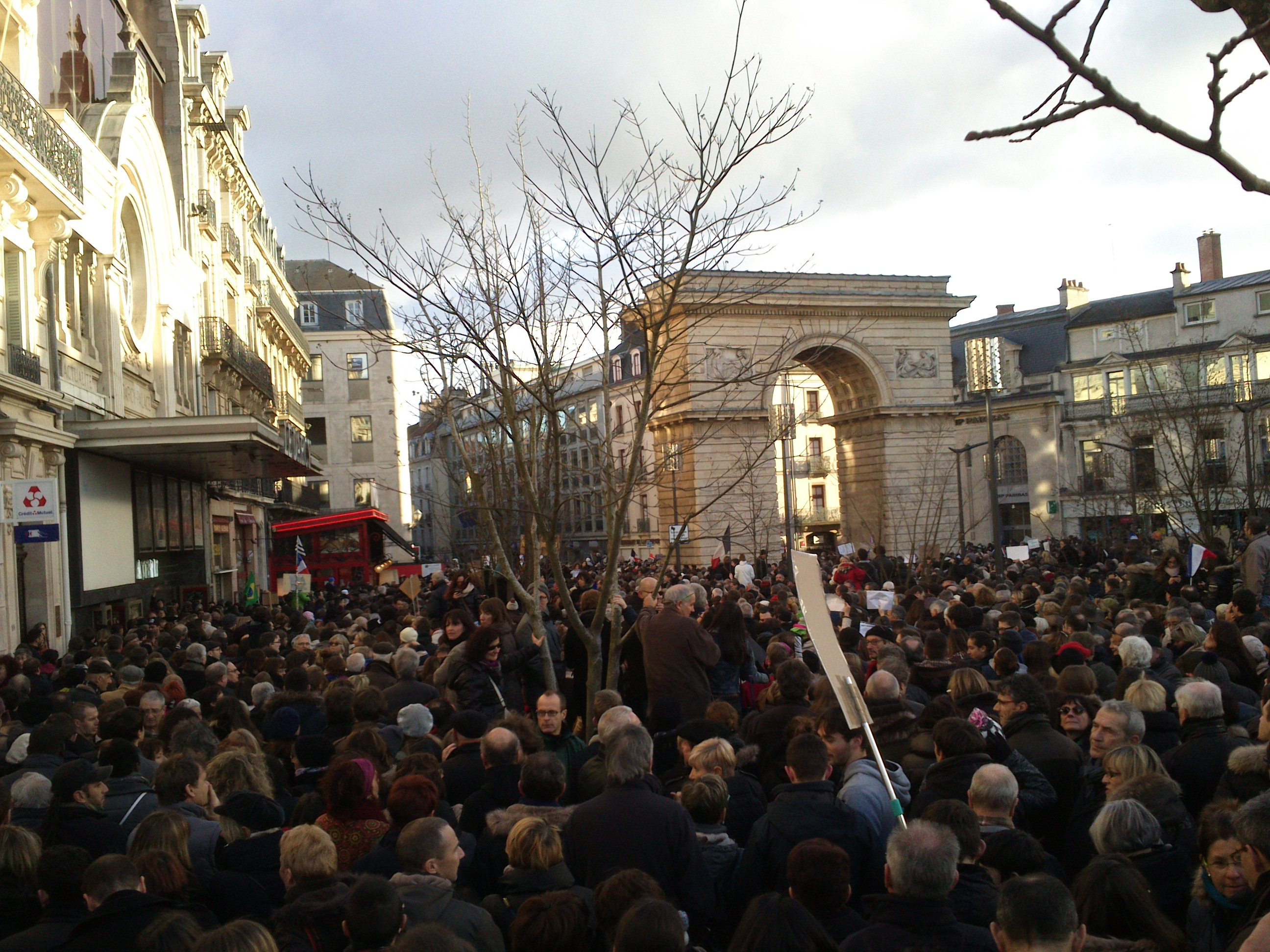
Dijon

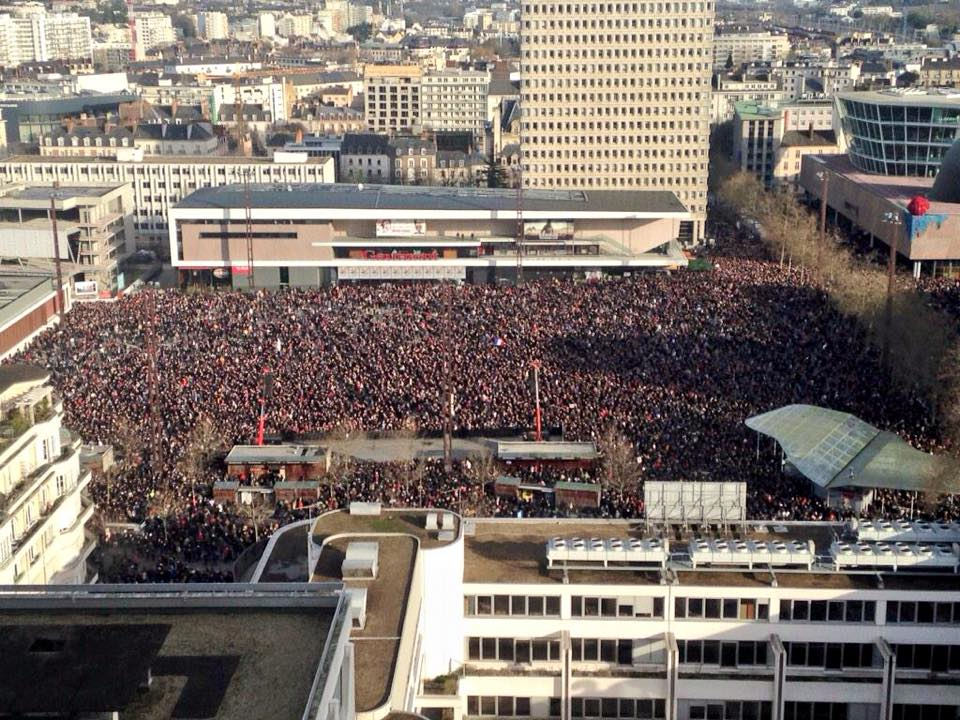
Rennes

==== International ====
- (Argentina) Buenos Aires: 1,000
- (Australia) Sydney: 500–1,000
- (Australia) Melbourne:
- (Austria) Vienna: 12,000
- (Belgium) Brussels: 20,000
- (Brazil) Brasília: 300
- (Brazil) Rio de Janeiro: 250
- (Brazil) São Paulo: 300
- (Burundi) Bujumbura: 300
- (Canada) Montreal:
- (Canada) Ottawa:
- (Canada) Quebec City:
- (Canada) Toronto:
- (Canada) Vancouver:
- (Cyprus) Larnaca
- (Czech Republic) Pardubice: 100
- (Finland) Helsinki
- (Georgia (country)) Tbilisi
- (Germany) Berlin: 18,000
- (Germany) Bonn: 1,500
- (Germany) Düsseldorf
- (Germany) Hanover: 300
- (Germany) Munich: 3,000
- (Greece) Athens: 500
- (Greece) Thessaloniki: 500
- (Greece) Rhodes
- (Indonesia) Jakarta
- (Iran) Tehran
- (Republic of Ireland) Cork
- (Republic of Ireland) Dublin: 4,000
- (Israel) Jerusalem: 1000
- (Israel) Tel Aviv
- (Italy) Bologna
- (Italy) Milan
- (Italy) Pisa
- (Italy) Rome
- (Italy) Venice
- (Japan) Tokyo
- (Lebanon) Beirut
- Luxembourg: 2,000
- (Malta) Valletta: 60
- (Mexico) Guadalajara: 200
- (Norway) Oslo: 500
- (Palestine) Gaza
- (Palestine) Ramallah
- (Poland) Warsaw
- (Portugal) Lisbon
- (Portugal) Porto
- (Romania) Cluj-Napoca: 500
- (Russia) Moscow
- (South Africa) Cape Town
- (South Korea) Seoul
- (Spain) Madrid: 500–1,000
- (Sweden) Gothenburg
- (Sweden) Stockholm: 3,000
- (Switzerland) Geneva: 500
- (Switzerland) Lausanne: 2,000
- (Taiwan) Taipei
- (Thailand) Bangkok:500
- (Thailand) Pattaya:30
- (Tunisia) Tunis
- (Turkey) Ankara
- (Turkey) Istanbul
- (Turkey) İzmir
- (United Kingdom) Birmingham
- (United Kingdom) Cambridge
- (United Kingdom) Cardiff: 1,000
- (United Kingdom) Edinburgh
- (United Kingdom) London: 2,000
- (Ukraine) Kharkiv
- (Ukraine) Kyiv
- (United States) Chicago
- (United States) New York City
- (United States) San Francisco: 2,000
- (United States) Boston: 500
- (United States) Washington, D.C.: 3,000
- (Venezuela) Caracas: 200
- (Vietnam) Ho Chi Minh City
The international Republican marches, 11 January 2015

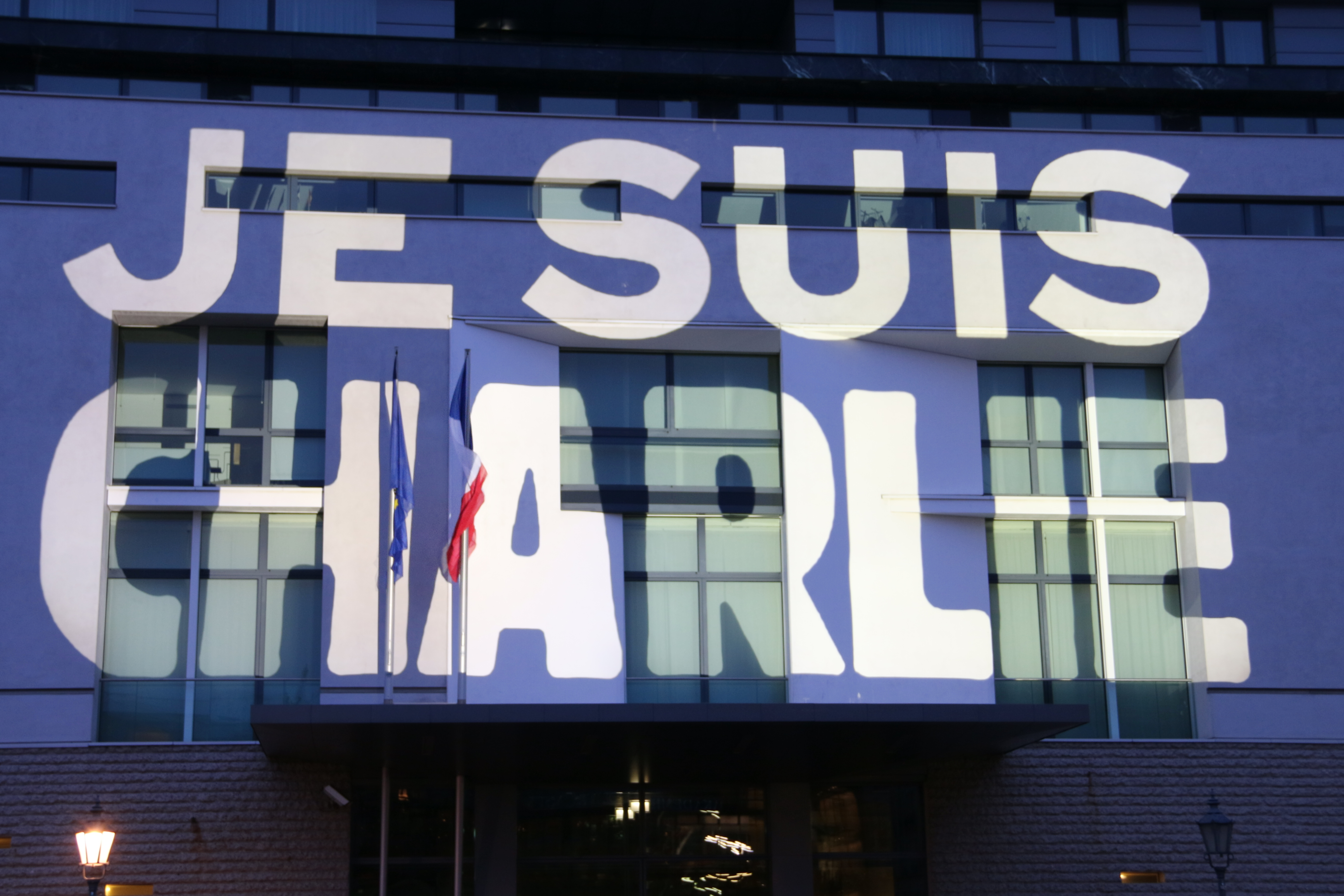
French Embassy, Berlin

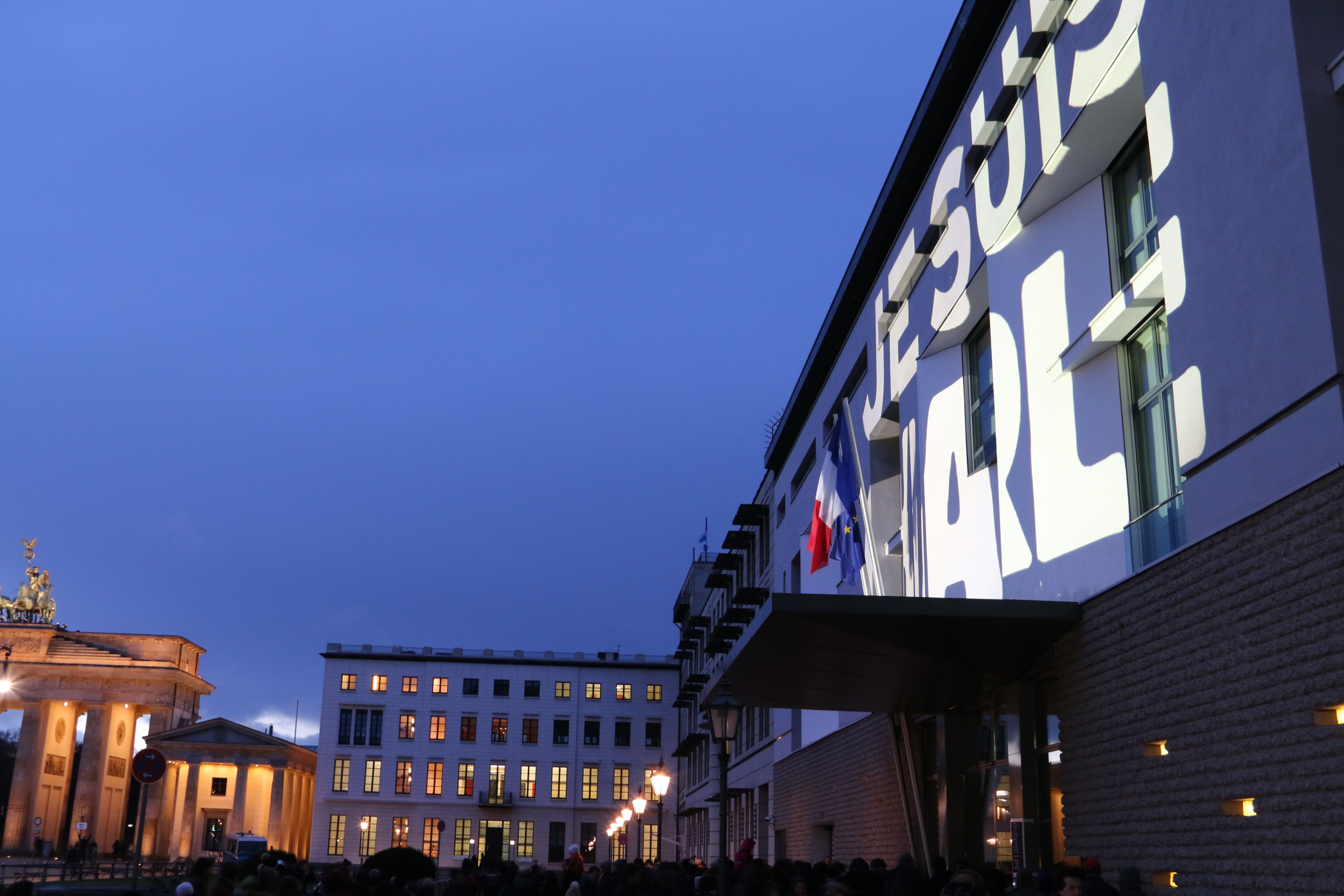
French Embassy, near Brandenburger Tor, Berlin

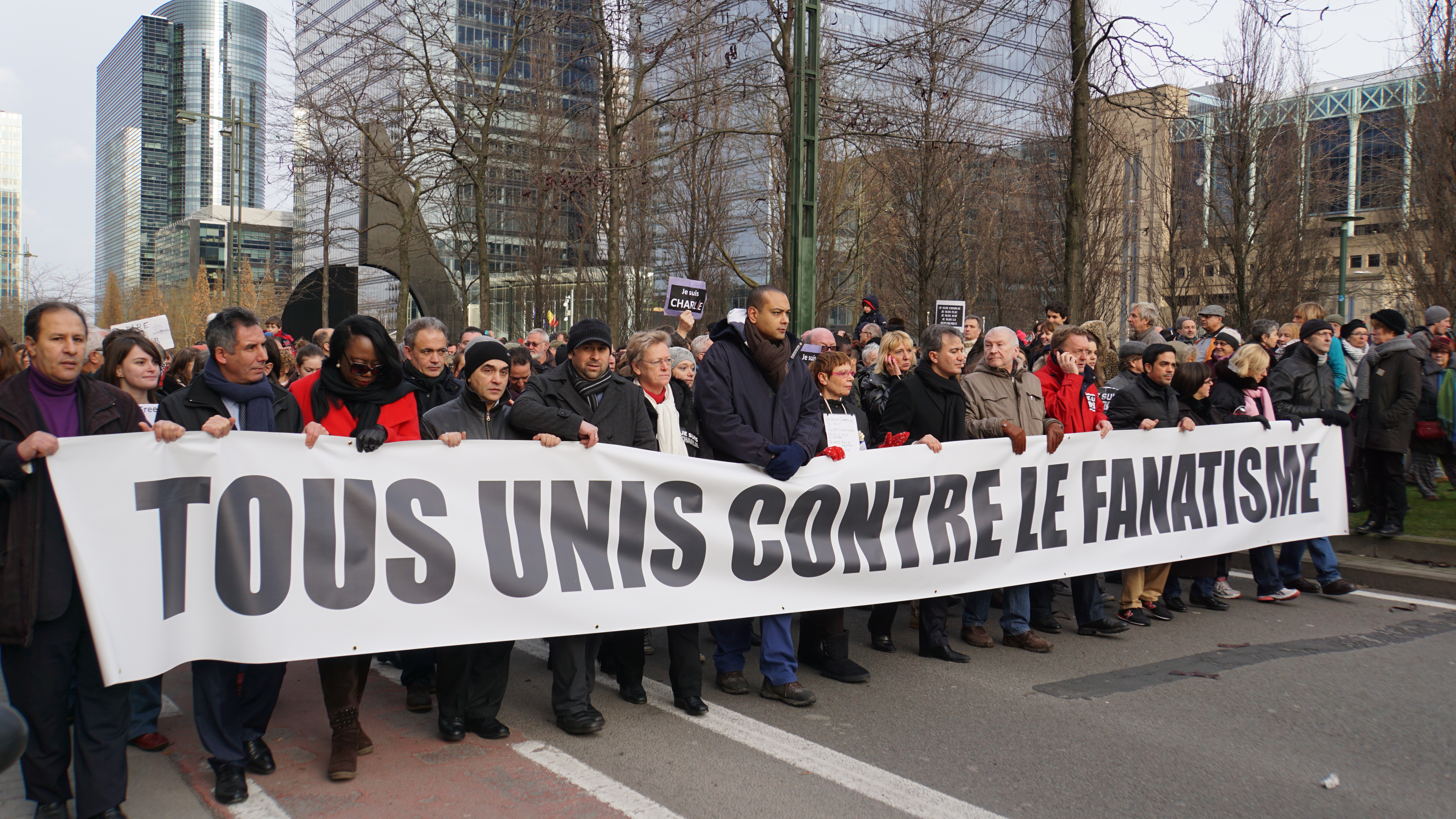
Brussels, Belgium

== Notable participants ==
=== France ===
- Pierre Arditi (actor)
- Martine Aubry (Mayor of Lille)
- Jean-Marc Ayrault (former Prime Minister)
- Édouard Balladur (former Prime Minister)
- Claude Bartolone (President of the National Assembly)
- Jean-Michel Baylet (leader of the Radical Party of the Left)
- François Bayrou (leader of the Democratic Movement)
- Tahar Ben Jelloun (Franco-Moroccan writer)
- Laurent Berger (general secretary of the French Democratic Confederation of Labour)
- Dalil Boubakeur (President of the French Council of the Muslim Faith and Rector of the Grand Mosque of Paris)
- Jean-Christophe Cambadélis (Leader of the French Socialist Party)
- Sorj Chalandon (writer)
- Hassen Chalghoumi (Imam of Drancy)
- Emmanuelle Cosse (leader of Europe Ecology – The Greens)
- Édith Cresson (former Prime Minister)
- Roger Cukierman (President of Representative Council of French Jewish Institutions)
- Jean-Louis Debré (President of the Constitutional Council of France)
- Pascal Delannoy (Bishop of Saint-Denis and representative of the French Council of Bishops)
- Bertrand Delanoë (former Mayor of Paris)
- Jean-Paul Delevoye (President of the French Economic and Social Council)
- Harlem Désir (Secretary of State for European Affairs)
- François de Rugy (Co-President of the National Assembly's Ecologist Parliamentary Group)
- Dominique de Villepin (former Prime Minister)
- Nicolas Dupont-Aignan (leader of Arise the Republic)
- François Fillon (former Prime Minister)
- Caroline Fourest (writer, political pundit, former Charlie Hebdo correspondent)
- Pierre Gattaz (CEO of Radiall, President of Medef)
- Laurent Hénart (representing the Radical Party)
- Anne Hidalgo (Mayor of Paris)
- François Hollande (President of France)
- Jean-Paul Huchon (President of the Île-de-France Regional Council)
- Alain Juppé (former Prime Minister)
- Lionel Jospin (former Prime Minister)
- Patrick Karam (President of the Representative Council of French Overseas territories)
- Nathalie Kosciusko-Morizet (representing the Union for a Popular Movement)
- Jean-Christophe Lagarde (leader of Union of Democrats and Independents)
- Stanislas Lalanne (Bishop of Pontoise)
- Jack Lang (President of the Arab World Institute and former Education and Culture minister)
- Gérard Larcher (President of the French Senate)
- Pierre Lemaitre (writer)
- Pierre Lescure (President of the Cannes Film Festival)
- Moché Lewin (Executive Director of the Conference of European Rabbis)
- Stéphane Lissner (Director of the Paris Opera)
- Jean-Claude Mailly (Secretary General of Workers' Force)
- Richard Malka (lawyer for Charlie Hebdo, comic book writer)
- Jean-Luc Mélenchon (leader of the Left Party)
- Joël Mergui (président du Consistoire central israélite de France)
- Frédéric Mitterrand (former Minister of Culture, writer, journalist)
- Hervé Morin (leader of New Centre)
- Mohammed Moussaoui (President of French Council of the Muslim Faith)
- Fleur Pellerin (Minister of Culture and Communication)
- Patrick Pelloux (emergency physician, Charlie Hebdo correspondent)
- Plantu (political cartoonist)
- Jean-Pierre Raffarin (former Prime Minister)
- Jean-Michel Ribes (Director of Théâtre du Rond-Point)
- Michel Rocard (former Prime Minister)
- Ségolène Royal (Minister of Ecology, Sustainable Development and Energy)
- Éric Ruf (Director of Comédie-Française)
- Nicolas Sarkozy (former President of France)
- Michel Sapin (Minister of Finance)
- Éric-Emmanuel Schmitt (writer)
- Christiane Taubira (Minister of Justice)
- Jacques Toubon (Ombudsman of France)
- Philippe Val (journalist, former editor of Charlie Hebdo)
- Manuel Valls (Prime Minister)

=== International ===
Europe

- Edi Rama (Prime Minister of Albania)
- (Albania) Ditmir Bushati (Minister of Foreign Affairs)
- (Albania) Edmond Brahimaj (World leader of the Bektashi Order)
- (Albania) Lucjan Avgustini (Bishop of the Roman Catholic Diocese of Sapë)
- Sebastian Kurz (Minister of Foreign Affairs of Austria)
- Charles Michel (Prime Minister of Belgium)
- (Belgium) Jan Jambon (Vice-Prime Minister and Minister Of The Interior)
- Zlatko Lagumdžija (Vice Chairman of the Council of Ministers of Bosnia and Herzegovina)
- Boyko Borisov (Prime Minister of Bulgaria)
- Zoran Milanović (Prime Minister of Croatia)
- Bohuslav Sobotka (Prime Minister of the Czech Republic)
- Helle Thorning-Schmidt (Prime Minister of Denmark)
- Mette Frederiksen (Minister of Justice of Denmark)
- Keit Pentus-Rosimannus (Minister of Foreign Affairs of Estonia)
- Alexander Stubb (Prime Minister of Finland)
- (Georgia (country)) Irakli Garibashvili (Prime Minister of Georgia)
- Angela Merkel (Chancellor of Germany)
- (Germany) Thomas de Maizière (Minister of the Interior)
- (Germany) Frank-Walter Steinmeier (Minister of Foreign Affairs)
- (Germany) Sigmar Gabriel (Vice-Chancellor and Minister of the Economy)
- Antonis Samaras (Prime Minister of Greece)
- Viktor Orbán (Prime Minister of Hungary)
- Ferenc Gyurcsány (former Prime Minister of Hungary)
- (Republic of Ireland) Enda Kenny (Prime Minister of Ireland)
- Matteo Renzi (Prime Minister of Italy)
- (Italy) Angelino Alfano (Minister of the Interior)
- (Italy) Paolo Gentiloni (Minister of Foreign Affairs)
- Romano Prodi (former Prime Minister of Italy)
- Mario Monti (former Prime Minister of Italy)
- Atifete Jahjaga (President of Kosovo)
- Laimdota Straujuma (Prime Minister of Latvia)
- Xavier Bettel (Prime Minister of Luxembourg)
- Joseph Muscat (Prime Minister of Malta)
- Michel Roger (Minister of State of Monaco)
- Mark Rutte (Prime Minister of the Netherlands)
- Erna Solberg (Prime Minister of Norway)
- Børge Brende (Minister of Foreign Affairs of Norway)
- Ewa Kopacz (Prime Minister of Poland)
- Pedro Passos Coelho (Prime Minister of Portugal)
- Klaus Iohannis (President of Romania)
- (Russia) Sergey Lavrov (Minister of Foreign Affairs of the Russian Federation)
- Ivica Dačić (First Deputy Prime Minister of Serbia)
- Maja Gojković (President of the National Assembly of Serbia)
- Robert Fico (Prime Minister of Slovakia)
- Miro Cerar (Prime Minister of Slovenia)
- (Slovenia) Karl Erjavec (Minister of Foreign Affairs)
- Mariano Rajoy (Prime Minister of Spain)
- Stefan Löfven (Prime Minister of Sweden)
- (Switzerland) Simonetta Sommaruga (President of the Swiss Confederation)
- Petro Poroshenko (President of Ukraine)
- David Cameron (Prime Minister of the United Kingdom)
- Ed Miliband (Leader of the Opposition in the United Kingdom)

North America

- Steven Blaney (Minister of Public Security of Canada)
- Jane D. Hartley (United States Ambassador to France)
- (United States) Victoria Nuland (Assistant Secretary of State for European and Eurasian Affairs)

South America

- (Brazil) José Bustani (Brazilian Ambassador to France)

Asia

- Eduard Nalbandyan (Minister of Foreign Affairs of Armenia)
- Benjamin Netanyahu (Prime Minister of Israel)
- Abdullah II of Jordan (King of Jordan) and his wife, Queen Rania
- Gebran Bassil (Minister of Foreign Affairs of Lebanon)
- (United Arab Emirates) Abdullah bin Zayed Al Nahyan (Minister of Foreign Affairs of the UAE)
- Mahmoud Abbas (President of the State of Palestine)
- (China) Zhai Jun (Chinese Ambassador to France)
- (India) Arun Singh (Indian Ambassador to France)
- Ahmet Davutoglu (Prime Minister of Turkey)

Africa

- Ramtane Lamamra (Minister of Foreign Affairs of Algeria)
- Thomas Boni Yayi (President of Benin)
- Ali Bongo (President of Gabon)
- Ibrahim Boubacar Keïta (President of Mali)
- Mahamadou Issoufou (President of Niger)
- Mehdi Jomaa (Prime Minister of Tunisia)
- Faure Gnassingbé (President of Togo)
- Robert Dussey (Minister of Foreign Affairs of Togo)
- Macky Sall (President of Senegal)
- Sameh Shoukry (Minister of Foreign Affairs of Egypt)

Institutions

- Jens Stoltenberg (Secretary General of NATO)
- (United Nations) Staffan de Mistura (Special Representative of the Secretary-General)
- Irina Bokova (Director-General of UNESCO)
- Thorbjørn Jagland (Secretary General of the Council of Europe)
- (European Union) Donald Tusk (President of the European Council)
- (European Union) Jean-Claude Juncker (President of the European Commission)
- (European Union) Martin Schulz (President of the European Parliament)
- (European Union) Federica Mogherini (High Representative of the Union for Foreign Affairs and Security Policy/Vice President for the European Council)
- (Organisation internationale de la Francophonie) Michaëlle Jean (Secretary General of la Francophonie)
- Nabil Elaraby (Secretary General of the Arab League)
- Guy Ryder (Head of the International Labour Organization)

=== Did not attend ===
- Prime Minister of Iceland Sigmundur Davíð Gunnlaugsson did not attend the march; his office released a statement citing the short notice, travel time and the Prime Minister's schedule, and emphasized that no invitation had been rejected, as none had been sent to him specifically. Sigmundur Davíð was the only Western European head of government not to attend the march; instead Iceland was represented by the deputy head of mission at the Icelandic Embassy in Paris, Nína Björk Jónsdóttir. Sigmundur Davíð's absence was criticized in Iceland, and his office acknowledged that a high-ranking official should have attended the march.
- President of the United States Barack Obama did not attend the Paris march, citing the short notice and the logistics of providing the necessary security. The Secret Service said it was not consulted and an agency official acknowledged that the Secret Service had pulled off previous last minute trips. White House spokesman Josh Earnest said that they "should have sent someone with a higher profile" than United States Ambassador to France Jane Hartley. United States Attorney General Eric Holder and United States Deputy Secretary of Homeland Security Alejandro Mayorkas were in Paris for a security summit convened after the shootings, but did not attend the Paris rally. The lack of senior American officials was criticized.

== National Front controversy ==
During the organisation march, a controversy arose when Marine Le Pen was told she was not invited in the marches. This is due to the National Front reputation of divisiveness. François Lamy, one of the organisers, said it is not where the National Front should be; it is not where a political party which, for years, has divided French citizens because of their origin or their religion should be. The President closed this political issue declaring that "every citizen can come...it is not controlled."
