= Text (company) =

AI customer service software company

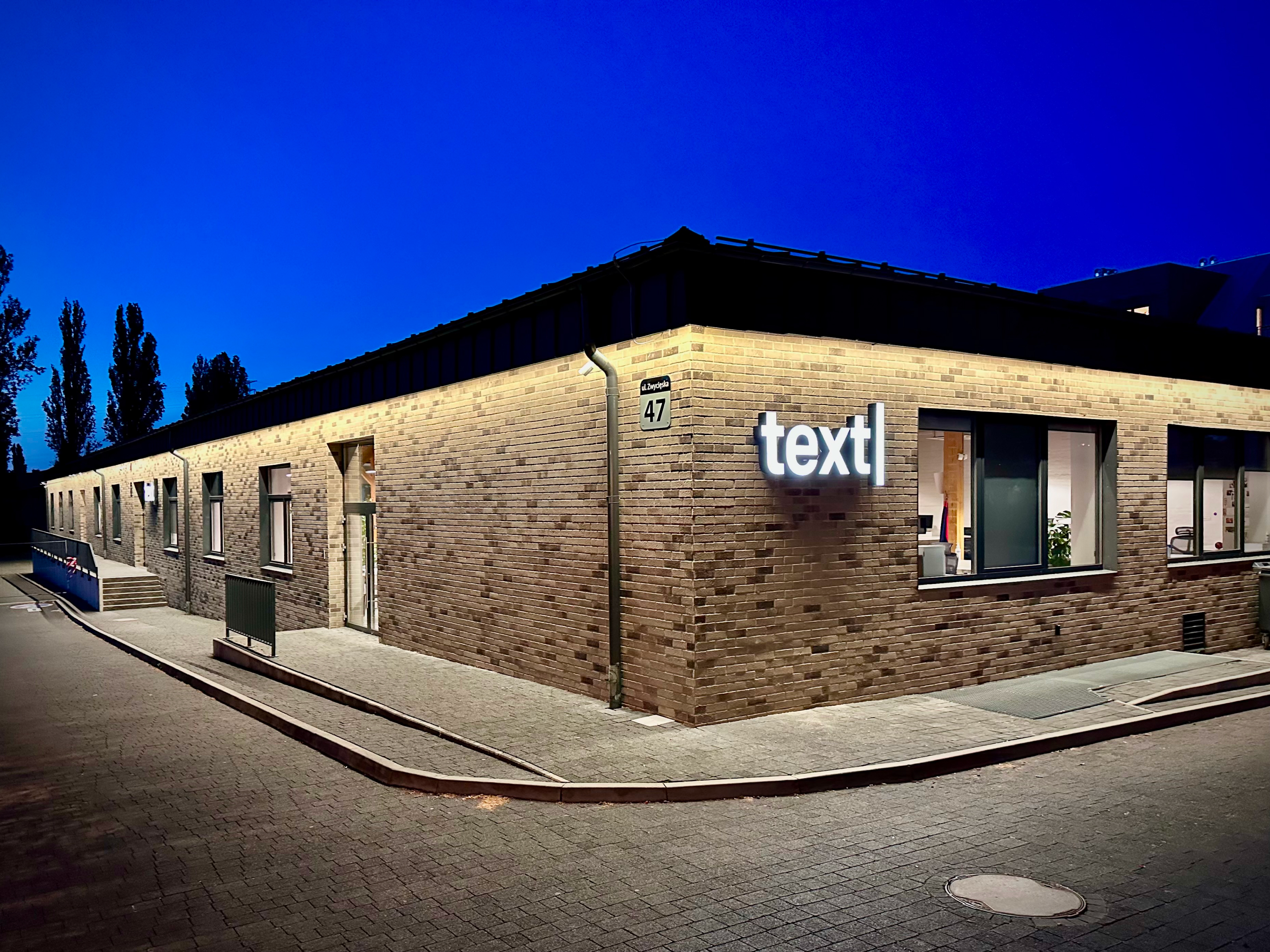
- Type: Public
- Traded as: WSE: TXT; WIG30 Component
- ISIN: PLLVTSF00010
- Industry: Artificial intelligence, Software
- Founded: Wrocław, Poland 2002; 24 years ago
- Headquarters: Wrocław, Poland
- Number of locations: 2 offices (2024)
- Area served: Worldwide
- Key people: Mariusz Cieply (CEO); Urszula Jarzebowska (CFO); Szymon Klimczak (CMO); Bartosz Olchowka (CTO); Piotr Bednarek (CCO); Maciej Malesa (CIO)
- Products: ChatBot, HelpDesk, Knowledge Base, LiveChat, OpenWidget, Text
- Services: Chatbot platform; Help desk software; Knowledge-base system; Live support software; Website widgets
- Revenue: ▲223 million zł (2022); 179 million zł (2021)
- Net income: ▲119 million zł (2022); 100 million zł (2021)
- Number of employees: 268
- Subsidiaries: Text, Inc.
- Website: text.com

Text (WSE: TXT), formerly known as LiveChat Software, is a Polish software company that develops customer service and communication software incorporating artificial intelligence (AI). Based in Wrocław, the company develops software for business-to-business (B2B) and business-to-consumer (B2C) communication. Its products include Text, LiveChat, ChatBot, and HelpDesk. The company is listed on the Warsaw Stock Exchange.

The company was founded in Wroclaw, Poland in 2002, and also has US offices in Boston, Massachusetts. In 2023, the company rebranded from "LiveChat Software" to "Text" to reflect its broadened focus on artificial intelligence and e-commerce solutions.

It serves more than 28,000 paid customers in over 150 countries, including Adobe, AirAsia, Best Buy, Better Business Bureau, ING, Huawei, Orange, and PayPal.

== History and Milestones ==
Founded in 2002 as LiveChat Sp. z o.o. (LLC) in Wrocław, Poland, the company initially focused on live chat solutions for businesses. In October 2007, it transitioned into a stock company.

In October 2006, 50% of the company stock was bought by Capital Partners S.A., an investment and consulting firm publicly listed at the Warsaw Stock Exchange. In February 2008 Capital Partners S.A. decided to follow its strategy of having fewer companies but larger individual transactions and sold its entire stake along with another 13% of company stock to another publicly listed company, Gadu-Gadu S.A. This way LiveChat Software became another Polish company in Naspers capital group, joining Gadu-Gadu and Allegro.pl.

In January 2011, the management team sought to get back a controlling equity stake in the company and started a management buyout. After Naspers agreed in June 2011 to sell its entire stake, the founders joined with private equity firm Tar Heel Capital to finalize the buyout of the 60% stake. After the transaction was completed in September 2011, the founders own 60% of the stake, while Tar Heel Capital owns 40% of the company.

LiveChat Software was introduced to the Warsaw Stock Exchange in April 2014 with the symbol LVC.

In 2023, the company changed its name from "LiveChat Software" to "Text" to reflect its expanded product offering and focus on artificial intelligence and e-commerce. It has offices in Wrocław and Boston, Massachusetts, with a global customer base.

== Products ==
=== Text ===
Text is an integrated suite of customer service and sales products, including selling AI agents. It integrates with Shopify, Webflow and WhatsApp, among other services. In 2026, Text won the MarTech Breakthrough Award, being named the Retail Technology Solution of the Year.

=== LiveChat ===
LiveChat is live support software and help desk software used by companies to communicate with customers using multiple channels: online chat on the website and inside mobile applications, email, and social media, such as Facebook Messenger.

=== ChatBot ===
ChatBot
- ChatBot logo
- Original author: Dariusz Zabrzenski
- Developer: Text
- Release: August 29, 2017; 9 years ago
- Operating system: Web-based
- Available in: English
- Type: Chatbot
- License: Proprietary (SaaS)
- Website: chatbot.com

ChatBot is a software platform for creating chatbots for business use, released in August 2017. It constructs bots that can integrate with services including Facebook Messenger, LiveChat, Skype, KiK, Slack, Twitter and YouTube.

In 2020, the number of ChatBot clients reached 1,000, including UEFA, Unilever, HTC, Kayak, Danone, Moody's, and GM. ChatBot supports multiple non-profit organizations, including: European Mentoring and Coaching Council, Musculoskeletal Australia, Operation Kindness and Tinnitus UK. It is mainly used for connecting and engaging with communities, and fundraising.

==== History ====
ChatBot (BotEngine) has its origins in a research project created by the company Text (formerly LiveChat Software), which won with this project at hackathon in 2016. In August 2017, LiveChat launched a beta version of the BotEngine chatbots build platform.

In September 2017, LiveChat integrated with BotEngine. ChatBot, in its current form, was launched on February 21, 2018. In March 2018, BotEngine was released from its beta version. Later that year, the product was rebranded to ChatBot, following the purchase of the chatbot.com domain. In October 2019, ChatBot added a feature to collect customized data about visitors who interacted with bots on websites or Facebook. In May 2020, ChatBot in partnership with Infermedica, launched COVID-19 Risk Assessment ChatBot.

In March 2021, ChatBot launched a new version of Visual Builder.

=== HelpDesk ===
HelpDesk is a system for tracking, prioritizing, and resolving customer support tickets. Customers can send messages to companies through email. Team members can create tickets if customer queries came from other communication channels, such as LiveChat, Facebook Messenger, WhatsApp, or a phone call.

All inquiries are collected as tickets and assigned statuses and categories within the application. The application stores customer profiles and the history of their previous messages.

=== Knowledge Base ===
Knowledge Base is a tool that builds a self-service help center. It can be used both as an internal database for agents and an external public help center for customers. The internal widget is equipped with AI support that suggests articles to answer customer queries.

=== OpenWidget ===
OpenWidget is a free website widget and plugin software product. It was launched in November 2022. It allows users to add functionality to an existing website using pre-defined apps, such as contact and feedback forms, product reviews and recommendations, and frequently asked questions templates. These widgets integrate with ecommerce platforms, such as Shopify, BigCommerce, WooCommerce, and website builders, such as WordPress. The authors claim "using AI for ecommerce personalization" to be their mission.

=== Past products ===
Products offered in the past, but currently discontinued are GG Pro (which was a corporate instant messenger) and Chat Server, which was a chat software for moderated chat rooms. Besides developing and selling communication solutions, from 2004–2010, LiveChat Software was the owner of one of the first Polish online chat portals, POLChat.

Another product offered by the company was chat.io. It was a chat widget for websites, apps, and social messaging with message sneak peeks, agent ratings, and chat routing. It allowed integrations with multiple communication channels, like Facebook Messenger. The chat.io platform provided APIs to allow developers to build features atop the current offering. The product was discontinued and became a part of LiveChat.

== Awards ==
In October 2007 LiveChat (formerly LIVECHAT Contact Center) was listed among the top Customer Support and Feedback applications in the Inside CRM report recommended by Guy Kawasaki.

In 2011 Deloitte listed LiveChat Software as one of the fastest-growing Central European technology companies in the Deloitte Technology Fast 50 program, based on revenue growth over the previous five years. In 2012 the company was listed 18th in the same ranking, based on its revenue growth.

In 2013 the company was listed by Red Herring in the group of the most innovative companies from across Europe. It has been recognized by Deloitte in its annual Technology Fast 50 program and listed 18th.

In 2015, during the Private Equity Forum & Awards Gala organized by the Executive Club with the support of the Polish Private Equity & Venture Capital Association, LiveChat Software was awarded "Private Equity Diamonds in the category Portfolio company (small cap). Later that year, LiveChat Software was shortlisted for the European Small and Mid-Cap Awards organized by EuropeanIssuers, FESE, and the European Commission. One of three companies entered for the awards by Warsaw Stock Exchange, LiveChat was among the only CEE companies to be shortlisted.

== Corporate social responsibility ==
The company has supported organizations during the 2020 COVID-19 outbreak, by offering its services for free to non-profits and for-profits helping towards the COVID-19 cause.

It has supported the customer service community and individuals working in that space with tools that help with their development. One of the examples is Typing Speed Test, a free tool that works as an online speed typing contest. It is used to improve the efficiency and accuracy of typing skills (measured in words per minute). Another example is Customer Service Training, a free customer experience training for agents and customer service professionals.

In 2022 the company supported nonprofit organisation, Tech to the Rescue, by conducting several low bono and pro bono projects. One of them was a product integration between sign language platform Migam.org, and the LiveChat application.

== See also ==
- Customer service
- List of artificial intelligence companies
