= Virgin Broadband =

Virgin Broadband may refer to services of:

- Virgin Mobile Australia
- Virgin Media (UK)
