= Gattaz =

Gattaz is a surname of Arpitan origin. Like many Arpitan anthroponyms, the final -z only marks paroxytonic stress and should not be pronounced. Nevertheless, it is often pronounced in French through hypercorrection. Notable people with the surname include:

- Carol Gattaz (born 1981), Brazilian volleyball player
- Pierre Gattaz (born 1959), French businessman, son of Yvon
- Yvon Gattaz (1925–2024), French businessman
