= Virgin Mobile France =

French cellular telephone operator

- Company type: Subsidiary
- Industry: Mobile Phones
- Founded: 3 April 2006
- Defunct: 18 May 2016
- Successor: RED
- Headquarters: France
- Key people: Pascal Rialland (CEO); Geoffroy Roux de Bezieux (Chairman); Richard Branson (Founder)
- Products: Prepaid Mobile Phones
- Number of employees: 90
- Parent: SFR
- Website: www.virginmobile.fr

Virgin Mobile France was a cellular telephone operator in France. It launched in 2006 as a joint venture between Virgin Group and Carphone Warehouse. The company operated as a mobile virtual network operator (MVNO), whereby it did not own or operate its own mobile network but instead used the network of Orange S.A. As of June 2014, the company was the largest MVNO in France, with 1.5 million customers, and had a market share of 1.3% at the beginning of 2014.

Carphone Warehouse and Virgin Group reached an agreement to sell their holdings to the French cable TV operator Numericable in June 2014 for €325 million, subject to regulatory approval. The sale was completed on 5 December 2014.

In November 2015, Numericable-SFR (now SFR) announced it would discontinue use of the Virgin Mobile brand, moving customers on fixed-term plans to its SFR brand, and those without contracts to its RED brand.

== See also ==
- Virgin Mobile
- List of mobile network operators of Europe § France
