= Chatbot (disambiguation) =

A chatbot is a program that simulates conversation.

Chatbot may also refer to:

- ChatBot, the bot-creation software product by Text
- IRC bot, bots on Internet Relay Chat
- Virtual assistant
