= Bureau Veritas =

French company

Bureau Veritas S.A.
- Type: Public
- Traded as: Euronext: BVI; CAC 40 component
- ISIN: FR0006174348
- Industry: Testing, inspection, certification
- Founded: 1828; 198 years ago
- Headquarters: Neuilly-sur-Seine, Paris, France
- Area served: Worldwide (140 countries)
- Key people: Hinda Gharbi (CEO)
- Services: Testing, inspection, certification
- Revenue: ▲€6.47 billion (2025)
- Operating income: ▲€992 million (2025)
- Net income: ▲€588 million (2025)
- Total assets: ▼€7.06 billion (2025)
- Total equity: ▼€1.75 billion (2025)
- Number of employees: 82,000 (2025)
- Parent: Wendel (35.5%)
- Website: bureauveritas.com

Bureau Veritas S.A. is a French company specialized in testing, inspection and certification founded in 1828. It operates in a variety of sectors, including building and infrastructure (27% of revenue), agri-food and commodities (23% of revenue), marine and offshore (7% of revenue), industry (22% of revenue), certification (7% of revenue), consumer products (14% of revenue), and education.

Bureau Veritas is present in 140 countries through a network of over 1,500 offices and laboratories, and 79,000 employees. Bureau Veritas generated $6.34 billion in revenue in 2024. Hinda Gharbi has been CEO of Bureau Veritas since June 2023. As of close of trade 20 December 2024, Bureau Veritas is a member of the CAC 40.

== History ==
=== 1828: Origins ===
Bureau Veritas was founded in Antwerp, Belgium, in 1828. Originally called the Bureau de renseignements pour les assurances maritimes (Information Office for Maritime Insurance), its mission was to "establish the truth and expose without apprehension or favoritism". Bureau Veritas provided insurers with information that enabled them to assess the reliability of ships and equipment, and to ensure the protection of people and property. A year after its founding, the company adopted the name "Bureau Veritas" on 28 May 1829. In July 1833, the headquarters moved to Paris.

=== 1990: Diversification and worldwide expansion ===
To meet the needs of its clients, Bureau Veritas developed its Certification and Government services businesses to evaluate management systems and supply chains. It also reinforced its network and opened offices in Africa, China and the United States.

=== 2007: Initial public offering (IPO) ===
Bureau Veritas was listed on Euronext Paris on October 24, 2007. This initial public offering was aimed at consolidating Bureau Veritas' growth strategy by raising its profile, giving it access to new means of financing and forging loyalty among its employees.

=== 2010: Development of the commodities business and in high-potential markets ===
After its acquisition of Inspectorate in 2010, Bureau Veritas became one of the world's top three players in the commodities sector and continued to expand its geographic footprint. It became the leader of its sector in Canada following the acquisition of Maxxam in 2014 and carried out in parallel a series of acquisitions in the construction and consumer products industries in China.

=== 2020: Announcement of the 2025 strategy ===
The 2025 strategy will be a value-enhancing journey ensuring both short and long term growth for Bureau Veritas, capturing the maximum value from the Group's existing businesses adjacent to its core activity and leading sustainability in the TIC sector. As of June 30, 2020, Bureau Veritas had cash and cash equivalents of €2.1 billion. In 2020, Bureau Veritas announced a net profit of €125.3 million despite a nearly 10% drop in revenue to €4.6 billion. Diversification of its activities has enabled the company to remain in the black despite the crisis. In the first half of 2021, Bureau Veritas posted a net profit of €196.9 million with revenues of €2.4 billion, up 9.9 compared to 2020. The management is satisfied after having lost 34 million euros during the health crisis of 2020. These figures therefore allow the group to raise its growth forecasts for the whole of 202117. In the same year, Bureau Veritas recruited 8,000 people, including 1,000 in France.

=== 2024: LEAP | 28 strategy ===
In March 2024 Bureau Veritas announced LEAP | 28 its latest strategy. Based on three pillars, Portfolio, Performance and Human Capital.

== Corporate Updates ==
=== 2015 to 2019 Strategy ===
In 2015, Bureau Veritas launched a strategic plan to make the Group more resilient, and more resistant to macroeconomic fluctuations (e.g. oil, gas, primary commodities, marine). This strategy aims to expand the business into high-growth sectors, such as agri-food, construction and infrastructure, connected objects and automotive. The diversification of Bureau Veritas' activities has been accompanied by a geographical restructuring. The Group has expanded on its historical presence in France and Europe, reorganizing itself into three main zones: the Americas, Europe/Africa and Asia.

In December 2021, Didier Michaud-Daniel announced Bureau Veritas' ambitions for 2025, "wishing to make it a world leader on critical societal subjects such as energy transition, smart cities, new forms of mobility and traceability of supply chains".

=== Digital strategy ===
In 2016, Bureau Veritas entered into a strategic partnership agreement with Dassault Systèmes, which allows Bureau Veritas to use their 3DEXPERIENCE digital platform to carry out continuous assessment of ships, offshore platforms and on-board equipment throughout the entire life cycle.

In 2017, Bureau Veritas entered into a partnership with Avitas Systems a GE Venture, to launch a range of inspection services based on predictive data analytics (i.e. artificial intelligence) for all industrial sectors.

In 2018, the Group launched Origin, the very first traceability label based on blockchain technology, which provides consumers with complete, end-to-end proof of a product's journey, from farm to fork.

Bureau Veritas entered into a strategic partnership with Microsoft in 2019 to develop artificial intelligence in testing laboratories.

=== Acquisitions ===
In January 2015, the Group expanded in China. Bureau Veritas acquired Shandong Chengxin, a Chinese company specialized in support services for the construction of industrial infrastructure for the energy sector. In 2017, China became the Group's largest market in terms of both revenue and employees. In April 2019, Bureau Veritas acquired Shenzhen Total-Test, a Chinese food testing company. Bureau Veritas aims to reach €1 billion in revenue in China by 2021.

In 2017, Bureau Veritas announced the acquisition of Primary Integration Solutions in the United States, thus expanding its Building & Infrastructure business into data centers. In March 2018, the Group expanded into the construction sector in the United States with the acquisition of EMG. This expansion continued even further with the acquisition of Owen in 2019, a provider of compliance services for buildings and infrastructure.

In Europe, Bureau Veritas acquired Q Certificazioni, an Italian organic food certification body, in 2019. The very same year, with the integration of Capital Energy in France, Bureau Veritas expanded its consulting and assistance services in the field of energy efficiency certification.

In January 2021, Bureau Veritas takes a majority stake in cybersecurity specialist Secura. In April 2021, the company acquires Bradley Construction Management, an American society specialized in project management and construction management services for the renewable energy sector. In September 2021, Bureau Veritas acquires AET France, a company specializing in laboratory testing, product development and sustainability testing.

In January 2022, Bureau Veritas acquires PreScience specialized in Project Management and Construction management services for Transportation Infrastructure projects. In June 2022, Advanced Testing Laboratory, specialized in scientific sourcing services, is acquired by Bureau Veritas. In July 2022, Bureau Veritas acquires AMSfashion, an expert in sustainability, quality and conformity services for the fashion industry.

== Governance ==
=== Shareholders ===
List of primary shareholders as of 30 April 2022

	% of shares held
Free Float	63,94%
Groupe Wendel	35,47%
FCP BV Next	0.22%
Group-owned stock	0.19%
Managers	0.18%

=== Executive committee ===
- Hinda Gharbi, Chief Executive Officer;
- Alberto Bedoya, Executive Vice-President, Commodities, Industry & Facilities Latin America;
- Vincent Bourdil, Executive Vice-President of Global Business Lines and Performance;
- Juliano Cardoso, Executive Vice- President, Corporate Development & Sustainability;
- François Chabas, Executive Vice-President, Finance;
- Catherine Chen, Executive Vice-President, Consumer Products Services;
- Kathryn Dolan, Executive Vice-President Human Resources;
- Philipp Karmires, Executive Vice-President and Group Chief Digital Officer;
- Laurent Louail, Executive Vice-President, Commodities, Industry and Facilities South & West Europe;
- Béatrice Place Faget, Executive Vice-President, Legal Affairs and Internal Audit;
- Marc Roussel, Executive Vice-President, Commodities, Industry and Facilities France and Africa, Government Services;
- Surachet Tanwongsval, Executive Vice-President, Commodities, Industry and Facilities Asia, Pacific;
- Shawn Till, Executive Vice-President, Commodities, Industry and Facilities North America;
- Matthieu de Tugny, Executive Vice-President, Marine & Offshore division;

=== Board of directors ===
Bureau Veritas' board of directors is made up of twelve members. In December 2022, Laurent Mignon was appointed on the board of directors succeeding André François-Poncet. In June 2023, Laurent Mignon is appointed Chairman of the Board of Directors and Pascal Lebard is appointed Lead Independent Director and Vice-Chairman of the Board of Directors. In July 2023, Geoffroy Roux de Bézieux was appointed as an Independent Director of the Company,
