= Ambroise Roux =

French businessman (1921–1999)

- Born: 26 June 1921; Piscop, Val-d'Oise, Île-de-France, France
- Died: 4 April 1999 (aged 77); Montfort-l'Amaury, Yvelines, Île-de-France, France
- Resting place: Trégastel, Côtes-d'Armor, Brittany, France
- Education: École Polytechnique; École des ponts ParisTech; Supélec
- Occupation: Businessman
- Spouse: Françoise Marion Roux
- Children: 1 son, 1 daughter

Ambroise Roux (26 June 1921 – 4 April 1999) was a French businessman and political advisor. He was the chief executive officer of Compagnie générale d'électricité (later known as Alcatel) from 1970 to 1981. He was the founding president of the French Association of Private Enterprises (AFEP). On his death, President Jacques Chirac called him "one of the great figures of French capitalism."

== Early life ==
Ambroise Roux was born on 26 June 1921 in Piscop, France. His father, André Roux, was a manager in the newspaper industry. His mother, Cécile Marcilhacy, was related to the founders of Rhône-Poulenc, a pharmaceutical company now known as Sanofi.

Roux graduated from the École Polytechnique. During World War II, he was a student at the École des ponts ParisTech and Supélec.

== Career ==
Shortly after the war, Roux worked for his maternal family company, Rhône-Poulenc. In 1951, he began working as an advisor to the Minister of Industry and Commerce, Jean-Marie Louvel. In 1955, he was hired by the Compagnie générale d'électricité. He succeeded his former boss Louvel as its president and chief executive in 1970. During his tenure, he built a private lift for himself and he banned female employees from wearing trousers. He became the highest paid CEO in France. He resigned in 1981, when François Mitterrand became president and nationalized the Compagnie générale d'électricité, which was renamed Alcatel.

Roux served as the vice president of the Conseil national du patronat français and the president of the Commission économique de la Nation, a subcommittee of the French Ministry for the Economy and Finance. As such, he became a political advisor to President Georges Pompidou. He criticized Yvon Gattaz, the president of the Conseil national du patronat français, for not pushing back against Mitterrand's socialist policies. In 1982, he became the founding president of the French Association of Private Enterprises (AFEP). The organization, open to business executives, met at the Hôtel de Crillon to discuss economic policies. In this capacity, he held meetings with President Mitterrand to suggest pro-business policies, but never let the public know whether he was successful or not. In 1993–1995, he encouraged Prime Minister Édouard Balladur to take on a pro-business approach as well, and he continued to do so during the presidency of Jacques Chirac in 1995–2007. He was also an early mentor to François Pinault, the chairman and CEO of Kering who went on to become a billionaire.

Over the course of his career, he served on 57 corporate boards, including Barclays.

== Personal life and death ==
Roux married Françoise Marion in 1946. They had a son, Christian, and a daughter, Véronique. They resided in Montfort-l'Amaury and summered in Trégastel, Brittany. He was royalist.

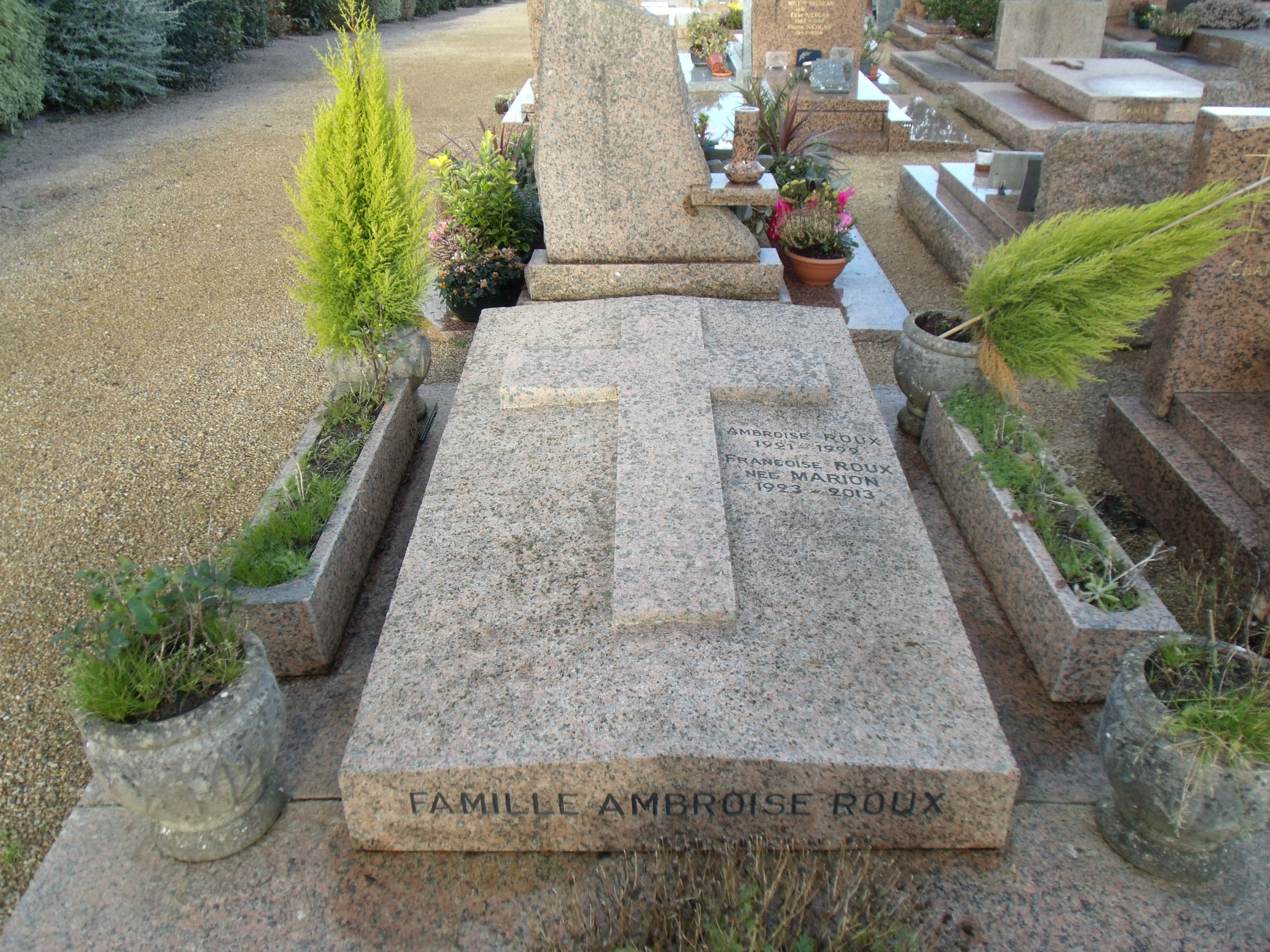
Grave in Trégastel.

Roux died of a heart attack on 4 April 1999 in Montfort-l'Amaury. He was 77. He was buried in Trégastel. On his death, President Jacques Chirac called him "one of the great figures of French capitalism."
