= Piscop =

- Commune
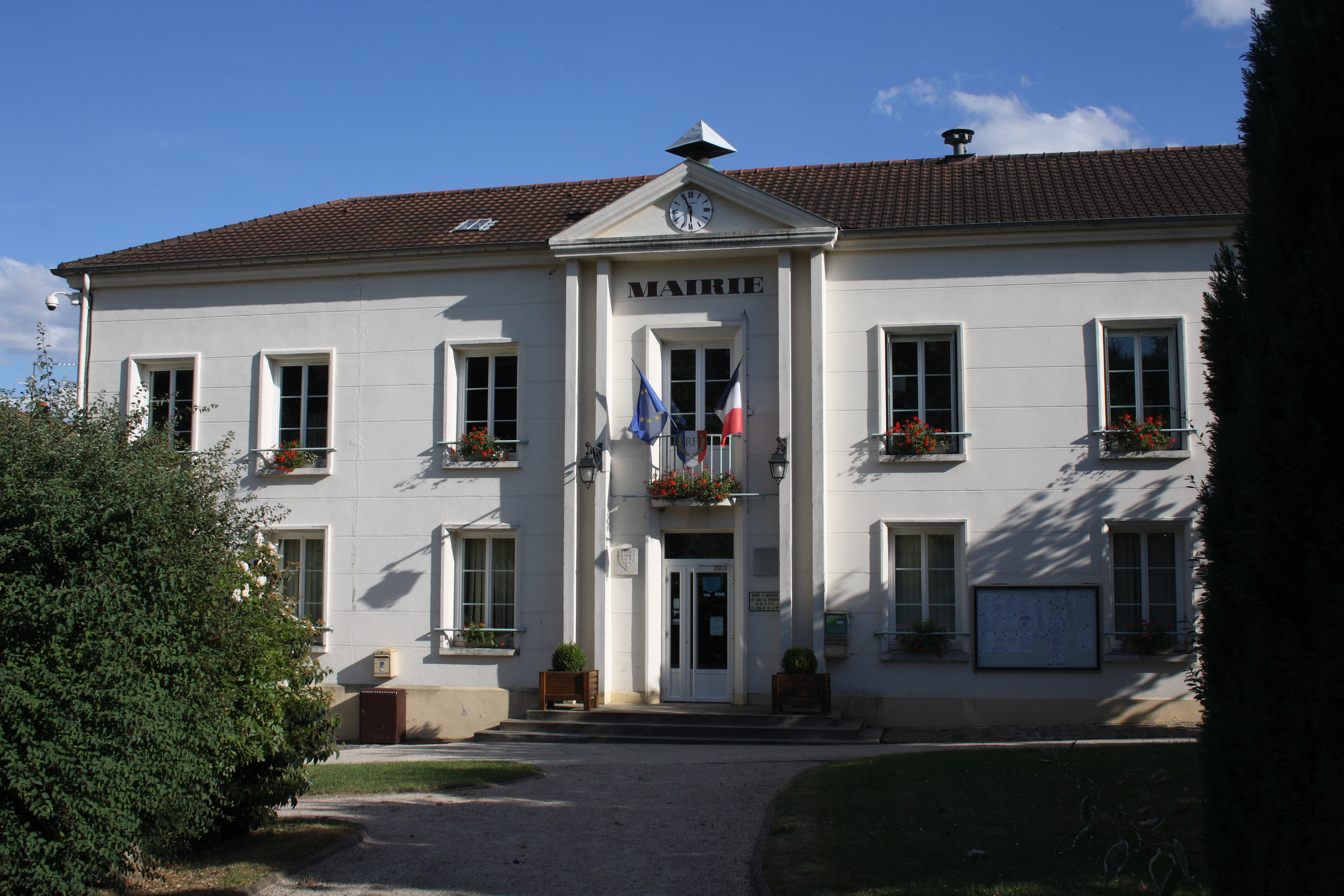
- The town hall of Piscop

- Coat of arms
- Location of Piscop
- Location within France Location within Île-de-France (region)
- Coordinates: 49°00′47″N 2°20′41″E
- Country: France
- Region: Île-de-France
- Department: Val-d'Oise
- Arrondissement: Sarcelles
- Canton: Domont
- Intercommunality: CA Plaine Vallée

Government
  - Mayor (2020–2026): Christian Lagier
- Area^{1}: 4.08 km^{2} (1.58 sq mi)
- Population (2023): 768
  - Density: 188/km^{2} (488/sq mi)
- Time zone: UTC+01:00 (CET)
  - Summer (DST): UTC+02:00 (CEST)
- INSEE/Postal code: 95489 /95350
- ^{1} French Land Register data, which excludes lakes, ponds, glaciers > 1 km^{2} (0.386 sq mi or 247 acres) and river estuaries.

Piscop (French pronunciation: [pisko]) is a commune in the Val-d'Oise department in Île-de-France in northern France.

== Notable people ==
- Ambroise Roux (1921-1999), CEO of Compagnie générale d'électricité (later known as Alcatel) from 1970 to 1981, was born in Piscop.

== See also ==
- Communes of the Val-d'Oise department
