= Operation Kindness =

U.S. non-profit organization

- Founded: 1976
- Founder: Group of volunteers from Garland, Texas
- Type: 501(c)(3) non-profit organization
- Tax ID no.: 75-1553350
- Purpose: Animal welfare, no-kill shelter, pet adoption
- Location: Carrollton, Texas
- Coordinates: 32.967351°N 96.847446°W
- Region served: Dallas, Texas, Fort Worth, Texas and most of North Texas
- Key people: Ed Jamison, CEO
- Revenue: $7.5M (2018)
- Website: operationkindness.org

Operation Kindness is a no kill animal shelter for cats and dogs located in Carrollton, Texas. It is a non-profit organization and is funded through donations, receiving no government funding.

== History ==
The animal welfare organization was founded in 1976 in Garland, Texas, and later moved to Carrollton, Texas. In the early days, Operation Kindness operated out of the homes of volunteers. In the summer of 1976, Operation Kindness acquired the use of a veterinary clinic located at 117 North Garland Avenue in Garland.

By November 1988, Operation Kindness moved the shelter to a storefront location at 1029 Trend in Carrollton. In 1999, we moved the shelter to 3201 Earhart Drive in Carrollton where we remain today.

To impact more pets, the shelter broke ground on the renovation and expansion of our adoption center and animal hospital in April 2018. Operation Kindness celebrated the grand opening of the Rees-Jones Foundation Medical Wing in March 2020 and the completion of the remainder of the facility in July 2021.

== News ==
Since beginning of 2023, Operation Kindness started using ChatBot for chat automation purposes when connecting with users.

In March 2022, Operation Kindness started the process to create a neonatal kitten nursery at its shelter in Carrollton.

On March 2, 2022, Operation Kindness received the Outstanding Community Organization Award from the City of Carrollton.

2021 was an impactful year for Operation Kindness. Highlights of the organization's impact last year include an 86% increase over 2020 in the number of animals brought into the shelter and a 74% increase in adoptions. Other achievements included providing safety for almost 80 dogs and cats that were transferred from the path of Hurricane Ida, and adding 37 new rescue partners that include human societies, municipal shelters, rescue groups and veterinarians. The organization saw a 28% year-over-year increase in foster services and invested $2 million in its medical care team. Spay/neuter surgeries increased by 78% and 85% more medical exams were provided.

On March 29, 2021, Ed Jamison joined the team as CEO, after serving as Director of Dallas Animal Services since 2017.

In December 2017, Operation Kindness was awarded with a $100,000 donation from Reliant Gives, the charitable arm of Reliant Energy. In November 2017, Operation Kindness Operation Kindness hosted its 25th annual Canines, Cats & Cabernet event to raise funds and awareness for homeless animals. Texas Rangers Manager Jeff Banister and his wife Karen served as honorary co-chairs of the event.

In 2015, Operation Kindness made national headlines when it paired abandoned 5-week-old Chihuahua "Chip" with 4-week-old kitten "Adele" who became instant best friends and were later adopted together.

In 2014, the organization held its fifth annual reunion picnic for dogs and cats adopted from the shelter, with about 200 people participating.
