= Atlantic Sapphire =

Norwegian-American aquaculture company

Atlantic Sapphire is a Norwegian-American aquaculture company which focuses on raising Atlantic salmon in recirculating aquaculture systems.

== History ==
Atlantic Sapphire was founded in 2010.

In 2024 the company posted a net loss of 167.3 million.

In February 2025 they signed an agreement to lease their Danish facility to Maiken Foods. Also in February they announced that their earnings before interest, taxes, depreciation and amortization breakeven would be delayed.

=== Florida ===
Atlantic Sapphire first proposed a very large inland recirculating aquaculture system facility in the US State of Florida in 2018. In April 2020 Atlantic Sapphire received a $210 million loan for the construction of a Florida facility. Initial production targets were 9,500 metric tonnes annually and 222,000 tonnes annually by 2031.

In 2020 Atlantic Sapphire began producing Atlantic salmon at a recirculating aquaculture system facility in Homestead, Florida. The site was chosen due to its uncommon layered geology which allows Atlantic Sapphire to pull both freshwater and saltwater from the ground as well as dispose of wastewater underground all at different depths. By March 2020 three million salmon had been born at the Florida facility. The company signed supply agreements with wholesalers, supermarket chains, and value added proscessors like smoke houses. The facility suffered a mass mortality event in 2021. In 2021 three workers fell into a salmon tank and had to be rescued. Later in 2021 the facility suffered a fire.

In 2023 Atlantic Sapphire took on an additional $250 million loan burden to complete the buildout of the Homestead facility. The loan package included county industrial revenue bonds.

In 2023 Atlantic Sapphire convinced its feed supplier Skretting to build a factory in Florida.

In 2024 the Florida facility's salmon was certified by the Aquaculture Stewardship Council.

The Florida facility reached 300,000 pounds of salmon a week by 2025. The company had improved many of its biological processes but remained limited by feed availability.

== Branding ==
In the US the company sells its fish under the brand name Bluehouse Salmon with an emphasis on its relatively small carbon footprint.

== Awards and recognition ==
Atlantic Sapphire received the Star of Innovation at the 2019 European Small and Mid-Cap Awards.

== See also ==
- Aquaculture of salmonids
- Agriculture in Florida
