= Pierre Pringuet =

French businessman (born 1950)

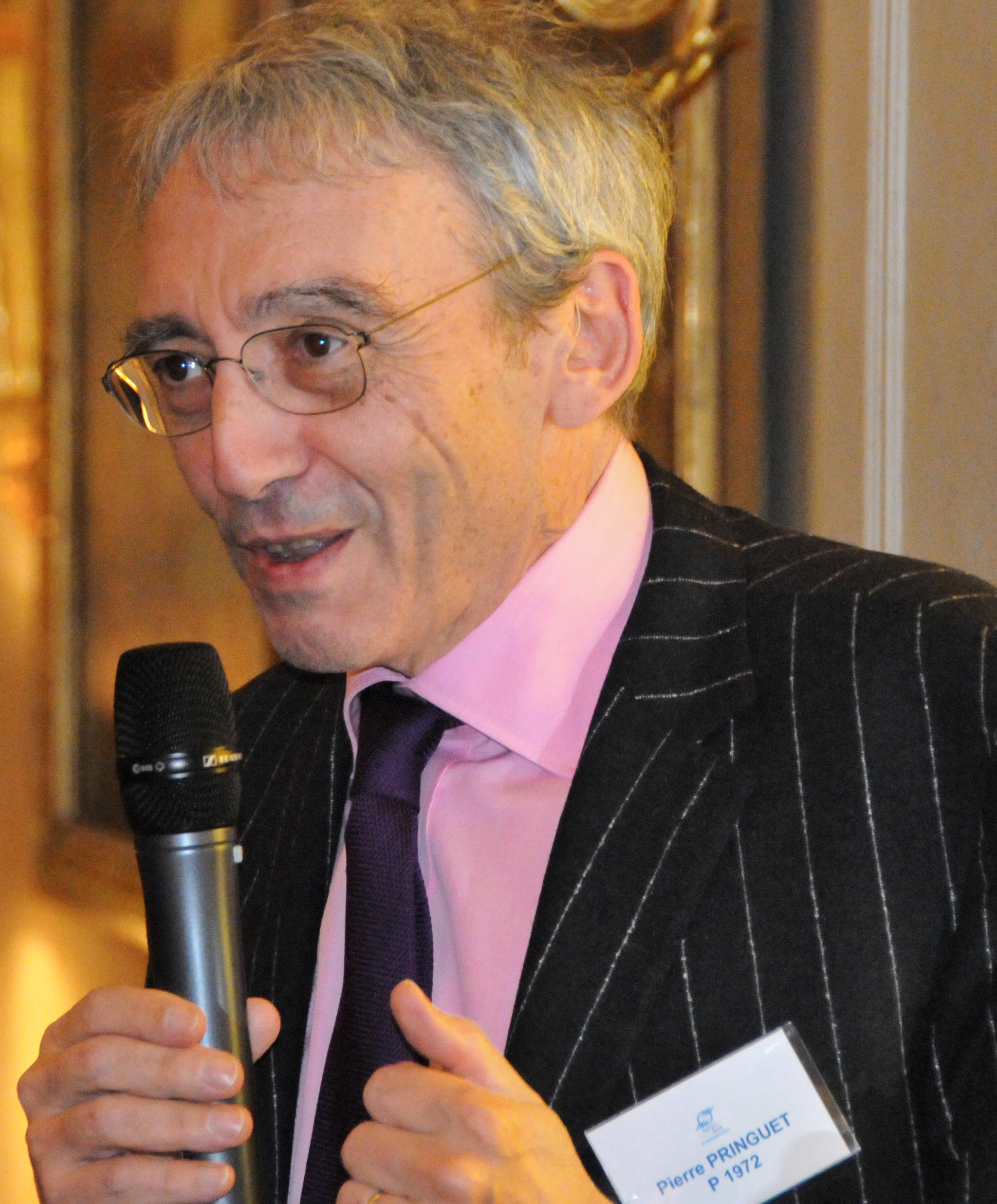
- Pierre Pringuet in 2015
- Born: 31 January 1950 (age 76); Paris, France
- Education: École Polytechnique; Mines ParisTech
- Occupation: Businessman
- Children: 2 daughters

Pierre Pringuet is a French businessman. He was the chief executive officer of Pernod-Ricard from 2008 to 2015. He serves as its vice president, as well as the president of the French Association of Private Enterprises (AFEP).

== Early life ==
Pierre Pringuet was born on 31 January 1950 in Paris. He graduated from the École Polytechnique and Mines ParisTech.

== Career ==
Pringuet began his career as a corps des mines. He was an advisor to Minister Michel Rocard from 1981 to 1985. He joined Pernod-Ricard as development director in 1987. He served as its chief executive officer from 2008 to 2015. He now serves as its vice president. In 2014, he was appointed as the chairman of the Scotch Whisky Association.

Pringuet serves on the board of directors of the Avril Group. He has served as the president of the French Association of Private Enterprises (AFEP) since 2012.

Pringuet is a knight of the Legion of Honour and the National Order of Merit. He is also an officer of the Order of Agricultural Merit.

== Personal life ==
Pringuet has two daughters.
