= Yvon Gattaz =

French businessman (1925–2024)

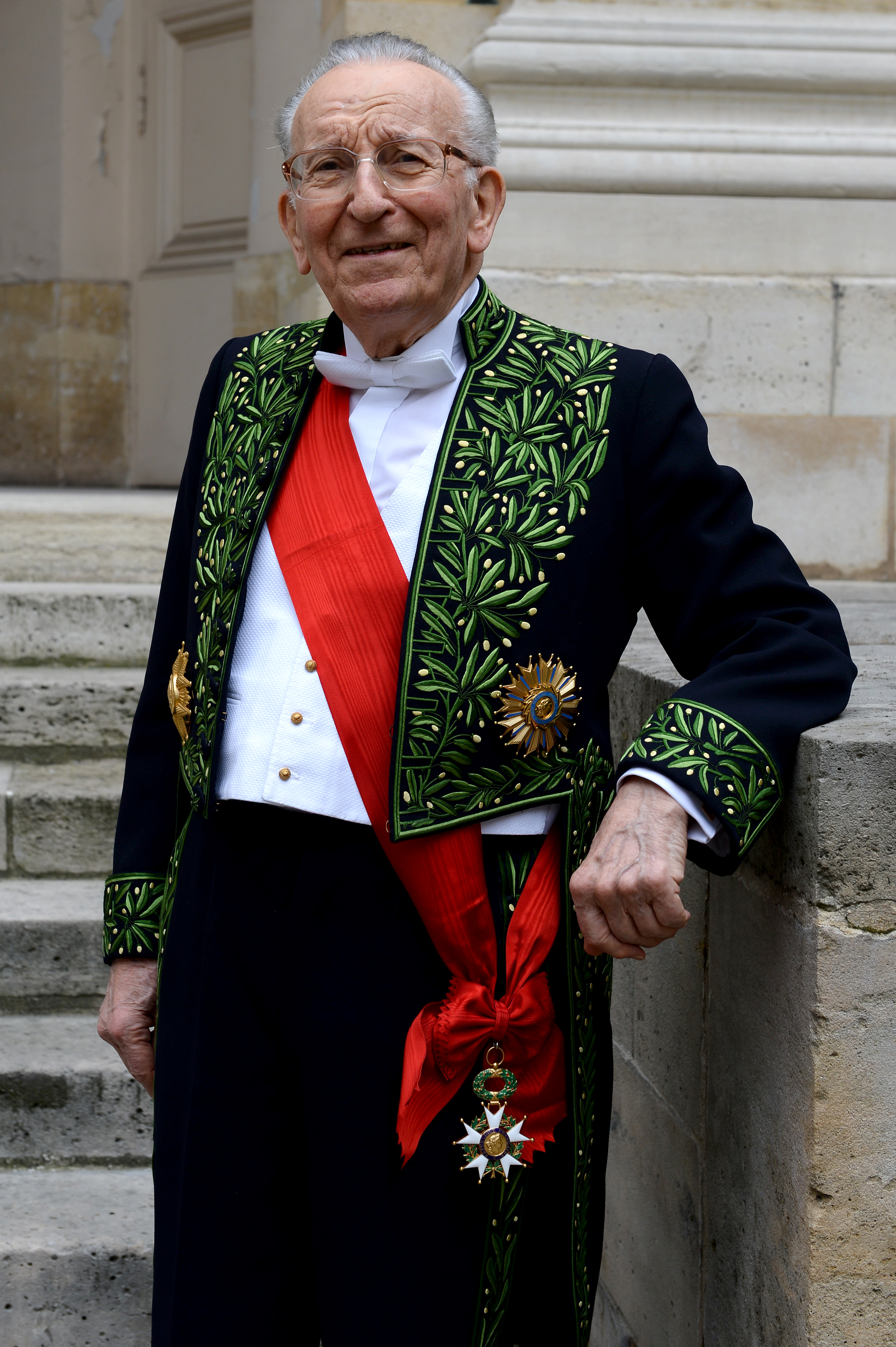
- Yvon Gattaz in 2013
- Born: 17 June 1925; Bourgoin-Jallieu, Isère, France
- Died: 12 December 2024 (aged 99)
- Education: École Centrale Paris
- Occupation: Business executive
- Children: Pierre Gattaz

Yvon Gattaz (17 June 1925 – 12 December 2024) was a French businessman. He was the co-founder of Radiall, an electronics manufacturer. He was President of the Conseil national du patronat français, the main pro-business organization in France, from 1981 to 1986. Gattaz authored many books about free enterprise.

== Early life ==
Yvon Gattaz was born on 17 June 1925 in Bourgoin-Jallieu, near Lyon in France. His father was a schoolteacher. He had a brother, Lucien (1924–2003).

Gattaz graduated from the École Centrale Paris.

== Business career ==
Gattaz worked as an engineer for Aciéries du Nord (later Usinor-Denain) from 1948 to 1950. He worked for Citroën from 1950 to 1954.

Gattaz co-founded Radiall, an electronics manufacturer, with his brother Lucien in 1952. He served as its chairman and chief executive officer from 1952 to 1993. He has served as the chairman of its supervisory board since 1994.

Gattaz served on the board of directors of Moulinex from 1988 to 1993.

== Pro-business advocacy ==
Gattaz served on the board of the Centre national de la recherche scientifique from 1979 to 1981. He served as the President of the Conseil national du patronat français, the main pro-business organization in France, from 1981 to 1986. He was criticized by Ambroise Roux, the founder of the French Association of Private Enterprises, who thought the Conseil national du patronat français under Gattaz's leadership was not sufficiently forceful in pushing back against President François Mitterrand's socialist policy of nationalization.

Gattaz founded Association Jeunesse et Entreprises, a non-profit organization which brings young people and the business world together, in 1986.

Gattaz was inducted into the Académie des Sciences Morales et Politiques on 29 May 1989. He served as its president in 1999. He served on the board of trustees of the Fondation Fourmentin-Guilbert.

Gattaz authored many books about free enterprise.

== Personal life and death ==
Gattaz had a son, Pierre Gattaz, who serves as the Chairman of Radiall and President of the MEDEF.

Yvon Gattaz died in his sleep on 12 December 2024, at the age of 99.

== Bibliography ==
- Les Hommes en gris (Paris:Robert Laffont, 1970).
- La Fin des patrons (Paris: Robert Laffont, 1979).
- Les patrons reviennent (Paris: Robert Laffont, 1988).
- Le Modèle français (Paris: Plon, 1993).
- Mitterrand et les patrons (co-authored with Philippe Simonnot, Paris: Fayard, 1999).
- La Moyenne Entreprise (Paris: Fayard, 2002).
- Mes vies d'entrepreneur (Paris: Fayard, 2006).
- La Seconde Vie : faire de sa retraite un succès (Paris: Bourin Éditeur, 2010).
- Les ETI, entreprises de taille intermédiaire (Paris: Bourin Éditeur, 2010).
- L'Entreprise et les jeunes (Paris: Bourin Editeur, 2011).
- Création d'entreprise: la double révolution (Paris: Eyrolles Éditeur, 2014).
