= LiveChat =

Online customer service software

- Developer: Text
- Initial release: January 10, 2002; 23 years ago
- Operating system: Web-based, Windows, OS X, Android, iOS
- Available in: 41 languages
- Type: AI, Online chat, e-commerce, web analytics, ticketing system
- License: Proprietary (SaaS)
- Website: livechat.com

LiveChat is an AI customer service software with chatbot, online chat, help desk software, and web analytics capabilities. LiveChat is used by over 76,000 companies.

It was first launched in 2002 and is offered via a SaaS (software as a service) business model by Text.

Organizations use LiveChat as a single point of contact to manage customer service and online sales activities with a single program.

== Product ==
LiveChat is proprietary software.

LiveChat's website chat widget can be embedded on customers' websites as a small chat box, often displayed in the bottom right corner of the web browser. It can be used to conduct chats, share files and save transcripts.

The agent application is used by company employees to respond to questions asked by the customers. This is available through both web-based application, desktop applications, and mobile apps.

Web chat sessions can be initiated by the visiting customer, or by the agent, either manually or automatically by the LiveChat system when the visitor meets the predefined criteria (i.e. searched keyword, time on website, encountered error, etc.). LiveChat's system attempts to identify the best prospects visiting a website based on data gathered from past purchasing decisions.

Other features include real-time website traffic monitoring, built-in ticketing system and agents' efficiency analytics.

LiveChat is available in 48 languages.

== Research and reception ==
Reviewing LiveChat's usefulness for online learning in 2020, psychologist Jaclyn Broadbent said "LiveChat occurs as a real-time conversation, it can be time-consuming for staff and disruptive to other tasks." However, using it has resulted in reduced communication traffic from other channels, such as the discussion boards or email. As a teacher, the best time to be available on LiveChat is when you are doing other administrative jobs."

Since 2014 LiveChat has been publishing Customer Service Report - an annual study of customer satisfaction and analysis of online business communication trends. It includes research of thousands of companies and millions of customer service email and live support interactions.

== See also ==
- ChatBot
- Text
