= Gatta =

Gatta is a surname. Notable people with the surname include:

- Bartolomeo della Gatta (1448–1502), Italian painter, illuminator, and architect
- Claudia La Gatta (born 1979), Venezuelan actress and model
- Giuseppe Gatta (born 1967), Italian association football goalkeeper
- Wilma Gatta (born 1956), Italian alpine skier
