= French Association of Private Enterprises =

French organisation

The French Association of Private Enterprises (French: Association française des entreprises privées, AFEP) is a French non-profit organization founded in 1982. It is widely viewed as the main lobby group for large private-sector French companies.

== History ==
The AFEP was founded in December 1982 by Ambroise Roux, former president of the General Electricity Company, after François Mitterrand came to power. From its first year of existence, it brought together 38 of the main large French private companies. In 1990, more than 60 groups joined the Association.

The AFEP brought together almost all the main companies of the CAC 40 and large French companies and large foreign companies with a significant presence in France. In 2016, the 112 member companies totalled a consolidated turnover of 2,600 billion euros and employed over 8 million people worldwide. In France, the number of direct jobs nearly 2 million people.

The AFEP is behind the creation of EuropeanIssuers, the European Association of Issuers (Listed Companies), making it possible to develop common positions on issuers' issues with the main similar European organizations, such as the Deutsches Aktieninstitut (in Germany), Assonime (in Italy), Quoted Companies Alliance (in UK), etc.

== Operations ==
AFEP's work is based on the direct participation of business leaders (presidents, general managers) and their teams in defining economic and social policy orientations as well as in determining the actions to be carried out by the association. They then conduct discussions with the public authorities on the basis of its analyzes and well-argued proposals, in order to contribute to debates, consultations and French and European legislative and regulatory work.

Political decision-makers (ministers, European commissioners, etc.) are regularly invited to come and defend their point of view in front of company directors.

It is headquartered in Paris and has had a representative office in Brussels since 1987.

AFEP has been registered since 2008 in the transparency register of interest representatives with the European Commission. In 2020, it declared annual expenditure for this activity of between 1,000,000 and 1,250,000 euros.

For the year 2017, AFEP declared to Haute Autorité pour la transparence de la vie publique to carry out lobbying activities in France for approximately 600,000 euros.

In April 2020, deputy Matthieu Orphelin wrote to several organizations, including AFEP, to demand them to account for their “lobbying actions during the coronavirus crisis”, pointing to concerted actions with the MEDEF, the French constructors' committee of 'automobiles, the International Air Transport Association (IATA) and aimed at rescinding or delaying environmental standards.

== Leadership ==
=== AFEP chairs ===
- Ambroise Roux (December 1982-November 1998)
- Didier Pineau-Valencienne, CEO of Schneider Electric (November 1998-December 2001)
- Bertrand Collomb, CEO of Lafarge (December 2001-September 2007)
- Jean-Martin Folz, CEO of PSA Group (September 2007-February 2010)
- Maurice Lévy, CEO of Publicis (February 2010-June 2012)
- Pierre Pringuet (June 2012-May 2017)
- Laurent Burelle (May 2017 – present)

=== AFEP general managers ===
- Patrick Rochet (1983-January 2004)
- Alexandre Tessier (January 2004-December 2012)
- François Soulmagnon (December 2012 – present)

== See also ==
- European Round Table of Industrialists
- Business Roundtable in the United States
