= Radiall =

French electronics company

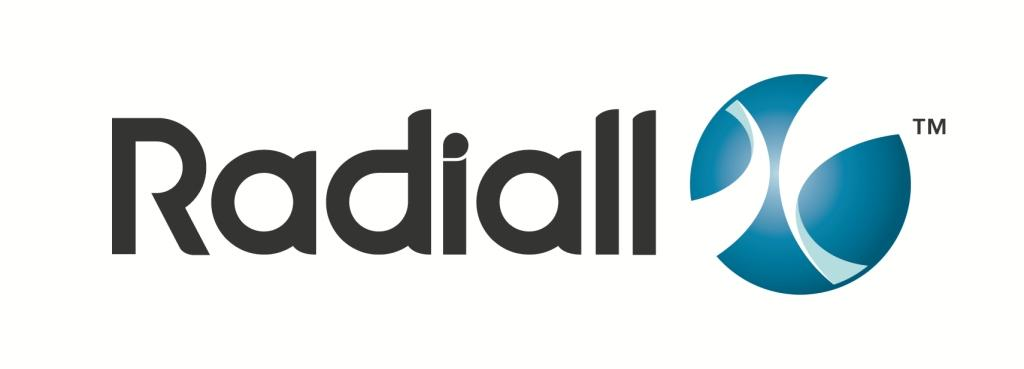
- Type: Public
- Industry: Aerospace; Defense; Industrial; Instrumentation; Medical; Space; Telecommunication
- Founded: 1952
- Founder: Yvon and Lucien Gattaz
- Headquarters: Aubervilliers, France
- Key people: Pierre Gattaz (Chairman)
- Products: RF Coaxial Connectors; Multipin Aerospace Connectors; Fiber Optics; Microwave Components; Antenna; RF Cable Assembly; Outdoor Connectors; Space Qualified Components; RF Cable Assembly; Active Optics
- Owner: Gattaz family (89%)
- Number of employees: 2,987 (2014)
- Website: www.radiall.com

Radiall is a company that designs, develops, and manufactures connectors and associated components for use in electronic applications.

Co-founded by Yvon and Lucien Gattaz in 1952, it is headquartered in Aubervilliers, France. In 2024, Radiall's revenue was 434 million euros.

== History ==
=== 1952–1962 ===
In the spring of 1952, two brothers, Lucien and Yvon Gattaz, founded Radiall. Yvon Gattaz was the entrepreneur who took care of the commercial and financial aspect of the business. Lucien was the inventor. He was more interested in the technical aspects of research and production. In 1953, they bought their first workshop in Paris, France. They had already chosen a slogan: "Speed & Quality."

At that time, France intended to be a world leader in television by using higher frequencies through its SECAM standard. The antenna had to be linked to the TV monitor with a coaxial cable. Yvon and Lucien worked hard to invent a cheap and easy-to-use interconnect that would fit the application. By 1954, Radiall was producing 100,000 connectors per month.

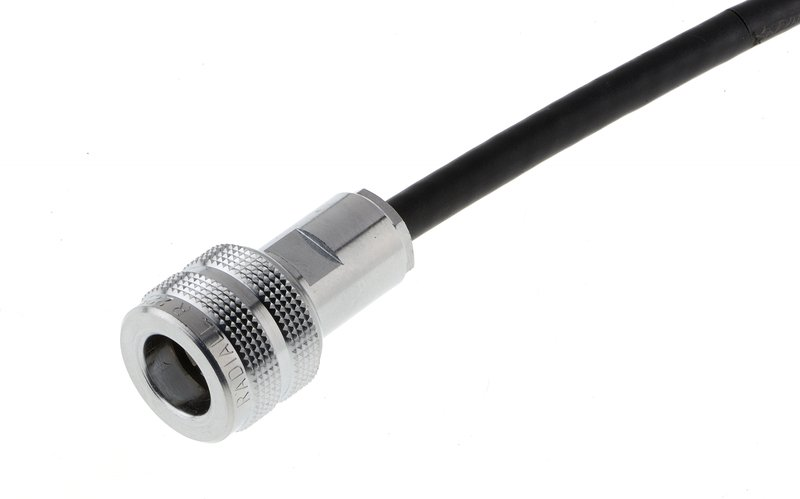
The coaxial connector Mini-Quick

=== 1962–1972 ===
In November 1963, Yvon and Lucien inaugurated their first factory at Voiron in Isere, France. The factory was 2,500 m2 (27,000 sq ft). That same year, the company launched the coaxial connector Mini-Quick. Five years later, in 1968, Radiall built its headquarters at Rosny-Sous-Bois. This 4,000 m2 (43,000 sq ft) two-story building (the third floor came after) is made only of glass and foil.

By 1967, the Gattazes were already thinking about expanding in Europe, so they created a subsidiary in Staines, England: Radiall Microwave Components Ltd. In 1969, they opened another office in Buchslag, Germany: RGmbH. The goal of these new offices was to develop a European sales network.

=== 1972–1982 ===
In 1972, Lucien Gattaz had identified the company Sogie as a competitor in the connector business. It was for sale and showing a deficit, so Radiall made its first acquisition. It only took a few years to make it profitable. Buying Sogie showed Radiall's desire to continue specializing in multipin connectors.

That same year, the company also started getting interested in Aerospace and Fiber Optics. A new facility was built in 1977 in Voreppe, France. A year later, a new factory was created in L’Isle d'Abeau to produce hyper frequency components for military use. France's Prime Minister visited this site on June 6, 1980.

=== 1982–1992 ===
In 1982, Radiall got its first Computer-Assisted-Design equipment. During the 80s, Radiall expanded worldwide with offices in the United States (Stratford, Connecticut), Brazil (Rio de Janeiro) and Asia (Hong Kong) In 1984, Boeing qualified Radiall connectors that comply with the ARINC 600 standard. This was also a period of inventions, as Radiall obtained 15 patents from 1984 to 1986. Radiall also entered the French stock market in 1989, selling 20% of its capital to the public.

=== 1992–2007 ===
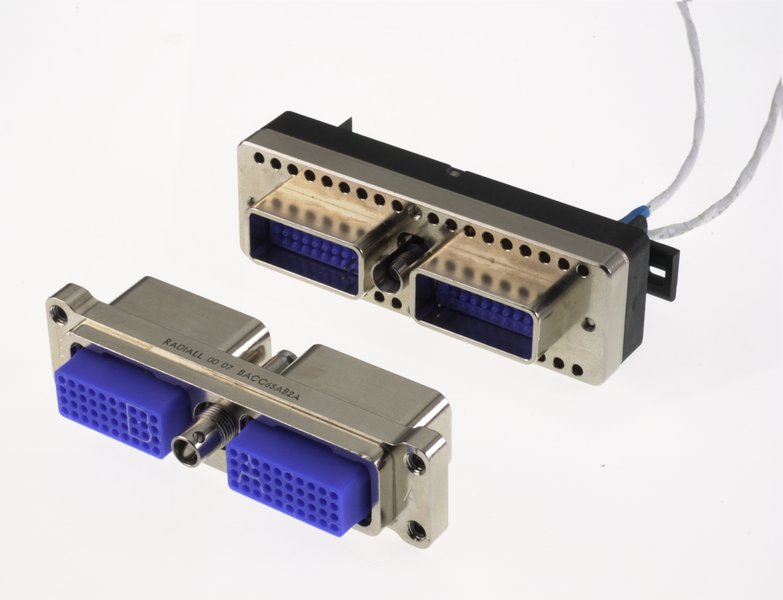
A multipin connector: the EPX

In 1992, Pierre Gattaz, son of Radiall’s co-founder Yvon Gattaz, became the new CEO of the company. In order to become a major US player in the multipin connector business (concerning mostly the Aerospace industry), Radiall acquired Jerrik in May 1995, located in Tempe, Arizona. Radiall continued its expansion in the United States with the acquisition of Larsen, a company based in Portland, Oregon that specialized in antennas for military purposes. In 1994, the company continued to expand in Asia with Radiall Protectron, located in Bangalore, India. Later on, Radiall created a presence in Japan when it opened Radiall Nihon. In 2005, Radiall acquired Applied Engineering Products (AEP) located in New Haven, CT. The AEP product line was integrated into Radiall’s portfolio. Finally, in July 1997, Radiall Shanghai was inaugurated, becoming Radiall’s first entity in China. Radiall's goal was to reach sales of one billion francs by the year 2000, a goal that was actually reached three years early, in 1997. 2001 was a tough year for the company, due to the telecommunication crisis and the September 11 aftermath. This forced the company to reduce its manpower by 30% in two years due to a 40% activity loss.

=== 2008–present ===
On January 8, 2008, Radiall announced an increase in its shareholdings of the start-up D-Lightsys to 95 percent.

On June 1, 2008, Radiall AEP Inc and Radiall USA Inc were consolidated into one company Radiall USA, Inc. The combined company does business as Radiall and covering the North American territory where Radiall currently has 3 sites: Tempe, AZ; New Haven, CT, and Obregon, Sonora, Mexico. The total number of employees is about 1,035.

In 2012, Radiall created an automobile subsidiary, "RAYDIALL."

On July 29, 2015, Radiall announced the acquisition of VAN-SYSTEMS, an Italian company that designs and manufactures circular electrical connectors for industrial applications.

In June 2019, Radiall and CEA-Leti announced a partnership to design RF components for 5G networks and photonics components for harsh environments.

In August 2019, Radiall announced the acquisition of Solyneo.

In August 2019, Radiall USA, Inc. announced it was moving its New Haven, CT site to Wallingford, CT.

In January 2020, Radiall announced it was acquiring Timbercon, a fiber optic interconnect products company.

== Governance ==
Radiall is governed by two boards, a Supervisory Board and an Executive Board.

== Locations ==
Radiall is headquartered in France with expertise centers and manufacturing locations on 3 continents and 13 countries. Radiall's 9 manufacturing plants are located in the United States, Mexico, France, China and India. More than 87% of sales are generated outside of France.
