= European Small and Mid-Cap Awards =

The European Small and Mid-Cap Awards aim to promote best practices and encourage more small and medium-sized enterprises (SMEs) to access capital markets via an initial public offering. A joint initiative of the European Commission, EuropeanIssuers, and the Federation of European Securities Exchanges, the ceremony was organised for the first time in 2013.

== Background ==
The awards ceremony was organised for the first time in 2013 by EuropeanIssuers and the Federation of European Securities Exchanges (FESE), at the initiative of the Directorate-General for Enterprise and Industry (now Directorate-General for Internal Market, Industry, Entrepreneurship and SMEs) of the European Commission. FESE and EuropeanIssuers represent the European securities exchanges and their listed companies, respectively. The awards showcase the diversity of European markets, and aim to promote stock listings, and target SMEs and growth companies.

The awards affirm that listed SMEs are critical to EU's economic growth and the goals of job creation, competitiveness, and growth.

Since 2020, the Awards are organised as part of the European Commission's SME Assembly.

== Awards Categories ==
In 2016, rebranded award categories were launched to include: International Star, Rising Star, Star of Innovation, and Star of 2016.

Since 2017, a further category (Special Mention) was inaugurated. The "Special Mention" recognises an initiative, an individual or a company which has had a significant impact on small and mid-cap issuers accessing the capital market.

== Winners of the awards in their categories ==
=== Winners of the year 2016 ===
- International Star 2016: Gränges

- Rising Star 2016: Oncodesign

- Star of Innovation 2016: Immunovia AB

- Star of 2016: Applegreen

=== Winners of the year 2017 ===
- International Star 2017: ABEO

- Rising Star 2017: Poulaillon

- Star of Innovation 2017: Blue Prism

- Star of 2017: Kotipizza Group

- Special Mention 2017: Foro Capital Pymes

=== Winners of the year 2018 ===
- International Star 2018: Boku

- Rising Star 2018: ATRYS

- Star of Innovation 2018: Polski Bank Komórek Macierzystych

- Star of 2018: Takeaway.com

- Special Mention 2018: Keiretsu Forum

=== Winners of the year 2019 ===
- International Star 2019: Carel

- Rising Star 2019: VR Education

- Star of Innovation 2019: Atlantic Sapphire

- Star of 2019: Admicom

- Special Mention 2019: CEPYME500

=== Winners of the year 2020 ===
- International Star 2020: Diaceutics

- Rising Star 2020: Fodelia

- Star of Innovation 2020: Frequentis

- Star of 2020: Izertis

- Special Mention 2020: Lighthouse

=== Winners of the year 2021 ===
- International Star 2021: Pexip

- Rising Star 2021: FOM Technologies

- Star of Innovation 2021: Nanoform

- Star of 2021: Aluflexpack

- Special Mention 2021: Enlight Research

=== Winners of the year 2022 ===
- International Star 2022: NAKON

- Rising Star 2022: EiDF

- Star of Innovation 2022: SECO

- Star of 2022: GreenVolt

- Special Mention 2022: Rosinger Group

=== Winners of the year 2023 ===
- International Star 2023: Kempower

- Rising Star 2023: Scandinavian Medical Solutions

- Star of Innovation 2023: SolidWorld Group

- Star of 2023: Waga Energy

- Special Mention 2023: Starteepo

=== Winners of the year 2024 ===
- International Star 2024: STIF

- Rising Star 2024: mmcité

- Star of Innovation 2024: Gubra

- Star of 2024: OKWind

- Special Mention 2024: Eurobank
