= EuropeanIssuers =

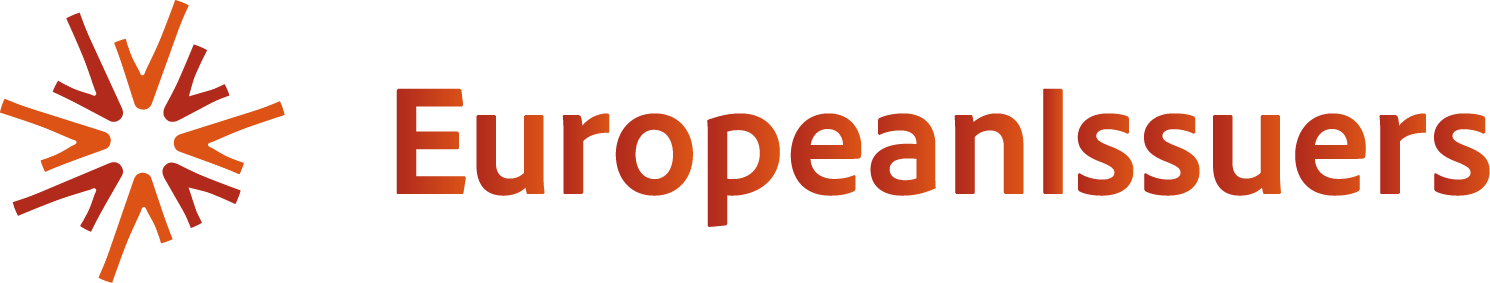
- Merger of: EALIC and UNIQUE
- Legal status: Trade Association
- Purpose: EU Institutional Relations
- Headquarters: Brussels, Belgium
- Region served: Europe
- Secretary General: Florence Bindelle
- Chairman: Luc Vansteenkiste
- Website: http://www.europeanissuers.eu/en/

EuropeanIssuers is an association representing the interests of publicly quoted companies on European stock exchanges. Since 2008, its objective has been to ensure that European Union policy creates an environment where companies can raise capital through the public markets and deliver growth over the longer term.

== Overview ==
The lobby association is registered in the European Transparency Register with the European Commission and Parliament. EuropeanIssuers' members include listed companies and national associations of listed companies from 14 European countries, which represent approximately 6,000 companies.

== History ==
Founded in 2008, as the result of a merger between two associations of listed companies, EuropeanIssuers was created as a not-for-profit association when EALIC, the European Association of Listed Companies, joined with UNIQUE, the Union of Issuers Quoted in Europe.

=== Leadership ===
EuropeanIssuers is led by a board of directors. Luc Vansteenkiste serves as chairman since 2014.

The association is administrated by a secretary general. Florence Bindelle holds this position since 2015. Past secretaries general are Dorien Fransens (2008–2010) and Susannah Haan (2010–2015).

== Working bodies ==
EuropeanIssuers' working bodies consist of the Policy Committee, the Smaller Issuers Committee, and Working Groups. An ad hoc ESG Committee was established in 2022, dedicated to following Sustainable Finance regulatory evolutions at the EU level.

The Policy Committee is the main technical working body of the association. It is composed of senior legal and technical experts who are delegated by our members and bring in strong expertise and first-hand practical experience. The Policy Committee, which convenes on a bi-monthly basis, monitors and discusses all developments of possible concern to issuers. It drafts the position papers in which EuropeanIssuers publicly expresses its members’ views.

The Smaller Issuers Committee, created in 2008, focuses on the specific needs of smaller listed companies. The Smaller Issuers Committee was set up in reaction to the increase of de-listings and the decrease of new listings, due to the ever-growing volume of regulations for listed companies. The goal of the Smaller Issuers Committee is to improve and facilitate the access for smaller issuers to capital markets. There is a need to make it more attractive for an average size company to have its shares listed and publicly traded. Lighter and better regulation for smaller issuers is the main objective. It aims at getting formal recognition by the EU of smaller issuers as a specific sector between SMEs and the largest listed companies in view of benefiting from a “lighter touch regime”. The Committee holds quarterly meetings in different locations in Europe.

EuropeanIssuers' currently active Working Groups are: EMIR, Smaller Issuers, Corporate Reporting, Supervisory Reporting, Capital Markets Union, Securities Law & Markets' Infrastructure, Corporate Governance, Public Country-by-Country Reporting, Prospectus, Market Abuse, Company Law, Corporate Bonds and Financial Transaction Tax.

Only direct members of EuropeanIssuers are eligible to participate in Working Groups.

EuropeanIssuers is also widely represented via its members within European authorities and advisory groups, including EFRAG, the European Securities and Markets Authority, the European Central Bank, and the Best Practice Principles Oversight Committee.

== Activities ==
EuropeanIssuers co-organises the European Small and Mid-Cap Awards along with the European Commission and the Federation of European Securities Exchanges (FESE) since 2013. The Awards are organised to encourage the growth of smaller companies' stock listing, particularly SMEs and growth companies. The Awards showcase the diversity of European markets and aim to promote stock listings, in particular targeting SMEs and growth companies. These companies are critical to European economic recovery and to accomplishing the EU’s goals of job creation, competitiveness and growth.

EuropeanIssuers organised the EuropeanIssuers Capital Markets Forum on 4 and 5 December 2018 in Brussels, Belgium on the occasion of the 10th anniversary. The EuropeanIssuers Capital Markets Forum, organised to commemorate this milestone, provided both a forward-looking and a retrospective overview of the EU regulatory developments. It also offered a platform to exchange views and ensure that EU policy creates an environment where companies of all sizes can easily raise capital through the public markets and deliver growth and jobs over the longer term.

In 2020, EuropeanIssuers launched the Capital Markets Webinar Series. The webinar series addresses the major regulatory developments that are affecting quoted companies in today’s environment. It aims to create a direct dialogue between policymakers to shape a competitive and sustainable environment for businesses in Europe.

EuropeanIssuers organises Advisory Council meetings twice a year since 2018. The EuropeanIssuers Advisory Council brings together around 50 senior executives (chief executives, board members etc.) of major multinational companies. The high-level forum aims to provide European Business leaders the opportunity to discuss the most compelling topics of the European agenda in the field of financial markets with relevant business implications, through a direct dialogue and a privileged interaction with European institutions' top officials and thought leaders. The Advisory Council serves the purpose of strengthening the dialogue between business and politics whilst improving the quality of the European Commission's policy proposals following the debates. It is chaired by Luc Vansteenkiste, Chairman of EuropeanIssuers. Previous chairpersons include Etienne Davignon, Belgian politician, businessman, and former vice-president of the European Commission. The Council welcomed prestigious guests such as Didier Reynders, Mairead McGuinness, Valdis Dombrovskis, Enrico Letta, and Emmanuel Faber.

Since 2023, EuropeanIssuers holds a yearly conference on sustainable finance topics called the Sustainability Reporting Conference. The event gathers auditors, representatives of stock exchanges, issuers, and high-level EU institutional personalities.

== Membership ==
Companies listed on European stock exchanges as well as national associations of listed companies form the direct membership base of EuropeanIssuers. EuropeanIssuers also offers associate membership, as well as stand-alone membership of the ad hoc ESG Committee.

Country	Organisation
Belgium	Association Belge des Sociétés Cotées–Belgische Vereniging van Beursgenoteerde Vennootschappen (ABSC–BVBV)
Belgium	Agoria (ESG Committee)
Belgium	Belgian Investor Relations Association (BelIR) (Associate Member)
Belgium	Euroclear (ESG Committee)
Belgium	Euromines (ESG Committee)
Belgium	European Confederation of Institutes of Internal Auditors (ESG Committee)
Belgium	Nucleareurope (ESG Committee)
Belgium	Solvay
Belgium	Syensqo
Belgium	UCB
Bulgaria	Association of Bulgarian Investor Relations Directors - ABIRD (Associate Member)
France	Association Française des Entreprises Privées (AFEP)
France	Association Nationale des Sociétés par Actions (ANSA)
France	BNP Paribas
France	L'Oréal
France	Middlenext
France	Michelin
France	Saint-Gobain (ESG Committee)
France	Sanofi (ESG Committee)
France	Thales Group (ESG Committee)
France	TotalEnergies
France	Veolia
Germany	Deutsches Aktieninstitut (DAI)
Greece	Union of Listed Companies - ENEISET
Italy	Assicurazioni Generali
Italy	Assonime - Associazione fra le Società Italiane per Azioni
Italy	AssoNEXT - Associazione Italiana delle PMI Quotate
Italy	Edison
Italy	Enel
Italy	ENI (ESG Committee)
Italy	Intesa Sanpaolo
Italy	Mediobanca
Italy	Prysmian
Luxembourg	NowCM (Associate Member)
Netherlands	Royal Philips
Netherlands	ABN-AMRO
Netherlands	Shell
Netherlands	Vereniging Effecten Uitgevende Ondernemingen (VEUO)
Netherlands	Wolters Kluwer
Poland	Stowarzyszenie Emitentów Gieldowych (SEG)
Portugal	Associação de Empresas Emitentes de Valores Cotados em Mercado (AEM)
Romania	Romanian Investor Relations Association - ARIR (Associate Member)
Spain	Emisores Españoles
Switzerland	Novartis
Switzerland	SwissHoldings
United Kingdom	Association for Financial Markets in Europe (AFME) (Associate Member)
United Kingdom	Computershare (Associate Member)
United States	Amazon (ESG Committee Member)
