= Virgin Mobile =

Wireless communications brand

Virgin Mobile logo outside UK & Ireland

Virgin Mobile is a wireless communications brand used by seven independent brand-licensees worldwide. Virgin Mobile branded wireless communications services are available in Ireland, Canada, Colombia, Chile, Kuwait, Saudi Arabia, United Arab Emirates, Poland and Mexico. Virgin Mobile branded services used to be offered in Australia, France, Singapore, India, Qatar, South Africa and the United States.

Each Virgin Mobile branded entity acts independently from the others; thus, the handsets, service plans and network radio interfaces vary from country to country. In a given country, the Virgin Mobile wireless entity is typically a partnership between Richard Branson's Virgin Group and an existing mobile network operator or mobile virtual network operator (MVNO).

== Current brand license holders ==
=== Virgin Mobile Ireland ===
Virgin Mobile Ireland was launched in 2015, at the same time UPC Ireland was rebranded Virgin Media Ireland. Virgin Mobile Ireland is operated by Virgin Media Limited, a subsidiary of Liberty Global and uses the Three network.

=== Virgin Mobile KSA (Saudi Arabia) ===
Virgin Mobile KSA is a telecommunication company operating in the Kingdom of Saudi Arabia. It offers both pre-paid and post-paid plans through over 20,000 sale points in the country. Its offering targets mainly younger population, with flexible price plans and bundles.

=== Virgin Mobile Kuwait ===
On 22 March 2021, STC Kuwait and Virgin Mobile Middle East and Africa (VMMEA) received the Communication and Information Technology Regulatory Authority's approval for the first MVNO licence in Kuwait. They will launch Virgin Mobile Kuwait using STC's network, with STC acting as a host facilities provider.

=== Virgin Mobile Latin America ===
==== Virgin Mobile Chile ====
Virgin Mobile Latin America (VMLA) launched operations in Chile in April 2012, after receiving regulatory approval from Chile's telecommunications regulator and signing an agreement with Movistar, one of the country's leading mobile network operators. VMLA announced in June of this year its plan to become Latin America's leading mobile virtual network operator (MVNO). Since then, the company has made significant progress towards its goal of beginning commercial operations in many countries. Chile was its first commercial operation in early 2012. Richard Branson commented: "We are excited to have made such good progress towards launching our first mobile business in Latin America in Chile. This is an exciting project for Virgin and we believe Virgin Mobile Chile customers will be delighted by the services we will be offering them at launch. We are very appreciative of Subtel’s (Chile’s Subsecretaría de Telecomunicaciones) prompt approval of our application," said VMLA's chairman Phil Wallace.

Virgin Mobile won for three consecutive years the ALCO Customer Loyalty award for having the highest net promoter score (NPS) index in the telecommunications industry in Chile. As of January 2016 Virgin Mobile Chile has a net portability balance of 322,560 customers that have transferred their phone numbers from or to other companies. This figure does not include "non-ported" customers that started with a new phone number.

Some notable product offerings include no contract prepaid plans and a variety of payment options, from top up terminals to PayPal.

==== Virgin Mobile Colombia ====
Colombia was the second South American country that received the Virgin Mobile network. It launched officially plans and services on 3 April 2013, working with Movistar's electromagnetic frequency. The high rate of active mobile lines in Colombia makes this country a good place to set telecom and networks operations. Virgin Mobile took advantage of the 4G spectrum auction in Colombia in June 2013 to release more data services with the fastest mobile speed in the world.

==== Virgin Mobile Ecuador ====
Operations in Ecuador were rumored to start in 2017, using Movistar's network. On 23 September 2019, the Ecuadorian government through a tweet from its former Communications Minister Andrés Michelena, informed about the signature of an agreement that allows Virgin Mobile to start officially its operations in the country. Richard Branson (Virgin Mobile CEO) and Ecuadorian president Lenín Moreno met in NY and signed the agreement.

==== Virgin Mobile Mexico ====
In early 2014, Virgin Mobile Latin America's site for Virgin Mobile Mexico was launched. Since 10 April 2014, it has been possible to purchase micro, nano and regular sim cards through several points of sale located in shopping malls or over the internet. They have reached an agreement to use Movistar's network. In April 2014 they only offered basic prepaid service (voice SMS Data) on a pay-as-you-go basis, and were expected to introduce more diverse offers soon. In June 2016 Virgin Mobile Mexico started to offer LTE access using Band 2.

=== Virgin Plus (Canada) ===
Virgin Plus (formerly Virgin Mobile Canada) experienced substantial growth in 2008, launching approximately 60 'Virgin Mini Stores' (VMS) across the country. VMS are kiosks usually located in shopping malls that especially target the 18- to 35-year-old demographic. For four years running, Virgin Plus has received J.D. Power and Associates' annual award for Highest Customer Satisfaction for Prepaid Wireless. Post-paid plans were introduced to Virgin Canada in February 2008.

Bell Mobility acquired Virgin Plus in May 2009 for CAN$142 million. Some of its stores in Ontario and Quebec are operated by the largest Bell franchise, Cellcom Communications. In early 2010, Virgin Plus launched the iPhone 3G, 3GS and 4 post-paid service in Virgin Plus Retail Stores and online, all around Canada. Virgin Plus became the fifth brand offering the iPhone in Canada, after Fido, Rogers Wireless, Telus, and Bell Mobility.

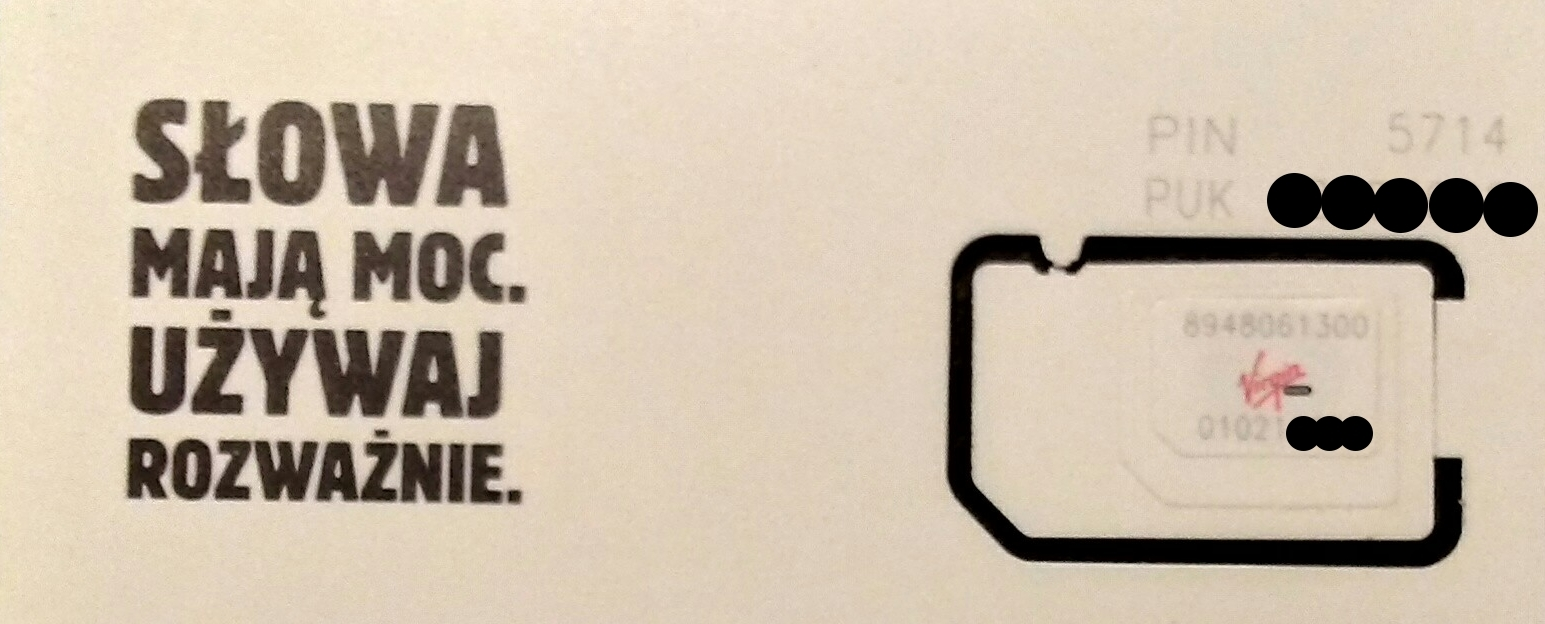
Virgin SIM card in Poland with the slogan of the campaign against hate speech ”Words have power, use them wisely"

=== Virgin Mobile Poland ===
Virgin Mobile Poland is a mobile phone service provider operating in Poland. The company launched in 2012. Being a virtual operator, Virgin Mobile does not maintain its own network, and instead has contracts to use the existing network of Play and T-Mobile.

=== Virgin Mobile UAE ===
Virgin Mobile UAE is a telecommunication company operating in the United Arab Emirates. It offers fully prepaid plans. Its offering targets mainly younger population, with flexible price plans and bundles.

=== Virgin Mobile Russia ===
Virgin Mobile Russia was launched on 27 November 2017 as a mobile virtual network operator under the Tele2 Russia network.

== Former brand license holders ==
=== Virgin Mobile Australia ===
Virgin Mobile Australia (VMA) was a telecommunications company based in Sydney, Australia. They sold through over 73 retail outlets, including flagship stores in Perth, Sydney, Adelaide, Canberra, Melbourne and Brisbane, as well as via telesales and an online store. Virgin Mobile Australia operated on the Optus network.

On 30 May 2018, Optus announced that they would be phasing out the Virgin Mobile brand and would transfer Australian Virgin Mobile customers over to Optus. They said the phase out would take them roughly two years. On 15 June 2018, Virgin stopped selling all prepaid and postpaid mobile plans to customers. In June 2020 Virgin Mobile announced that they were temporarily extending the closure of Virgin Mobile Australia to 30 September 2020 due to the COVID-19 pandemic to help customers stay connected.

=== Virgin Mobile France ===
Virgin Mobile France was a mobile virtual network operator in France that began as a subsidiary of Virgin Group.

Launched in France on 3 April 2006, Virgin Mobile was the fifth mobile operator on the French market and the first MVNO by number of subscribers, with over 2 million customers. Chaired by Geoffroy Roux de Bézieux, Virgin Mobile was commercialized by OMEA TELECOM, a joint venture between Virgin Group and Carphone Warehouse before it was bought in 2015 by the French communication group SFR.

=== Virgin Mobile India ===
On 1 March 2008, Virgin launched the Mobile brand in India through a franchise arrangement with NTT DoCoMo. This was Virgin's seventh launch globally and its largest. However, on 29 March 2008, the Department of Telecom (DoT) cleared the deal after clarification from Tata Teleservices indicated that Virgin had not entered India as an MVNO.

Tata Teleservices merged the company into its existing Tata DoCoMo service on 27 March 2015.

=== Virgin Mobile Peru ===
Virgin Mobile had a short venture in Peru where they failed to achieve the 2% market share they targeted, and the first MVNO from the Peruvian mobile market was eventually sold to another company: Inkacel of Spain.

=== Virgin Mobile Qatar ===
Was introduced as a secondary brand for QTel Qatar Telekom, but, after a process with Vodafone Qatar, Qtel renounced to the Virgin Mobile brand and eventually merged with the original brand name.

=== Virgin Mobile Singapore ===
Virgin Singapore was launched in October 2001 as a joint venture with Singtel. The operations were closed down on 11 October 2002 after failing to attract a significant number of customers.

Failure of the joint venture was attributed to a saturated mobile market and Virgin Mobile's positioning as a "premium" brand.

=== Virgin Mobile South Africa ===
Virgin Mobile South Africa (VMSA) is a joint-venture between Sir Richard Branson's Virgin Group and Cell C. Virgin Mobile South Africa launched in 2006. In February 2011 it was reported that Cell C's 50% stake in Virgin Mobile is to be sold to Virgin Group of the UK and Calico Investments of the Bahamas. Virgin Mobile closed in South Africa on 17 September 2021 after 15 years operation.

=== Virgin Mobile UK ===
Virgin Mobile UK was a mobile virtual network operator, and a division of Virgin Media O2 (joint-owned by Liberty Global and Telefónica). Virgin Mobile UK was the world's first mobile virtual network operator which launched in 1999, and later became part of NTL Telewest. It originally used the coverage of network operator One2One, which later became T-Mobile UK, and then EE.

In 2019, Virgin Mobile UK signed an agreement to move from EE to the Vodafone network. However, it later gave notice of plans to terminate the Vodafone deal in its Q2 2021 financial report, due to Telefónica (owners of O2) acquiring 50% of the business. Network traffic was moved to the O2 network during 2022, and in January 2023, Virgin Media O2 announced that the Virgin Mobile UK brand would close. In August 2023, the transfer of Virgin Mobile UK network users to the O2 network was completed. Virgin Mobile UK no longer offers new services, however existing customers still remain legally contracted to Virgin Mobile UK, with O2 providing their services.

=== Virgin Mobile USA ===
Virgin Mobile USA was a no-contract mobile virtual network operator owned by Sprint Corporation. It licensed the Virgin Mobile brand from United Kingdom-based Virgin Group. Virgin Mobile USA was headquartered in Kansas City, Missouri, and provided service to approximately 6 million customers.

Founded in 2001 as a joint venture between Virgin Group and Sprint Corporation, Virgin Mobile USA commenced operations in June 2002 as a mobile virtual network operator (MVNO), providing services via the Sprint 1900 MHz CDMA network. In 2009, Sprint Nextel bought out joint-venture partner Virgin Group, becoming the sole owner of Virgin Mobile USA.

In June 2017, Virgin Mobile dropped all Android and began to only offer iPhones to new customers under its new "Inner Circle" unlimited plan. Following the discontinuation of the plan in 2018, it began to restore Android devices to its line-up.

In January 2020, Virgin Mobile announced that it would shut down, and transfer its remaining customers to its sister brand Boost Mobile the following month.
