= Geoffroy Roux de Bézieux =

French businessman (born 1962)

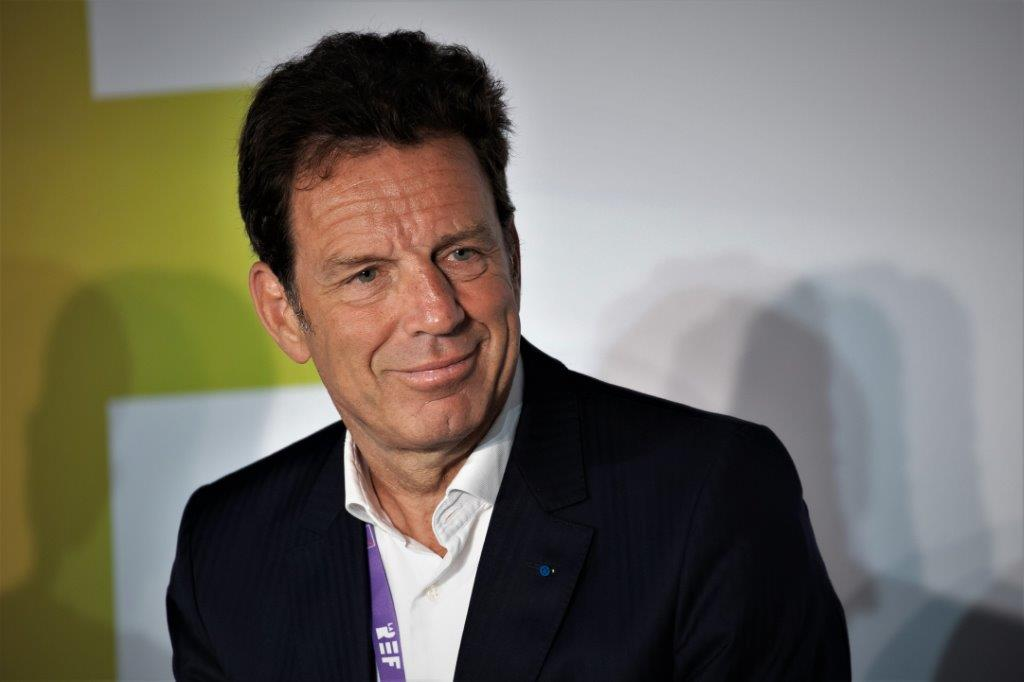
- Roux de Bézieux in 2023

President of the Mouvement des Entreprises de France
- In office 3 July 2018 – 17 July 2023
- Preceded by: Pierre Gattaz
- Succeeded by: Patrick Martin

Personal details
- Born: 31 May 1962 (age 64)

Geoffroy Roux de Bézieux (born 31 May 1962) is a French businessman. He founded The Phone House in 1996 and Omea Telecom in 2004, and launched Virgin Mobile France in 2006. From 2008 to 2010, he served as president of UNEDIC. From 2018 to 2023, he served as president of the Mouvement des Entreprises de France.

== Biography ==
Geoffroy Roux de Bézieux was born on May 31, 1962, in Paris.

In 1984, Geoffroy Roux de Bézieux graduated from ESSEC and also earned a master's degree from Paris Dauphine University.
