= Pierre Gattaz =

French business executive (born 1959)

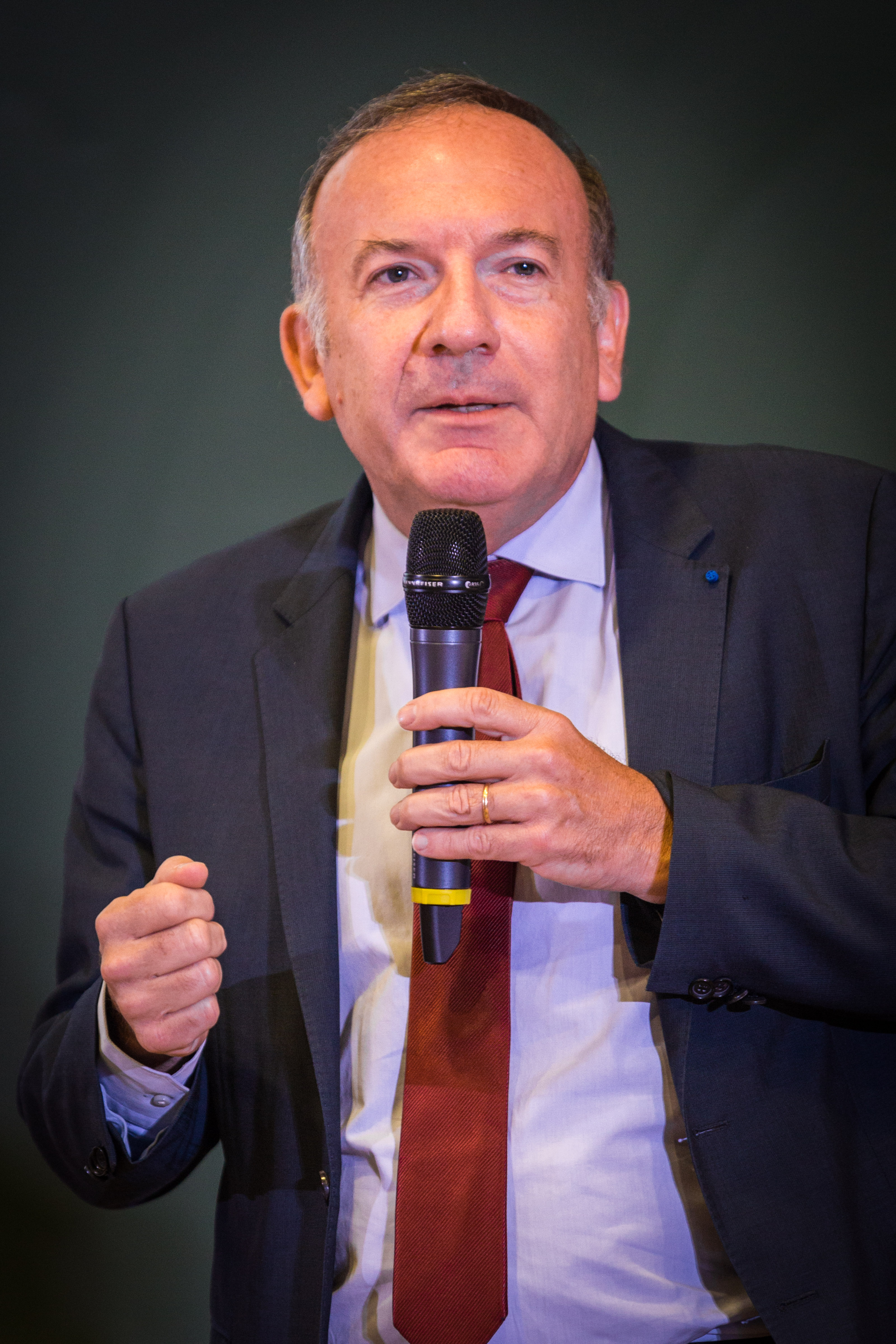
- Gattaz on 3 September 2015
- Born: Pierre Gattaz; 11 September 1959 (age 66); Boulogne-Billancourt, France
- Education: École nationale supérieure des télécommunications de Bretagne
- Known for: Chairman of the Executive Board for Radiall President of the Executive and Strategic Committee for Radiall President of the MEDEF (2013-2018)
- Predecessor: Laurence Parisot
- Successor: Geoffroy Roux de Bézieux
- Spouse: Marie-Aude Gattaz
- Children: 4
- Parent: Yvon Gattaz

Pierre Gattaz (born 11 September 1959) is a French business executive. He serves as the Chairman of Radiall, an electronics manufacturer. In parallel with his activity as a company director, he holds various positions within professional organisations, first of all sectoral and then generalist, including that of President of the Federation of the Electrical, Electronic and Communication Industries (FIEEC) from 2007 to 2013. He was then President of the main French employers' organisation, the Mouvement des Entreprises de France (MEDEF), from 3 July 2013 to 3 July 2018, and then President of the BusinessEurope lobby, a position he still holds.

== Early life ==
Pierre Gattaz was born on 11 September 1959 in Boulogne-Billancourt, near Paris, France. His father, Yvon Gattaz, co-founded Radiall, an electronics manufacturer, in 1952, and served as the President of the Conseil national du patronat français, a precursor to the MEDEF, from 1981 to 1986. Pierre Gattaz has indeed family ties in Creuse on the side of his wife Marie-Aude Gattaz, in the sector of La Souterraine.

Gattaz graduated from the École nationale supérieure des télécommunications de Bretagne, where he received a bachelor of science degree in engineering. He received a certificate in administrative management from George Washington University in Washington, D.C.

== Career ==
Gattaz worked as a business attache at the Embassy of France, Washington, D.C. He returned to France to work for Dassault Electronique, a subsidiary of the Dassault Group, from 1984 to 1989. He served as General Manager of Fontaine Electronique Convergie, a subsidiary of Dynaction, from 1989 to 1992.

Gattaz joined the family business, Radiall, as General Manager in 1992. He has served as its Chairman since 1994. Under his leadership, the corporation has expanded from the defense sector into telecommunications and aeronautics. He also increased its marketshare in the United States, India, Japan and China. He relocated a plant to Mexico in order to raise more capital for research and development.

Gattaz served as the President of the Groupement professionnel des industries de composants systèmes électroniques (GIXEL) in 1999. He was President of the Fédération des Industries Electriques, Electroniques et de Communication in 2007. Since 2013, Gattaz has served as the President of the Mouvement des Entreprises de France, the main pro-business organization in France. He is a proponent of deregulation.

Gattaz serves on the Conseil national de l’industrie. He is a member of La Fabrique de l'Industrie, a pro-business think tank.

Gattaz is a Knight of the Legion of Honour and an Officer of the National Order of Merit.

== Personal life ==
Gattaz is married to Marie-Aude Gattaz, a city councillor for The Republicans in Le Vésinet. They have four children.

== Bibliography ==
- Gattaz, Pierre. Le Printemps des magiciens : La Révolution industrielle, c’est maintenant ! (Paris, France: Nouveau Monde Editions 2009; 191 pages).
- Gattaz, Pierre. La France de tous les possibles. 2016.
