= Tourism in Yemen =

Traditionally, Yemen has been a tourism centre for centuries as it is in the middle of the trade routes of the Middle East and the Horn of Africa. Tourism played a fundamental role in the region in global trade and has remained so until the 20th century. Afterwards, there has been a sharp decline in tourism since the 2011 Yemen Crisis. The rise of extremism caused fear in prospective foreign tourists to Yemen. Yemen has four World Heritage Sites, some of the sites have been attacked including historic old city of Sana'a. In 2015 UNESCO declared its plan to protect the world heritage sites of Yemen.

"It is evident that the destruction of their culture directly affects the identity, dignity and future of the Yemeni people, and moreover their ability to believe in the future"

-Irina Bokova (Director-General of UNESCO)

== Visa policy ==
Citizens of Jordan, Egypt, Syria, Hong Kong and member states of Gulf Co-operation Council do not require visas when entering Yemen. Tourist and business visas do not need an exit visa prior to departure. Those who are staying in Yemen for more than two weeks are required to register at their nearest police station. Failure to register can result in a fine of YR 5,000 at the time of departure.

== Travel advice ==
Various nations have published travel advice for their citizens who visit Yemen. This advice usually includes matters relating to safety and security, terrorism, local laws and customs and entry requirements. Advice given by the United Kingdom says to respect local Islamic customs. They advise visitors to dress modestly and to refrain from drinking alcohol in public; especially during the Islamic month of Ramadan. The UK also warns about possible terror attacks in tourist places or the kidnap of foreigners by militant groups. Majority of the world's countries have advised their citizens regarding the current situation in Yemen and have discouraged travelling to the country until the issues concerning terrorism are solved or managed properly. However, some nations, such as the Philippines, Taiwan, and Japan, have also noted that once terrorism has been managed properly, tourism partnerships can be offered to Yemen immediately.

The UAE is being accused of transporting foreign tourists to Socotra Island without permission from the Yemeni government. This is an attempt to encroach on Yemen’s sovereignty.

== Attractions ==
There are four World Heritage Sites in Yemen – three are cultural while one is natural. The cultural sites are the Historic Town of Zabid, Old City of Sana'a and Old Walled City of Shibam while the natural site is Socotra Archipelago. In addition, Yemen has identified 10 sites that meet the standards of World Heritage Centre, namely Archaeological site of Marib, Historic city of Saada, Historic City of Thula, Madrasa Amiriya of Rada, Jibla and its surroundings, Jabal Haraz, Jabal Bura, Balhaf/Burum coastal area, the Hawf Area, and Sharma/Jethmun coastal area.

In July 2015 a two-day meeting was held in UNESCO headquarters in Paris which established an "Emergency Action Plan" in response to the widespread destruction of cultural sites in Yemen. The emergency action plan will coordinate the international response of "Unite4Heritage". Yemen's ambassador to UNESCO Ahmed Sayyad urged the world community to co-operate tor protection the heritage sites in Yemen. He said that the historic cities in Yemen are not just "my cities" but these are the cities of every Yemeni, every Arab, every Muslim and every man and woman in the world whatever their religion. It is the responsibility of everyone to protect the heritage sites of Yemen from destruction.

== Gallery ==
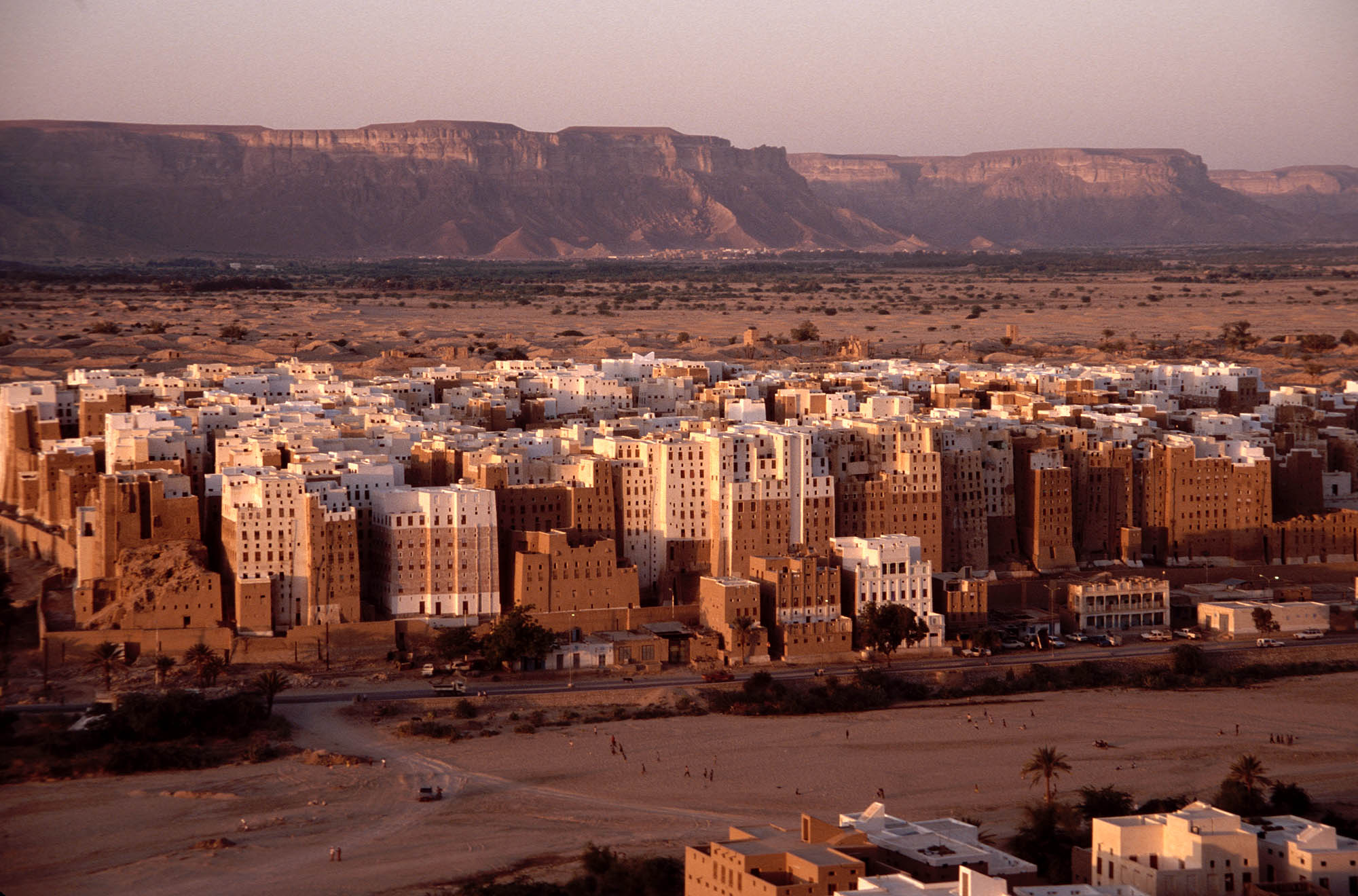
Old Walled City of Shibam, UNESCO World Heritage Site

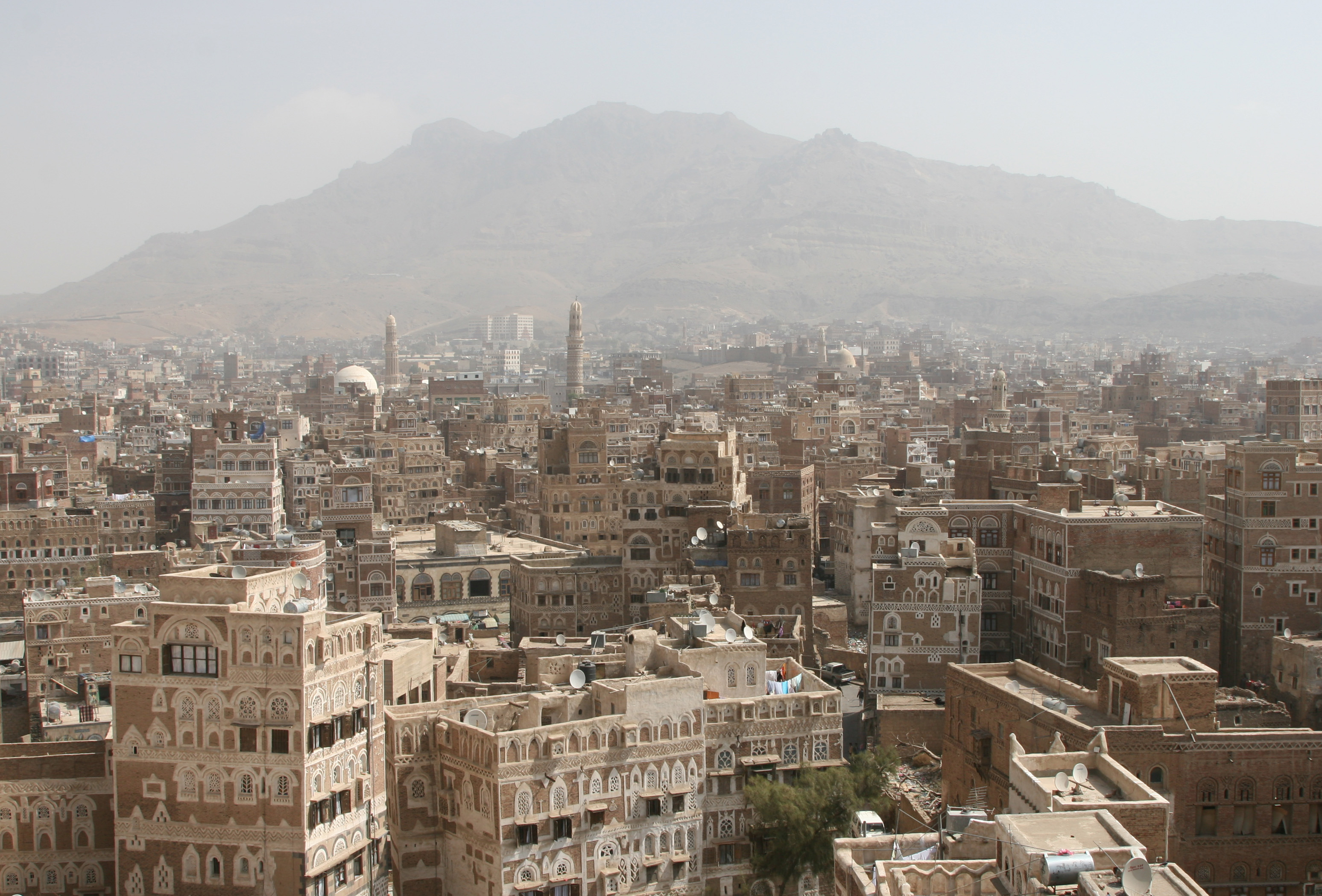
Old City of Sana'a, UNESCO World Heritage Site

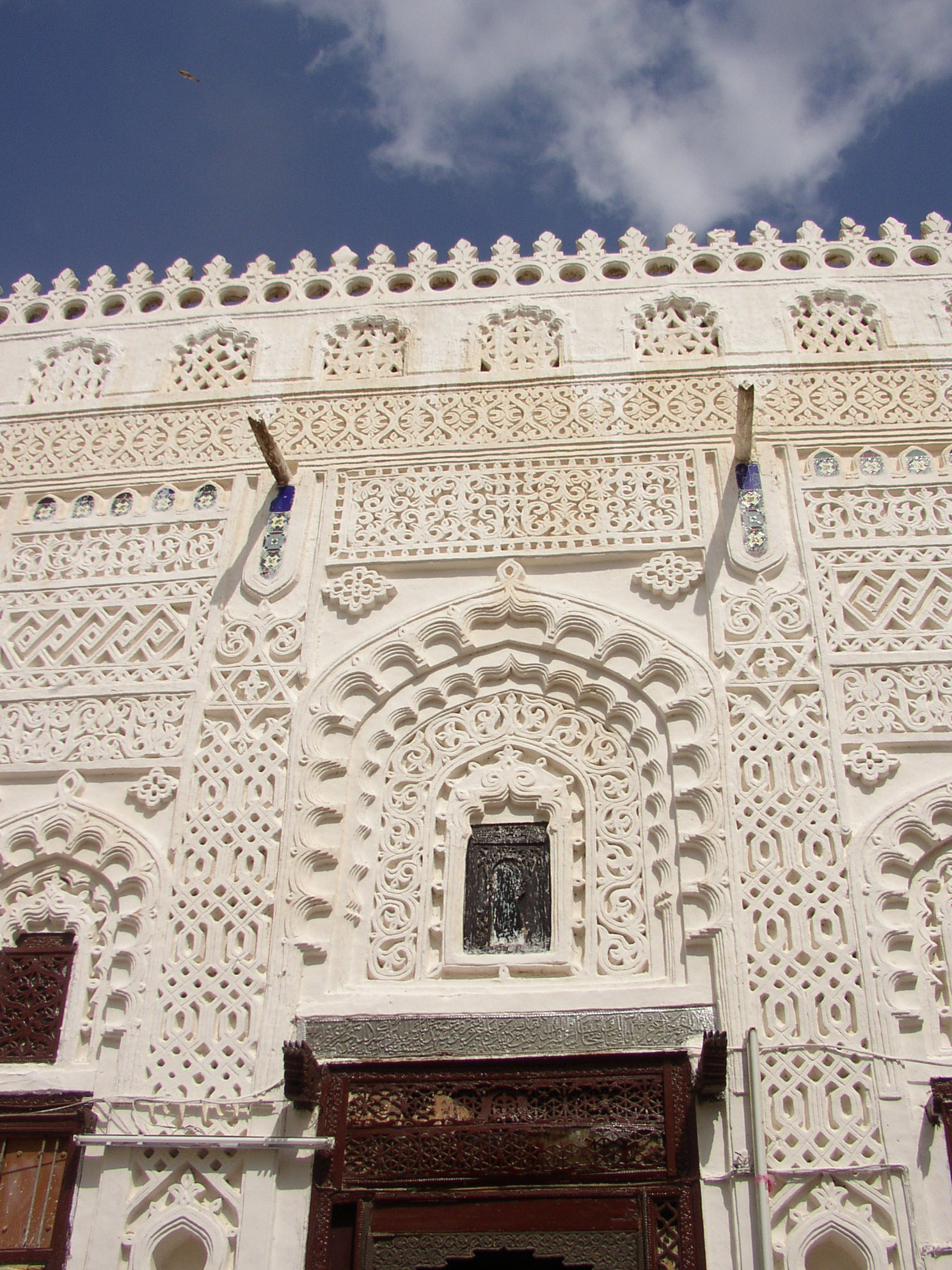
Old City of Zabid, UNESCO World Heritage Site

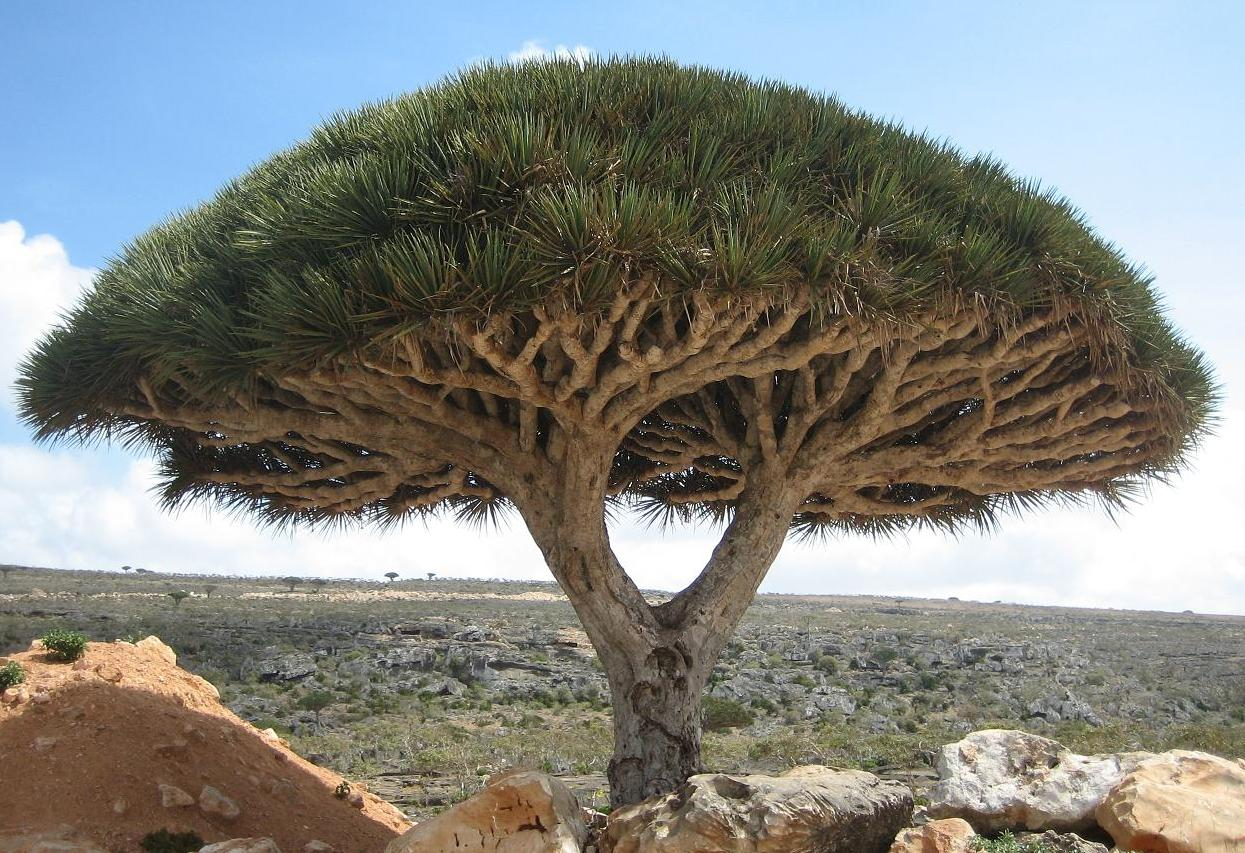
Socotra dragon tree at Socotra, UNESCO World Heritage Site

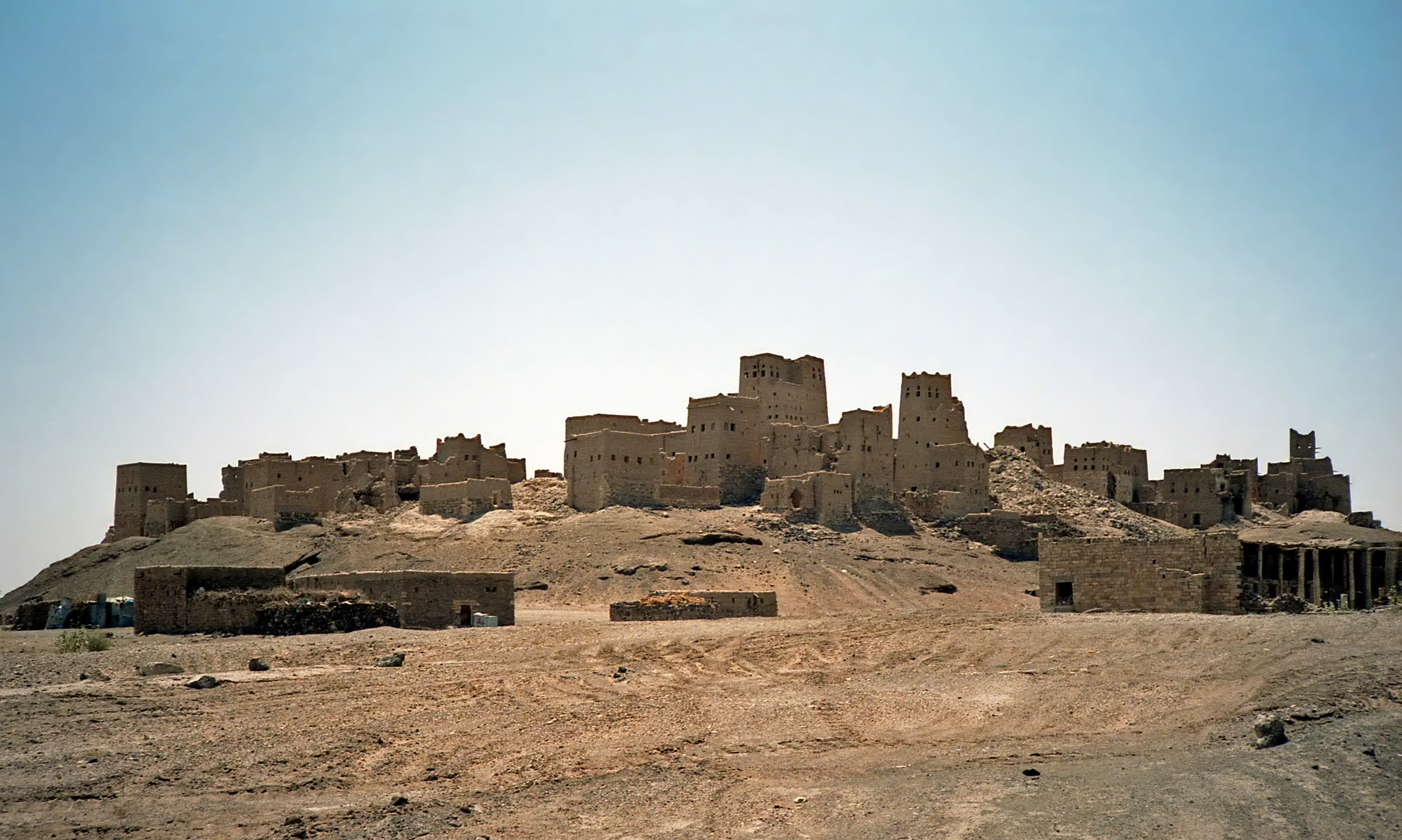
Archaeological site of Marib, UNESCO Tentative Site

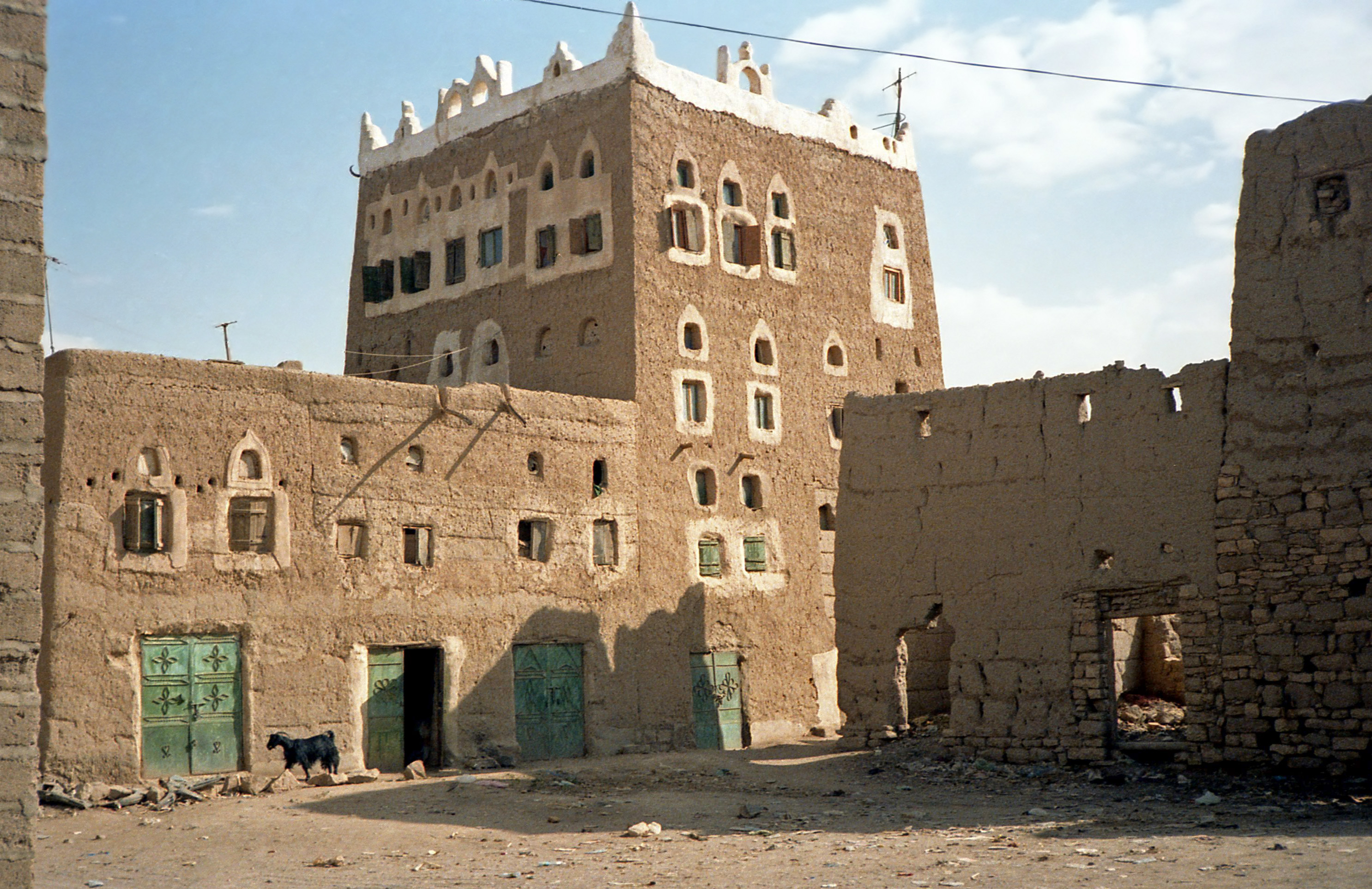
Historic city of Saada, UNESCO Tentative Site

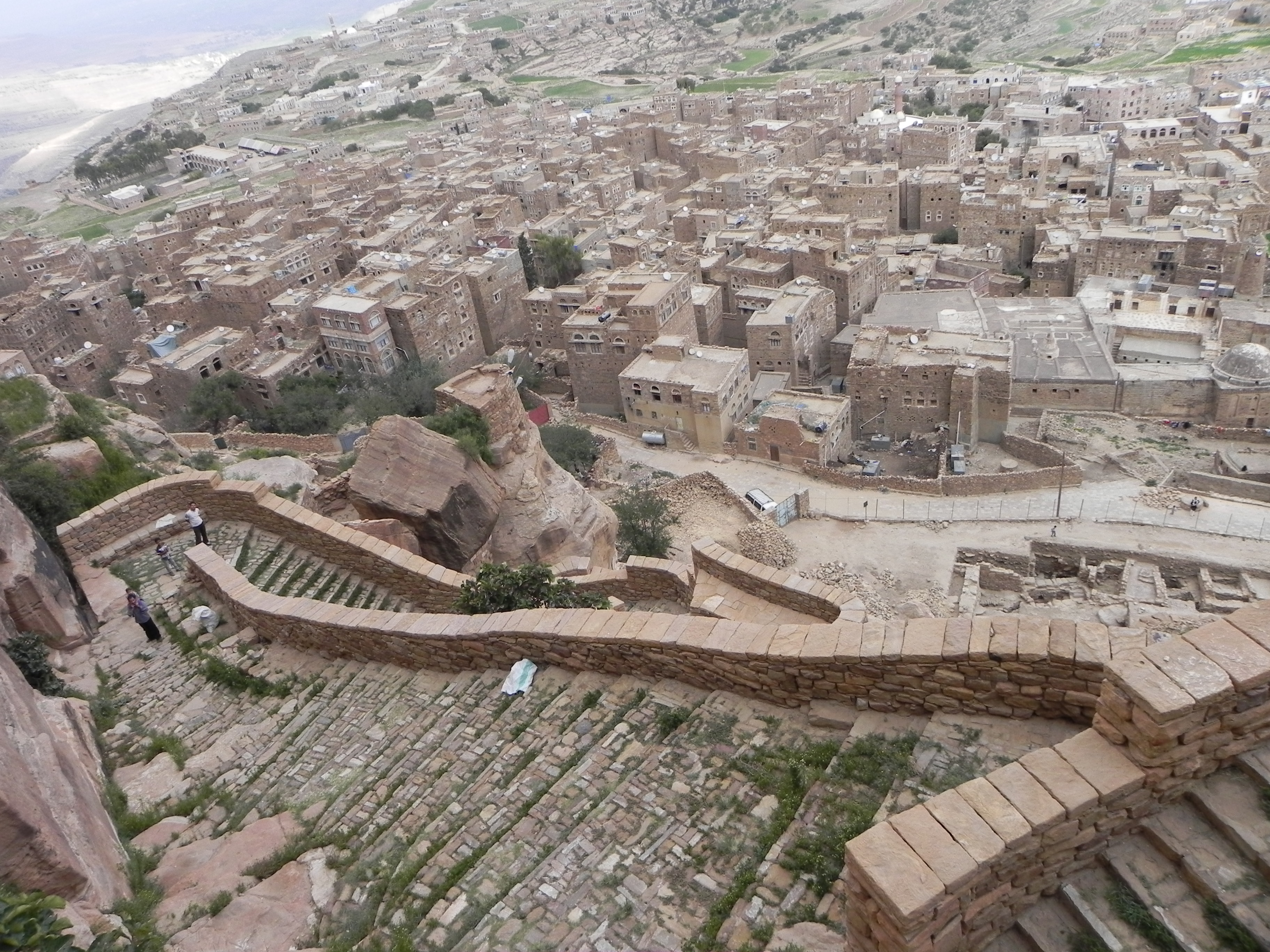
The Historic City of Thula, UNESCO Tentative Site

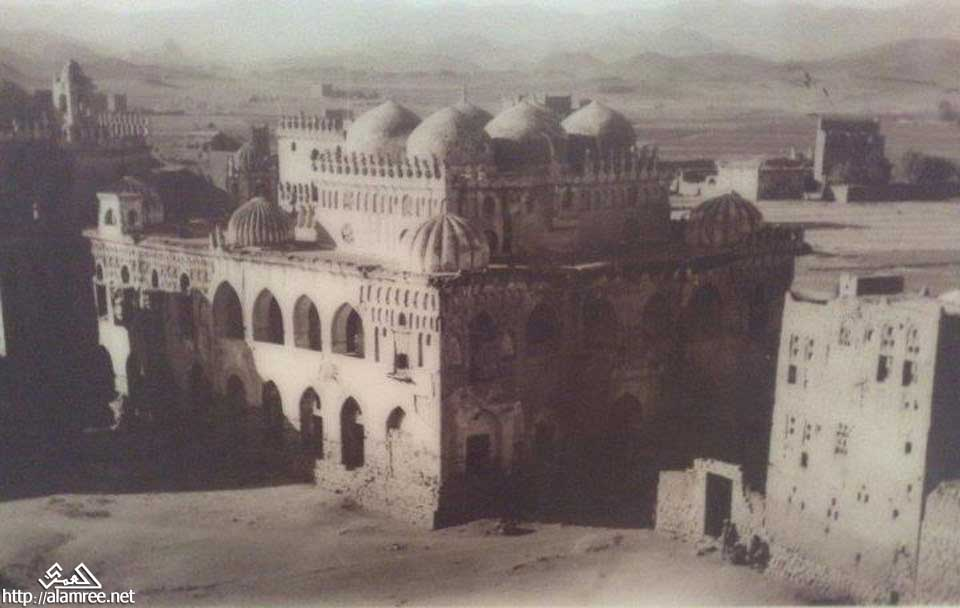
The Madrasa Amiriya of Rada, UNESCO Tentative Site

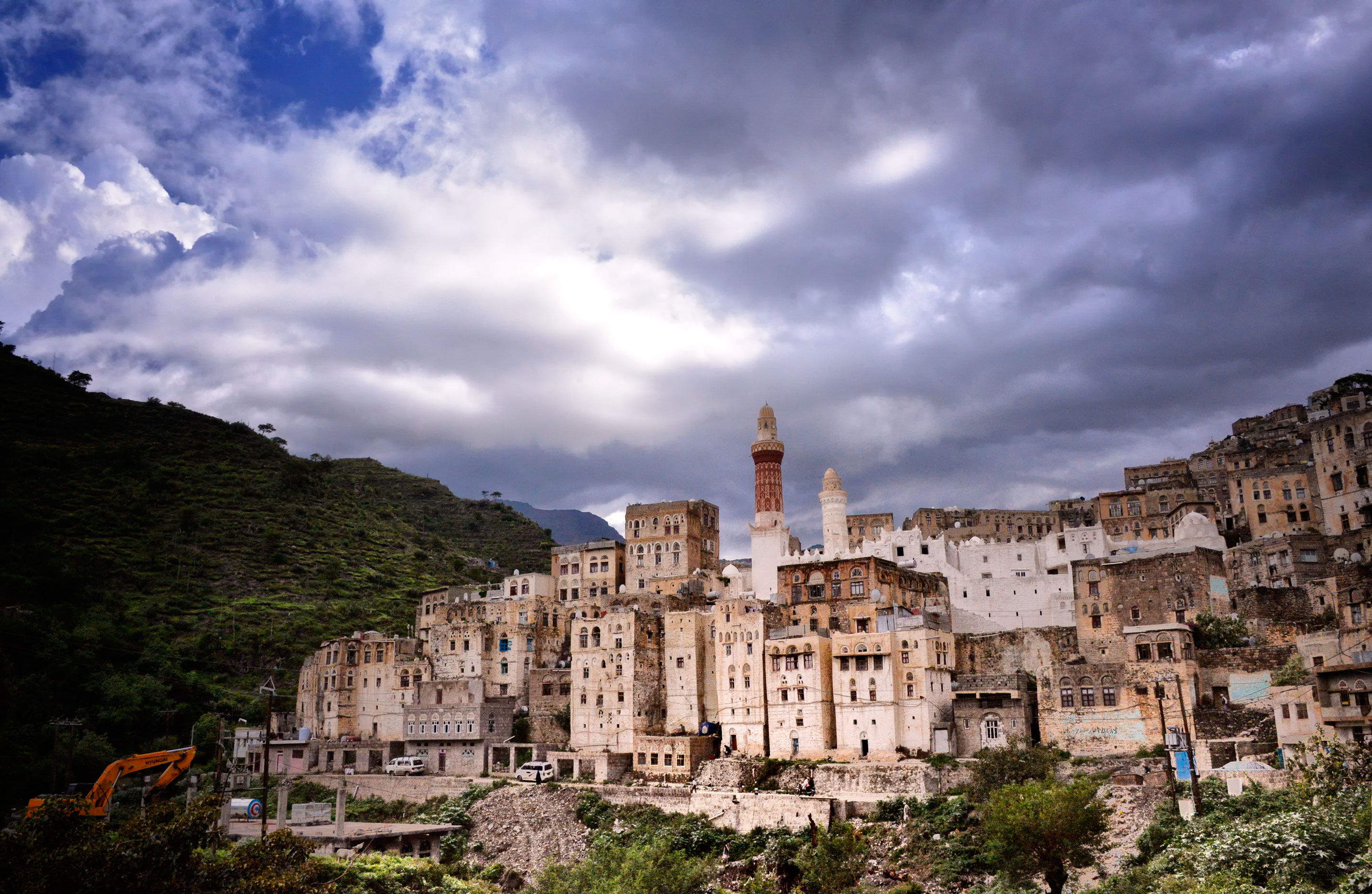
Jibla and its surroundings, UNESCO Tentative Site

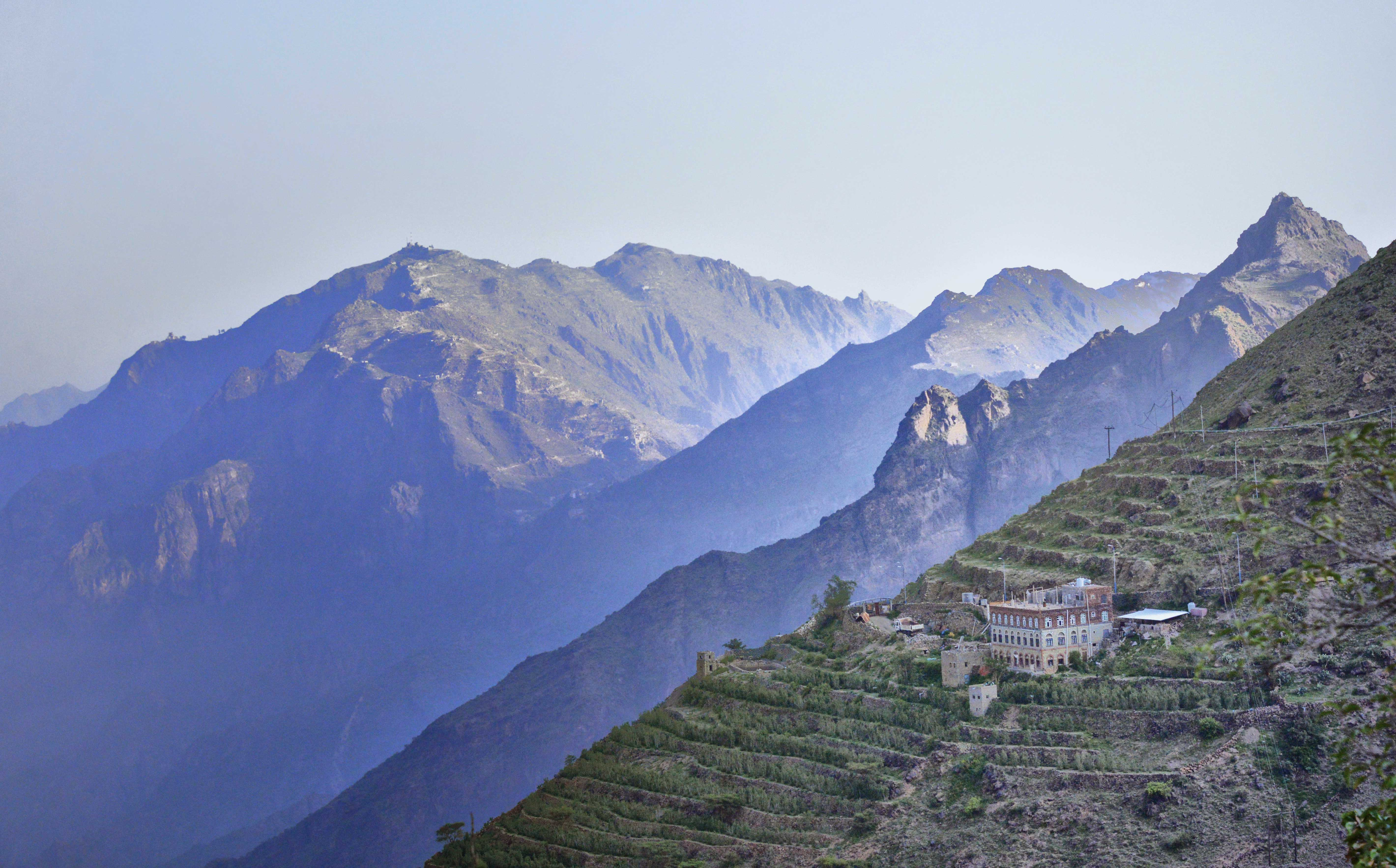
Jabal Haraz, UNESCO Tentative Site

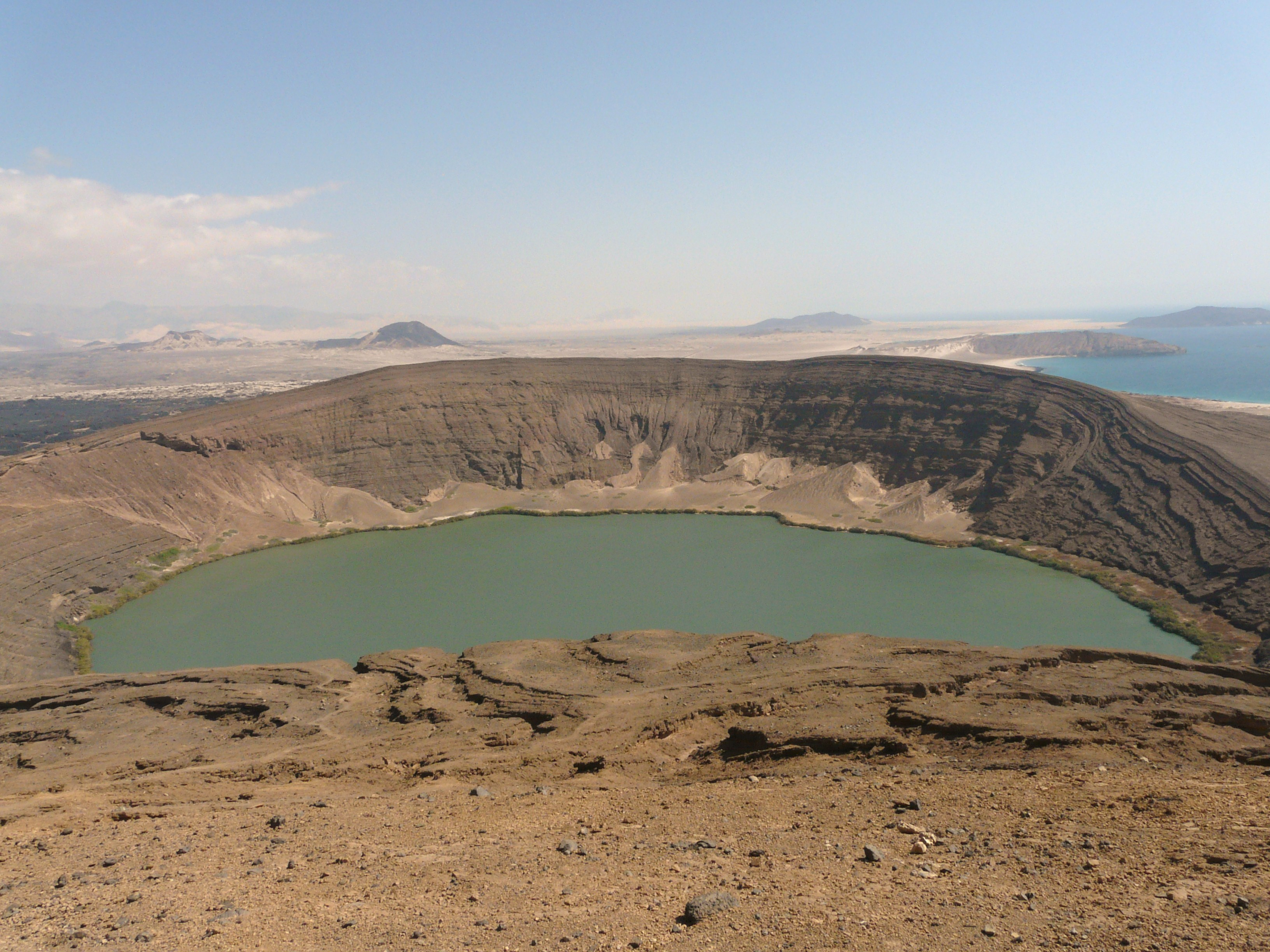
Balhaf/Burum coastal area, UNESCO Tentative Site

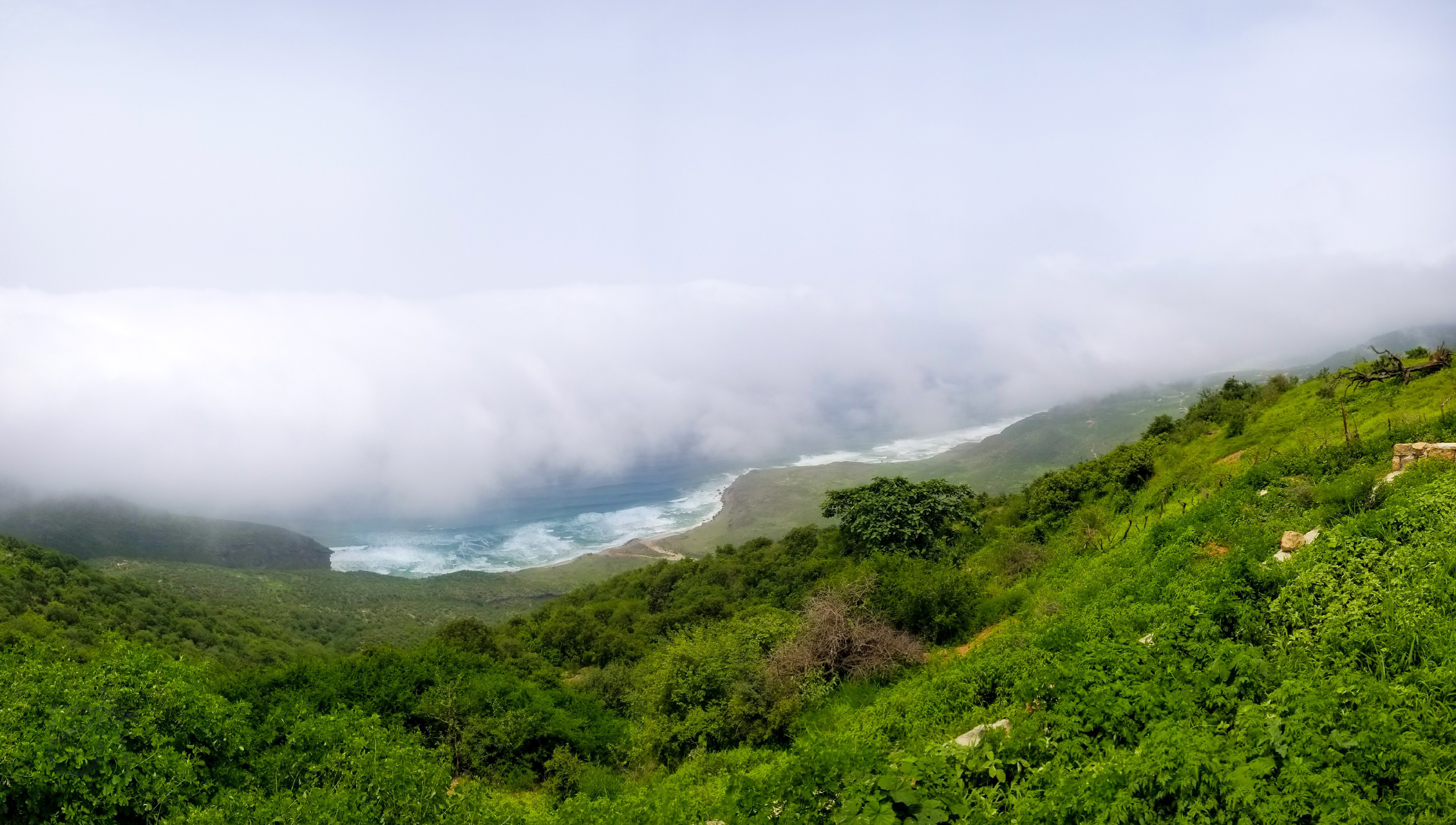
Hawf, UNESCO World Heritage Site
