= Shenzhen Book City (Central) =

Bookstore in Shenzhen, China

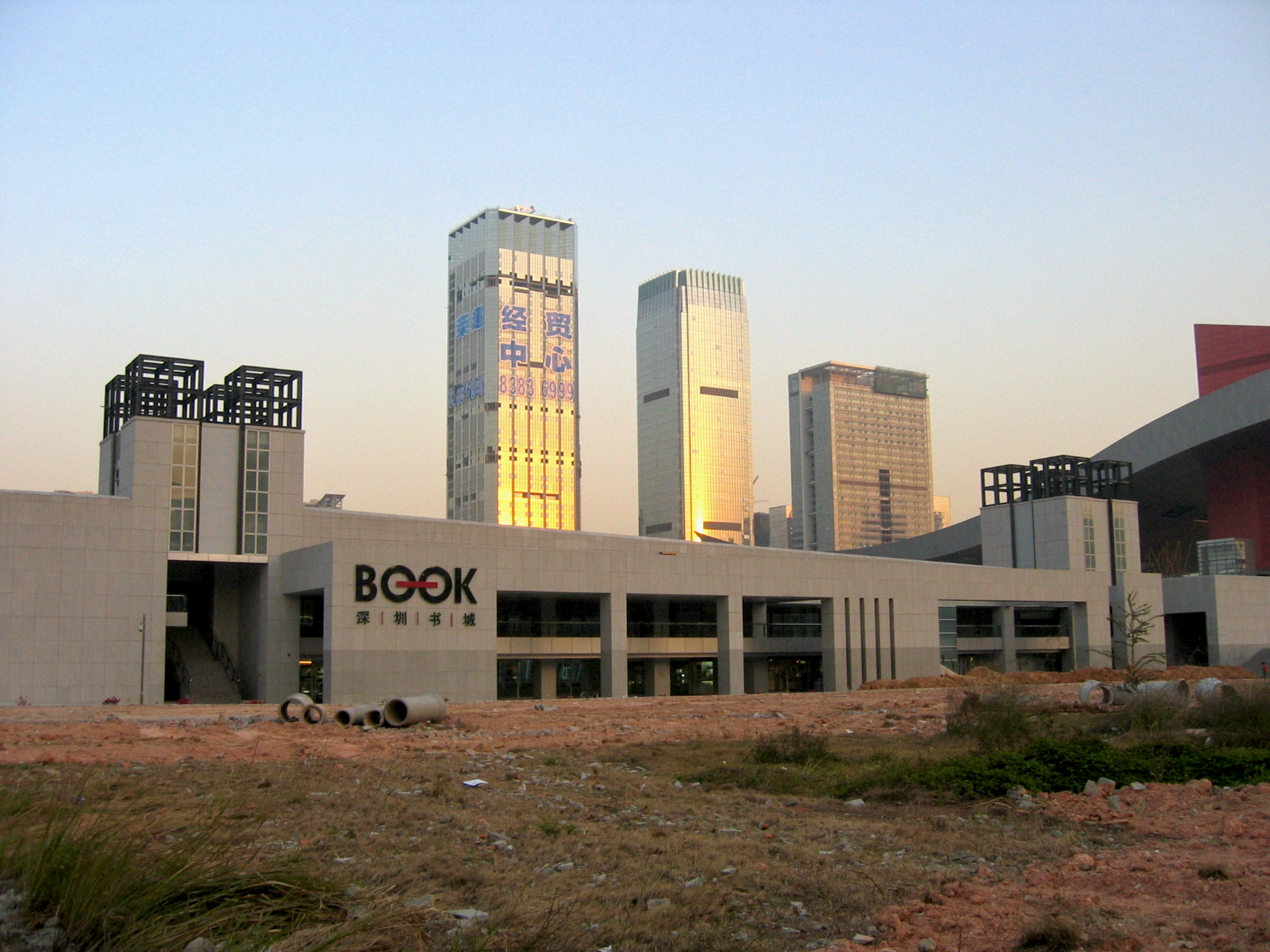
Shenzhen Book City (Central)

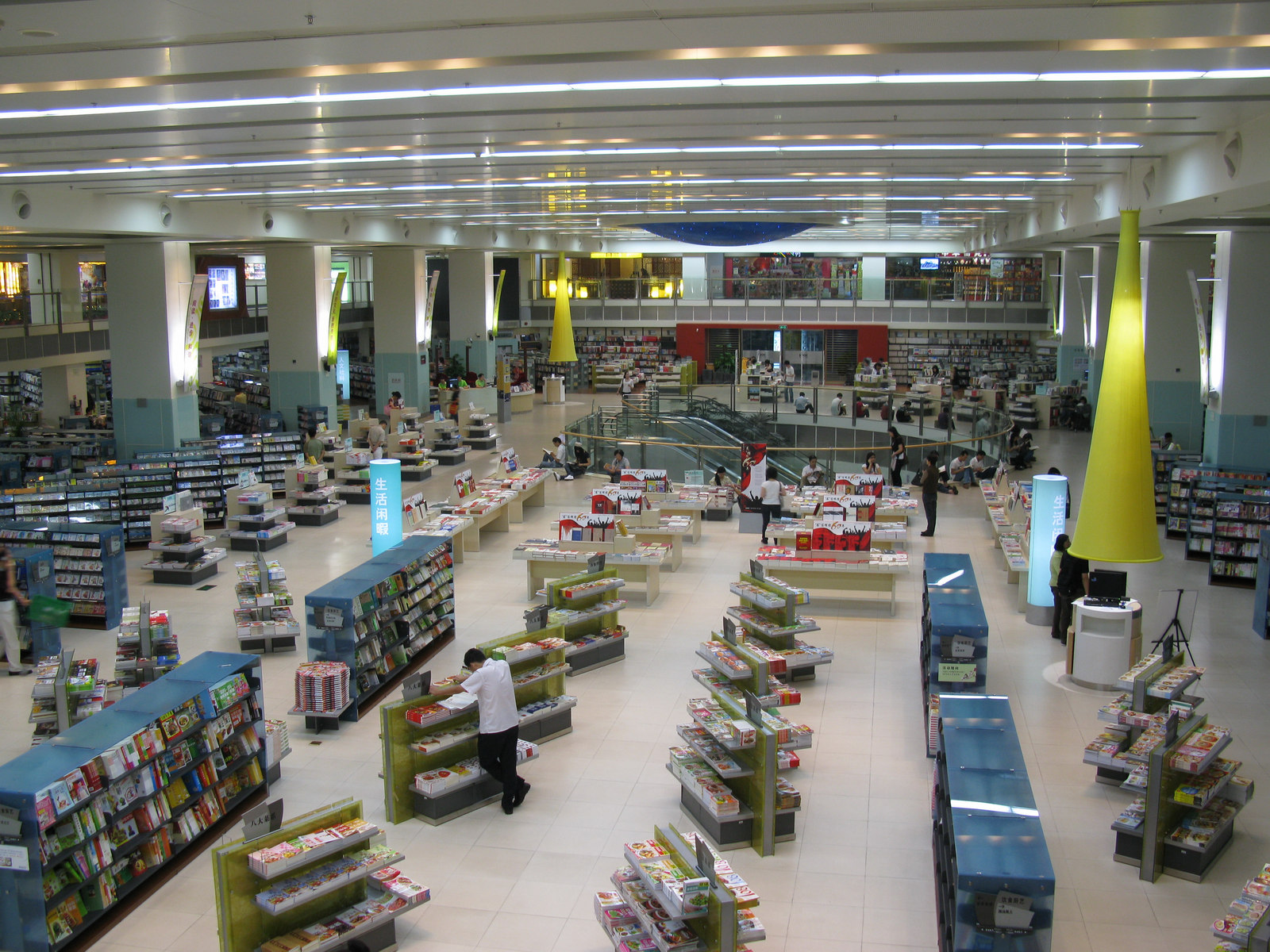
Life Leisure Bookstore of Shenzhen Book City (Central)

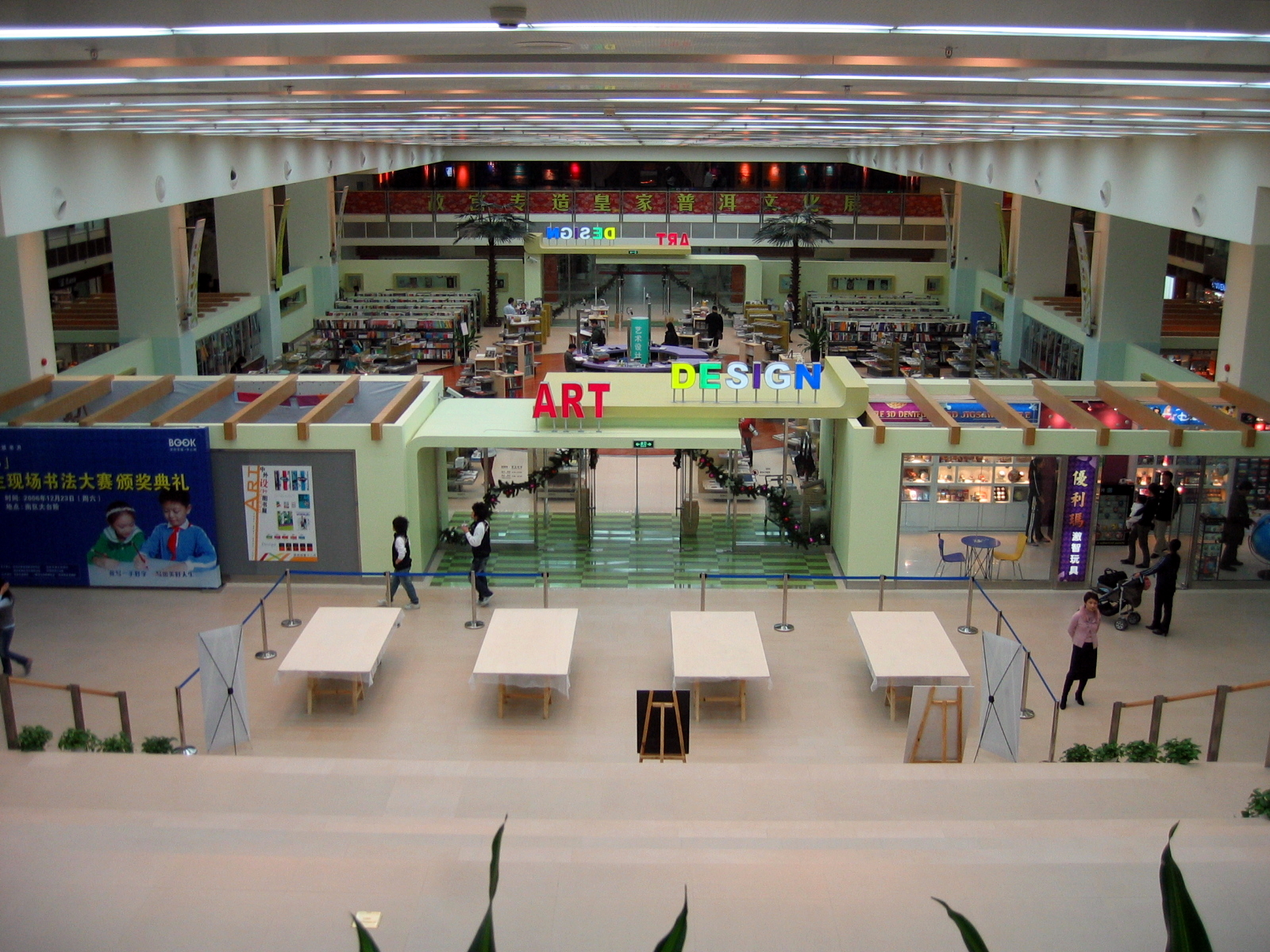
Art Design Bookstore of Shenzhen Book City (Central)

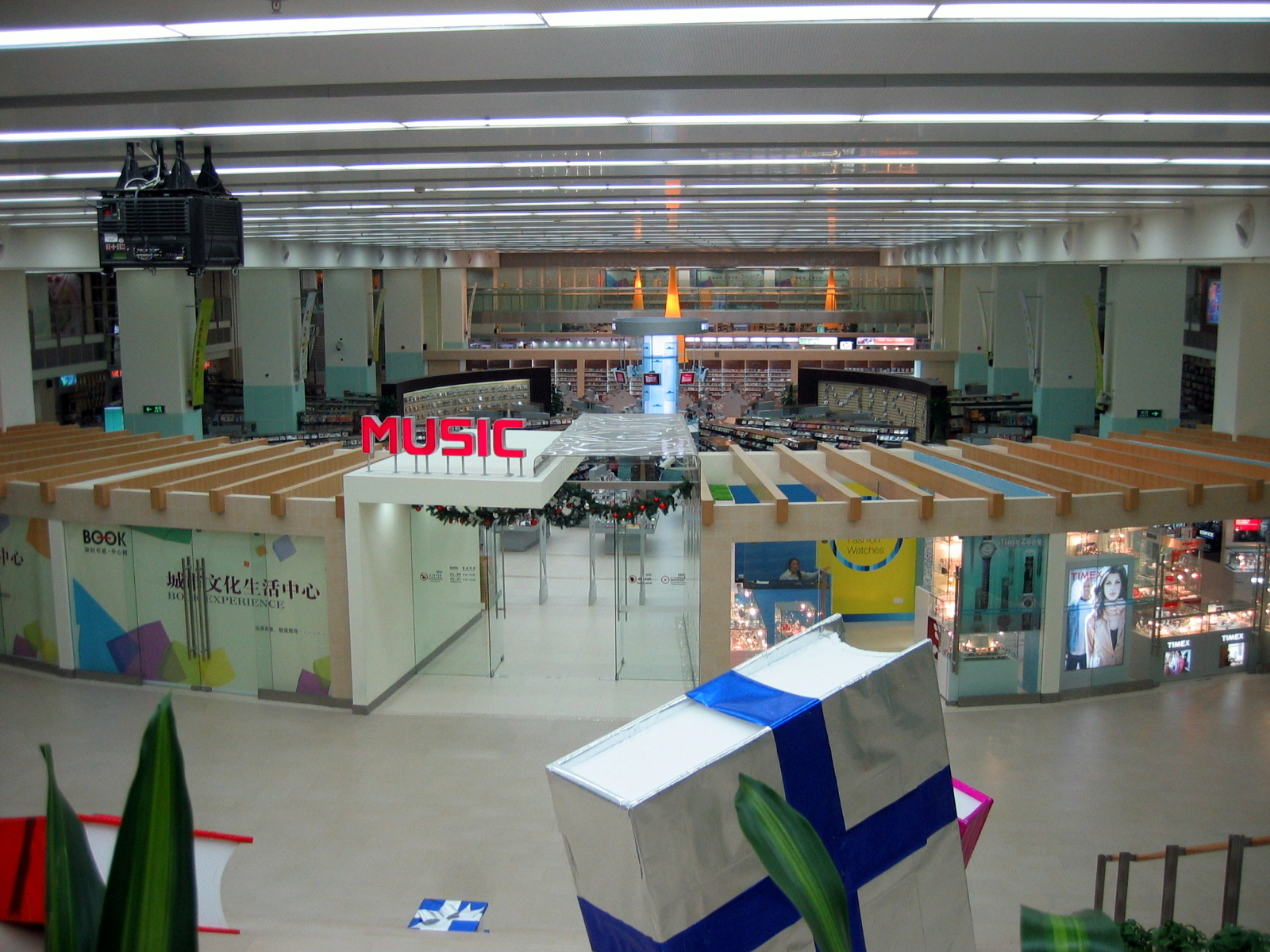
Audio and Video Store of Shenzhen Book City (Central)

Shenzhen Book City (Central) (simplified Chinese: 深圳书城中心城; traditional Chinese: 深圳書城中心城; pinyin: Shēnzhèn Shūchéng Zhōngxīnchéng), also called "Shenzhen Central Book City" or "Central Shenzhen Book Mall", is the flagship store of the "Shenzhen Book City", affiliated to Shenzhen Publishing and Distribution Group Co., Ltd. It is located in the city center of Shenzhen in China. With a business area of 42,000 square meters and over 3 million books, the store has been claimed to be the largest single-story book mall in the world. It was also the first book store in China to introduce the concept of "bookstore and shopping mall two-in-one" (BookMall), and played an important role in Shenzhen's honorary title of "Global Model City for Universal Reading" awarded by the UNESCO. In addition, story-telling competitions are held here every Sunday for children 4–8 years old.

== History ==
On July 5, 2004, the construction of the Shenzhen Central Book City started, which was officially opened on November 7, 2006.

In 2011, Irina Bokova, Director-General of UNESCO, came to Shenzhen for the first time. Although her schedule was full, she visited Shenzhen Central Book City twice, and was deeply impressed by the reading atmosphere there. In October 2013, Shenzhen was awarded the honorary title of "Global Model City for Universal Reading" by UNESCO.

In 2016, it was named one of the “Top Ten Cultural Name Cards of Shenzhen”.

Since 2015, the center has maintained the title of "National Civilized Unit" for many consecutive years, and has won other honors such as the "China Super Book City".

Since its establishment, Central Shenzhen Book Mall has received about 10 million readers every year, and an annual output value of 500 million yuan RMB. Its annual output growth rate ranks first among other large-scale book malls in China.

== Building ==
Shenzhen Central Book City is located in the city center of Shenzhen, near Shenzhen Concert Hall, Shenzhen Library and Shenzhen Children's Palace in Futian District. It covers an area of 82,000 square meters.

The book city includes three floors: the underground floor, the mezzanine and the ground floor. The underground floor is mainly a parking area with nearly 600 parking spaces. The ground floor is divided into the north and south areas, connected by a connector. On the east and west sides of the book city, are four green cultural parks of "Poetry, Books, Etiquette, and Music", each with an area of 10,000 square meters. Except the 25-meter-wide walking axis, the roof of the book city is covered with green plants on both sides. The rooftop soil layer allows lawns and trees to grow. The first floor and mezzanine have a huge longitudinal shared hall, and the roofs on both sides have vertically extending skylights. The south and north areas have two gardens, one square and one round, respectively, which are based on the meaning of "the sky is round and the earth is square", directly connected to the sky, and play the role of bringing in natural light and green plant landscapes.

== Operation ==
Shenzhen Central Book City was the first to introduce the concept of "bookstore and shopping mall two-in-one" (BookMall) in China. It has a business area of 42,000 square meters, with nearly 20,000 square meters for displaying and selling publications and cultural supplies. There are also shops for art, music, CDs and videos, and many restaurants, such as Starbucks, KFC, Ajisen Ramen, etc. Story-telling competitions are held every Sunday for children 4–8 years old.

In addition to the central bookstore, the book city also hosts the "Humanities and Social Sciences Bookstore", "Economic Management Bookstore", "Art Design Bookstore", "Life Leisure Bookstore", "Science and Technology Bookstore", "Music and Joy Time and Space Theme Store", "Youth Theme Store", "Foreign Original Bookstore", the 24-hour "Starlight Reading Stack" and other specialty stores, combining nearly 300,000 varieties of products. It also integrates catering, leisure and entertainment, creative products and cultural boutiques, providing one-stop, diversified cultural consumption choices and experiences. The book city receives nearly 10 million readers per year, with an average of more than 20,000 readers every day.

Shenzhen Book City (Central) is affiliated to Shenzhen Publishing and Distribution Group Co., Ltd., a state-owned cultural company in China.

== Honors ==
Central Shenzhen Book Mall has been entitled as

- National Civilized Unit,
- Super Book Mall in China,
- Excellent ICIF Branch Exhibition Hall (for four times).

== Other information ==
- Paper shopping bags provided by the Central City are charged.
- The ratio of male to female squatting seats in the Central City toilets is nearly 1:3, and there are special toilets for the disabled, providing sign language services.
- The background music of the Central City is carefully arranged by professionals, and varies according to the season, weather and time.
- The broadcasting service of the Central City is in Mandarin, English and Cantonese.
- Address: Fuzhong 1st Road, Futian District, Shenzheng, China; Can be reached by Metro at Longhua Line Children's Palace Station.

== See also ==
- Shenzhen Book City
- Xinhua Bookstore
