= Shenzhen Book City (Bay Area) =

Bookstore in Shenzhen, China

Shenzhen Book City (Bay Area) (simplified Chinese: 深圳书城湾区城; traditional Chinese: 深圳書城灣區城; pinyin: Shēnzhèn Shūchéng Wānqūchéng), also called the "Eyes of the Bay Area" (simplified Chinese: 湾区之眼; traditional Chinese: 灣區之眼), is the Bay Area branch store of the Shenzhen Book City group. It is located in Qianhai, Shenzhen. The construction project started in 2021 and completed in early 2025, and has won the MUSE Design Awards. The Bay Area store is the largest bookstore in China, covering a total land area of about 66,000 square meters and a construction area of about 131,000 square meters. It is expected to open for business on August 26, 2025, and will host over 1,000 cultural events and attract more than 10 million visitors annually.

== History ==
On December 18, 2021, construction of the Bay Area Book City officially started. The project covers an area of 66,000 square meters and a construction area of 131,000 square meters, with an investment of around 2.3 billion yuan RMB (US$360.87 million).

On August 22, 2024，after a public vote, the Bay Area Book City project was officially named the "Eyes of the Bay Area" because of it architectural design.

In 2024, the project won the highest honor platinum award in the architectural design category of the MUSE Design Awards and the IAA International Architecture Award. Dubbed the “Eye of the Bay Area,” the building features a double-jade plate design that blends Chinese aesthetics with Lingnan regional characteristics.

On January 22, 2025, the project passed the completion acceptance assessment.

The Bay Area Eye will open for business on August 26, 2025. It is expected to hold more than 1,000 cultural events of various types and receive more than 10 million readers annually.

== Architecture and design ==
The book store covers a land area of 65902.45 square metres and a construction area of about 131,000 square meters, making it the largest book city cultural complex in China.

The bookstore is a cultural landmark of the Bay Area. It is dubbed as the “Eye of the Bay Area” due to its double-jade plate design concept, with 2 underground floors and 2 aboveground floors.

Open and transparent architectural layout is adopted to create a diversified, interactive and immersive cultural stroll park, incorporating low-carbon principles, natural ventilation, and ecological green spaces to harmonize urban life with nature.

100,000 selected books are seamlessly integrated with a rooftop park of over 20,000 square meters and a public corridor of nearly 30,000 square meters. And there are art galleries, circular salons, interactive parks and other scenes to create a complex space where humanity and nature interact.

== Other information ==
The Bay Area Book City is located in the new city center of Qianhai, seamlessly connected to Baohua Station of Shenzhen Metro Line 5.

Currently, the "Eye of the Bay Area" has attracted more than 530 commercial brands to discuss cooperation, covering cultural performances, technological experiences, social catering, etc.

The new book store will serve as a key node in the Guangzhou-Shenzhen-Hong Kong Golden Economic Corridor, enhancing regional connectivity and cultural vitality

== See also ==
- Shenzhen Book City
- Xinhua Bookstore
