= Shenzhen Book City (Luohu) =

Bookstore in Shenzhen, China

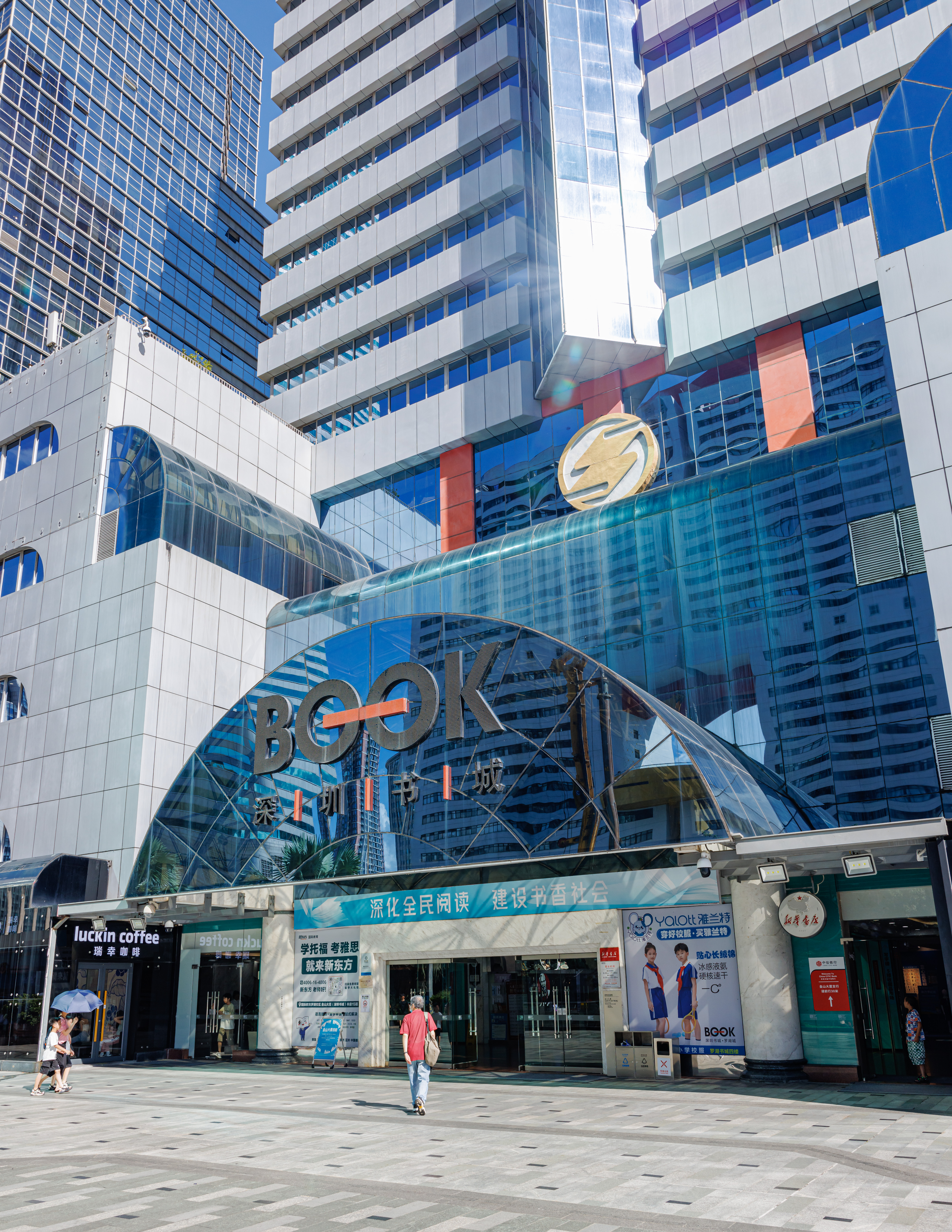
Shenzhen Book City (Luohul)

Shenzhen Book City (Luohu) (simplified Chinese: 深圳书城罗湖城; traditional Chinese: 深圳書城羅湖城; pinyin: Shēnzhèn Shūchéng Luóhúchéng), also called Shenzhen Book Mall Luohu Branch or Luohu Book Mall, is a large bookstore in Luohu District of Shenzhen. Founded in 1996 as the largest bookstore in China, the store was the first to be named "Book City", which was then followed by peers across the country.

== History ==
The construction of Shenzhen Book City at Luohu started in 1993 and was completed in October 1996. It was officially opened on November 8, 1996. At that time, the 7th National Book Fair was also held here. This book fair lasted for 11 days, with retail sales reaching 21.17 million yuan RMB and total orders exceeding 320 million yuan, creating a new historical record for the Fairs. The book display area of Shenzhen Book City reached more than 10,000 square meters, and more than 150,000 kinds of books were displayed.

On November 1, 2000, the first Shenzhen Reading Month was launched in the Shenzhen Book City Square. For more than 20 years, the book city has been an important venue for these activities.

In 2005, the Shenzhen Book City at Luohu was formerly renamed as "Shenzhen Book City (Luohu branch)" (also referred to as "Luohu Book Mall"), before the establishment of the new branch of "Shenzhen Book City (Central)".

In October 2013, UNESCO awarded Shenzhen the honorary title of "Global Model City for Universal Reading", which is inseparable from the promotion of reading by the Luohu Branch.

By the year 2015, Luohu Book City had received more than 100 million readers, held more than 5,000 events of various types, and sold more than 80 million books worth 2.1 billion yuan.

In 2018, at the 28th National Book Fair, the "Shenzhen Book City Model" of "building a city with books and building dreams with the city" became a hot topic of national attention. It also promoted the decision-making positioning of the municipal government of "One district with one book city, and one street with one book bar".

== Building ==
Luohu Book City occupies four floors in the Jinshan Building, with a business area of 13,000 square meters. The first floor is the entrance hall. The second, third and fourth floors are the main bookstores. The third floor has the "Xinxin Book Bar", and a signature area for famous authors to interact with the readers.

== Features ==
Built in 1996, Shenzhen Book City Luohu Branch was the earliest store of the present day Shenzhen Book City group. It was the first in China to be named "Book City", which was then followed by peers across the country. The original proposed name "Shenzhen Xinhua Bookstore Central Store Building" was too long. Shenzhen Book City was the largest bookstore in the country at that time.

Luohu Book Branch was the first in the country to adopt the book supermarket model with full open selection, with a business center, catering center, general service desk, postal and telecommunications agency, bank and other service facilities to provide readers with one-stop service.

Luohu Book Branch was the first to apply the self-developed BIMS information system for chain operation management. Nearly 90% of Xinhua Bookstores in China have introduced and applied this system.

Luohu Book Branch sells various books, periodicals, audio-visual products, toys, stationery, art supplies, and educational materials, electronic publications and antique collections with a capacity of more than 200,000 books. The purchase volume of books by Hong Kong readers has long accounted for more than 20% of the sales share of Shenzhen Book City.

Visitors are encouraged to sit and read freely, making it a popular spot for quiet study and leisure reading. The Tourism Bureau of Shenzhen reports that it receives more than one million readers each year.

Shenzhen Book City (Luohu) regularly hosts book launches, author talks, and educational events, contributing to Shenzhen’s reputation as a city that values learning and creativity.

== See also ==
- Shenzhen Book City
- Xinhua Bookstore
