= Xinhua Bookstore Head Office =

Chinese state bookstore

Xinhua Bookstore Head Office, or Xinhua Bookstore Headquarters (simplified Chinese: 新华书店总店; traditional Chinese: 新華書店總店; pinyin: Xīnhuá Shūdiàn Zǒngdiàn), is the central administrative hub of the Xinhua Bookstore, China's largest state-run book distribution chain. Established in a Yan'an cave in 1937 as a small bookstore, the Head Office is now a large company in Beijing, overseeing the operations, logistics, and publishing activities of Xinhua Bookstore branches across the country.

== History ==
On April 24, 1937, the "Yan'an Xinhua Bookstore" was founded in a cave dwelling in Qingliang Mountain, Yan'an. It then developed to various revolutionary base areas under the control of the Chinese Communist Party.

In 1940, Yan'an Xinhua Bookstore was renamed "Xinhua Bookstore".

In 1946, Mao Zedong wrote the name for the bookstore.

In 1948, the first batch of RMB issued by Pingshan County Bank in Hebei Province was printed by Xinhua Bookstore Printing Factory.

On January 1, 1951, the Xinhua Bookstore branches across China were unified, and Xinhua Bookstore Head Office was established based on the original Xinhua Bookstore General Administration Office. Xinhua Bookstore Head Office unified the management of Xinhua Bookstores at all levels in China.

From 1966 to 1976, Xinhua Bookstore Head Office experienced damages by the Cultural Revolution.

From 1977 to 1978, Xinhua Bookstore Head Office was reorganized and restored.

In 1987, Xinhua Bookstore Head Office merged with its subordinate units in Beijing and became a book distribution enterprise.

In 2004, the China Publishing Group Corporation was established, and Xinhua Bookstore Head Office became its affiliated unit, responsible for book distribution and wholesale for all Xinhua Bookstores and social bookstores in China.

Xinhua Bookstore Head Office's main traditional business of book wholesale ceased operations in 2008, and was then transformed to Internet technology services, cultural operations and asset management.

On April 24, 2025, Xinhua Bookstore Head Office held the "88th Anniversary Store Celebration and Readers Open Day Event" in Beijing.

== Current situation ==
The Xinhua Bookstore Head Office is located at: No.135 Beilishi Road, Beijing, China. It has more than 13,000 branch stores and annual sales of over 100 billion yuan. The Head Office has distributed more than 4.5 billion copies of books, with the list prices accounting to more than 25 billion yuan.

=== Departments ===
The Head Office consists of the following departments and offices:

- Executive office,
- Planning and finance department,
- Human resources department,
- Business development department,
- Assets managing department,
- Party and mass department,
- Department of retirement affairs,
- Information center.

=== Companies ===
The Head Office hosts the following sub-companies:

- Xinhua Internet Electronic Commerce Co., Ltd.,
- Xinhua Guocai Education Network Technology Co., Ltd.,
- Beijing Xinhua Wenbo Property Management Co., Ltd.,
- Beijing Huaxin Zhongpan Media Advertising Co., Ltd.,
- Xinhua Bookstore Chengdu Co., Ltd.

=== Newspapers and journals ===
Xinhua Bookstore Head Office publishes several newspapers and journals, including:

- New Bibliography of Social Sciences,
- New Bibliography of Science and Technology,
- China Library Weekly
- The National Catalogue of textbooks for Secondary and Higher Education.

== See also ==
- Xinhua Bookstore
