= Guangzhou Book Center =

Bookstore in Guangzhou, China

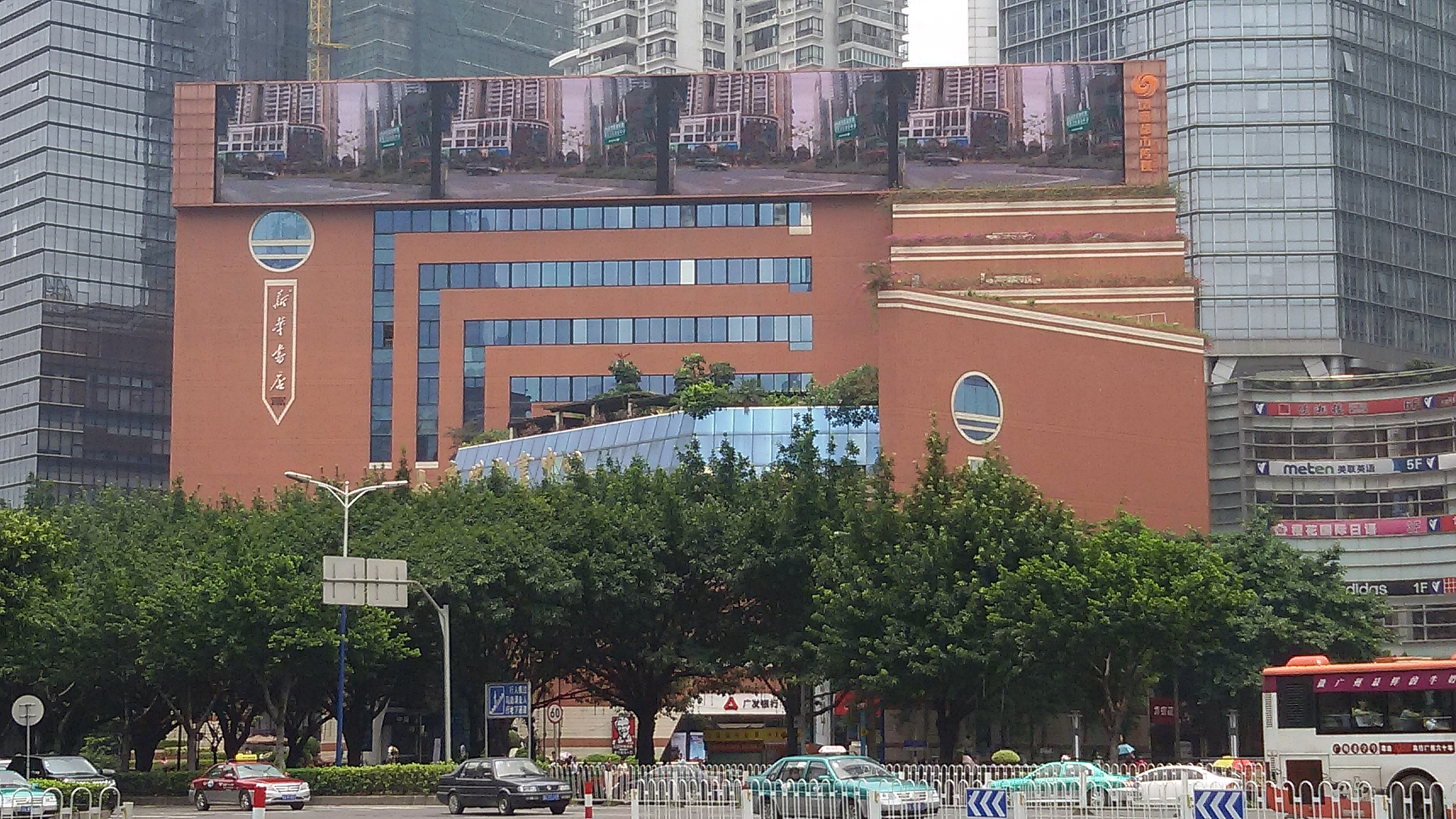
Guangzhou Book Center

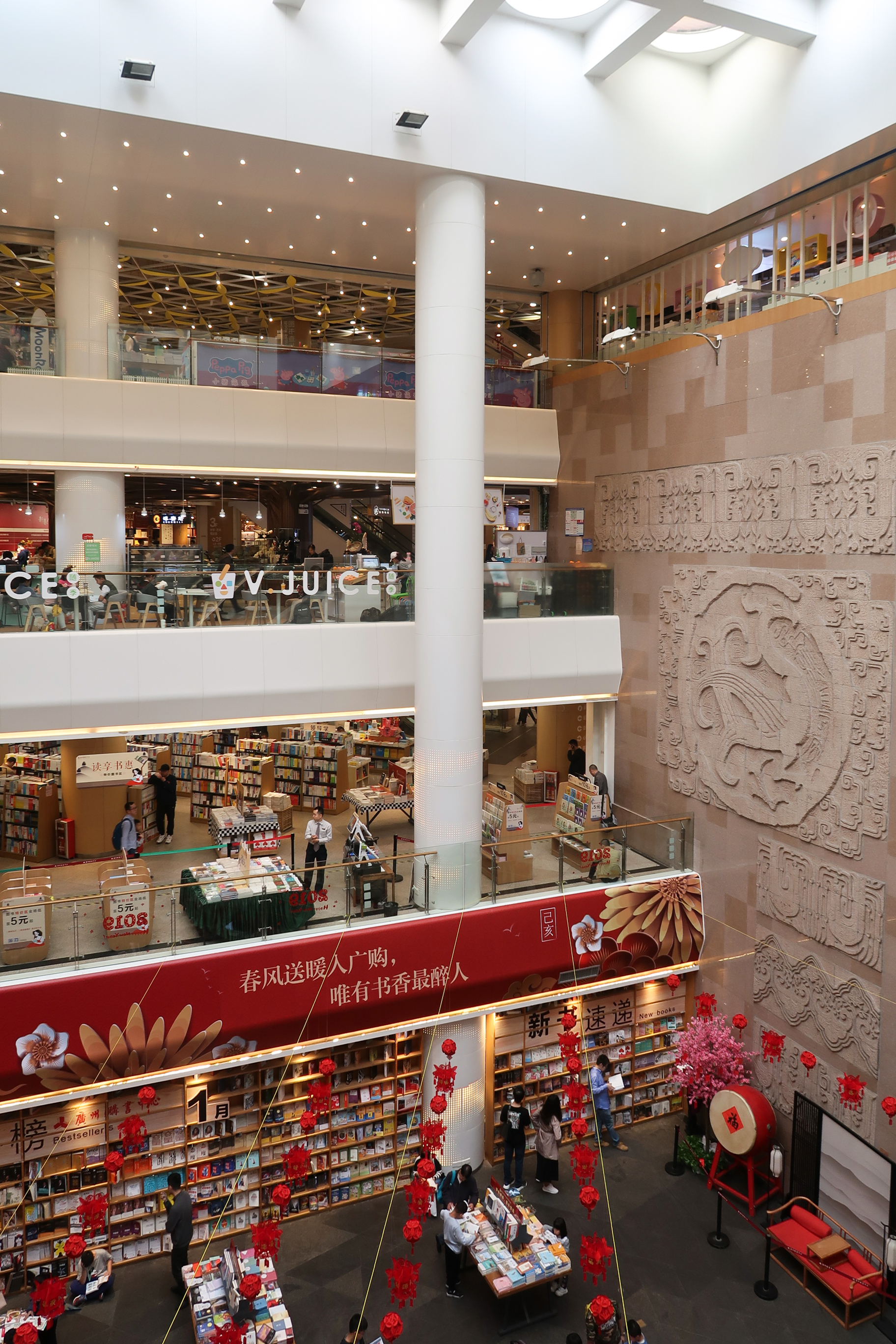
Bookstore Atrium

Guangzhou Book Center (simplified Chinese: 广州购书中心; traditional Chinese: 廣州購書中心; pinyin: Guǎngzhōu Gòushū Zhōngxīn) is a large bookstore in Guangzhou, China. When established in 1994, it was the largest bookstore in the country. The current business area of the center is 18,000 square meters, selling books, audio-visual products, electronic publications and cultural supplies.

In addition, Guangzhou Book Center has branch stores in 9 administrative districts in Guangzhou and other cities including Tianjin, Zhaoqing and Foshan.

== History ==
- On October 23, 1992, the groundbreaking ceremony for the Guangzhou Book Center civil engineering project was held on a piece of land west of Tianhe Sports Center, Guangzhou.
- On November 23, 1994, Guangzhou Book Center officially opened. It came into being with 15,000 square meters of book sales space and the capacity to display more than 100,000 types of books, and was hailed as "the largest bookstore in the world", and "No. 1 Bookstore in China". Within 12 days after opening, the book center sold more than 12 million books.
- On September 28, 2014, Guangzhou Book Center was closed for a large renovation and decoration. All floors were cleared beforehand. As a transition during the renovation period, starting from October 1, a temporary store with an area of about 6,000 square meters was opened in the southeast square of Tianhe Sports Center until the renovation was completed.

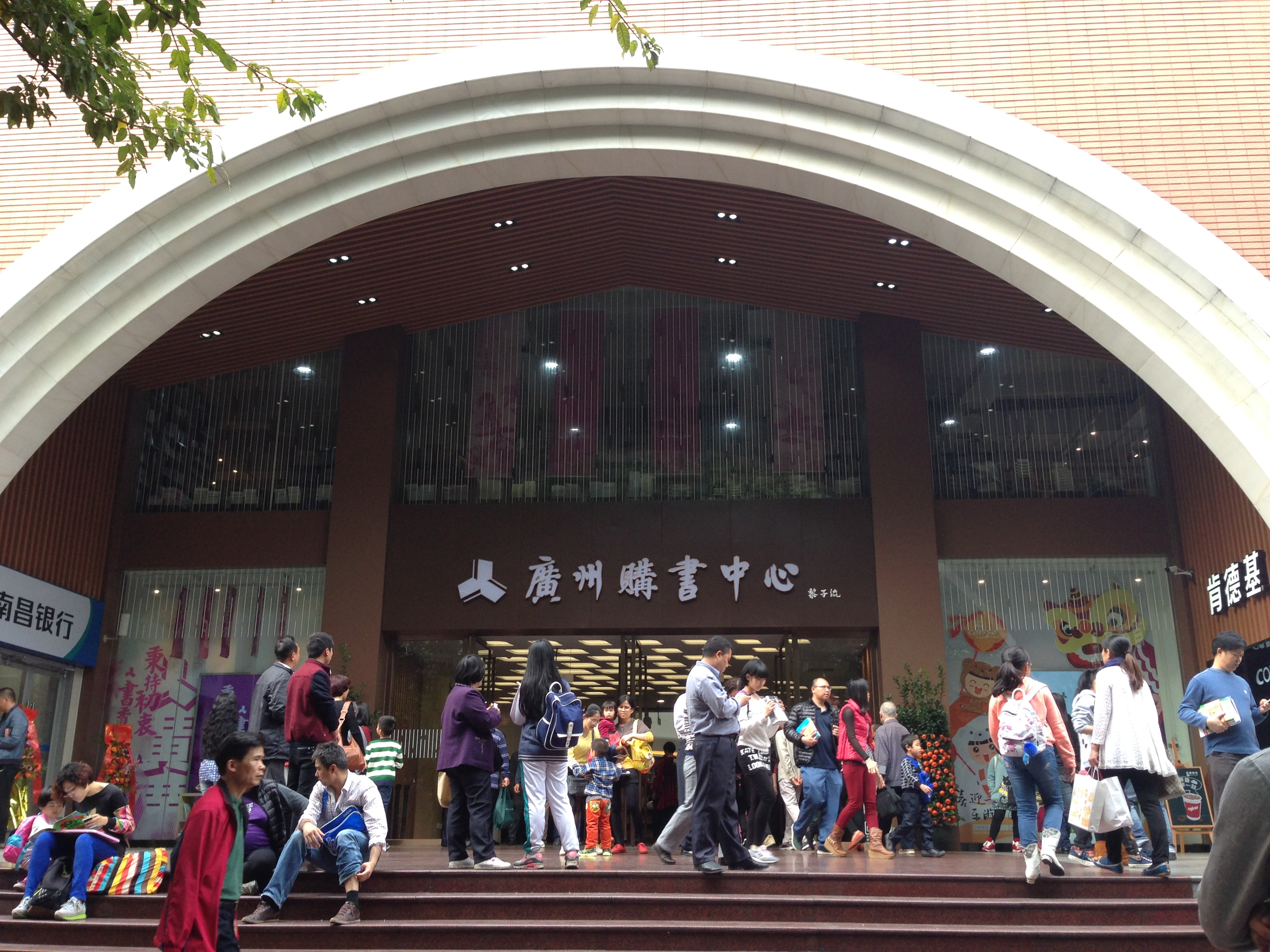
The main entrance of the Guangzhou Book Center after renovation

- On February 17, 2015, Guangzhou Book Center reopened. It was positioned as an "urban cultural life center", with a leisure area and dining area. A 300-square-meter 24-hour bookstore mainly selling foreign books was opened on the underground first floor.
- When COVID-19 broke out in 2019, Guangzhou Book Center closed. On March 30, 2020. it reopened under strict measures taken to fight against the COVID-19.
- Guangzhou Book Center was profitable for 25 years running, especially in the first eight years after its opening, with annual sales growth remained above 10%.
- On December 24, 2024, the Guangzhou Book Center was rated as a national 3A tourist attraction. In the same year, the Center merged with Guangzhou Xinhua Bookstore to form Guangzhou Xinhua Distribution Co., Ltd.

== Problems ==
=== Business type ===
Although the Guangzhou Book Center is called "Book Center", not only are there more and more cultural counters, but it also started to sell rice cookers, electric fans and other general merchandise. Some citizens worry that will destroy the atmosphere of the bookstore, turning it into a "shopping mall". The relevant person in charge of Guangzhou Book Center explained that after the transformation and upgrading, "the original business that had little to do with culture has been greatly reduced, and the current proportion of book business is higher than before." The person in charge also said that after the transformation and upgrading, Guangzhou Book Center "is to create a comprehensive cultural life center that integrates learning, leisure, entertainment, and experience."

=== Sales decline ===
In December, 2013, Chen Xuhang, office manager of Guangzhou Book Center, admitted to the reporter that the book center's sales had declined for the first time due to the competition from online business. Since the beginning of 2013, its sales had been declining, down 5% to 6% from the same period of the previous year.

=== “State-owned enterprise disease” ===
A week before Guangzhou Book Center officially closed on September 28, 2014, the center held a press conference. Some media criticized the press conference as “timely but not up to standard”, and Guangzhou Book Center repeatedly avoided reporters’ questions. When a reporter asked about the book center's operating data for the past five years, Guangzhou Book Center said: “We are not a listed company, and many accounts cannot be disclosed.” In response, the media pointed out that Guangzhou Book Center was a state-owned enterprise, and based on its public nature, the public had the right to supervise it. In recent years, Chinese government departments had introduced various policies to promote transparency in information disclosure by state-owned enterprises. Therefore, the basic operating data of state-owned bookstores that were not in sensitive industries should not be “trade secrets”.

== Other information ==
Guangzhou Book Center is now affiliated to Guangzhou Xinhua Bookstore Group Co., Ltd. The center is located at No. 123 Tianhe Road, Tianhe District, and can be reached by Public transportation: Guangzhou BRT: Sports Center Station, or Guangzhou Metro Line 1 and Line 3: Sports West Road Station.

== See also ==
- Xinhua Bookstore
