= Shenzhen Book City (Nanshan) =

Bookstore in Shenzhen, China

Shenzhen Book City (Nanshan) (simplified Chinese: 深圳书城南山城; traditional Chinese: 深圳書城南山城; pinyin: Shēnzhèn Shūchéng Nánshānchéng), also called Nanshan Book City or Nanshan Book Mall, is a branch bookstore of the Shenzhen Book City Group. It was founded in 2004 in the Nanshan District of Shenzhen, covering an area of 25,000 square meters, the largest bookstore in China in terms of business area. The store is known as "the cultural park favored by Shenzhen citizens". And the Nanshan Book City Station nearby is named after it.

== History ==
Nanshan Book City was founded on July 19, 2004, in the commercial and cultural center of Nanshan District of Shenzhen City, near Shenzhen University. It was the largest bookstore in China in terms of business area, with seven floors above ground and two floors underground, covering an area of 25,000 square meters. There were 20 theme bookstores in the book city, selling 200,000 kinds of Chinese and foreign publications and cultural and artistic products.

By 2022, the book city had served 30 million visitors, sold 27.88 million books and hosted nearly 1,000 cultural activities.

== Features ==
Nanshan Book City has a serious of distinctive brands, including “Reading for All”, “Children's Bookstore”, “Little Volunteers for Civilized Reading”, “Shenzhen University Student Culture Festival”, “Book· Happy Saloon” as well as popular science base series activities.

The book city is a building of 7 floors. It is suitable for parents to visit with their children. The 4th floor is a dedicated floor for children.

The theme of "Shenzhen Bay" specially features different local cultural products in Shenzhen, so that visitors can understand the cultural landscape of Shenzhen.

The "Comic World" in the bookstore is the largest comic theme mall in Shenzhen;

The book city also organizes book signings, lectures and exhibitions and other activities.

It is a popular science base, actively carrying out popular science reading, exhibitions, lectures and other activities.

== Contact information ==
The book city is open on: Sunday to Thursday 9: 30-21: 30; Friday, Saturday, and holidays 9: 30-22: 00; and can be reached by the following ways.

- Add: No. 2748, Nanhai Avenue, Haizhu Community, Yuehai Street, Nanshan District, Shenzhen
- Tel: 0755-86122001; 86122002; 86122020
- Subway: Line 9 Nanshan Book City Station
- Bus: 72, M562, M475 Shenzhen Book City Nanshancheng Station

== See also ==
- Shenzhen Book City
- Xinhua Bookstore
