= Shenzhen Book City =

Bookstore in Shenzhen, China

- Simplified Chinese: 深圳书城
- Traditional Chinese: 深圳書城
Transcriptions
Standard Mandarin
- Hanyu Pinyin: Shēnzhèn Shū Chéng
Yue: Cantonese
- Jyutping: sam1 zan3 syu1 sing4

Shenzhen Book City (simplified Chinese: 深圳书城; traditional Chinese: 深圳書城; pinyin: Shēnzhèn Shūchéng) is a group of large book shopping malls in Shenzhen of China. It is affiliated to the Shenzhen Publishing and Distribution Group, a wholly state-owned cultural company with independent accounting.

== Subsidiary bookstores ==
Currently, Shenzhen Book City has a total of seven branches.

- Shenzhen Book City (Luohu), located at Jinshan Building, No. 5033, Shennan East Road, Luohu District, near Shenzhen Metro Grand Theater Station, is the earliest book city to open in Shenzhen.
- Shenzhen Book City (Nanshan), located at No. 2748, Nanhai Avenue, Nanshan District.
- Shenzhen Book City (Central), located at Fuzhong 1st Road, Futian District, is the largest bookstore under Shenzhen Book City. It is also claimed to be the largest in the world. The store also includes multiple restaurants and non-book-related shops, as well as a section devoted to non-Chinese books. Overall, the store contains over 3 million books. Story-telling competitions are held every Sunday for children 4–8 years old.
- Shenzhen Book City (Baoan), located at Central Road, Shajing Street, Baoan District, near Shenzhen Metro Line 11 Shajing Station, opened on May 15, 2015. Baoan Book City has a total construction area of approximately 38,000 square meters. In addition to introducing merchants such as Huaxia Starlight Cinema and restaurants, it also introduced technologies such as mobile payment and smart positioning in the bookstore.
- Shenzhen Book City (Longgang), located in the Red Cube on the southwest side of Longcheng Plaza in Longgang District, opened on July 18, 2017, with an area of approximately 35,000 square meters.
- Shenzhen Book City (Longhua), located at No. 1389 Meilong Avenue, Longhua District, adjacent to Qinghu Station of Shenzhen Metro Line 4, has a construction area of 46,000 square meters and opened on December 31, 2019.
- Shenzhen Book City (Bay Area), which is still under construction, is located in Phases 2 and 3 of Haibin Plaza in Bao'an central district, with a total construction area of 140,000 square meters.
