= Georgi Bokov =

Georgi Bokov Георги Боков

Secretary of the Central Committee of the Bulgarian Communist Party (BCP)
- In office 1968–1976

Editor-in-chief of "Rabotnichesko Delo”
- In office 1958–1967

Personal details
- Born: 15 January 1920 Yakoruda, Bulgaria
- Died: 1 June 1989 (aged 69) Sofia, Bulgaria
- Party: Communist Party (1942–1976)
- Children: Irina Bokova, Filip Bokov

Georgi Filipov Bokov (15 January 1920 – 1 June 1989) was a member of the Bulgarian resistance movement during the Second World War. Later, he became a leading member of the Bulgarian Communist Party and editor-in-chief of Rabotnichesko Delo, the official newspaper and organ of the Bulgarian Communist Party

== Biography ==
In 1976, Georgi Bokov was removed from all his positions and retired. He was posthumously expelled from the Bulgarian Journalist Association.

== Family ==
Georgi Bokov is father of:

- Filip Bokov – Bulgarian politician.
- Irina Bokova – Politician and former Director-General of UNESCO.
