= Unite4Heritage =

- Formation: 28 March 2015
- Founder: UNESCO Director-General, Irina Bokova
- Purpose: to create a global movement to protect and safeguard heritage
- Website: twitter.com/unite4heritage/

Unite4Heritage is a campaign launched on March 28, 2015, by UNESCO Director-General, Irina Bokova, aiming to create a global movement "to protect and safeguard heritage in areas where it is threatened by extremists".

The campaign was triggered by the programmatic destruction of cultural heritage conducted in Iraq and Syria by the Islamic State of Iraq and the Levant (ISIL) since 2014, in particular after the circulation of videos of looting at Mosul Museum, destruction in the city of Nimrud and the UNESCO World Heritage site of Hatra. Irina Bokova called the destructions in Mosul a violation of the United Nations Security Council Resolution 2199, and the destruction of Nimrud a war crime.

Among the different initiatives to support Unite4Heritage, the campaign #faces4heritage can be mentioned, which invites people to change their profile on social networks to raise awareness about heritage destruction. Faces4heritage is presented on the homepage of Unite4Heritage and has become its most active supporting campaign on Twitter. #faces4heritage is run by the UNESCO chair in ICT to develop and promote sustainable tourism in World Heritage Sites, at USI - Università della Svizzera italiana (Lugano, Switzerland).

== See also ==
- Antiquities Coalition
