= China Publishing Group =

Chinese state-owned publisher

China Publishing Group Co., Ltd.
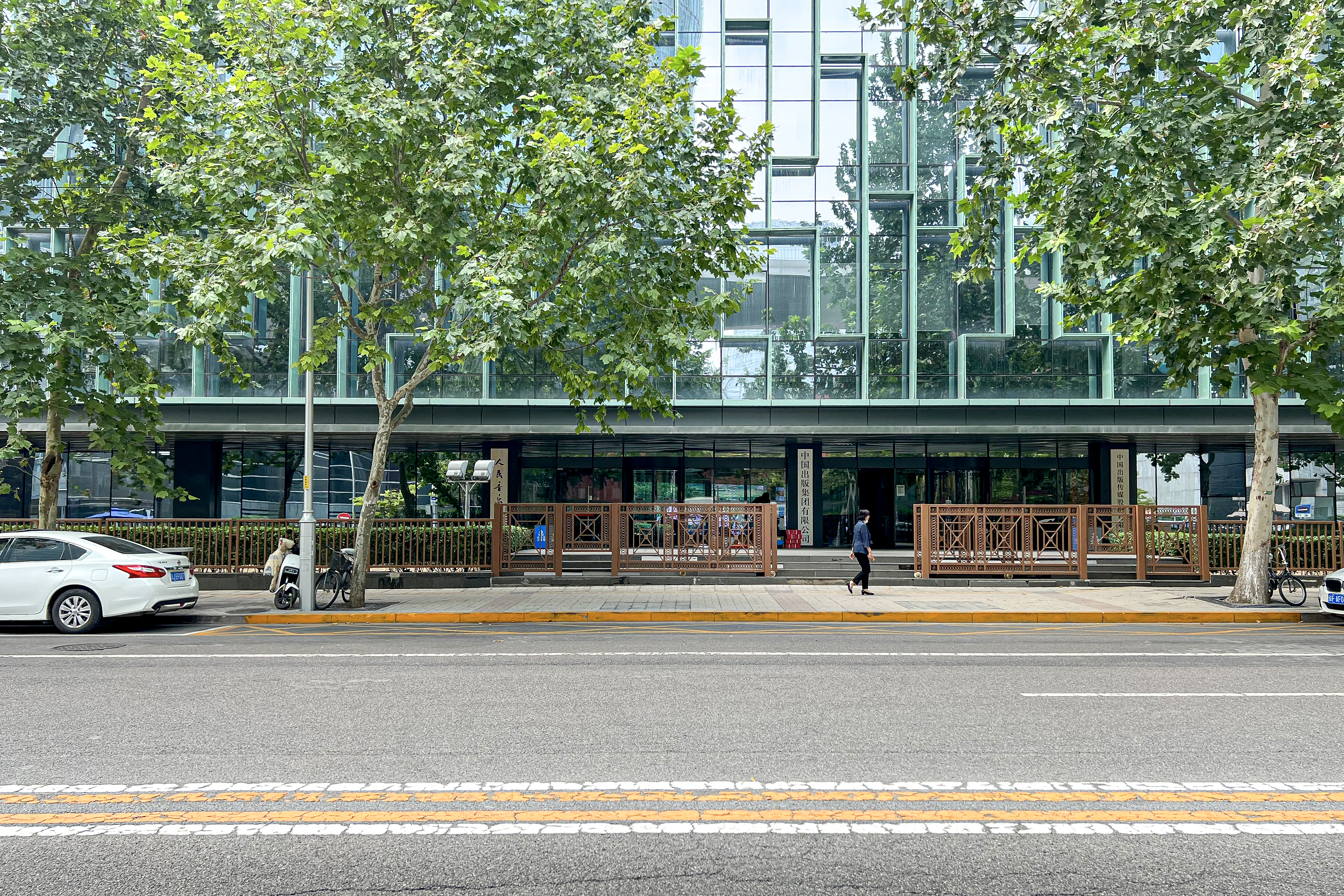
- The main entrance of China Publishing Group Co., Ltd.
- Native name: 中国出版集团
- Formerly: China Publishing Group Corporation
- Company type: Limited Liability Company (Solely State-Owned)
- Industry: News and Publishing
- Founded: April 9, 2002; 24 years ago
- Headquarters: No. 55 Chaoyangmennei Street, Dongcheng District, Beijing, China
- Key people: Chairman: Huang Zhijian; General Manager: Chang Bo
- Subsidiaries: Sanlian Bookstore; The Commercial Press; Zhonghua Book Company...
- Website: www.cnpubg.com

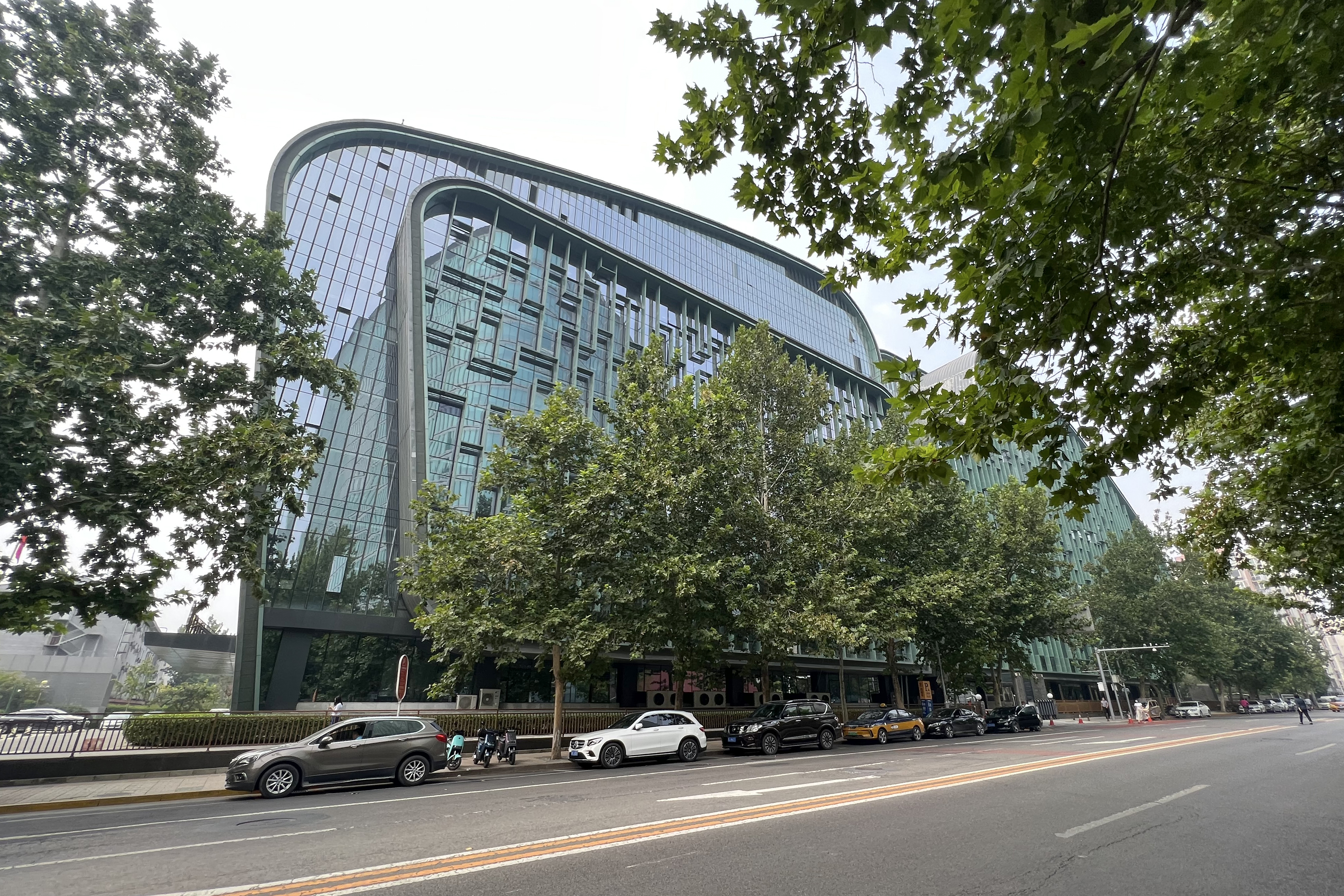
China Publishing Group's Press and Publication Building

China Publishing Group (CPG) is a state publishing house in China. Established in 2002, CPG now has 40 publishing institutions under its jurisdiction, including Commercial Press, Zhonghua Book Company and Encyclopedia of China Publishing House. CPG annually produce over 20,000 titles of books, audio-visual publications, electronic and online publications, as well as more than 50 newspapers and magazines.

== History ==
The predecessors of CPG include the oldest and the most prestigious publishing houses in China, such as the Commercial Press, established 125 years ago; Zhonghua Book Publishing Company, with a history of 110 years; Sanlian Publishing Company, founded 90 years ago; as well as Rongbaozhai, a well-known art gallery whose history dates back to the 1700s.

On April 9, 2002, with the approval of the State Council of the People's Republic of China, the state-owned enterprises including the above-mentioned predecessors were integrated to form the "China Publishing Group", a national publishing institution.

On March 25, 2004, China Publishing Group was transformed into "China Publishing Group Corporation" and acquire the rights of investors of the member units of the original China Publishing Group.

On December 28, 2011, "China Publishing and Media Co., Ltd." was established. On August 21, 2017, China Publishing and Media Co., Ltd. was listed on the Shanghai Stock Exchange. (SSE: 601949)

In 2018, with the approval of the Ministry of Finance, the company was restructured into "China Publishing Group Co., Ltd."

== Current situation ==
China Publishing Group is the largest publishing group in China. It has 40 publishing institutions, with an annual output of over 20,000 titles of books, as well as more than 50 newspapers and magazines. And there are more than 2000 titles of foreign rights transactions every year.

China National Publications Import and Export (Group) Co., Ltd., one of the subsidiaries of CPG, handles over 62% import and 30% export of China book trading. CPG also owns 17 overseas publishing houses, bookstores and offices, in more than 130 countries and regions.

== Organization ==
China Publishing Group's directly affiliated companies include:

- People's Literature Publishing House
- Commercial Press
- Zhonghua Book Company
- Encyclopedia of China Publishing House
- China Fine Arts Publishing House
- People's Music Publishing House
- Life·Reading·New Knowledge Sanlian Bookstore
- China Translation and Publishing House Co., Ltd.
- Oriental Publishing Center
- Modern Education Press
- China Publishing and Media Business Daily
- China Democracy and Legal System Publishing House
- Huawen Publishing House
- World Book Publishing Company
- Modern Publishing House
- Beijing Sino-Singapore Technology Co., Ltd.
- Beijing Sino-Singapore Printing Materials Co., Ltd.
- China Publishing Group Digital Media Co., Ltd.
- China Publishing Textbook Co., Ltd.
- Xinhua United Distribution Co., Ltd.
- China Publishing International Media Co., Ltd.
- China Publishing Culture Communication Co., Ltd.
- China Publishing Kunlun Media Company
- Xinhua Bookstore Head Office
- China National Publications Import & Export Corporation
- Rongbaozhai Publishing House
- China Translation Co., Ltd.
- Zhongban Digital Equipment Co., Ltd.
- Beijing Zhongban Real Estate Co., Ltd.
- Zhongban (Beijing) Science and Technology Trade Co., Ltd.

== Honours ==
China Publishing Group has been on the lists of "Top 30 Chinese Cultural Enterprises" since 2008, on the “Top 50 Global Publishers” for four years in a row, and on the list of “Top 500 Brands in Asia” four times.

== See also ==
- Publishing industry in China
