= Rabotnichesko delo =

Defunct Bulgarian newspaper

Rabotnichesko delo Работническо дело

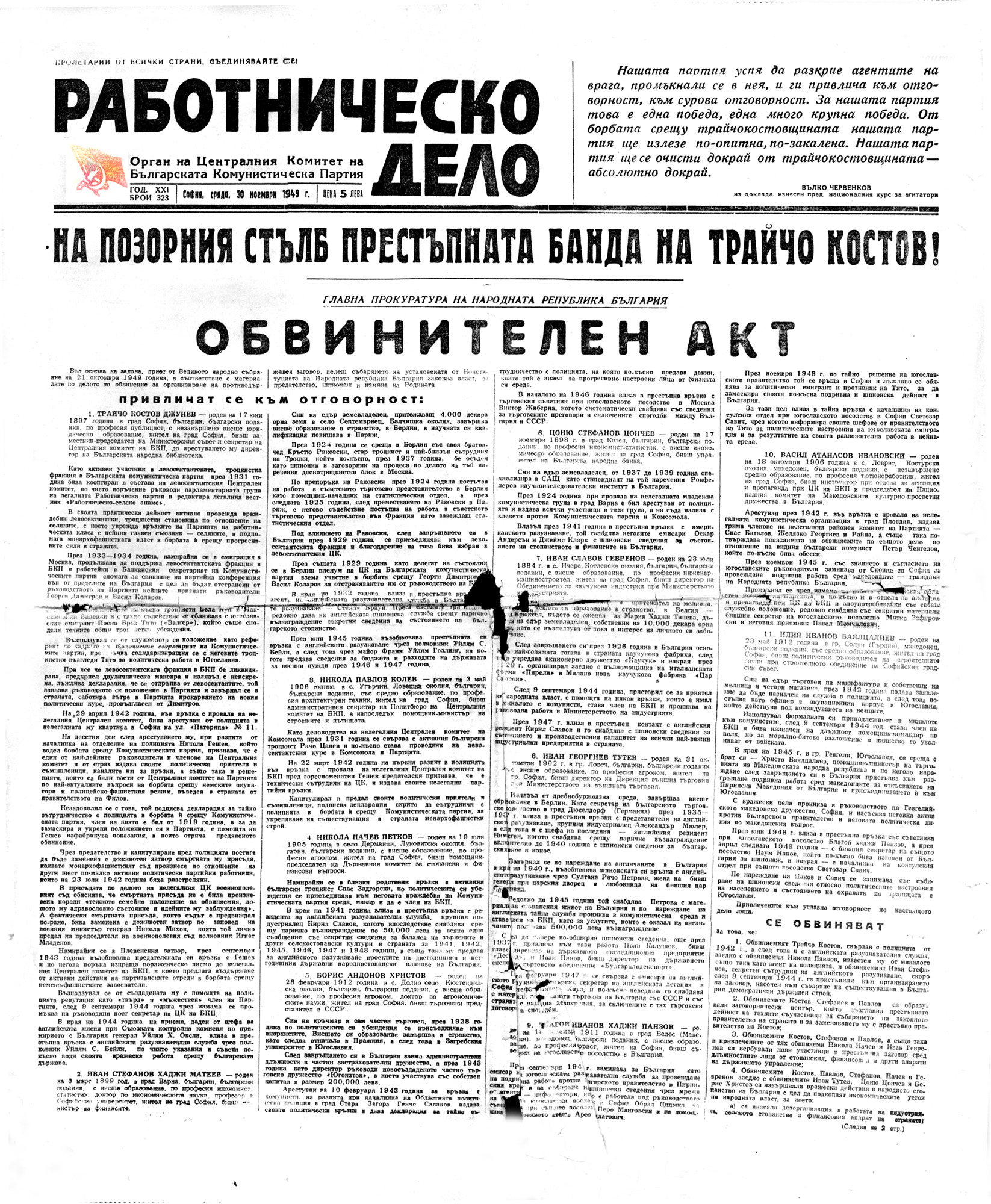
- The indictment against the group of Traicho Kostov, 30 November 1949
- Type: Daily newspaper
- Format: A2
- Publisher: CC of the BCP
- Editor: Radoslav Radev (last)
- Founded: 5 March 1927
- Ceased publication: 1990
- Political alignment: Communist
- Language: Bulgarian
- Headquarters: Sofia
- City: Sofia
- Country: Bulgaria
- Circulation: 750 000 (as of 1974)

Rabotnichesko delo (Bulgarian: Работническо дело, "Worker's Cause") was a Bulgarian daily newspaper that was the media organ of the Bulgarian Communist Party's Central Committee and was one of the People's Republic of Bulgaria's highest-circulation newspapers. The newspaper was established in 1927 and was issued from Sofia. The first newspaper was released on 5 March 1927. The paper was renamed to Duma, (Bulgarian: Дума), "Word", in 1990. Duma, despite some financial troubles, is still issued today.

Rabotnichesko delo was initially the weekly of the Bulgarian Workers' Party. Although it was banned following the Bulgarian coup d'état of 1934, it was nevertheless published illegally until 1944. In 1938, it merged with Rabotnicheski vestnik ("Worker's Newspaper"), the Bulgarian Communist Party's newspaper, founded in 1897. Rabotnichesko delo criticized the bourgeois government, propagated the ideas of communism and was against the country's participation in World War as part of the Axis powers, advocating closer ties with the Soviet Union instead.

After the Bulgarian coup d'état of 1944, the newspaper was elevated to become the ruling party's main mouthpiece and propaganda tool. It was closed following the fall of the People's Republic of Bulgaria and the dissolution of the Bulgarian Communist Party in 1990.

== Editors in-chief ==
- Krum Kyulyavkov (September 17 – October 18, 1944)
- Dimitar Ganev (1944–1945)
- Vladimir Poptomov (1945–1949)
- Atanas Stoykov (1950–1953)
- Dimitar Deliiski (1953–1954)
- Encho Staykov (1954–1956)
- Georgi Bokov (1958–1976)
- Petar Dyulgerov (1976–1977)
- Yordan Yotov (1977–1987)
- Radoslav Radev (1987–1990)
