= Irina Bokova =

Bulgarian diplomat (born 1952)

- Ирина Бокова
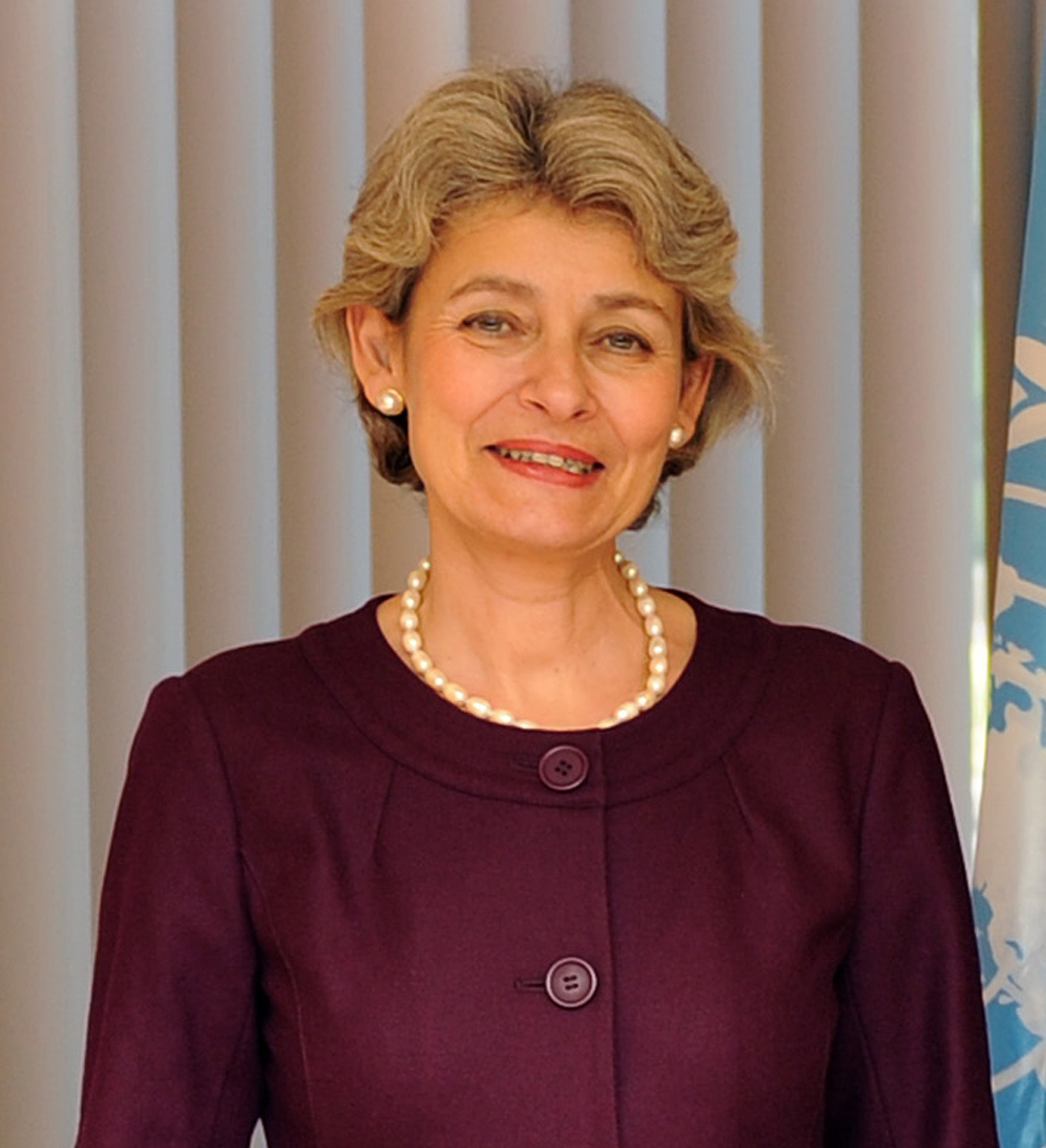
- Bokova in 2009

9th Director-General of UNESCO
- In office 15 October 2009 – 10 November 2017
- Deputy: Getachew Engida
- Preceded by: Kōichirō Matsuura
- Succeeded by: Audrey Azoulay

Minister of Foreign Affairs Acting
- In office 13 November 1996 – 13 February 1997
- Prime Minister: Zhan Videnov
- Preceded by: Georgi Pirinski
- Succeeded by: Stoyan Stalev

Personal details
- Born: 12 July 1952 (age 74) Sofia, People's Republic of Bulgaria
- Spouse: Kalin Mitrev
- Education: Moscow State Institute of International Relations
- Website: Official biography

Irina Georgieva Bokova (Bulgarian: Ирина Георгиева Бокова; born 12 July 1952) is a Bulgarian politician and a former Director-General of UNESCO (2009–2017). During her political and diplomatic career in Bulgaria, she served, among others, two terms as a member of the National parliament, and deputy minister of foreign affairs and minister of foreign affairs ad interim under Prime Minister Zhan Videnov. She also served as Bulgaria's ambassador to France and to Monaco, and was Bulgaria's Permanent Delegate to UNESCO. Bokova was also the personal representative of Bulgaria's president to the Organisation internationale de la Francophonie (2005–2009).

On 15 November 2009, she took office as the ninth Director-General of UNESCO, marking two firsts: she became both the first female and the first Southeastern European to head the agency. At UNESCO, Bokova advocated for gender equality, improved education and preventing funding for terrorism, especially by enforcing the protection of intellectual goods. Currently, she is co-founder and member of GWL Voices.

== Childhood and early years ==
Irina Bokova is the daughter of the communist politician Georgi Bokov, editor-in-chief of Rabotnichesko Delo, the official newspaper and organ of the Bulgarian Communist Party. By descent Bokova is Bulgarian. Bokova graduated from the First English Language School, and then went on to graduate from the Moscow State Institute of International Relations, preparing young apparatchiks from the entire Eastern Bloc for future tasks such as diplomats and agents under the control of the KGB. Subsequently, she worked at the Ministry of Foreign Affairs of Bulgaria, starting in 1977 as a third secretary and eventually becoming acting minister (ad interim) between 13 November 1996 – 13 February 1997. In 2015 German newspaper Die Welt discovered an error on her UNESCO biography page, where she was named the minister, and not the ad interim. When it came to public attention, the error was immediately removed.

Bokova was a member of the Bulgarian communist party until 1990, when the party was renamed in Bulgarian Socialist Party, and her membership was cancelled, after changes in the law that year required that employees of several ministries, among them Foreign Affairs, should not be members of any political party. Bokova was two terms member of the Bulgarian Parliament – the first term in 1990-1991 during the 7th Grand (Constitutional) National Assembly, elected as a majoritarian representative with the Bulgarian Socialist Party list, and the second, during the 39th National Assembly, in 2001–2005, with the Coalition for Bulgaria list.

== Personal ==
In addition to her mother tongue Bulgarian, she speaks English, French, Spanish and Russian. She is married to Kalin Mitrev, a director at EBRD, and has two children.

== Education ==
- 1971: First English Language School, Sofia.
- 1976: Moscow State Institute of International Relations, MSc in international relations.
- 1989, January – August: University of Maryland, School of Public Affairs, Washington, D.C., Program on US foreign policy decision-making process.
- 1992–1994: NATO fellow, Program for Central and Eastern Europe on democratic institutions focusing on the national and legal mechanism for the protection of minorities.
- 1999, November – December: Harvard University, John F. Kennedy School of Government, Executive Program in Leadership and Economic Development.

== Career ==
Irina Bokova interview on Palmyra, 25 May 2015

=== Current positions ===
- Former Director-General of the United Nations Educational, Scientific and Cultural Organization (UNESCO)
- Ambassador Extraordinary and Plenipotentiary of the Republic of Bulgaria to France.
- Ambassador Extraordinary and Plenipotentiary of the Republic of Bulgaria to the Principality of Monaco.
- Permanent Delegate of the Republic of Bulgaria to UNESCO.
- Representative of the Bulgarian Government to the executive board of UNESCO (since the election of Bulgaria in October 2007).
- Personal Representative of the President of the Republic of Bulgaria to Organisation Internationale de la Francophonie (OIF).
- Deputy Chairperson, Group of Francophone Countries at UNESCO.
- Chairperson of the Second Extraordinary Session of the Intergovernmental Committee for the Safeguarding of the Intangible Cultural Heritage (February 2008, Sofia).
- Member of the Literary group Prix des Ambassadeur.
- In November 2021, Bokova was elected as a Fellow of the World Academy of Art and Science, an international organization consisting of scientists, scholars, and artists that addresses global challenges.

=== Parliamentary experience ===
- Deputy Chairperson of the Foreign Policy, Defense and Security Committee.
- Member of the European Integration Committee.
- Deputy Chairperson of the Joint Parliamentary Committee Bulgaria – European Union.

=== Civil society experience ===
- Founder and Chairperson of the European Policy Forum (since its inception in Sofia in 1997), a non-profit, non-governmental organization.
- Patron of the Asian University for Women (AUW) in Chittagong, Bangladesh. The university, which is the product of east–west foundational partnerships (Bill and Melinda Gates Foundation, Open Society Foundation, IKEA Foundation, etc.) and regional cooperation, serves extraordinarily talented women from 15 countries across Asia and the Middle East.

=== Ministry of Foreign Affairs ===
- 2005–2009: Ambassador of Bulgaria to France and Monaco
- 2005–2009: Ambassador of Bulgaria to UNESCO
- November 1996 – February 1997: acting at the ministry of foreign affairs (ad interim)
- June 1995 – February 1997, other positions held in the cabinet of Zhan Videnov, Bulgarian Socialist Party:
- First Deputy Minister for Foreign Affairs in charge of UN, OSCE, EU and NATO.
- Chief co-ordinator of Bulgaria–EU relations.
- Co-chairperson, Bulgaria – EU Association Committee.
- National PHARE Co-ordinator.
- Chairperson, Inter-Agency Co-ordination Commission on European Integration (at deputy ministerial level).
- Took part as head of delegation or keynote speaker in a number of international fora.
- Member of the Board of Trustees of the Centre for European Studies.
- 1984–1990: second and first secretary, Department UN and Disarmament
- 1982–1984: third secretary, Permanent Mission of Bulgaria to the UN
- 1977–1982: intern and third secretary, Department UN and Disarmament

=== UNESCO ===
On 22 September 2009, Bokova was elected Director-General of UNESCO. She defeated nine candidates at the election in Paris, with Farouk Hosny ultimately being defeated by 31–27 in the fifth and last round of voting. Hosny had been expected to win but attracted criticism from figures such as Nobel Peace laureate Elie Wiesel over his anti-Israel statements. She took over the position from Koïchiro Matsuura of Japan. She entered the office of the Director-General as both the first woman, and the first Southeastern European to take this role. On 15 October 2009, the 35th session of the General Conference elected Irina Bokova of Bulgaria as the tenth Director-General of UNESCO. The investiture took place in a ceremony in Room I in the afternoon of Friday 23 October 2009.

On 4 October 2013, the executive board of UNESCO nominated her for second term as Director-General. She was re-elected by the UNESCO General Conference on 12 November 2013.

In 2009, while most of the Bulgarian media was supportive of Ms. Bokova's future role at the helm of UNESCO, some raised questions about her past as a daughter of a member of the totalitarian communist elite. Bulgarian-born German writer Iliya Troyanov criticised Bokova's election as Director-General of UNESCO in the Frankfurter Allgemeine Zeitung, calling it "a scandal", in light of Bokova's father's communist past. On the other hand, The New York Times not only published an article, explaining who Mrs. Bokova is, but also officially supported her nomination on the grounds that "[s]he played an active role in Bulgaria's political transformation from Soviet satellite to European Union member. That should be a strong asset in leading an organization badly buffeted in the past by ideological storms."

On 16 January 2014, Irina Bokova yielded to pressure from the Arab League and postponed for five months an exhibit entitled The People, the Book, the Land – 3,500 years of ties between the Jewish people and the Land of Israel, following protest from the Arab states in UNESCO, arguing it would harm the peace process. Invitations had already gone out and the exhibit was scheduled to run from 21 January through 30 January at UNESCO's Paris headquarters with fully prepared exhibition material already in place. In a letter to Bokova, Abdulla al Neaimi, an official from the United Arab Emirates, expressed "deep worry and great disapproval" over the program showing the age old connection between Israel and the Jewish people. The US State Department said it was outraged at the move, "UNESCO's decision is wrong and should be reversed." Canada's Department of Foreign Affairs said "is no appropriate rationale to delay the exhibition and deeply disappointed by the decision made to postpone it". The Wiesenthal Center called the move an "Absolute outrage, the Arabs don't want the world to know that the Jews have a 3,500-year relationship to the Land of Israel". The exhibition was opened on 11 June 2014 in Paris, in a ceremony with participation by Mrs. Bokova and the Dean of the Simon Wiesenthal Center, Rabbi Marvin Hier. The exhibit was co-sponsored by Israel, Canada, and Montenegro, and was called "a breakthrough" by its author, professor Robert Wistrich. On 18 November 2015 Irina Bokova was given the Special Award of the Simon Wiesenthal Center at a ceremony in Washington, D.C., for the inauguration of the exhibition People, Book, Land: The 3,500 year Relationship of the Jewish People with the Holy Land in the U.S. capital. Bokova inaugurated the exhibition in the presence of Edward Royce, Chairman of the House Foreign Affairs Committee, Eliot Engel, Ranking Member of the House Foreign Affairs Committee, Israel's Ambassador to the United States Ron Dermer and Rabbi Marvin Hier.

On 28 March 2015, she launched Unite4Heritage, a campaign aiming to create a global movement "to protect and safeguard heritage in areas where it is threatened by extremists". The campaign was triggered by the programmatic destruction of cultural heritage conducted in Iraq and Syria by the Islamic State of Iraq and the Levant (ISIL) since 2014, in particular after the circulation of videos of looting at Mosul Museum, destruction in the city of Nimrud and the UNESCO World Heritage site of Hatra.

As Director-General of UNESCO, Bokova led efforts to block the trade in Syrian and Iraqi cultural artifacts to fund ISIS and other radical Islamist groups. These efforts led to the adoption of United Nations Security Council Resolution 2199 on 12 February 2015. This resolution officially recognized the link between illicit traffic and security, outlawed all trade in cultural goods from Iraq and Syria and requested that UNESCO coordinate efforts in this area with Interpol. In response to the threat to Iraq's antiquities from increased violence and instability, Bokova implemented an emergency plan to safeguard artifacts of Iraq's cultural heritage.

On 19 October 2015, German DW reported that Japan threatens to halt funding for UNESCO over the organization's decision to include documents relating to the 1937 Nanjing Massacre in the latest listing for its "Memory of the World" program. While the decision is not of the Director-General, a Japanese professor claimed that Mrs. Bokova might have interest in courting China. In October 2016, after opposing an Arab-backed resolution in UNESCO denying Temple Mount's connection to Judaism, Bokova received death threats, prompting her protection to be reinforced.

=== Post-UNESCO work ===
In 2018 it was announced that Irina Bokova will be teaching at the Kyung Hee University in Korea. Kyung Hee University also awarded Bokova an honorary doctorate in Peace Studies, and she assumed the Miwon Professorship and the office of the honorary rector of the Humanitas College.

In 2020 she was selected as an International Honorary Member of the American Academy of Arts and Sciences in Class V — Public Affairs, Business, and Administration, section Scientific, Cultural, and Nonprofit Leadership.

== United Nations Secretary-General Candidacy ==
Between mid-2014 and end-2016, Bokova was a candidate for the position of UN Secretary General.

In June 2014 the Bulgarian government nominated Irina Bokova to be the official candidate of the country for the United Nations top job.

In January 2015 the new Bulgarian government confirmed the candidacy, although the now-ruling conservative GERB was much less enthusiastic about Bokova than the former Socialist Party government that originally nominated her. That same month former Polish President Aleksander Kwasniewski wrote in an article at the Wall Street Journal, that her work at UNESCO is "highly regarded", and that the Bulgarian government has "nominated her to succeed Ban Ki-moon as the next U.N. Secretary-General, and she is widely believed to be the frontrunner for that position".

Responding to a Parliamentary question, on 18 May 2015 the Bulgarian foreign minister Daniel Mitov explained the process, undertaken by the Bulgarian Ministry of Foreign Affairs, to support Irina Bokova's candidacy. He informed the Bulgarian Parliament that the campaign consists of three stages – information-consultative one – until September 2015, the essential stage – between September 2015 and April 2016, and the last stage – from May 2016 until October–December 2016.

On 9 February 2016 the Bulgarian Foreign Ministry announced that her candidacy for the top UN job has been officially submitted to the United Nations for consideration. On 11 February Bulgarian media reported that the Foreign Ministry has allocated BGN 106,300 (approx. $60,000 at the time of the publication) for the election campaign.

Her campaign ran into troubles after reports that the United Kingdom had opposed her elevation. According to the Government of Russia, Germany began to organize to nominate another Bulgarian – European commissioner Kristalina Georgieva – as candidate to become Secretary General. It was alleged that German chancellor Angela Merkel put pressure on the government of Bulgaria to abandon Bokova's candidacy and instead nominate Georgieva, and had sought Russian support for this move. Germany categorically denied the allegation.

After five informal polls at the UN Security Council, in which Bokova took between third and sixth place, on 28 September 2016, the Bulgarian government announced that it was nominating Kristalina Georgieva as secretary-general candidate. Since the rules for nominating UN Secretary-General do not provide the option of replacing a candidate, unless they agreed to stand down, which Irina Bokova said she would not do, from 28 September 2016 there were two Bulgarian candidates, with Kristalina Georgieva being the "sole and unique candidate of Bulgaria".

=== Statements and positions ===
As a candidate to replace Ban Ki-moon, Bokova participated in informal dialogues at the UN and other conferences to defend her positions and explain her candidature. When prompted by St. Vincent and the Grenadines and an informal dialogue at the UN, Bokova responded by emphasizing her understanding of the problem as she had recently traveled to Haiti, and her acknowledgement of the various UN agencies that have make substantial efforts to cope with this issue.

In response to a plenary question on the UN's role in regards to cholera in Haiti at the International Peace Institute, Bokova responded, "Of course I know about this problem and I know that there is a legal process that is being engaged in currently. I do not know the details of this legal process, I just know that it is going there and I know that there is an idea to establish a fund for indemnities. I will be advocating also for this action to be taken."

On sexual exploitation and abuse by UN peacekeepers, Bokova made this issue central to her vision statement. "I am determined to work with governments and the civil society to combat any kind of violence against women and girls... There can be no excuse for the appalling crimes of sexual violence and I consider that the UN has to take the lead in showing strong commitment to ending impunity for violence against women and girls."

On jihadism, she said she would try to get the UN to do more to curb the threat of Isis, saying cultural dialogue and education were key to curbing jihadism which is "one of the threats to peace, one of the threats to societies," adding that "Isis/Daesh is about the destruction of societies. They pit communities against one another".

=== Endorsements ===
Bokova's candidacy collected a number of endorsements. In July 2015 The Guardian published an article, titled Will the next UN secretary general be a woman? with a picture of Irina Bokova and a description The head of Unesco, Irina Bokova from Bulgaria, is a favourite to become the UN's new secretary general in 2017.

Bulgarian weekly Capital wrote a page about her candidacy, which states, among other,

Bokova demonstrates diplomatic and governance skills in a big international organization – UNESCO, which she heads for a second term. She has good reputation to the permanent five members of the UN Security Council. She speaks fluently English, French, Spanish and Russian – four of the six official UN languages (the requirement is for two). She has a clear vision about the mission and activity of the organization.

In July 2015 EurActiv published an article by former Irish Minister for European Affairs and Minister for the Environment Dick Roche, titled The next UN Secretary-General? Bokova ticks all the boxes, arguing in favor of Irina Bokova's candidacy.

On 29 September 2015, David Clark, chairman of the Russia Foundation, published an article in the Financial Times' beyondbrics forum. In it the author comments: "Of the women from Eastern Europe being discussed is Irina Bokova, the current head of UNESCO and former Bulgarian foreign minister. She is considered to be a front-runner."

On 2 October 2015, governor Bill Richardson wrote an opinion for The Washington Post, "The next U.N. secretary general should be a woman". There he describes women, who are considered as potential candidates. About Bokova, he writes, "several leading candidates are beginning to emerge. Irina Bokova, director general of UNESCO and Bulgaria's official candidate, fulfills many of the required criteria and is seen by many as the front-runner. She has taken a strong stance on the fight against extremism and terror financing and is actively championing women empowerment and girls' education."

On 4 July 2016 the French newspaper L'Opinion published an open letter in support of Irina Bokova's candidacy. The letter was signed by a number of prominent French, among them Christine Albanel, Yann Arthus-Bertrand, Pierre Bergé, Hélène Carrère d'Encausse, Jean-Pierre Chevènement, Yves Coppens, Édith Cresson, Xavier Darcos, Pierre Gattaz, Jean-Michel Jarre, Bariza Khiari, Beate Klarsfeld, Serge Klarsfeld, Julia Kristeva, Catherine Lalumière, Laurence Parisot, Stéphane Richard, Eric de Rothschild. They urged the French President and the French government to support the nomination of Bokova, as this is in the interests of France, and also to promote their position to the other members of the UN Security Council and the UN General Assembly.

== Awards and decorations ==
Award or decoration	Date	Place
Doctor honoris causa of Ewha Womans University	May 2010	Seoul, Korea
Doctor honoris causa of Moscow State Institute of International Relations	September 2010	Moscow, Russian Federation
Doctor honoris causa of Università Cattolica del Sacro Cuore	October 2010	Milan, Italy
Doctor honoris causa of St. Cyril and St. Methodius University of Veliko Tarnovo	October 2010	Veliko Tarnovo, Bulgaria
Doctor honoris causa of National University of San Martín	December 2010	Buenos Aires, Argentina
Doctor honoris causa in Law of Pontifical Catholic University of Peru	February 2011	Lima, Peru
Doctor honoris causa of Philippine Normal University	March 2011	Manila, Philippines
Quadricentennial Golden Cross Award of University of Santo Tomas	March 2011	Manila, Philippines
Doctor honoris causa of National University of Political Studies and Public Administration Studies	April 2011	Bucharest, Romania
Doctor honoris causa of Golda Meir Mount Carmel International Training Center at Haifa University	May 2011	Haifa, Israel
Doctor honoris causa of University of Edinburgh	June 2011	Edinburgh, Scotland, United Kingdom
Doctor honoris causa of Mongolian University of Science and Technology	July 2011	Ulaanbaatar, Mongolia
Doctor honoris causa of Lomonosov Moscow State University	September 2011	Moscow, Russian Federation
Doctor honoris causa of University of Algiers 1	April 2012	Algiers, Algeria
Doctor honoris causa of University of Dhaka	May 2012	Dhaka, Bangladesh
Honorary Professor of Tongji University	May 2012	Shanghai, China
Honorary Distinction of Slovak University of Technology in Bratislava	May 2012	Bratislava, Slovak Republic
Honorary Distinction of Slovak Academy of Sciences	May 2012	Bratislava, Slovak Republic
Doctor honoris causa of Herzen University	June 2012	St. Petersburg, Russian Federation
Doctor honoris causa of Durham University	June 2012	Durham, United Kingdom
Doctor honoris causa of Laval University	February 2013	Quebec, Canada
Doctor honoris causa of Tongji University	May 2013	Shanghai, China
Doctor honoris causa of Diplomatic Academy of Vietnam	June 2013	Ha Noi, Vietnam
Doctor honoris causa of Eurasian National University	August 2013	Astana, Kazakhstan
Doctor honoris causa in Humanities of University of Malaya	September 2013	Kuala Lumpur, Malaysia
Honourable Medal and Diploma of National Academy of Sciences	April 2014	Kyiv, Ukraine
Doctor honoris causa of University of Yaoundé I	September 2014	Yaoundé, Cameroon
Doctor honoris causa of National Conservatory of Arts and Crafts	October 2014	Paris, France
KOÇ-KAM Semahat Arsel Distinguished Fellow of Koç University	January 2015	Istanbul, Turkey
Doctor honoris causa of University of National and World Economy	January 2015	Sofia, Bulgaria
Grand Cross of the Order of the Sun of Peru	February 2011	Lima, Peru
Grand Chancellor of the National Order of Chad	March 2012	Chad
Title of Commander of the National Order of Benin	June 2012	Benin
Officer of the Order of Cultural Merit	March 2013	Monaco
Grand Officer of the Condecoracion de la Orden Jose Matias Delgado	March 2013	El Salvador
Order of the People's Friendship of the Republic of Bashkortostan	October 2013	Bashkortostan
National Order "Juan Mora Fernández"	November 2013	Costa Rica
Order of Diplomatic Service Merit	February 2014	Seoul, Korea
Hilal-i-Pakistan Award	February 2014	Pakistan
Order of Friendship	April 2014	Kazakhstan
Order of Stara Planina (1st class)	31 March 2014	Sofia, Bulgaria
Medal "Magtymguly Pyragy"	15 May 2014	Ashgabat, Turkmenistan
Commander of the Order of the Throne	July 2014	Rabat, Morocco
Grand Officer of the Order of Valour of Cameroon	September 2014	Cameroon
Commander of the Legion of Honour	April 2015	Paris, France
Doctor honoris causa of EUniversity for Foreigners Perugia	Mars 2016	Perugia, Italia
Doctor honoris causa of University of Economics Varna	May 2016	Varna, Bulgaria
Grand Cross of the Order of Alfonso X the Wise	November 2017	Madrid, Spain
Doctor honoris causa of University of Paris-Sud	October 2018	Paris, France

On 10 June 2016, Bukova received the Global Summit of Women's Global Women's Leadership Award in Warsaw, Poland.

On 6 April 2015, the French Embassy in Bulgaria announced that Bokova has been awarded the French Order of the Legion of Honour.

On 31 March 2014, Bokova was officially awarded Bulgaria's highest national honour – the Order of Stara Planina (1st class) by president Rosen Plevneliev for her extremely significant merits to Bulgaria, bringing about an improvement in world peace and security indicators, and the development of political and cultural exchanges at the highest levels.

Political offices
Preceded by Georgi Pirinski	Minister of Foreign Affairs; Acting; 1996–1997	Succeeded by Stoyan Stalev; Acting
Diplomatic posts
Preceded by Kōichirō Matsuura	Director-General of UNESCO; 2009–2017	Succeeded by Audrey Azoulay
