= Xinhua Bookstore =

Largest bookstore chain in China

Xinhua Bookstore (Chinese: 新华书店; pinyin: Xīnhuá Shūdiàn) is the largest and only country-wide bookstore chain brand in China.

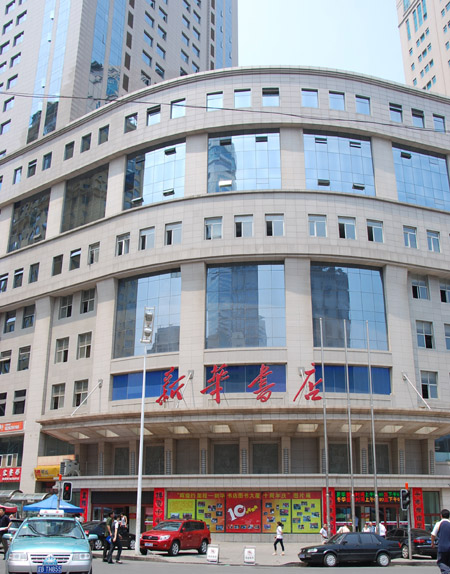
The main Xinhua Bookstore in Dalian, Liaoning, for example, is housed in a 9-story building, with a basement for CDs, DVDs and computer software.

== History ==
Xinhua Bookstore (in Chinese: 新华书店) was originally established as Guanghua Bookstore (in Chinese: 光华书店) in 1937 in Yan'an under the Propaganda Department of the Chinese Communist Party. In 1942, Guanghua Bookstore changed its name to Xinhua Bookstore.

The four Chinese letter "Xin-hua Shu-dian" logo was made in brush writing in 1948 by Chairman Mao Zedong. In 1951, during the First All-China Publishing Administration Conference, it was decided to divide the vertically integrated operation into the People's Publishing House, Xinhua Publishing Plant, and the Xinhua Bookstore.

Its control over retail bookselling decreased in the 1980s. At the same time, the sector was hit with inflation in the price of paper. Xinhua managers began to incorporate other business segments, such as selling audio and visual equipment and renting floor space to other businesses.

In 2003, all Xinhua Bookstores in Beijing was reorganized, coming under the China Publishing Group (in Chinese: 中国出版集团). China Xinhua Bookstore Association was established to manage the trademark. As China's only country-wide distribution channel for magazines, and CDs and DVDs, it plays an important role in mass media, in addition to its dominant position as a bookstore.

In 2006, there were 14,000 Xinhua bookstores in China. Its main store is now in Xicheng District in Beijing.

== Multiple distribution channels ==
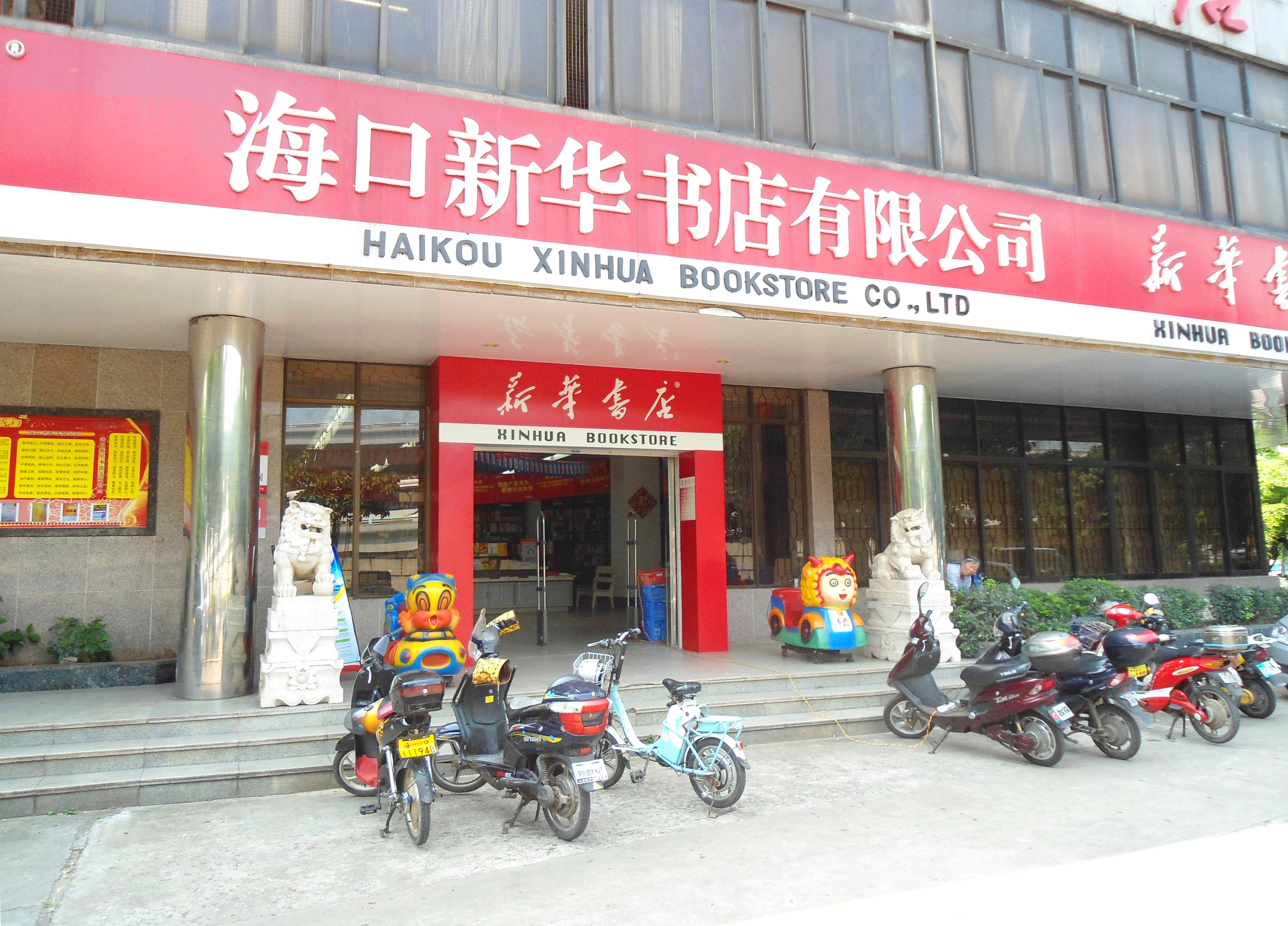
A Xinhua Bookstore in Haikou City, Hainan Province

In the larger cities in China, Xinhua Bookstore has opened "Foreign Language Bookstores" (in Chinese: 外文书店) which sell books and CDs for learning foreign languages. Books published in foreign countries are not widely sold in China and are more expensive than Chinese-language books, but they are available in large cities, though magazines from foreign countries are prohibited for distribution for political reasons.

Xinhua Bookstore's Provincial Publishing Companies have recently begun opening different distribution channels, such as the Northern Book Town (in Chinese: 北方图书城) in Liaoning Province and Boku Book Town (Chinese: 博库书城) in Zhejiang Province.

== See also ==
- Publishing in China
