= Seillière =

Seillière is a French surname. Notable people with the surname are as follows:

- Ernest Seillière (1866–1955), French writer, journalist and critic
- Ernest-Antoine Seillière (born 1937), French entrepreneur and the heir to the Wendel empire
- Florentin Seillière (1744–1825), French businessman and banker
