= François Perigot =

French businessman and trade unionist (1926–2022)

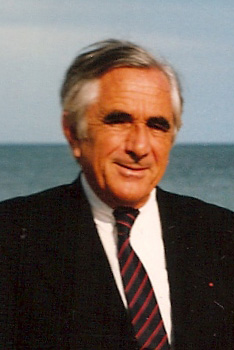

Member of the French Economic, Social and Environmental Council
- In office 1989–1999

President of BusinessEurope
- In office 1988–1998
- Preceded by: Carlos Ferrer Salat
- Succeeded by: Georges Jacobs de Hagen

President of the Conseil national du patronat français
- In office 1986–1994
- Preceded by: Yvon Gattaz
- Succeeded by: Jean Gandois

President of the Institut de l'Entreprise
- In office 1983–1986
- Preceded by: Jean Chenevier
- Succeeded by: François Guiraud

Personal details
- Born: 12 May 1926 Lyon, France
- Died: 7 January 2022 (aged 95)

François Perigot (French: [fʁɑ̃swa peʁiɡo]; 12 May 1926 – 7 January 2022) was a French businessman and trade unionist. He was President of the Conseil national du patronat français from 1986 to 1994 and President of the Mouvement des Entreprises de France from 1997 to 2005.

== Life and career ==
After graduating from Sciences Po, Perigot became Président-directeur général (PDG) of Thibaud Gibbs et Compagnie, serving from 1968 to 1970. He then served as PDG of Unilever in Spain and in France. In 1988, he succeeded Carlos Ferrer Salat as President of BusinessEurope, serving until 1998 and preceding Georges Jacobs de Hagen. In 1986, he became President of the Conseil national du patronat français, succeeding Yvon Gattaz. During his tenure, he sought to "internationalize the French economy".

From 1987 to 1989, Perigot was a member of the executive board of the International Chamber of Commerce. From 1989 to 1999, he was a member of the French Economic, Social and Environmental Council. He was President of the Chambre de commerce Franco-néerlandaise from 1996 to 2002. He then served as President of the International Organisation of Employers from 2001 to 2006. Since 2005, he had served as President Emeritus of the Mouvement des Entreprises de France.

In 2004, Perigot became a member of the World Commission on the Social Dimension of Globalization, established by the International Labour Organization. As a member of the board of directors of the Sodexho Alliance, he earned 36,100 euros in 2006 and 40,700 euros in 2007. In 2010, he created the "groupe Perigot" within the Entrepreneurs et dirigeants chrétiens. The group sought to understand the intent of the Church in the modern, global economy.

Perigot died on 7 January 2022, at the age of 95.

== Distinctions ==
- Commander and Grand-Officer of the National Order of the Legion of Honour of France
- Commander of the Order of Merit of the Republic of Poland of Poland
- Grand-Officer of the Order of the Republic of Tunisia
- Commander of the Royal Order of the Polar Star of Sweden
- Commander of the Order of Orange-Nassau of the Netherlands
- Commander of the Mexican Order of the Aztec Eagle of Mexico
- Commander of the Order of Leopold of Belgium
- Commander of the Order of Ouissam Alaouite of Morocco
- Most Excellent Sir Grand-Cross of the Order of Civil Merit of Spain
