= Périgot =

Périgot (English: /pɛərriˈɡoʊ/, French: [pɛʁiɡo]) is a surname. Notable people with the surname include:

- Marie-Théodore Périgot (1807–1888), French officer
- François Perigot (1926–2022), French businessman and trade unionist
- Françoise Laurent-Perrigot (born 1950), French politician
