= Jean Taittinger =

French politician

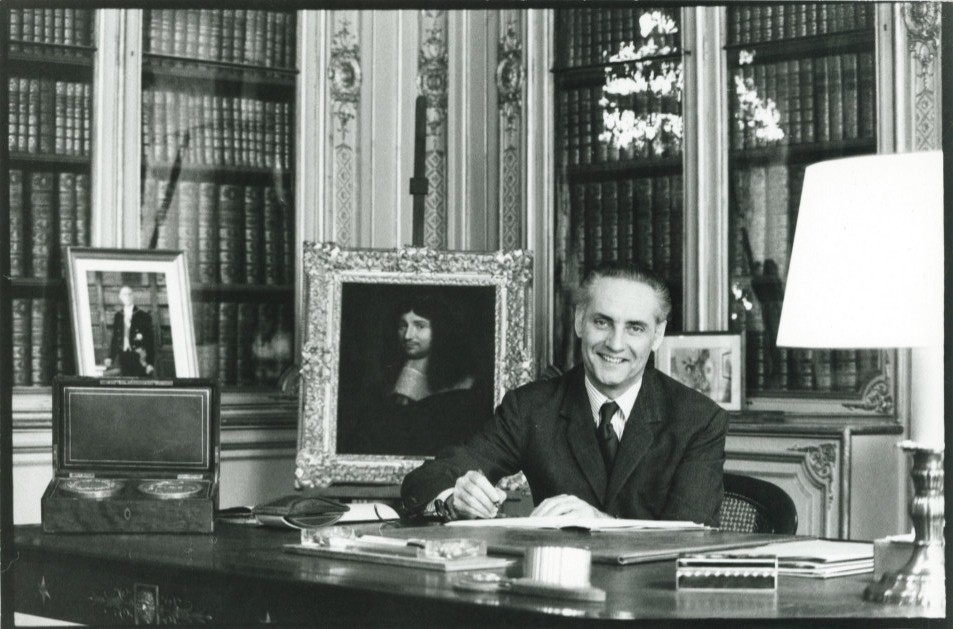

Keeper of the Seals, Minister of Justice
- In office 5 April 1973 – 28 May 1974
- President: Georges Pompidou
- Prime Minister: Pierre Messmer
- Preceded by: René Pleven
- Succeeded by: Jean Lecanuet

Mayor of Reims
- In office 15 March 1959 – 13 March 1977
- Preceded by: Pierre Schneiter
- Succeeded by: Claude Lamblin

Personal details
- Born: 25 January 1923 16th arrondissement of Paris, France
- Died: 23 September 2012 (aged 89) Épalinges, Switzerland
- Spouse: Corinne Deville
- Relations: Pierre-Christian Taittinger (half-brother)
- Parent: Pierre Taittinger
- Education: Collège Stanislas

Jean Taittinger (25 January 1923 – 23 September 2012) was a French politician and member of the champagne producing Taittinger family.

== Political career ==
Taittinger was Minister of Budget between 7 January 1971 and 5 April 1973. He also was Minister of Justice between 5 April 1973 and 28 May 1974.

Taittinger held the position of Mayor of Reims for 18 years, leaving the position in 1977.

== Taittinger family business ==
He was the son of politician and businessman Pierre Taittinger.
