= Raynal =

Raynal is a surname of French origin. Notable people with the surname include:

- Aline Marie Raynal (born 1937), French botanist and botanical illustrator
- David Raynal (1840–1903), French politician
- Emmanuel-Alain Raynal (born 1981), French animation producer
- Étienne Weill-Raynal (1887–1982), French historian, resistant, journalist and Socialist politician
- François Édouard Raynal (1830–1898), French sailor
- Frédérick Raynal (born 1966), French video game designer and programmer
- Guillaume Thomas François Raynal (1713–1796), French writer
- Jacques Raynal, French Polynesian politician
- Jean Raynal (1929–2015), French sports journalist
- Mathieu Raynal, French rugby union referee
- Maurice Raynal (1884–1954), French art critic
- Michel Raynal (born 1949), French computer scientist
- Paul Raynal (1885–1971), French playwright
- Sylvain Eugène Raynal (1867–1939), French military officer
