= Pierre-Christian Taittinger =

French politician (1926–2009)

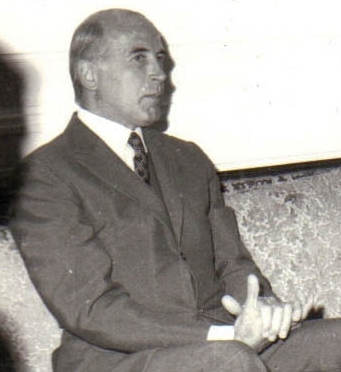
- Pierre-Christian Taittinger in 1974

Mayor of the 16th arrondissement of Paris
- In office 19 March 1989 – 29 March 2008
- Preceded by: Georges Mesmin
- Succeeded by: Claude Goasguen

Member of the French Senate for Paris
- In office 26 September 1977 – 24 September 1995

Secretary of State for Foreign Affairs
- In office 29 August 1976 – 26 September 1977
- President: Valéry Giscard d'Estaing
- Prime Minister: Raymond Barre
- Preceded by: Jean François-Poncet
- Succeeded by: Jean-François Deniau

Secretary of State for the Interior
- In office 12 January 1976 – 25 August 1976
- President: Valéry Giscard d'Estaing
- Prime Minister: Jacques Chirac
- Succeeded by: Olivier Stirn

Personal details
- Born: 5 February 1926 Paris, France
- Died: 27 September 2009 (aged 83) Versailles, France
- Party: RPR; UMP
- Relations: Jean Taittinger (half-brother)
- Parent(s): Pierre Taittinger; Anne-Marie Mailly
- Education: Collège Stanislas de Paris
- Profession: Lawyer

Pierre-Christian Taittinger (French pronunciation: [pjɛʁ kʁistjɑ̃ tɛtɛ̃ʒe]; 5 February 1926 – 27 September 2009) was a French politician, mayor of the 16th arrondissement of Paris between 1989 and 2008 and Senator for Paris between 1977 and 1995. After studying law he became a lawyer in 1947 and was elected as a municipal councillor for Paris in 1953 and remained so until his death in 2009.

He was the son of Pierre Taittinger founder of the champagne producing company Taittinger and the brother of Jean Taittinger both of whom were also politicians.

== Biography ==
Son of Pierre Taittinger, industrialist and former president of the Paris City Council, he is the brother of Jean Taittinger, deputy mayor of Reims and Minister of Justice.

After studying law, Pierre Taittinger Jean Taittinger became a lawyer at the Court of Appeal in 1947. He was elected to the Paris City Council in 1953.

During his professional career, he served as president of the Société de Hôtel Lutetia, the Société de l'Hôtel Terminus, the Société du Louvre, and Taittinger.

In 1974, he was assigned to a temporary six-month mission with the Minister of Administrative Reform. He is initiating projects to reform the administrative structures of the Paris region. In 1977, he joined the Independent Republicans, the movement led by President Valéry Giscard d'Estaing.

In 1984, he joined the Renaissance Circle.

Constamment réélu sénateur de Paris, il est candidat à la présidence du Senate (France) en 1989.But just before the third round of voting, Charles Pasqua, president of the RPR group, called for a vote for Alain Poher: as a result, Pierre-Christian Taittinger was 16 votes behind the outgoing president.

He is buried in the 12th division of Passy Cemetery in 16th arrondissement of Paris arrondissement.
