= Sandra Boëlle =

French politician (born 1961)

Member of the National Assembly for Paris's 14th constituency
- In office 28 May 2020 – 21 June 2022
- Preceded by: Claude Goasguen
- Succeeded by: Benjamin Haddad

Councillor of Paris
- Incumbent
- Assumed office 28 June 2020
- Constituency: 16th arrondissement

Personal details
- Born: 26 May 1961 (age 64); Neuilly-sur-Seine, France
- Political party: Union for a Popular Movement (until 2015); The Republicans (2015–present)

Sandrine "Sandra" Boëlle (French pronunciation: [sɑ̃dʁa bɔɛl]; née Bachy, 26 May 1961) is a French politician who represented the 14th constituency of Paris in the National Assembly from 2020 to 2022. A member of The Republicans (LR), she succeeded Claude Goasguen as his substitute upon his death.

== Biography ==
Boëlle was born in Neuilly-sur-Seine. She has been a councillor of the 16th arrondissement of Paris since 2014 and of Paris since 2020.

She was the substitute for long-term deputy Claude Goasguen at the 2017 legislative election. When Goasguen died from a heart attack after contracting COVID-19, Boëlle took his place on the National Assembly. In Parliament, she sat on the Committee on Foreign Affairs.

Boëlle did not compete for the seat at the 2022 legislative election; instead Francis Szpiner was nominated by The Republicans, but lost to Benjamin Haddad of La République En Marche!
