= Ernest-Antoine Seillière =

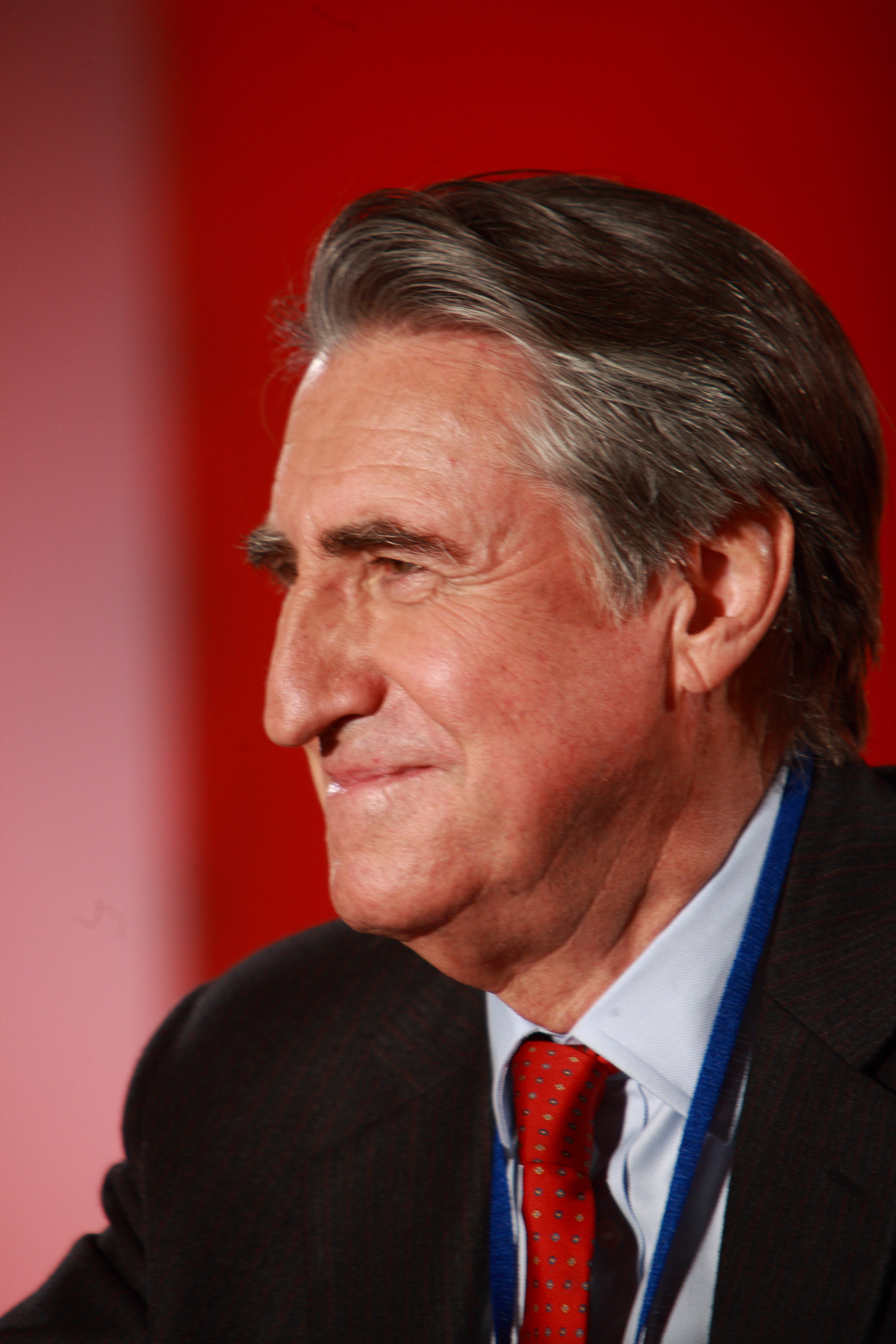
- Born: Ernest-Antoine Seillière de Laborde; 20 December 1937 (age 88); Neuilly-sur-Seine, France
- Education: Sciences Po; École nationale d'administration
- Occupation: Head of the MEDEF (1998–2005)
- Predecessor: Position established
- Successor: Laurence Parisot
- Children: 5, including Joséphine Missoffe

Ernest-Antoine Seillière de Laborde (French pronunciation: [ɛʁnɛstɑ̃twan sɛjɛʁ]; born 20 December 1937) is a French entrepreneur and the heir to the Wendel empire (representing €730 million).

He is a member of Le Siècle think tank, an officer of the Légion d'honneur, and an officer of the Ordre National du Mérite. He was convicted of tax fraud in 2022.

His great-grandfather, Aimé Seillière (1835–1870) was married to Marie de Laborde (1844–1867) in 1865. His paternal grandfather is the French academic Ernest Seillière.

== Career ==
He graduated from the Institut d'Études Politiques de Paris, studying in law and a former pupil of the École nationale d'administration. Vice President of the CNPF and member of its executive council from 1988 to 1997, President of the economic commission of the CNPF from 1988 to 1994, he became president of Medef (formerly CNPF) from December 1997 to 5 June 2005. He was CEO of Wendel, a holding company for the CGIP, chairman of the supervisory board from 2002 to March 2013, Honorary chairman since then. Seillière is close to the Traditionalist Catholics, in particular of the abbé Laguérie.

He is a former member of the Steering Committee of the Bilderberg Group and participated in all their conferences between 1979 and 1987 as well as 1992 and 2002.

In 2022, he was given a three-year suspended prison sentence along with the maximum fine allowed by law at that time for his participation in a tax evasion scheme at the Wendell group in 2007.

== At the MEDEF ==
He succeeded Jean Gandois as leader of the CNPF in December 1997, after the dismissal of the appeal to cut the weekly working hours to 35 by the Lionel Jospin government. The union then took a more conservative direction, which was led by Denis Kessler, and changed its name. He retired after seven years as leader. Laurence Parisot succeeded him on 5 July 2005. Since winter 2005, Ernest-Antoine Seillière has been President of UNICE (renamed "BusinessEurope" in Janvier 2007), the federation of European business, based in Brussels.

== Publications ==
In March 2012, he published a book entitled "On n'est pas là pour se faire engueuler..." ("We are not here to be yelled at"), in which he analyzes the financial crisis, based on his experience as head of Medef and BusinessEurope. He also exposes his vision of France and Europe's future and shares some personal memories.

== Bibliography ==
- Bothorel, Jean; Sassier, Phillippe (2002). Ernest-Antoine Seillière : le baron de la République. Paris: Robert Laffont. ISBN 9782221093573. OCLC 51638015.
