= Victor Ségoffin =

French sculptor

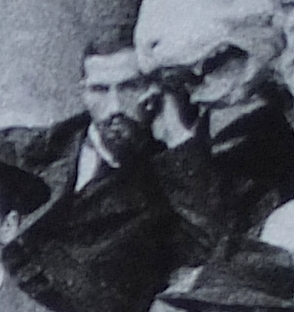
Photo of Ségoffin, 1901

Victor Joseph Jean Ambroise Ségoffin (5 March 1867 – 17 October 1925) was a French sculptor.

== Biography ==
Born in Toulouse, Ségoffin's early education was at the Lycée Pierre-de-Fermat. After school he was admitted to the Toulouse School of Fine Arts in the studio of Charles Ponsin-Andarahy. In 1887, having become an orphan, he joined the army. He took further education at the École nationale supérieure des Beaux-Arts in Paris under Louis-Ernest Barrias and Pierre-Jules Cavelier. Ségoffin won the Prix de Rome for sculpture in 1897. His work was part of the sculpture event in the art competition at the 1912 Summer Olympics.

In 1920 he was appointed head of the women's studio at the École des Beaux-Arts. In 1906 he was made a chevalier of the Légion d'honneur, and an officier in 1911. A street in Toulouse is named after him.

== Works ==
His most notable works include:

- The war dance, marble, Musée d'Orsay, 1903–1905
- Sacred Mask Dance, bronze, Musée d'Orsay, 1905
- marble monument of Voltaire, meant for the Pantheon, now in the courtyard of the Lycée Voltaire, 1907–1921
- bronze Le Génie et le Temps, in the Cour Napoleon at the Louvre Palace, 1908, melted down during the German occupation
- bust of the Cuban-French poet José-Maria de Heredia, bronze, Jardin du Luxembourg
- Therese Combarieu, marble, Toulouse, Musée des Augustins
- Denise Combarieu, bronze, Toulouse, Musée des Augustins
- Emile Cartailhac, bronze, Museum of Toulouse, 1914

== Gallery ==
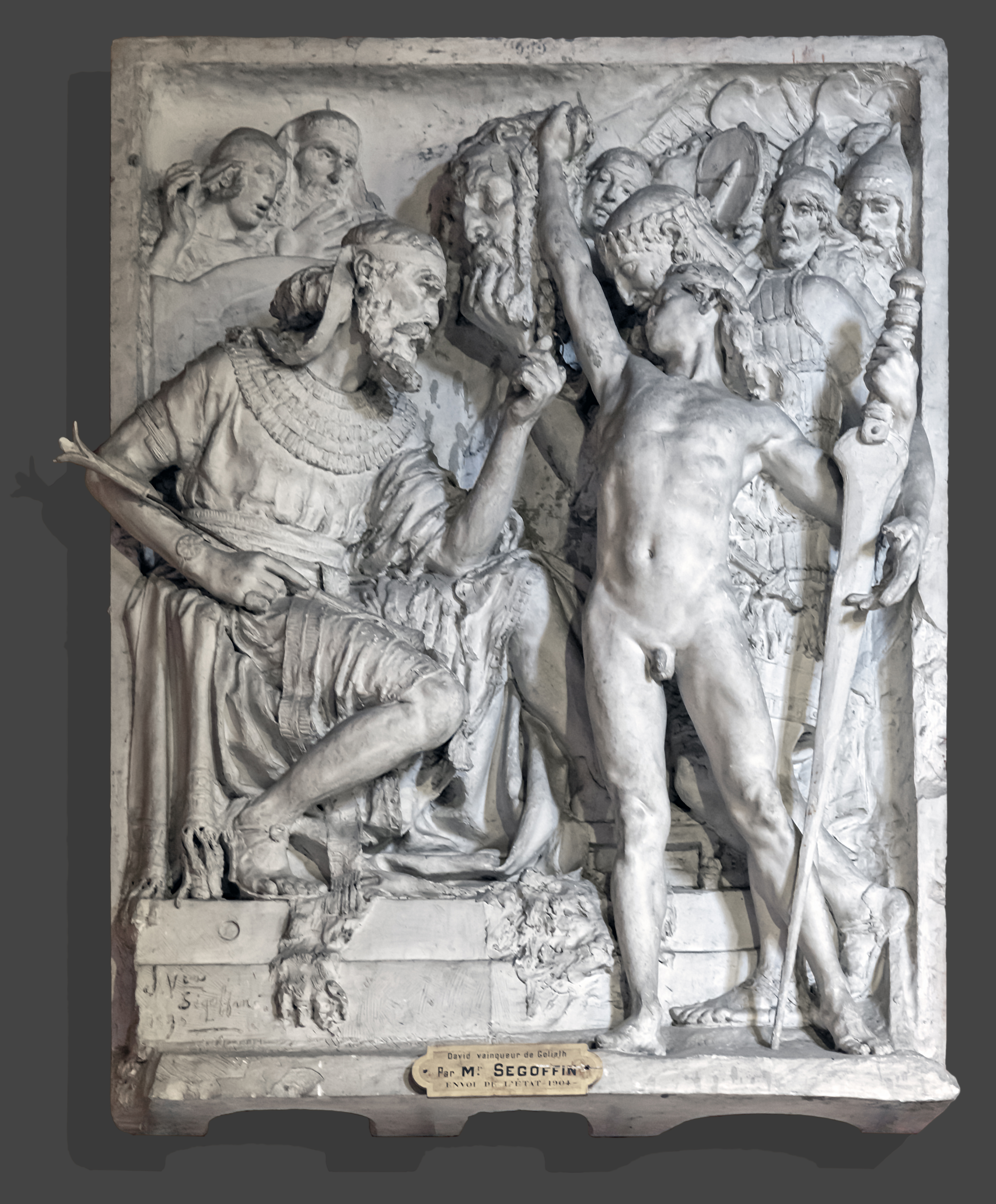
David victorious over Goliath (1895), Toulouse, Musée des Augustins

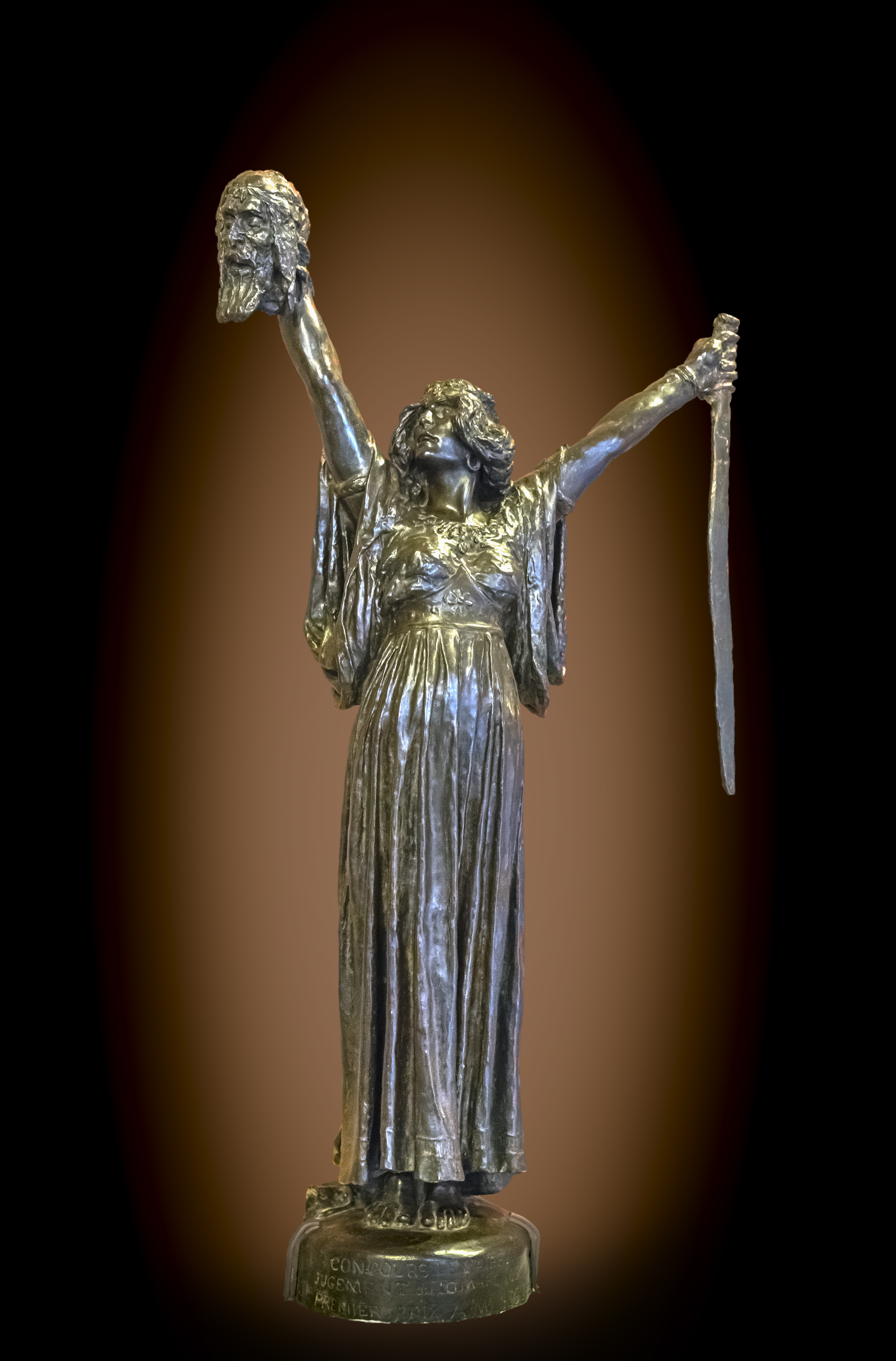
Judith with the head of Holofernes, Toulouse, Musée des Augustins

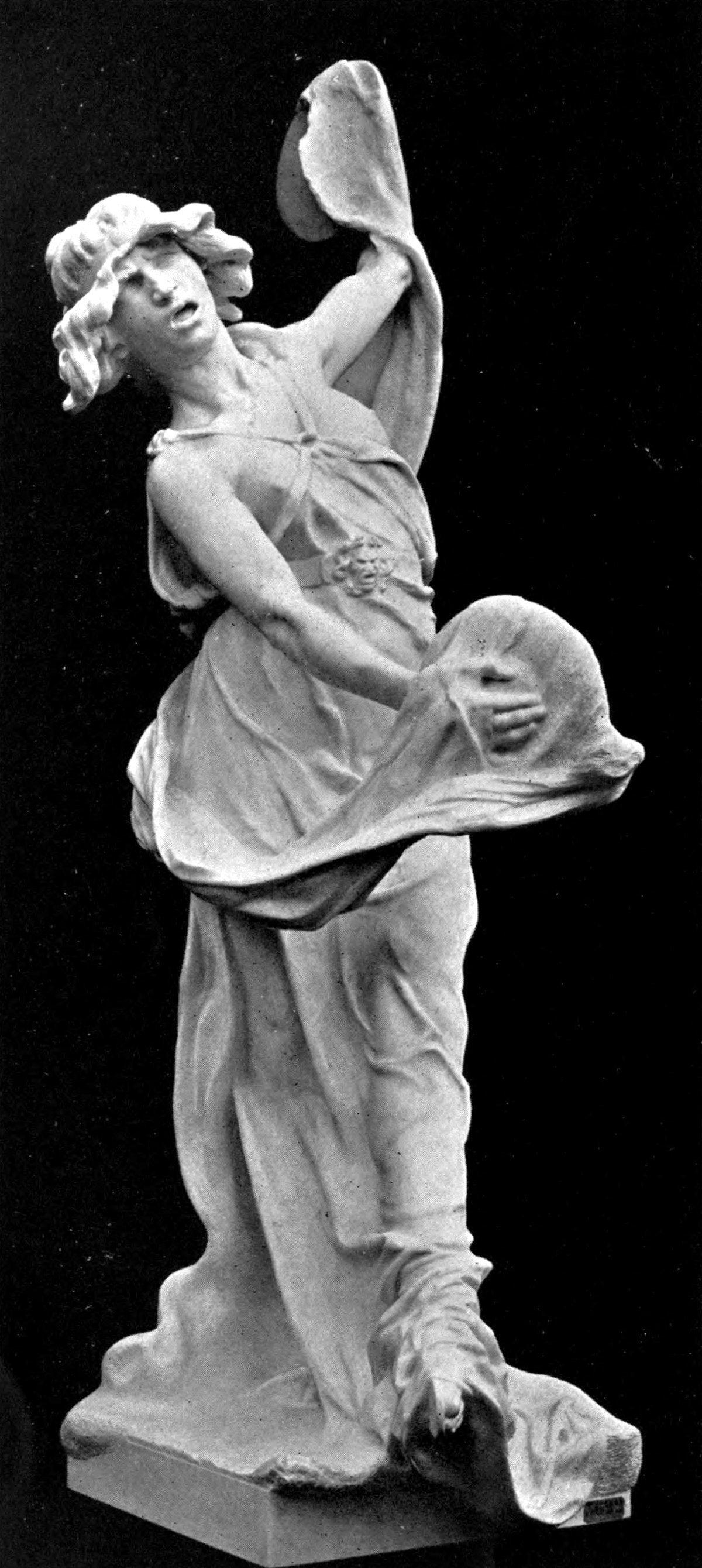
Danse Sacrée (1905), Paris, Musée d'Orsay.

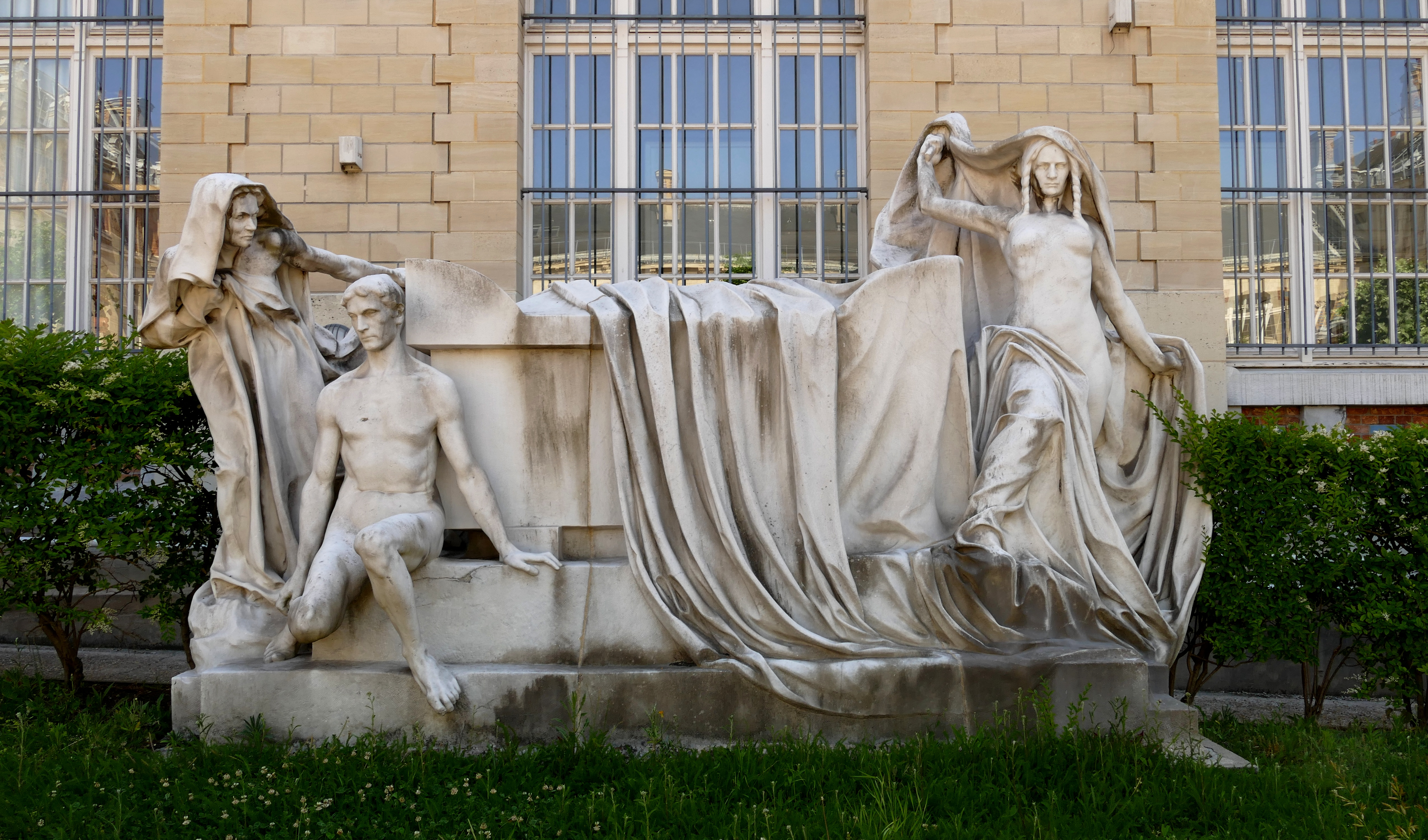
Monument à Voltaire (1907), Paris, Lycée Voltaire.

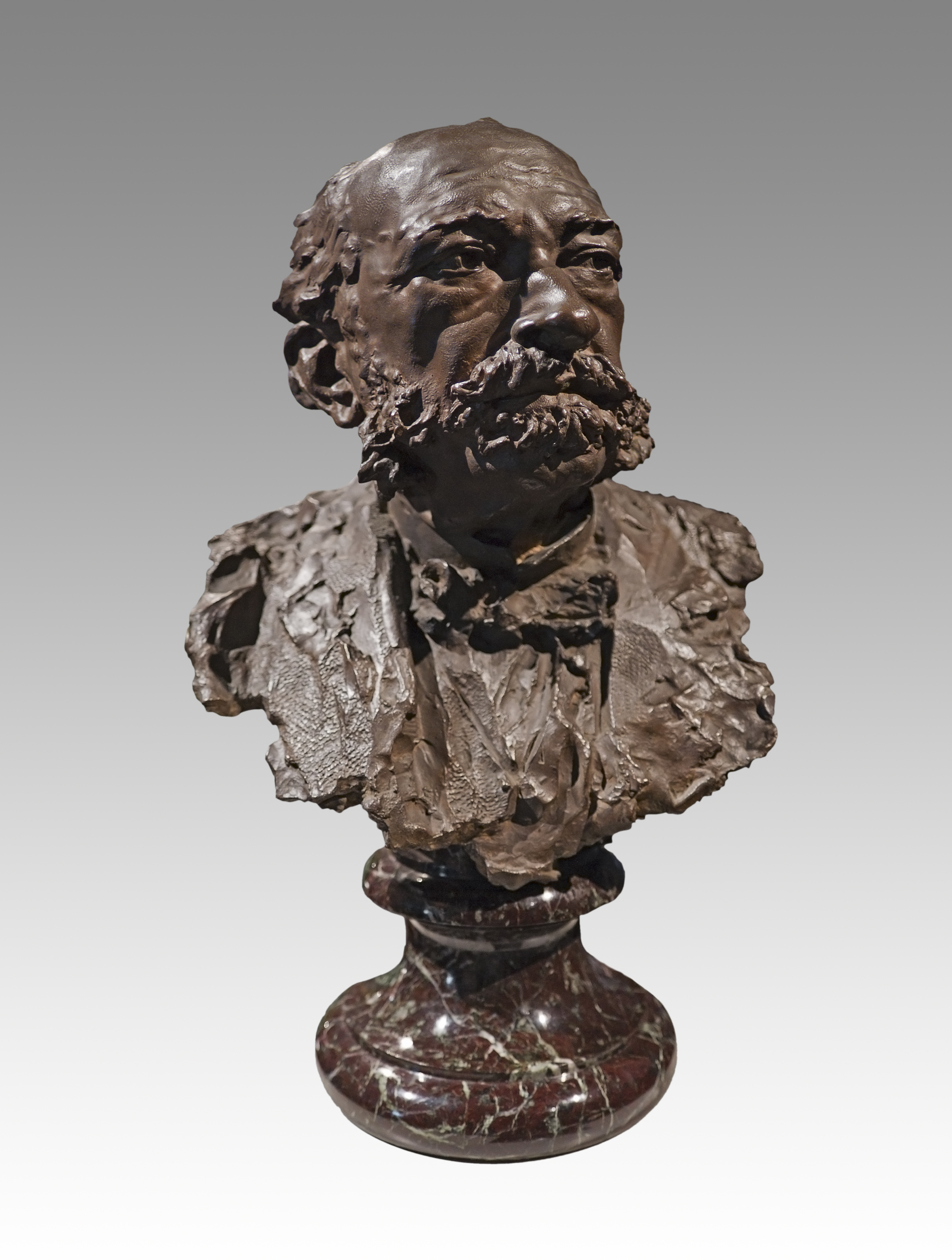
Bust of Emile Cartailhac (1914), Musée de Toulouse.

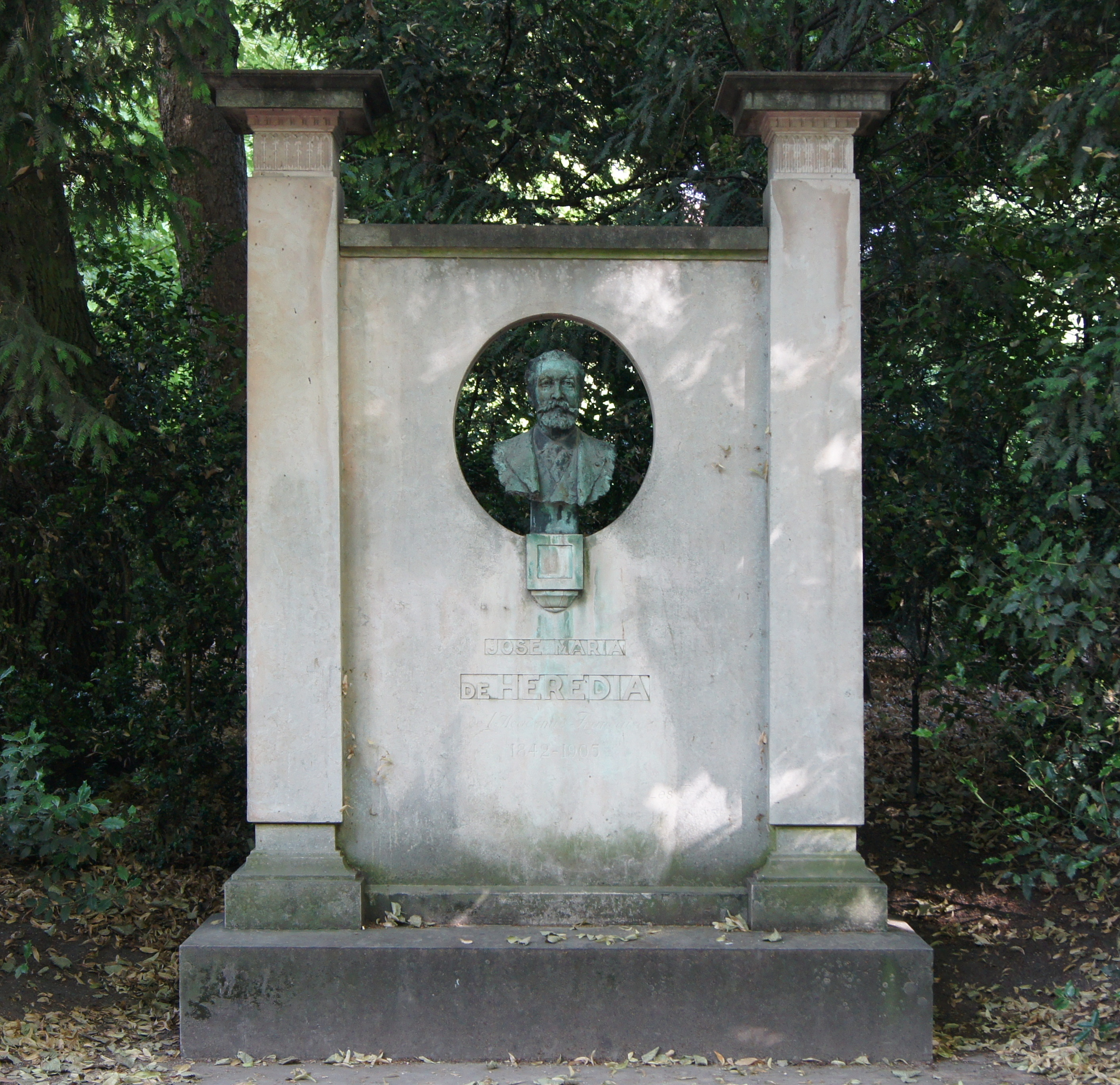
Bust of the Cuban-French poet José-Maria de Heredia, bronze, Jardin du Luxembourg

== Bibliography ==
- Luce Rivet, "Victor Ségoffin (1867-1923)", Revue du Comminges, 2e trimestre 1988
- Guillaume Peigné, Dictionnaire des sculpteurs néo-baroques français (1870-1914), Paris, CTHS, Coll. Format no 71, 2012, 559 p. (ISBN 9782735507801), p. 445-454
