= Paris's 14th constituency =

Constituency of the National Assembly of France

14th constituency of Paris
- inline Constituency of the National Assembly of France

- Paris, showing its post 2012 legislative constituencies
- Deputy: Joséphine Missoffe; RE
- Department: Paris
- Registered voters: 72,364

The 14th constituency of Paris (French: Quatorzième circonscription de Paris) is a French legislative constituency in the Paris département (75). Like the other 576 French constituencies, it elects one MP using the two-round system. Its boundaries were heavily redrawn in 1988 and 2012.

14th constituency of Paris
- inline Constituency of the National Assembly of France

- Paris, showing its legislative constituencies between 1988 and 2012
- Member: constituency abolished, 2012
- Department: Paris

Map of Paris constituencies in 1981.

== Historic representation ==
Election	Member	Party	Source
1958	Jean-Baptiste Biaggi	UNR	
1962	Hubert Germain	UNR	
1967	Serge Boucheny	PCF	
1968	Hubert Germain	UDR	
1972	Jean Turco	UDR	
1973	Hubert Germain	UDR	
1973	Jean Turco	UDR	
1978	Paul Quilès	PS	
1981	Paul Quilès	PS	
1983	Serge Blisko	PS	
1986	Proportional representation - no election by constituency		
1988	Georges Mesmin	UDF	
1993	Georges Mesmin	UDF	
1997	Claude Goasguen	UDF	
2002	Claude Goasguen	UMP	
2007	Claude Goasguen	UMP	
2012	Claude Goasguen	UMP	
2017	Claude Goasguen	LR	
2020	Sandra Boëlle	LR	
2022	Benjamin Haddad	RE	
2024	Joséphine Missoffe	RE	

== Election results ==
=== 2024 ===
Candidate	Party	Alliance	First round			Second round		
Candidate	Party	Alliance	Votes	%	+/–	Votes	%	+/–
Benjamin Haddad	RE	ENS	26,361	47.71	+8.44	34,722	72.33	+19.10
Patrick Dray	LR		9,775	17.70	-15.58	WITHDREW		
Louis Piquet	LR-RN	UXD	9,702	17.56	+14.03	13,282	27.67	N/A
Hugo Rota	LFI	NFP	7,693	13.93	+2.46			
Thomas Culerrier	REC		1,177	2.13	-8.23			
Eric Molinari	DVC		414	2.13	N/A			
Marie Bourdy	LO		123	0.22	-0.13			
Sacha Élie Zaouati	EXG		0	0.00	N/A			
Valid votes			55,235	99.13	+0.08	48,004	96.32	+0.20
Blank votes			340	0.61	-0.06	1,498	3.01	-0.12
Null votes			144	0.26	-0.02	336	0.67	-0.08
Turnout			55,719	72.92	+18.97	49,838	65.23	+14.51
Abstentions			20,689	27.08	-18.97	26,570	34.77	-14.51
Registered voters			76,408			76,408		
Source: Ministry of the Interior, Le Monde
Result						RE HOLD		

=== 2022 ===
Legislative Election 2022: Paris's 14th constituency
Party	Candidate	Votes	%	±%
LREM (Ensemble)	Benjamin Haddad	15,964	39.27	-4.93
LR (UDC)	Francis Szpiner	13,527	33.28	-4.71
LFI (NUPÉS)	Julie Maury	4,654	11.45	+6.60
REC	Sébastien Pilard	4,211	10.36	N/A
RN	Anne de la Brelie	1,435	3.53	+0.17
Others	N/A	857		
Turnout		41,035	53.95	−1.65
2nd round result
LREM (Ensemble)	Benjamin Haddad	19,742	53.23	+5.66
LR (UDC)	Francis Szpiner	17,347	46.77	−5.66
Turnout		37,089	50.72	−0.77
LREM gain from LR				

=== 2017 ===
Legislative Election 2017: Paris's 14th constituency
Party	Candidate	Votes	%	±%
LREM	Valérie Bougault-Delage	17,654	44.20	N/A
LR	Claude Goasguen	15,173	37.99	−20.12
FN	Armelle Goasguen	1,341	3.36	−2.13
DVD	Ghislain Lafont	1,327	3.32	N/A
PS	Pierre-Alain Weill	1,001	2.51	−13.61
LFI	Alexandra Mouton	935	2.34	N/A
Others	N/A	2,512		
Turnout		40,234	55.60	−1.05
2nd round result
LR	Claude Goasguen	19,029	52.43	N/A
LREM	Valérie Bougault-Delage	17,263	47.57	N/A
Turnout		37,259	51.49	N/A
LR hold		Swing		

=== 2012 ===
Legislative Election 2012: Paris's 14th constituency
Party	Candidate	Votes	%	±%
UMP	Claude Goasguen	23,012	58.11	−7.72
PS	Annie Novelli	6,385	16.12	+5.19
DVD	David Alphand	3,504	8.85	N/A
FN	Marc De Joussineau	2,172	5.49	+2.92
MoDem	Béatrice Lecouturier	943	2.38	−9.00
DVD	Antoine Beauquier	875	2.21	N/A
EELV	Catherine Ribes	858	2.17	N/A
Others	N/A	1,849		
Turnout		39,598	56.65	−5.37
UMP hold				

=== 2007 ===
Elections between 1988 and 2007 were based on the 1988 boundaries.

Map of Paris Constituencies, 1988-2007 elections

Legislative Election 2007: Paris's 14th constituency
Party	Candidate	Votes	%	±%
UMP	Claude Goasguen	20,580	65.83	
MoDem	Wladimir D'Ormesson	3,559	11.38	
PS	Jean-Yves Mano	3,418	10.93	
FN	Farid Smahi	803	2.57	
MPF	Geoffroy De Dieuleveult	661	2.11	
Others	N/A	2,243		
Turnout		31,483	62.02	
UMP hold				

=== 2002 ===
Legislative Election 2002: Paris's 14th constituency
Party	Candidate	Votes	%	±%
UMP	Claude Goasguen	19,146	61.18	
PS	Jeanne Mondolini	4,473	14.29	
DVD	Guy Flesselles	2,635	8.42	
FN	Richard Haddad	2,153	6.88	
Others	N/A	2,885		
Turnout		31,571	68.61	
UMP gain from UDF				

=== 1997 ===
Legislative Election 1997: Paris's 14th constituency
Party	Candidate	Votes	%	±%
UDF	Claude Goasguen	12,163	40.76	
DVD	Georges Mesmin	6,201	20.78	
PS	Jean-Yves Mano	4,144	13.89	
FN	Jacques Lafay	2,965	9.94	
DVD	Marie-Thérèse Junot	1,543	5.17	
LV	Philippe Nieto	736	2.47	
Others	N/A	2,090		
Turnout		30,616	63.21	
2nd round result
UDF	Claude Goasguen	16,005	65.30	
DVD	Georges Mesmin	8,506	34.70	
Turnout		27,427	56.66	
UDF hold				
