= Benjamin Haddad =

French politician (born 1985)

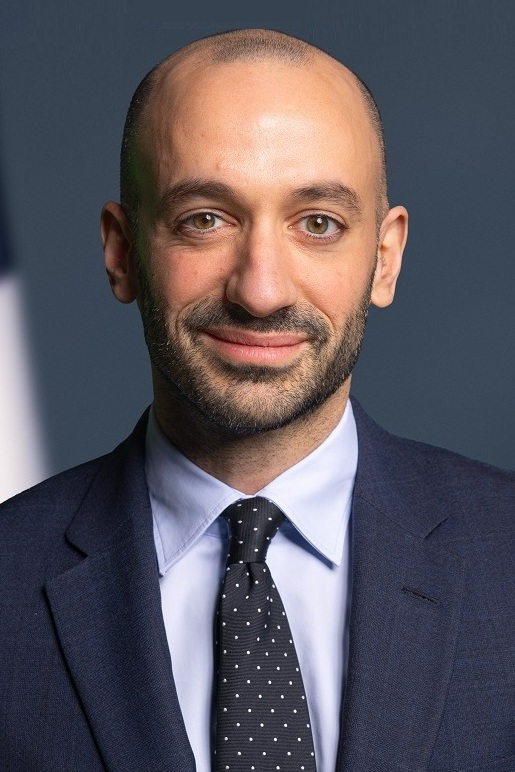
- Haddad in 2024

Minister Delegate for European Affairs
- Incumbent
- Assumed office 21 September 2024
- Prime Minister: Michel Barnier; François Bayrou; Sébastien Lecornu
- Preceded by: Jean-Noël Barrot

Member of the National Assembly for Paris's 14th constituency
- In office 22 June 2022 – 21 October 2024
- Preceded by: Sandra Boëlle
- Succeeded by: Joséphine Missoffe

Personal details
- Born: 23 October 1985 (age 40) Paris, France
- Party: Renaissance (2016–present)
- Other political affiliations: UMP (formerly)
- Education: Sciences Po; HEC Paris

Benjamin Haddad (French pronunciation: [bɛ̃ʒamɛ̃ adad]; born 23 October 1985) is a French politician who has served as Minister Delegate for European Affairs in the governments of successive Prime Ministers Michel Barnier, François Bayrou and Sébastien Lecornu since 2024. A member of Renaissance (RE), he previously served in the National Assembly from 2022 to 2024, representing Paris's 14th constituency, which encompasses most of its 16th arrondissement.

== Early life and education ==
Haddad was born in the 16th arrondissement of Paris in a Sephardic Jewish family from Tunisia. He obtained a Master of Arts in international affairs from Sciences Po in Paris and an MA from HEC Paris in financial economics.

== Early career ==
From 2014 to 2018, Haddad was a fellow at the Hudson Institute in Washington, DC. From 2019 to 2022, he worked as senior director of the Atlantic Council's Europe Centre. In 2019, he published his book Le paradis perdu : L'Amérique de Trump et la fin des illusions européennes.

== Political career ==
Prior to being elected to the National Assembly, Haddad was an activist within the Union for a Popular Movement in the early 2010s. He joined Emmanuel Macron's En Marche movement in 2016, which would later be renamed La République En Marche! and Renaissance.

In the 2022 legislative election, Haddad defeated Francis Szpiner of The Republicans in the 14th constituency of Paris with 53.2% of the second-round vote.

In Parliament, he served on both the Committee on Foreign Affairs and Committee on European Affairs. In addition to his committee assignments, he chaired the French-Ukrainian parliamentary friendship group. In December 2023, Haddad co-authored a joint letter of more than a hundred senior European lawmakers to their counterparts in the United States, pleading for the United States Congress to unlock further military aid to Ukraine in response to the Russian invasion of the country.

In September 2024, Haddad was appointed to the government of Prime Minister Michel Barnier as Minister Delegate for European Affairs under Foreign Minister Jean-Noël Barrot. In the days following his appointment, he announced he would advocate for the European Union to tighten its immigration policy guidelines: "Everywhere, in all of our countries, beyond the left-right divide, there's a strong demand from our citizens to take control of our immigration".

== Political positions ==
After the 2026 state elections in Germany's Saxony-Anhalt, Haddad warned of increased nationalism and xenophobia.
