= Jean Turco =

French politician (born 1917)

- Turco in 2025

Member of the National Assembly for Paris's 14th constituency
- In office 6 May 1973 – 2 April 1978
- Preceded by: Hubert Germain
- Succeeded by: Paul Quilès
- In office 7 August 1972 – 1 April 1973
- Preceded by: Hubert Germain
- Succeeded by: Hubert Germain

Personal details
- Born: Jean Turco; 19 December 1917 (age 108) Villejuif, Seine, France
- Party: UDR

Jean Turco (born 19 December 1917) is a French politician.

On 6 August 1972, Turco succeeded Hubert Germain as a member of the National Assembly representing Paris's 14th constituency. Germain reclaimed the seat on 1 April 1973, but was replaced for a second time by Turco on 6 May 1973. Turco served uninterrupted until 2 April 1978. He turned 100 in December 2017. In July 2024, aged 106, as the oldest living former member of the National Assembly, he carried the Olympic flame in the run up to the 2024 Summer Olympics.

== Life and career ==
Turco began his military service in 1938 and was still serving when war was declared. During the French campaign, he served in the 46th GRDI (Infantry Division Reconnaissance Group). Taken prisoner, he attempted to escape twice, but did not regain his freedom until the end of the war.

From 1958 to 1986, he was Hubert Germain's (1920–2021) deputy in the National Assembly in the 14th district of Paris, replacing him twice when Germain was appointed to various governments under Pierre Messmer. Both men went on to become centenarians.

As the oldest former member of the French National Assembly, then aged 106, he was chosen by the President of the National Assembly, Yaël Braun-Pivet, to carry the Olympic torch within the chamber ahead of the 2024 Summer Olympics.

He has been the oldest known living man in France since the death of 110-year-old Henri Content on 14 February 2026.
