= Claude Goasguen =

French politician (1945–2020)

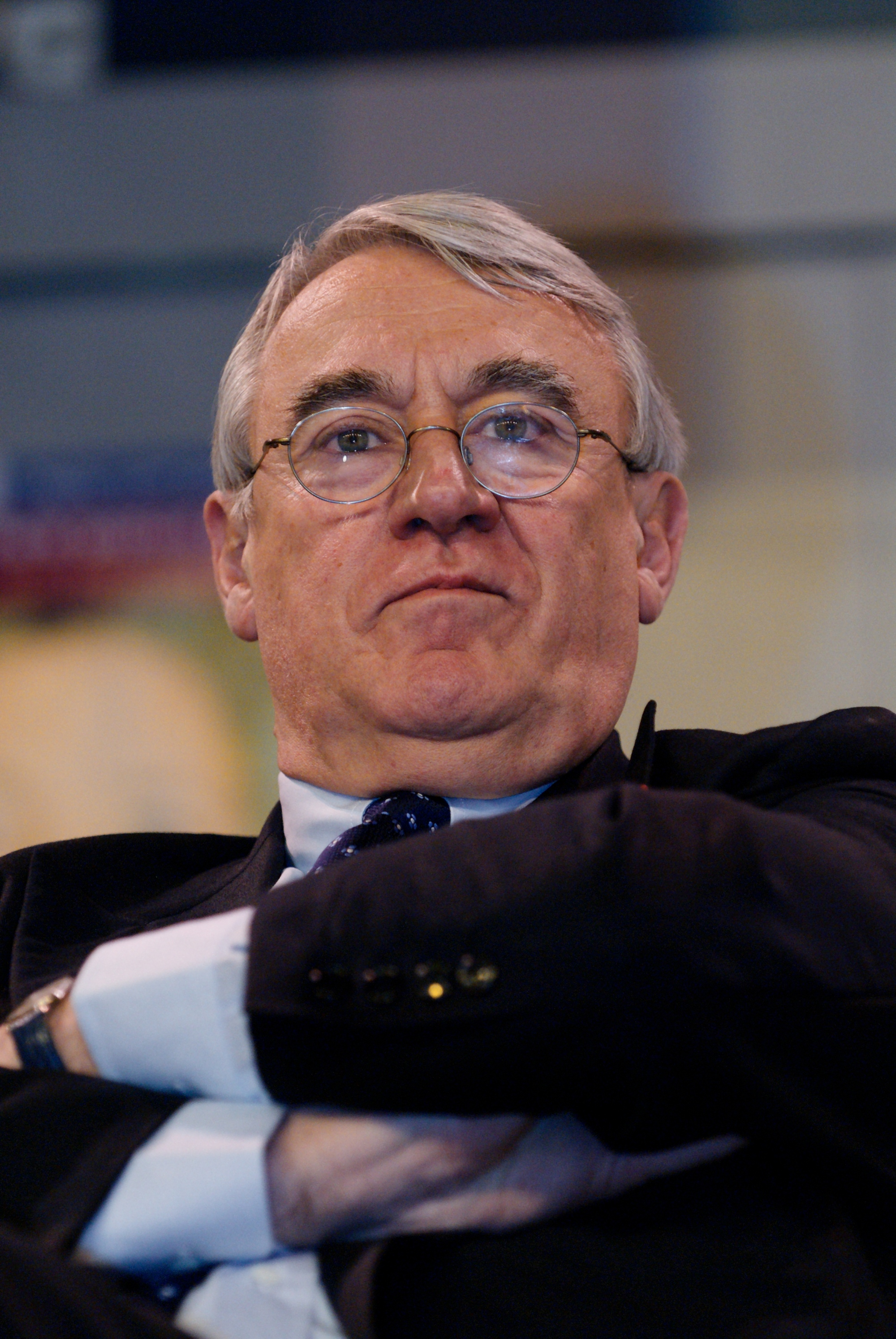
- Goasguen in 2008

Mayor of the 16th arrondissement of Paris
- In office 19 March 2008 – 11 July 2017
- Preceded by: Pierre-Christian Taittinger
- Succeeded by: Danièle Giazzi

Minister of Reform of the State, Decentralisation and Citizenship
- In office 18 May 1995 – 7 November 1995
- Prime Minister: Alain Juppé
- Preceded by: Position established
- Succeeded by: Dominique Perben

Member of the National Assembly for Paris
- In office 12 June 1997 – 28 May 2020
- Preceded by: Georges Mesmin
- Succeeded by: Sandra Boëlle
- Constituency: 14th
- In office 2 May 1993 – 18 June 1995
- Preceded by: Jacques Toubon
- Succeeded by: Jacques Toubon
- Constituency: 10th

Councillor of Paris
- In office 1983–2020
- Mayor: Jacques Chirac; Jean Tiberi; Bertrand Delanoë; Anne Hidalgo

Personal details
- Born: 12 March 1945 Toulon, France
- Died: 28 May 2020 (aged 75) Issy-les-Moulineaux, France
- Cause of death: Cardiac arrest
- Party: Independent Republicans (1966–1977); Centre of Social Democrats (1977–1995); Democratic Force (1995–1997); Liberal Democracy (1997–2002); UMP (2002–2015); The Republicans (2015–2020)
- Education: Lycée Henri-IV
- Alma mater: Paris 2 Panthéon-Assas University
- Profession: Lawyer

Claude Goasguen (12 March 1945 – 28 May 2020) was a French politician who served as a member of the National Assembly for Paris from 1993 to 1995 and again from 1997 until his death in 2020. A member of The Republicans, he also briefly was Minister of Reform of the State, Decentralisation and Citizenship in 1995 under Prime Minister Alain Juppé.

== Biography ==
=== Early years ===
Claude Goasguen was born in Toulon, Var. He received a Doctorate in Law from Panthéon-Assas University. From 1976 to 1986, he taught at Paris 13 University, and he served as the Dean of the Law School from 1982 to 1984. From 1986 to 1988, he served as advisor to the Minister of National Education, René Monory, with regards to the links between universities and the private sector, and professional training. From December 1987 to January 1991, he served as university rector.

=== Cabinet member ===
From May to November 1995, Goasguen served as Minister of State Reforms, Decentralisation and Citizenship under Prime Minister Juppé. From April 1996 to May 1998, he was secretary general of the now-defunct FD and its successor the UDF; from June 1998 to April 2002, he was vice-president and spokesperson of the now-defunct Liberal Democracy. From 2003, he also worked as a lawyer in Paris.

He was well known for his controversial comments on the Palestinian people and on the Muslim community living in France.

Goasguen was a vigorous supporter of oppressed Christian minorities in the Near East and has spoken prominently at public meetings concerning them in Autumn 2015. He was a recipient of the Legion of Honour. He died on 28 May 2020 in Issy-les-Moulineaux at the age of 75 from a heart attack after having contracted COVID-19 earlier in March during the COVID-19 pandemic in France. He was replaced in the Assembly by Sandra Boëlle.
