= Domaine Carneros =

Winery in Napa Valley, California, United States

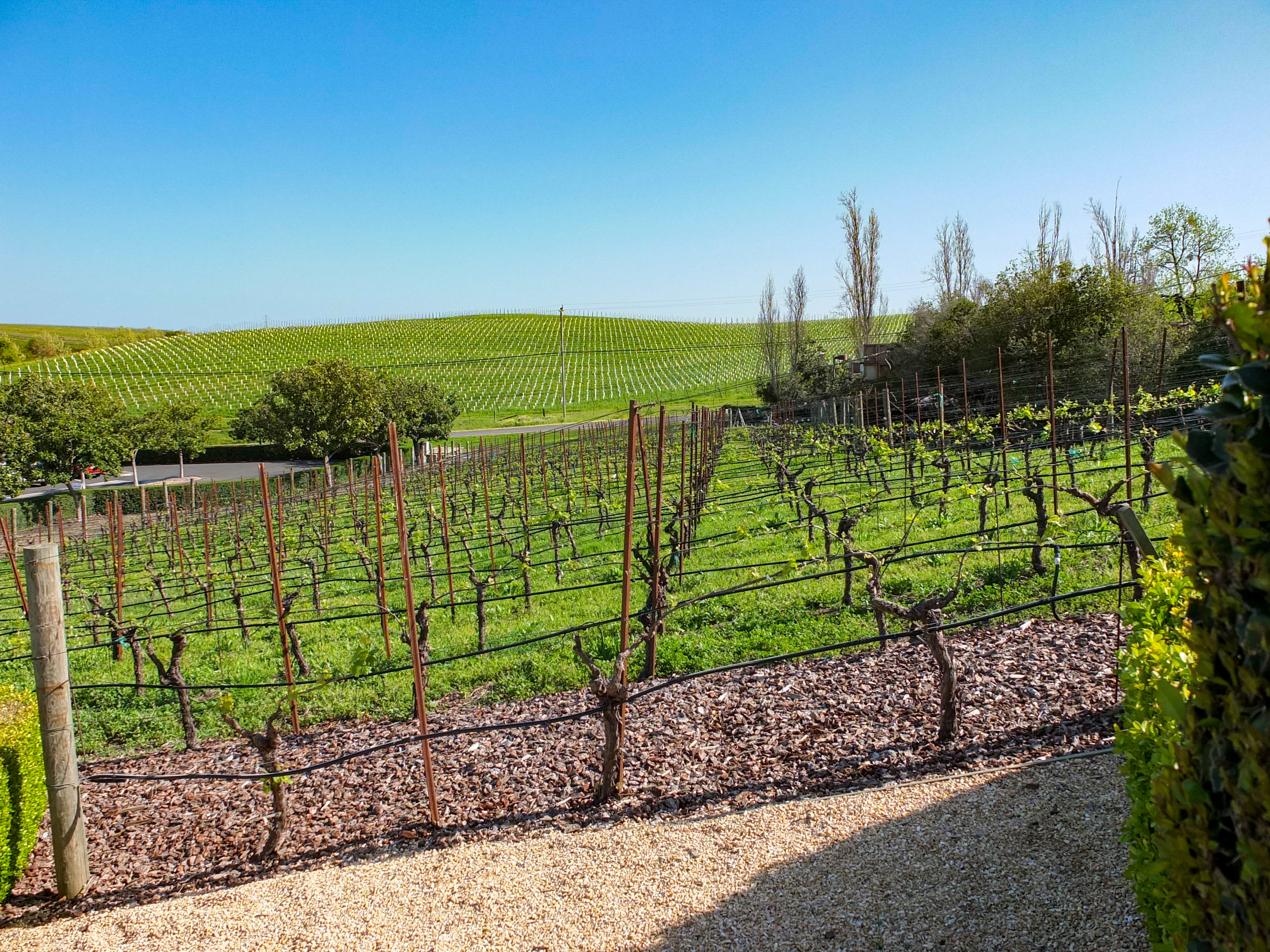
Domaine Carneros

Domaine Carneros is a winery founded in 1987 in the Los Carneros AVA. Domaine Carneros was established by Champagne Taittinger to create California sparkling wine using the Traditional Method. The business is a joint venture between Champagne Taittinger and Kobrand Corporation.

The château winery building is modeled after Taittinger's Château de la Marquetterie in the Champagne region.

The 138-acre (56 ha) estate is situated up a slope rising over San Francisco and San Pablo Bay, with an elevation of 120 feet (37 m) to 260 feet (79 m) above sea level.

Its CEO is Remi Cohen.

Its winemakers are Zak Miller and TJ Evans.
