= Joséphine Missoffe =

French politician (born 1973)

Member of the National Assembly for Paris's 14th constituency
- Incumbent
- Assumed office 22 October 2024
- Preceded by: Benjamin Haddad

Personal details
- Born: 24 September 1973 (age 52) Boulogne-Billancourt, France
- Party: Renaissance
- Parent: Ernest-Antoine Seillière (father)
- Relatives: Françoise de Panafieu (sister-in-law)

Joséphine Missoffe (French pronunciation: [ʒozefin misɔf]; née Seillière de Laborde, 24 September 1973) is a French politician who has represented the 14th constituency of Paris in the National Assembly since 2024. A member of Renaissance (RE), she was elected as Benjamin Haddad's substitute in 2022 and 2024; she took his seat upon his appointment to the government.

She is the daughter of entrepreneur and heir Ernest-Antoine Seillière and the sister-in-law of politician Françoise de Panafieu.
