= Confederation of European Business =

EU lobby group

- Abbreviation: BusinessEurope
- Formation: 28 February 1958; 68 years ago
- Location: Brussels, Belgium
- Region served: European Union
- President: Maciej Witucki
- Director General: Markus J. Beyrer
- Website: businesseurope.eu

The Confederation of European Business, shortened as BusinessEurope, is a lobby group representing enterprises of all sizes in the European Union (EU) and seven non-EU European countries. It represents 42 national business federations and employers' organizations. The current president of the confederation is Maciej Witucki, while the Director General is Markus J. Beyrer.

Based in Brussels and registered in Belgium as an Association internationale sans but lucratif, the confederation is officially recognised as a social partner at European level and involved in a range of economic and social decisions and cooperates with a number of stakeholders and business partners. It promotes the interests of corporate citizens to ensure that public policy supports the European economy. It is generally considered the strongest interest organisation in Brussels, and represents 20 million companies through its member trade associations in 36 European countries.

== History ==
The association was founded in 1958, first called UNICE (Union des Industries de la Communauté Européenne) and later changed its name to BusinessEurope in January 2007 during the presidency of Ernest-Antoine Seillière. In 2014, Unilever terminated its membership of BusinessEurope's Advisory and Support Group because it opposed the organisation's stance on carbon dioxide emissions.

=== Leadership ===
The association is led by a president, which has been held by the following persons:

- 1958–1961 Léon Bekaert
- 1961–1962 Georges Villiers
- 1962–1967 H. J. de Koster
- 1967–1971 Fritz Berg
- 1971–1975 Paul Huvelin (businessman)
- 1975–1980 Pol Provost
- 1981–1983 Guido Carli
- 1984–1986 Raymond Pennock
- 1986–1990 Karl Gustaf Ratjen
- 1990–1994 Carlos Ferrer Salat
- 1994–1998 François Perigot
- 1998–2003 Georges Jacobs
- 2003–2005 Jürgen Strube
- 2005–2009 Ernest-Antoine Seillière
- 2009–2013 Jürgen Thumann
- 2013–2018 Emma Marcegaglia
- 2018–2022 Pierre Gattaz
- 2022-2026 Fredrik Persson
- Since July 2026: Maciej Witucki.

BusinessEurope is administered by a director general. Markus J. Beyrer has held that position since 2013.

== Activities ==
The Confederation of European Business organises the biannual BusinessEurope Day in Brussels.

== Member organisations ==
Members in countries outside the European Union

Country	Organisation(s)
Austria	Federation of Austrian Industries
Belgium	Federation of Belgian Enterprises
Bulgaria	Bulgarian Industrial Association – Union of the Bulgarian Business
Cyprus	Cyprus Employers and Industrialists Federation (OEB)
Czech Republic	Confederation of Industry of the Czech Republic
Germany	Federation of German Industries
Germany	Confederation of German Employers' Associations
Denmark	Confederation of Danish Industries
Denmark	Confederation of Danish Employers
Estonia	Estonian Employers' Confederation
Finland	Confederation of Finnish Industries
France	Mouvement des Entreprises de France
Greece	Hellenic Federation of Enterprises
Croatia	Hrvatska Udruga Poslodavaca
Hungary	Confederation of Hungarian Employers and Industrialists
Ireland	Irish Business and Employers Confederation
Iceland	The Federation of Icelandic Industries
Iceland	Confederation of Icelandic Employers
Italy	General Confederation of Italian Industry
Lithuania	Lietuvos pramonininku konfederacija
Luxembourg	Business Federation Luxembourg
Latvia	Employers' Confederation of Latvia
Montenegro	Montenegrin Employers Federation
Malta	The Malta Chamber of Commerce Enterprise
Netherlands	Confederation of Netherlands Industry and Employers
Norway	Confederation of Norwegian Enterprise
Poland	Polish Confederation Lewiatan
Portugal	Confederação da Indústria Portuguesa
Romania	Concordia
Serbia	Unija poslodavaca Srbije
Slovenia	Association of Employers of Slovenia
Slovakia	National Union of Employers (Slovakia)
San Marino	Associazione Nazionale dell'Industria Sammarinese
Spain	Spanish Confederation of Employers' Organizations
Sweden	Confederation of Swedish Enterprise
Switzerland	Économiesuisse
Switzerland	Schweizerischer Arbeitgeberverband
Turkey	Turkish Industrialists' and Businessmen's Association (TÜSİAD)
Turkey	Turkish Confederation of Employer Associations
Ukraine	Federation of Employers of Ukraine
Ukraine	Union of Ukrainian Entrepreneurs
United Kingdom	Confederation of British Industry

== See also ==
- European Business Summit
- EuropeanIssuers
- European Trade Union Confederation

== Sources ==
- European Social Partners as recognised by the Treaty of Lisbon
- European Transparency Register
- RFI 20 May 2011
- Europolitique 21 January 2011
