= Lycée Voltaire (Paris) =

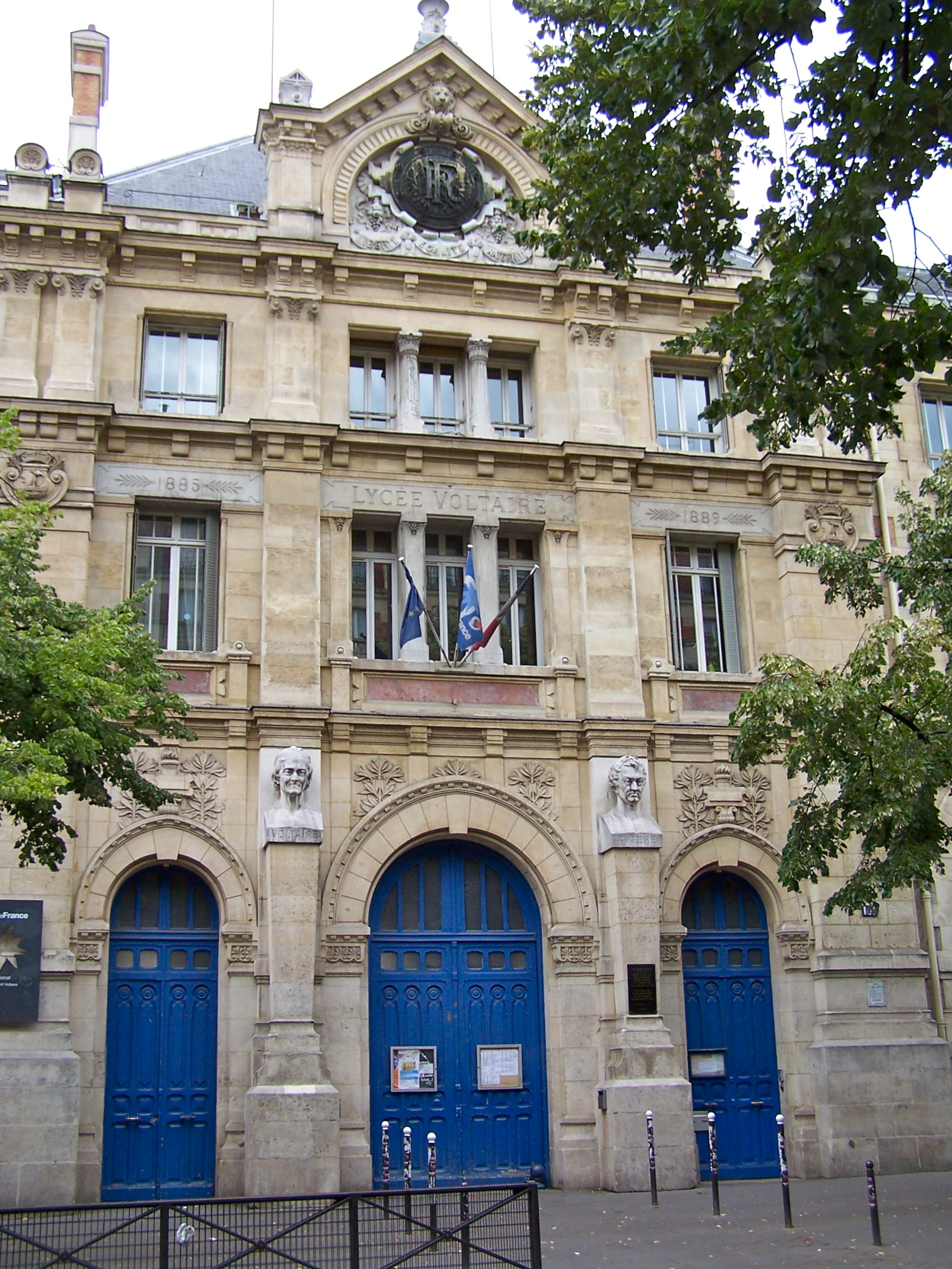
- School entrance

Location
- 101 avenue de la République 75011, Paris; France
- Coordinates: 48.863817°N 2.384961°E

Information
- Type: Secondary school
- Established: 1890; 135 years ago
- Website: lyc-voltaire.ac-paris.fr

The Lycée Voltaire is a secondary school in Paris, France, established in 1890.

== History ==
The Lycée Voltaire was the first lycée in the east of Paris, and was intended to supplement classical humanities with practical and scientific knowledge suitable for the needs of the neighborhood. The building was officially inaugurated on 13 July 1891 in a ceremony attended by Marie François Sadi Carnot, president of the Republic. For a long time it was the only lycée in the northeast of Paris. There were 152 students in the first year, 544 in 1904 and 792 in 1912. A major renovation was undertaken from 1992 to 2002. The lycée today is a public secondary school for general education and technology.

== Building ==
Eugène Train (1832–1903) was architect of the Lycée Voltaire, which was located on the Avenue de la République. Construction began in 1885. The school was designed to accommodate 1,200 pupils, of whom 500 were boarders. Construction was completed in September 1890. The cost was divided between the state and the city of Paris.

The buildings are arranged around a central courtyard, courtyards to the east and west, and to the north a courtyard for physical education and sports. Buildings included 47 classrooms and 17 studies, lecture rooms for physics (2), chemistry (2), history & geography (2). There is a collections room, drawing room, modeling workshops and a library. A screening room was equipped by M. Gaumont. The building includes four large apartments for senior staff and accommodation for 20 teachers and 20 domestic workers. The decorations of the building included metal and ceramics. A marble monument of Voltaire by Victor Ségoffin, meant for the Pantheon, now stands in the courtyard of the Lycee Voltaire.

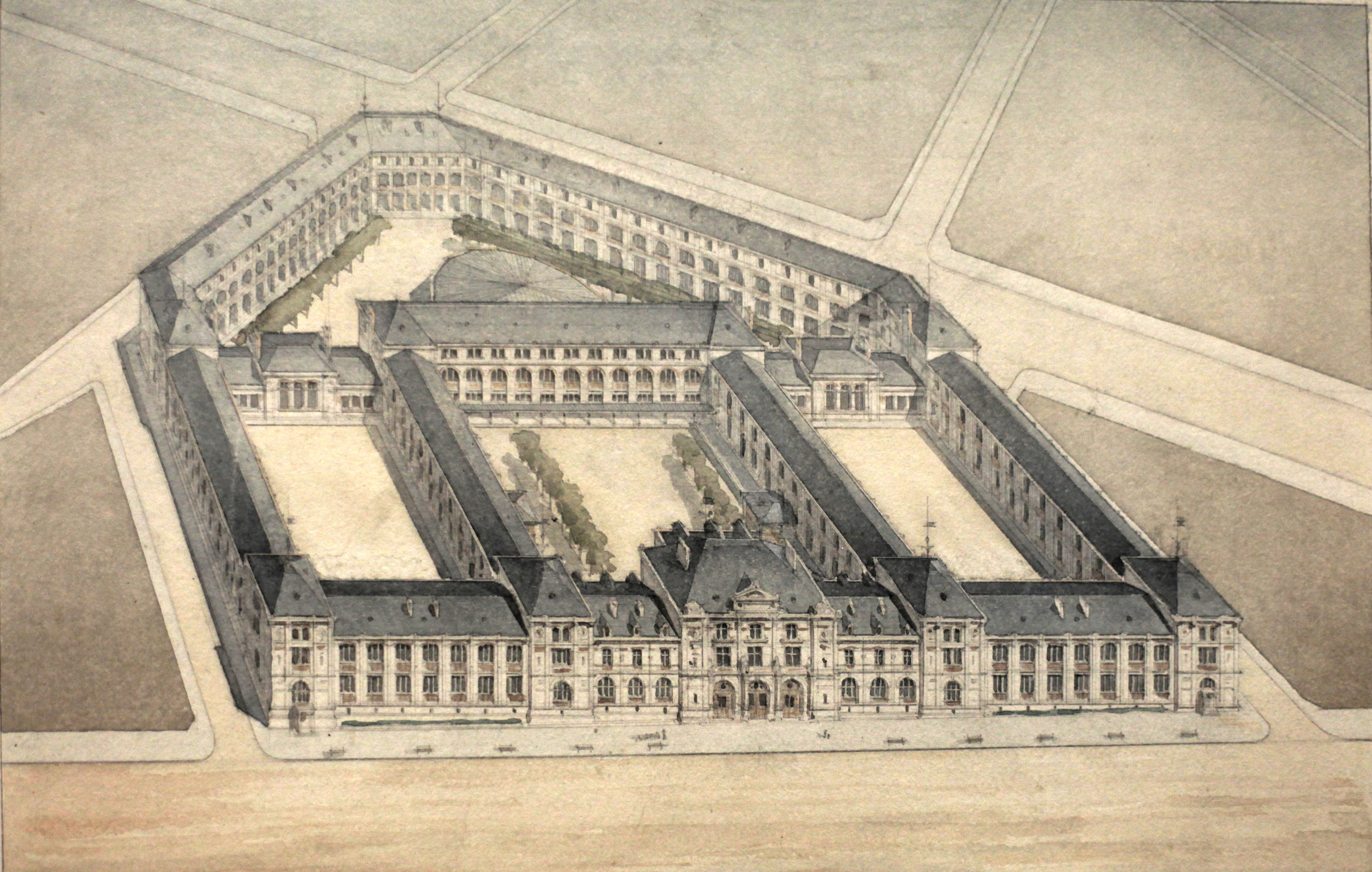
Drawing by Eugène Train

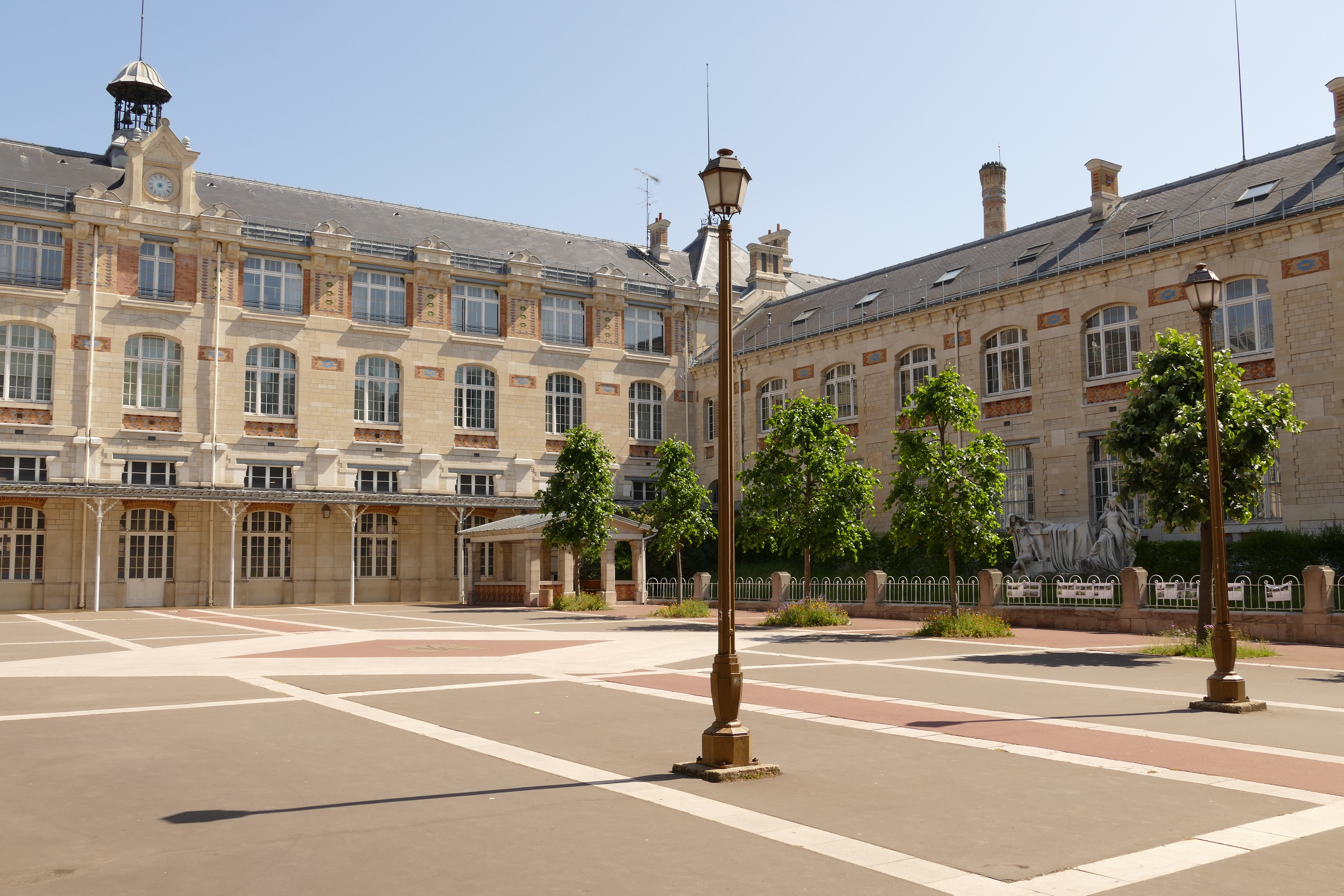
Cour d'honneur

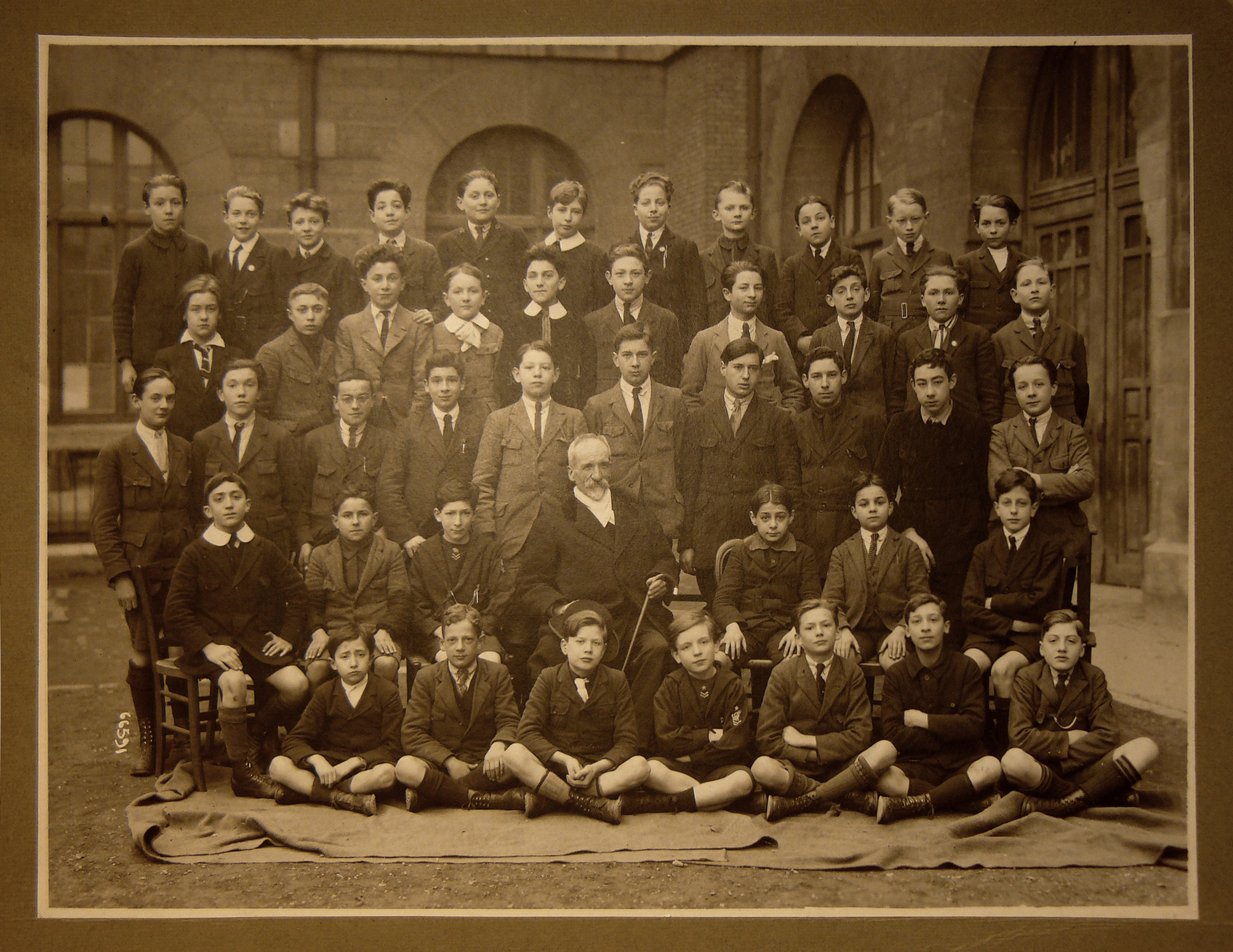
Class photo c. 1930

== Former pupils ==
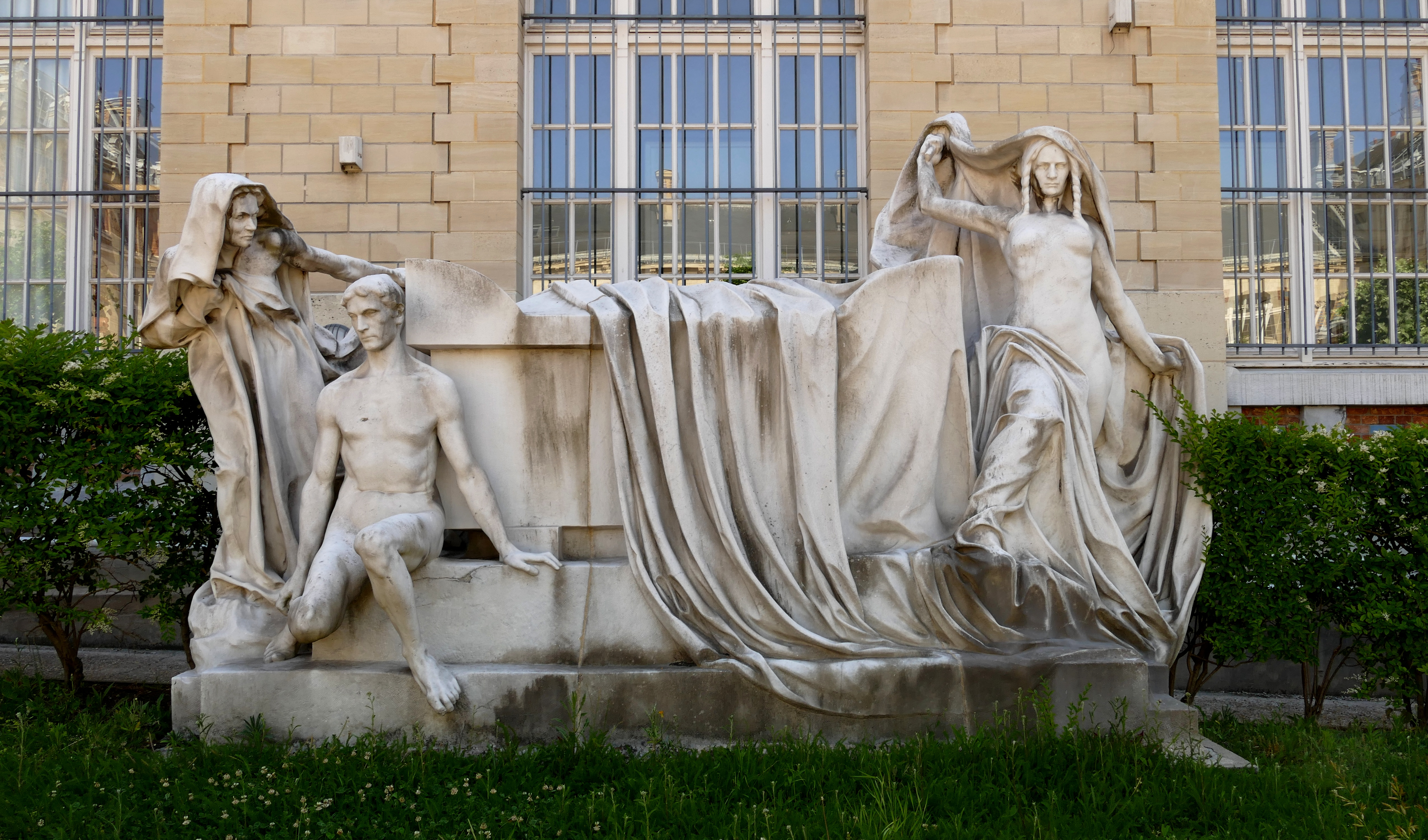
Marble monument to Voltaire by Victor Ségoffin in the cour d'honneur

- Octave Aubry (1881–1946), novelist and historian
- Yves Boisset (born 1939), film director
- Fernand Braudel (1902–85), historian
- Edgar Faure (1908–88), politician
- Serge Daney (1944 - 1992), film critic
- Alain-Fournier (1886–1914), author
- Henri Krasucki (1924–2003), trade-unionist
- Camille Le Tallec (1906–91), porcelain artist
- Marcel L'Herbier (1888–1979), filmmaker
- André Michel Lwoff (1902–94), microbiologist
- Aïssa Maïga (born 1975), actress
- Guy Marchand (born 1937), actor, musician and singer
- Jean Mermoz (1901–36), aviator
- Claude Miller (1942– 2012), filmmaker
- Gilbert Montagné (born 1951), musician
- Violette Nozière (1915–66), parricide
- Jacques Revaux (born 1940), songwriter
- Robinson Stévenin (born 1981), actor
- Sagamore Stévenin (born 1974), actor
- Alan Stivell (born 1944), musician
- Guy Stroumsa (born 1948), professor of comparative religion
- Pedro Winter (born 1975), music producer
- Julie Zenatti (born 1981), singer

== Former teachers ==
- Jean-Louis Bory (1919–79), writer, journalist and film critic
- Alain Krivine (born 1941), Trotskyist politician
- Albert Malet (1864–1915), historian
- Robert Mandrou (1921–84), historian
- Jules Marouzeau (1878–1964), philologist
- Émile Moselly (1870–1918), novelist.
- Étienne Weill-Raynal (1887–1982), historian

== Sources ==
- Froissart-Pezone, Rossella; Wittman, Richard (1999–2000). "The École Nationale des Arts Décoratifs in Paris Adapts to Meet the Twentieth Century". Studies in the Decorative Arts. 7 (1). University of Chicago Press on behalf of the Bard Graduate Center: 2–32. doi:10.1086/studdecoarts.7.1.40662721. JSTOR 40662721. S2CID 193108671.
- Letter from Paris (1889). The Builder.
- "Présentation du lycée Voltaire" (in French). Association Amicale du Lycée Voltaire de Paris (AALVP).
