= Octave Aubry =

French novelist and historian (1881–1946)

Octave Aubry (1 September 1881, Paris – 27 March 1946) was a French novelist and historian.

== Biography ==
Aubry, Ernest Seillière, Jean Tharaud, René Grousset and Robert d'Harcourt were the five members of the Académie française elected on 1 February 1946, to replace the many vacancies left by the Nazi occupation of Europe. Aubry himself succeeded cardinal Alfred Baudrillart in seat 8, but died a month and a half after his election, the day before he was due to present his reception speech to the Commission de lecture.

== Education ==
Aubry obtained secondary education from the Lycée Voltaire and the Lycee Charlemagne. After high school Aubry pursued history, reading the great historians of the time like Albert Sorel, Albert Vandal and Anatole Leroy-Beaulieu. His interest in history took him to many places. He went on long trips to England, Spain and France. He then began to write for a living. His first published work was a collection of poems, entitled Of Love, Irony, Pity. He also published an essay called The Indulgence and the Law.

== Works ==
Aubry's fascination with history led to several historical novels. These included Louis XVII, Bonaparte and Josephine, The Coup d'état of Brumaire, The Lost King, Marie Walewska, The Bed King and Gaspard Hauser. He also authored numerous scholarly books on the great historical figures of 19th century. These were Napoleon III, Empress Eugenie, A History of the Second Empire, King of Rome, The Private Life of Napoleon and French Revolution. One of his most famous works was The Journey to St. Helena, a book to write for which he spent several weeks on the island.

Auby was the series editor for Flammarion's Hier et Aujourd-hui book series.

== Works ==
- De l'amour, de l'ironie, de la pitié, poems (1904)
- Le Roman de l'énergie individuelle : la face d'airain (1906)
- De la loi de pardon en matière pénale, doctoral thesis (1908)
- L'Homme sur la cime (1912)
- Le Chemin de Damas (1912)
- Sœur Anne (1912)
- Le Roi perdu retrouvé : Louis XVII (1924)
- Le Grand Amour caché de Napoléon : Marie Walewska (1925)
- Le Lit du roi : Casanova, Louis XV et Mlle de Romans (1926)
- Le Roman de Napoléon (1927)
- Bonaparte et Joséphine (1927)
- Brelan de femmes, ou Le Coup d'État de Brumaire (1927)
- Couleur de sang (1928)
- L'Orphelin de l'Europe, Gaspar Hauser (1928)
- Napoléon III (1929)
- L'Espagne (2 volumes, 1929-1930)
- Marie Walewska (1930)
- Le Roi perdu (1931)
- L'Impératrice Eugénie (1931)
- L'Impératrice Eugénie et sa cour (1932)
- Le Roi de Rome (1932)
- La Trahison de Marie-Louise (1932)
- Les Dernières Années de l'impératrice Eugénie (1933)
- La Jeunesse du Roi de Rome (1933)
- Une tragédie de palais (Gaspard Hauser) (1934)
- Histoire de France. III, Révolution et Empire (1934)
- Sainte-Hélène (2 volumes, 1935)
- L'Aiglon prisonnier (1935)
- Le « Ménage » de Napoléon; Napoléon, Talma et Mlle George; Marie-Louise, duchesse de Parme; Pèlerinage à Sainte-Hélène; Les Anglais et Napoléon (1936)
- La Mort de l'Aiglon (1936)
- Le Règne de Napoléon III (1937)
- Le Second Empire (1938)
- Napoléon et l'amour (1938)
- Vie privée de Napoléon (1939)
- Les Pages immortelles de Napoléon (1941)
- L'Aiglon, des Tuileries aux Invalides (1941)
- La Révolution française (2 volumes, 1942-1945)
