= Pierre Taittinger =

French politician (1887-1965)

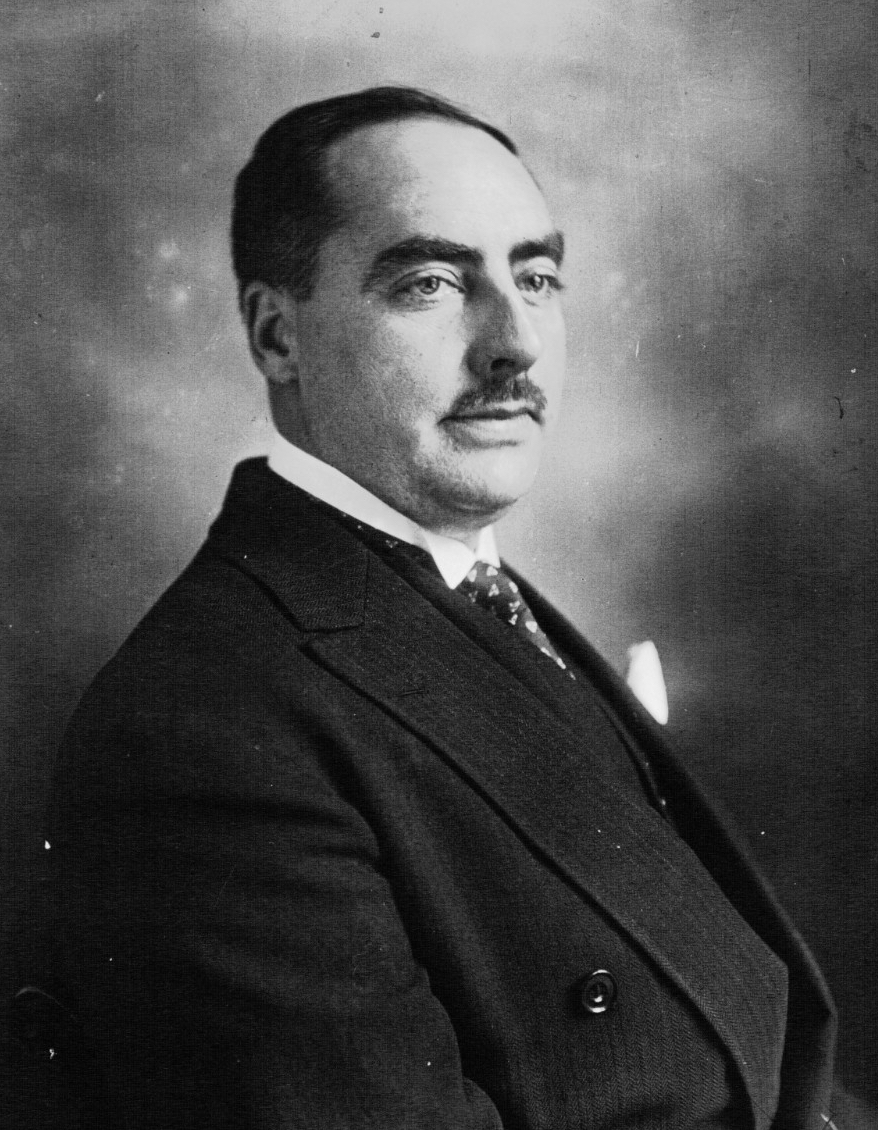
- Taittinger in 1929

Member of the National Assembly
- In office 1919–1942

Personal details
- Born: 4 October 1887 18th arrondissement of Paris, France
- Died: 22 January 1965 (aged 77) 16th arrondissement of Paris, France
- Children: Guy; Pierre-Christian; Jean; Claude
- Education: Collège Stanislas

Pierre-Charles Taittinger (4 October 1887 – 22 January 1965) was the founder of the Taittinger champagne house and chairman of the municipal council of Paris in 1943–1944 during the German occupation of France, in which position he played a role during the Liberation of Paris.

== Personal life ==
Born in Paris, Pierre Taittinger's family were originally from Lorraine and had left the Moselle département when it had been annexed by the German Empire in 1871 in order to remain French citizens. An officer in the cavalry during the First World War, Taittinger received several citations and was decorated as a Commander of the National Order of the Legion of Honour. In 1919 he was elected deputy of the Charente-Inférieure département.

Taittinger married Gabrielle Guillet (1893–1924) in 1917. In 1925 he married Anne-Marie Mailly (1887–1986). He died in Paris in 1965 and was buried in Reims at the cimetière du Nord with his third son François (1921–1960) who had run the Taittinger champagne house between 1945 and 1960.

His son Michel, a French military hero and second lieutenant in the 66th African Artillery Regiment of the French Army, died on 15 June 1940 at the age of 20 in the city of Saint Parres-aux-Tertres, near Troyes in the Champagne region. He had held off for five hours a Panzer division of General von Kleist with his fellow soldiers, many of whom were of Moroccan, Algerian and West African units. Michel had been a student in the French military academy École Polytechnique.

Another of Taittinger's sons, Jean Taittinger, was deputy mayor of Reims from 1959 to 1977, Secretary of State for Budget from 1971 to 1973 and State Minister of Justice from 1973 to 1974 in the administration of Georges Pompidou.

== Political career ==
He was mayor of Saint-Georges-des-Coteaux, in the same département, from 1919 until 1937, and again from 1953 until his death in 1965. In 1924 he was elected deputy of the 1st arrondissement of Paris, and held this mandate until 1940.

In 1924, Taittinger founded the Jeunesses patriotes (Patriotic Youths), a fascist group, recruited mostly from university students and financed by industrialists. Taittinger took inspiration for the group's creation in the Boulangist Ligue des patriotes. Taittinger was also deeply influenced by the Bonapartist movement, during which he was a member of the French Parliament. In the end of the 1920s, the Jeunesses patriotes became one of the far-right's major anti-Communist movements, challenging the Action française and the Croix de Feu under Colonel de Larocque.

In 1937, he was elected to the municipal council of Paris and to the departmental council of the Seine. In March 1940, he was elevated to the rank of Commander in the Order of the Légion d'honneur. On 10 July 1940, Taittinger voted as a member of the Chamber of Deputies in favour of granting the cabinet presided by Marshal Philippe Pétain authority to draw up a new constitution, thereby effectively ending the French Third Republic and establishing Vichy France. He became president of the municipal council of Paris in May 1943, as the Germans occupied the city, and held this position until the Liberation of Paris in August 1944.

On August 17, 1944, concerned that explosives were being placed at strategic points around Paris by the Germans, Taittinger met with the German military governor Dietrich von Choltitz. On being told that Choltitz intended to slow up as much as possible the Allied advance, Taittinger, along with the Swedish consul general Raoul Nordling, attempted to persuade Choltitz not to destroy Paris. As the Allies rolled into the Paris Basin, Pierre Taittinger made an incredible change from collaborator to a member of the resistance. After the war, he published a book called ...et Paris ne fut pas détruit ("...and Paris was not destroyed") which was awarded a prize by the French Academy. In 1954 he became honorary deputy (a title given to ex-members of the French National Assembly).

== Champagne business ==
Taittinger, who, before the First World War, had run a business involved in the distribution and export of champagne with one of his brothers-in-law, acquired in 1931 the venerable champagne firm of Forest-Fourneaux, founded in 1734 by Jacques Fourneaux and the third oldest champagne house in existence. The next year he bought the Château de la Marquetterie and its champagne estate, near Épernay, which he had first visited during the war while stationed in the area. In the following years, he bought hundreds of acres of vineyards in the finest producing areas of Champagne, taking advantage of the cheap price of land caused by the 1930s economic crisis.

Forest-Fourneaux, renamed Ets Taittinger Mailly & Cie, was transformed by Taittinger into a world-famous champagne house, Champagne Taittinger, operating from the cellars of the Saint-Nicaise Abbey in Reims. Pierre Taittinger restored the House of the Counts of Champagne in the center of Reims, damaged by the Germans during the First World War, which had been the residence of the Counts of Champagne during the Middle Ages, now the property of Champagne Taittinger. He bequeathed his estate of La Grainetière, on the Isle of Rhé, to the city of Reims, which has become a summer camp for the children of Reims.
