= Laurence Parisot =

French businesswoman (born 1959)

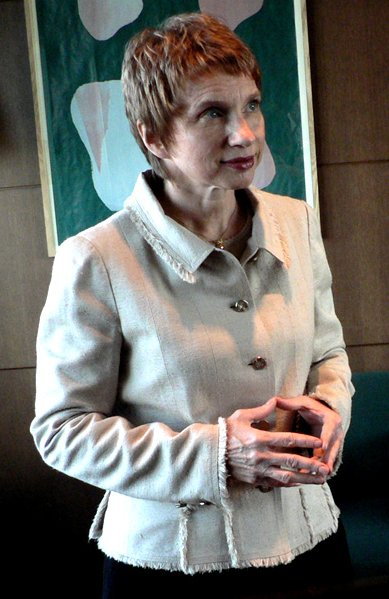

President of the Movement of French Enterprises
- In office 2005–2013
- Preceded by: Ernest-Antoine Seillière
- Succeeded by: Pierre Gattaz

Personal details
- Born: 31 August 1959 (age 67) Luxeuil-les-Bains, France
- Education: Nancy University; Sciences Po

Laurence Parisot (French: [lɔʁɑ̃s paʁizo]; born 31 August 1959 in Luxeuil-les-Bains, Haute-Saône) is a French businesswoman who was head of the French MEDEF employers' union from 2005 until 2013. She also directs the IFOP poll institute. She became the 276th wealthiest French person after she inherited the Parisot group (first furnishing retail group in France). She is vice-president of La Fondation Droit Animal, Éthique et Science from 2020 to 2025 and succeeded Louis Schweitzer as president of the Foundation in June 2025.

== Family ==
Her father and grandfather Jacques Parisot (who set up the business) led the Parisot group, an unquoted furnishing retail company. She is single and has no children.

== Education ==
Parisot studied public law in Nancy University and then entered Sciences Po. In 1986, she was nominated director of the Louis Harris Institute poll.

== Career ==
Since 1990, Parisot has been chief executive of the IFOP poll institute after she bought 75% of its capital. She has also been a member of BNP Paribas board since 1990.

=== Head of the MEDEF ===
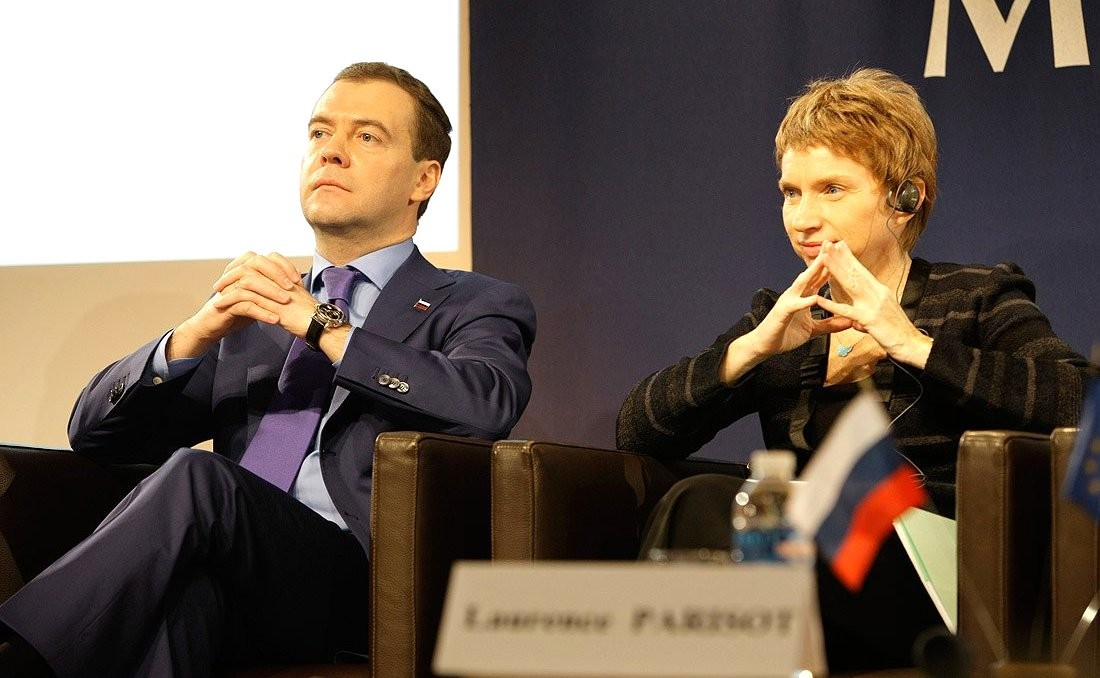
Parisot with Russian president Dmitry Medvedev whilst the latter was in Paris on a state visit on 2 March 2010

In 2003, Parisot entered the MEDEF executive board. On 5 July 2005 she beat two other candidates in a vote to replace Ernest-Antoine Seillière. At the time, she was the youngest ever head of the business lobby and the first one to run a service company. During her time in office, Parisot declared that she intended to fight against unemployment and put “enterprise at the center of French society”. She added that she would work very hard to push French MPs to adopt more liberal labour legislation.

On 6 November 2007, Parisot was among the guests invited to the state dinner hosted by U.S. president George W. Bush in honor of President Nicolas Sarkozy at the White House.

In 2013, Parisot lost an internal battle to alter the group's statutes and extend her eight-year term; instead, she was replaced with Pierre Gattaz.

=== Later career ===
In 2014, Parisot declared her interest in succeeding Henri Proglio as CEO of French state utility Électricité de France (EDF); instead, the position went to Jean-Bernard Lévy. In 2018, she was appointed by U.S. bank Citigroup as chairwoman and managing director of its French unit.

== Other activities ==
=== Corporate boards ===
- Électricité de France (EDF), Member of Board of Directors (since 2014)
- BNP Paribas, Member of the Board of Directors (2006–2018)
- Ernst & Young, Member of the Advisory Board
- Michelin, Independent Member of Board of Directors (2005–2015)
- Coface, Independent Member of Board of Directors (2007–2014)
- Havas, Member of Board of Directors (2005–2006)
- Disneyland Paris, Independent Member of Board of Directors (2000–2006)

=== Non-profit organizations ===
- Institut de la Finance Durable (IFD), Member of the Board of Directors (since 2022)
- European Council on Foreign Relations (ECFR), Member
- International Crisis Group (ICG), Board of Trustees (since 2012)
- Open Society Foundations, Member of the European Advisory Board

== Recognition ==
Parisot was awarded the Ordre national du Mérite.

== Personal life ==
Parisot is single and lives in Paris.
