= Georges Jacobs de Hagen =

Belgian businessman (born 1940)

- Born: 1940 (age 85–86)
- Education: PhD degree in Law from Universite Catholique de Louvain; MA degree in economics at Berkeley
- Occupation: Businessman

Georges, Count Jacobs de Hagen (born 1940) is a leading Belgian businessman.

Jacobs obtained a PhD degree in Law (1962) and a licentiate in economics (1964) from the Universite Catholique de Louvain (Belgium). He also obtained a MA degree in economics at the University of California (Berkeley, U.S., 1965).

Jacobs started his career as an economist with the International Monetary Fund in Washington, D.C. in 1966. In 1970, he joined the UCB Group and has been chairman of the Executive Committee of UCB since 1987 until the end of 2004. Since January 2005 he is chairman of the board of directors of UCB Group and chairman of the board of directors of Delhaize Group. Georges Jacobs also serves on the board of directors of UCB, Belgacom, Bekaert, Spadel and SN Brussels Airlines. He is an honorary chairman of UNICE (Union of Industrial and Employers' Confederations of Europe) and a member of the Management Committee and honorary chairman of the Federation of Belgian Companies.

Jacobs is chairman of the Belgo-Luxemburg-Polish chamber of commerce, and a member of the board of the American Chamber of Commerce and the British Chamber of Commerce in Belgium. He is also member of the board of Générale de Banque, IBM Belgium, Spadel S.A., L.I.V. N.V. (Groupe Carmeuse).

== Sources ==
- Georges Jacobs
- Speech before UNICE (2001)
