= Ernest Seillière =

French writer, journalist and critic

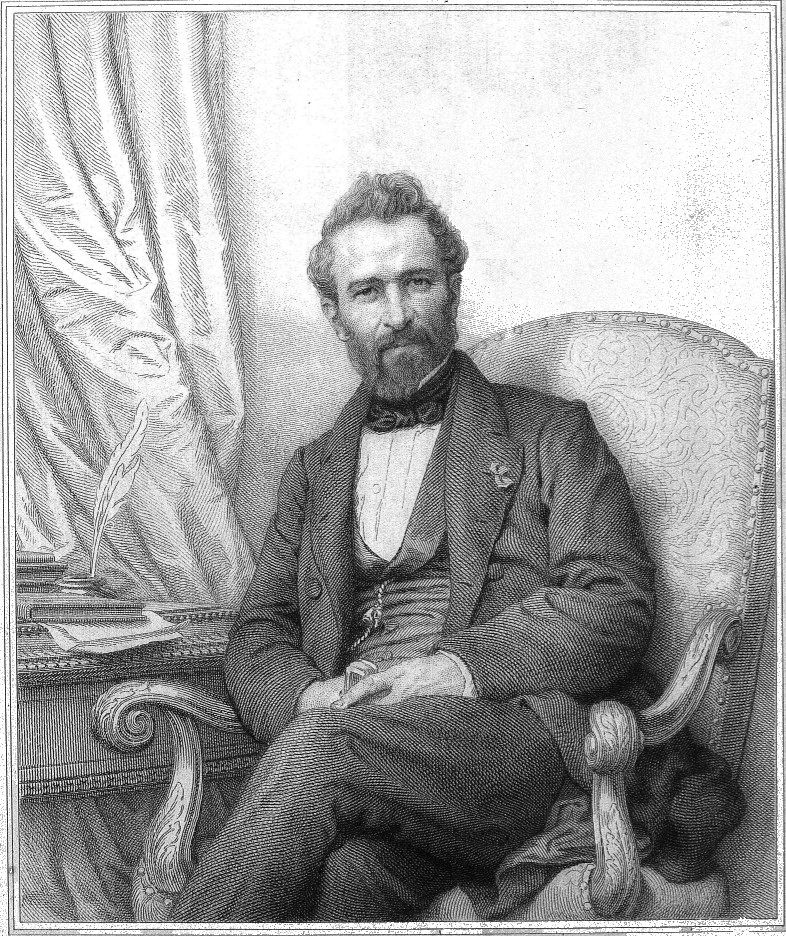
- Born: Ernest Antoine Aimé Léon Seillière de Laborde; 1 January 1866; 8th arrondissement of Paris
- Died: 15 March 1955 (aged 89); 16th arrondissement of Paris
- Burial place: Passy Cemetery
- Citizenship: French
- Education: École Polytechnique Collège Stanislas
- Occupations: Journalist, literary critic
- Employer(s): Academy of Moral and Political Sciences (1914-1955); Académie française (1946-1955); Comité national de l'estampe
- Spouse: Germaine Demachy
- Children: Jean Seillière de Laborde
- Father: Edgar-Aimé Seillière
- Family: Seillière family

The Baron Ernest-Antoine Seillière (1 January 1866 – 15 March 1955) was a French writer, journalist and critic.

== Biography ==
Seillière was born in Paris, the son of Aimé Seillière and Marie de Laborde. He studied at the École polytechnique. He was elected a member of the Académie des sciences morales et politiques in 1914.

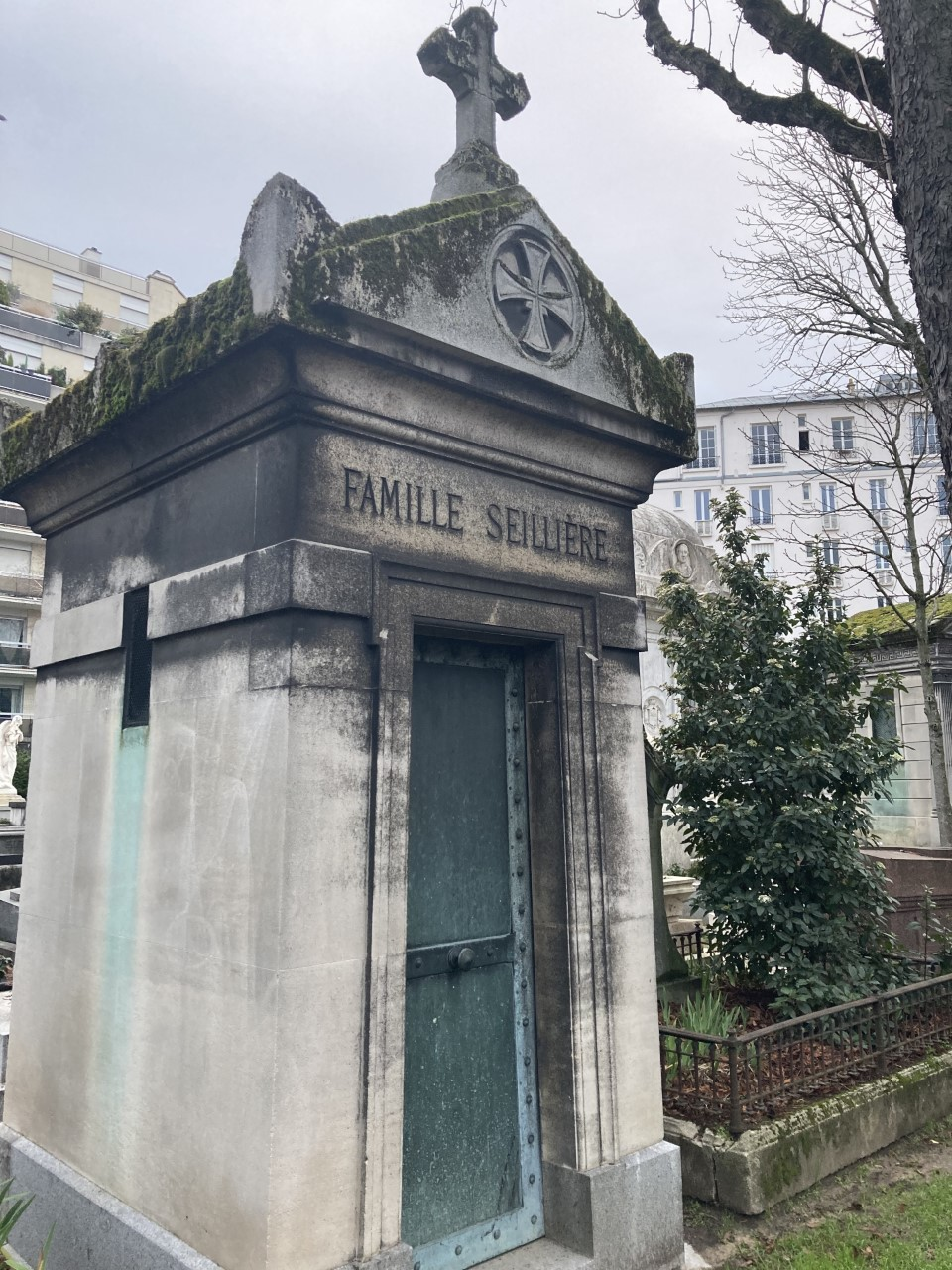
Grave in Passy Cemetery (Paris).

Aged 80, Seillière was (with Jean Tharaud, René Grousset, Octave Aubry and Robert d'Harcourt) one of the five members of the Académie française elected on 1 February 1946, to replace the many vacancies left by the Nazi occupation of Europe. He was received on 23 May 1946 by Édouard Le Roy, succeeding Henri Lavedan.

He married Germaine Demachy, daughter of the president of the Banque de Paris et des Pays Bas, and was the grandfather of Ernest-Antoine Seillière.

== Works ==
- Étude sur Ferdinand Lassalle, fondateur du Parti Socialiste Allemand (1897)
- Littérature et Morale dans le Parti Socialiste Allemand (1898)
- La Philosophie de l'impérialisme, 4 volumes: I. Le Comte de Gobineau et l'Aryanisme historique (1903), II. Apollon ou Dionysos? Étude sur Nietzsche (1905), III. L'Impérialisme démocratique (1907), IV. Le Mal romantique - Essai sur l'impérialisme irrationnel (1908)
- Une Tragédie d'Amour au Temps du Romantisme (1909)
- Les Mystiques du Néoromantisme - Karl Marx, Tolstoï, les Pangermanistes (1910)
- Barbey d'Aurevilly (1910)
- Introduction à la Philosophie de l'Impérialisme (1911)
- Schopenhauer (1912)
- Mysticisme et Domination (1913)
- Le Romantisme des Réalistes - Gustave Flaubert (1914)
- L'Avenir de la Philosophie Bergsonienne (1917)
- Un artisan d'énergie française, Pierre de Coubertin (1917)
- Émile Zola (1923)
- Psychoanalyse freudienne ou psychologie impérialiste (1928)
- Romantisme et démocratie romantique (1930)
- Émile Faguet historien des idées (1938)
- Le Naturisme de Montaigne et autres essais (1938)
- Un précurseur du national-socialisme. L'actualité de Carlyle (1939)

== Bibliography ==
- Seillière, Jean : Ernest Seillière - 1866 1966 - Centenaire De La Naissance. 1966.
- Cazanove, Laetitia de : Ernest Seillière (1866-1955), théoricien de l'impérialisme et père du fascisme ?, Université de Paris X Nanterre, 2001 (Dir. Didier Musiedlak), 218 p.
