= Jean Gandois =

French businessman (1930–2020)

- Born: 7 May 1930; Nieul, Haute-Vienne
- Died: 7 August 2020 (aged 90)
- Education: École polytechnique

Jean Gandois, AM (7 May 1930 – 7 August 2020) was a French businessman.

== Early life ==
He was born in Nieul, Haute-Vienne. He was a student at the École polytechnique, where he graduated in 1949 as an engineer of bridges and road construction.

== Career ==
From 1954 to 1960 he worked on public projects in Guinea, as an expert for the road programs of Brazil and Peru. In 1961, he returned to France and worked for the Wendel Group. After various positions, in 1972, he became general manager of Sacilor, then Chairman and managing Director of Sollac. In 1976, he started working at the Rhône-Poulenc, eventually becoming Chief Executive Officer. He left the group in 1982 and until 1986 he worked as an international consultant. In 1986, he became Chairman and managing Director of the Pechiney Group. He left them in 1994 to take the chair of the National Council of French Employers (CNPF, old name of Medef). Feeling betrayed by the government, he resigned in 1997 after the socialist government asseda law for the 35 -ourswork week. From 1987 to 1999 ,he worked as a crisis manager for Cockerill Sambre. He was a president of the board of trustees of Suez. He was a member of the Belgian business club Cercle de Lorraine.

In 1995, he was appointed an Honorary Member of the Order of Australia (AM), "for service to Australian-French relations, particularly in the business sphere". He died at Sologne, aged 90.
