= Georges Mesmin =

French politician (1926–2019)

Mayor of the 16th arrondissement of Paris
- In office 13 March 1983 – 19 March 1989
- Preceded by: None
- Succeeded by: Pierre-Christian Taittinger

Member of the National Assembly for Paris's 14th constituency
- In office 23 June 1988 – 21 April 1997
- Preceded by: New constituency
- Succeeded by: Claude Goasguen

Personal details
- Born: 15 November 1926 Juvisy-sur-Orge, France
- Died: 25 April 2019 (aged 92) 16th arrondissement of Paris, France
- Party: UDF
- Education: Sciences Po, ÉNA
- Profession: Finance General Inspector

Georges Mesmin (15 November 1926 – 25 April 2019) was a French politician who served as member of the National Assembly and mayor of the 16th arrondissement of Paris between 1983 and 1989.
