= Mouvement des Entreprises de France =

Employers' association in France

Mouvement des entreprises de France
- Formation: 1945 (CNPF), 1998 (MEDEF)
- Type: Employer federation
- Headquarters: 55 avenue Bosquet, 75007 Paris
- Location: Paris, France
- Leader: Patrick Martin
- Website: www.medef.fr

The Mouvement des entreprises de France (MEDEF), or the Movement of the Enterprises of France, is the largest employer federation in France. Established in 1998, it replaced the Conseil national du patronat français (CNPF), or the "National Council of the French Employers", which was founded in 1946.

== History ==
Vice-president of the Conseil national du patronat français (CNPF) and member of its executive board from 1988 to 1997, Ernest-Antoine Seillière became its president, replacing Denis Kessler. It was under Seillière's presidency that the organization changed its name to MEDEF.

The presidential election took place on July 3, 2013, to choose the successor to Laurence Parisot, as the latter was reaching the end of the second term permitted by the bylaws.

== Operations ==
MEDEF has more than 750,000 member firms, 90 percent of them being small and medium enterprises (SMEs) with fewer than 50 employees. MEDEF is engaged in lobbying at local, regional, national, and EU-wide levels.

Every year, MEDEF International organises a number of delegations of French business leaders with tangible projects to targeted countries, especially developing countries. MEDEF espouses “sustainable development”, raising companies’ awareness to the fact that environmental protection can also feature among their competitive advantages.

== Leadership ==
- 1998–2005: Ernest-Antoine Seillière
- 2005–2013: Laurence Parisot
- 2013–2018: Pierre Gattaz
- 2018–2023: Geoffroy Roux de Bézieux
- 2023–present: Patrick Martin

== See also ==
- Union of Industrial and Employers' Confederations of Europe (UNICE)
- Union des industries et métiers de la métallurgie (UIMM)
- Lisbon Agenda
