= Florentin Seillière =

French businessman and banker

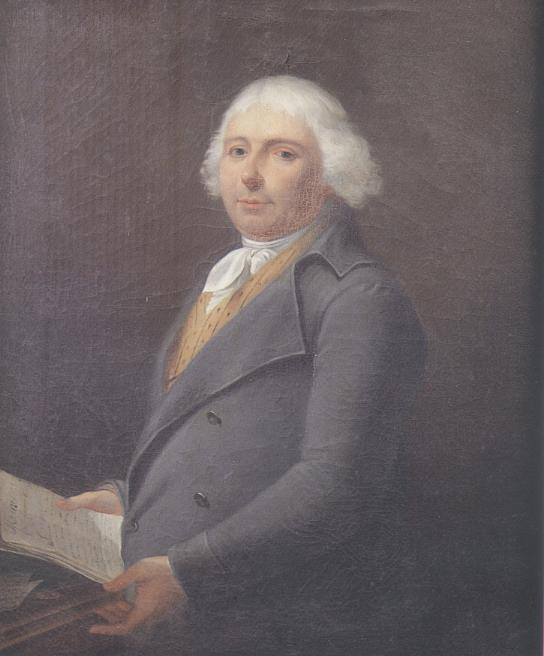
- Born: 3 July 1744; Saint-Mihiel, Meuse, France
- Died: 4 February 1825 (aged 80)
- Occupations: Businessman, banker

Florentin Seillière (3 July 1744 – 4 February 1825) was a French businessman and banker. He and his brother made their fortune in the wool trade, and in supplying fabric to the army in the period before, during and after the French Revolution. They used their capital to support the Lorraine iron industry. Seillière was made a baron by Napoleon, and this was confirmed and made hereditary after the Bourbon Restoration. He left a large fortune when he died.

== Family ==
Florentin Seillière was born on 3 July 1744 in Saint-Mihiel, Meuse. He was the son of François Seillière (1707–1749) and Marie-Anne Sellier. His father, who was descended from officials at the court of Lorraine, had become a wool merchant in Saint-Mihiel. The Seillières were a prominent Catholic family. The family name had been Sellier (Saddler), then Seillier, and finally Seillière. In 1769 Florentin married Jeanne Chevalier (1750–1802). Their children were Nicolas (1770–1844), Germain Auguste (1775–1803), François (1782–1843) and Claude Florentin (died 1808).

== Career ==
Florentin and his brother Aimé (1742–1793) expanded the family business to become suppliers of clothing and guns to the army. In 1776 the Seillières (Aimé and Florentin) created a cloth company at Pierrepont, Meurthe-et-Moselle. They were successful in the wool trade with Germany, and their lavoir at Pierrepont soon became an important supplier of cloth for the army. In 1787 Florentin moved to Nancy where he obtained letters-patent of bourgeoisie from consular judges of Lorraine and Barrois. Later he was named héraut d'armes (herald), an honorary title that conferred nobility which would be inherited by his descendants.

The Wendels lost their forge and foundry at Hayange during the French Revolution. In 1789 the Seillières obtained the lease of the royal forge of Ruelle, which had been managed by Ignace de Wendel (1741–1795). Florentin Seillière helped the Wendels buy back their Hayange forge in 1804. In 1808 he was chosen by the emperor Napoleon as head of the board of saltworks of the east. Seillière supported Jean François Marin in his purchase of a large foundry in Moyeuvre. In 1811 François de Wendel signed two bonds of 120,000 and 180,000 from Seillière in order to buy the Moyeuvre foundry from Marin.

Florentin's son Nicolas created a branch of the bank in Paris in 1798, and specialized in recovering public debts held by companies supplying the army. Florentin's other son François-Alexandre joined his brother in Paris in 1805, and in 1808 founded a bank at the Rue Le Peletier in the 9th arrondissement. François-Alexandre was an entrepreneur more than a banker, and became very involved in the textile industry. Florentin's granddaughter became countess of Sommariva.

Florentin Seillière was a member of the electoral council of the Meuse and a knight of the Legion of Honour. He was created a baron of the Empire in January 1814 on promise of institution of majorat. He was confirmed as baron by letters patent of King Louis XVIII in 1815. His title was made hereditary in the form of majorat in 1817. He died on 4 February 1825 at the age of 80. He left a fortune of 5.5 million francs.

== Sources ==
- Bourset, Madeleine (1994), Casimir Perier: un prince financier au temps du romantisme (in French), Publications de la Sorbonne, ISBN 978-2-85944-249-1
- Bruguière, Michel (January–March 1970), "Finance et noblesse : L'entrée des financiers dans la noblesse d'empire", Annales historiques de la Révolution française (in French), 42e Année (199, La France à l'époque napoléonienne), Armand Colin: 161–170, doi:10.3406/ahrf.1970.3898, JSTOR 41914032
- Capefigue (1858), "French Financial Operations", Bentley's Miscellany, Richard Bentley
- Fontaine, Jean-Paul (29 January 2014), La Bibliothèque du baron Achille Seillière (in French)
- James, Harold (2009-06-30), Family Capitalism: Wendels, Haniels, Falcks, and the Continental European Model, Harvard University Press, ISBN 978-0-674-03909-4
- Landes, David S. (1999-05-17), The Wealth and Poverty of Nations: Why Some Are So Rich and Some So Poor, W. W. Norton, ISBN 978-0-393-06981-5
- Pascallet, E (1844), Revue générale, biographique, historique, etc. Le Biographe universel et l'historien [ed. by E. Pascallet]. (in French)
- Pierfit, "Florentin, 1° baron SEILLIÈRE", geneanet
- Szramkiewicz, Romuald (1974), Les régents et censeurs de la Banque de France nommés sous le Consulat et l'Empire (in French), Librairie Droz, ISBN 978-2-600-03373-2
