= Étienne Weill-Raynal =

- Born: Étienne, Marc, Isaac Weill-Raynal; 9 December 1887; Paris, France
- Died: 14 July 1982 (aged 94); Paris, France
- Education: École Normale Supérieure
- Occupations: Historian, resistant, journalist, politician

Étienne Weill-Raynal (1887–1982) was a French historian, resistant, journalist and Socialist politician. As a scholar following World War I, he specialized in the subject of reparations. When World War II began, he was dismissed from his teaching position and sent to the Drancy internment camp because he was Jewish. He escaped from the internment camp, and joined the National Council of the French Resistance. After the war, he wrote articles in socialist newspapers and served as a member of the National Assembly from 1950 to 1951, representing Oise.

== Early life ==
Étienne Weill-Raynal was born on 9 December 1887 in the 9th arrondissement of Paris, France. His father was a supporter of the republic. His mother was a niece of Léon Gambetta, who served as the 45th Prime Minister of France (1881-1882). He was Jewish.

He graduated from the École Normale Supérieure. He received the agrégation in History in 1910. After his military service, he received a bachelor's degree in Law. He served in the French Army during World War I.

== Career ==
Weill-Raynal started his career as a high school teacher in Laon. He then taught at the Lycée Pierre-Corneille in Rouen, followed by the Lycée Voltaire and the Lycée Louis-le-Grand.

Weill-Raynal joined the French Section of the Workers' International, later replaced by the modern-day Socialist Party. He also became a member of the Human Rights League and the Grand Orient de France, a freemason organization. He ran unsuccessfully for the National Assembly in 1924, 1932, 1936, and 1937.

In 1938, he started writing a PhD thesis about World War I reparations. At the outset of World War II, he was dismissed from his teaching position because he was Jewish. He was sent to the Drancy internment camp in 1940, but escaped. In 1941, he became acquainted with Jean Moulin and joined the National Council of the Resistance of the French Resistance.

After the war, Weill-Raynal defended his PhD thesis at the University of Paris on 14 April 1945. In 1947, a summary of his thesis was published as La politique française des réparations by Nouvelles Éditions latines. It was reviewed by Maurice Baumont in the journal Revue historique. By 1969, American Professor Sally Marks called him "the leading authority on reparations."

Weill-Raynal served as a member of the National Assembly from 1950 to 1951, representing Oise. He ran again in 1951, but lost to Jean Legendre. Meanwhile, he wrote for two socialist newspapers, Le Populaire and Nord Matin: Journal de la Démocratie Socialiste. In 1954 he became the director of La Revue Socialiste. He returned to politics, serving as an advisor to Guy Mollet until 1963.

== Death ==
Weill-Raynal died on 14 July 1982, in the 16th arrondissement of Paris.
