= Taittinger =

French Champagne house

Coordinates: 49.24429°N 4.04618°E

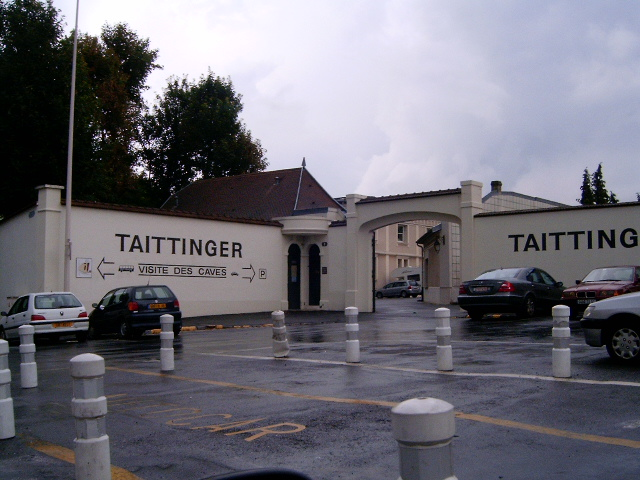
Taittinger caves

Taittinger (pronounced [tɛ.tɛ̃.ʒe], tet-ang-zhey) is a French wine family who are famous producers of Champagne. The estate is currently headed by Vitalie Taittinger, who is the daughter of Pierre-Emmanuel Taittinger (born 1953), a member of the consultative committee of the Banque de France. Its diversified holdings included Champagne Taittinger, Société du Louvre and Concorde Hotels, whose flagship is the famed Hotel de Crillon on the Place de la Concorde in Paris, France as well as the Loire Valley wine-producing firm of Bouvet-Ladubay, and a partnership in Domaine Carneros in California. All these holdings were sold to Starwood Capital in 2005. The family re-acquired the house of Champagne Taittinger in 2006 after securing financial support from the Crédit Agricole bank and also the backing of trade organisations.

== Champagne production ==
Founded in 1734, the Taittinger Champagne house is based in Reims. The flagship wines of the house are the Comtes de Champagne (composed of 100% Chardonnay) and Comtes de Champagne Rosé (70% Pinot noir and 30% Chardonnay). In 2017, Taittinger planted its first vines in England, near a village in Kent, for its venture into English sparkling wine. The first bottles were released in April 2025 under the name Domaine Evremond.

== History ==
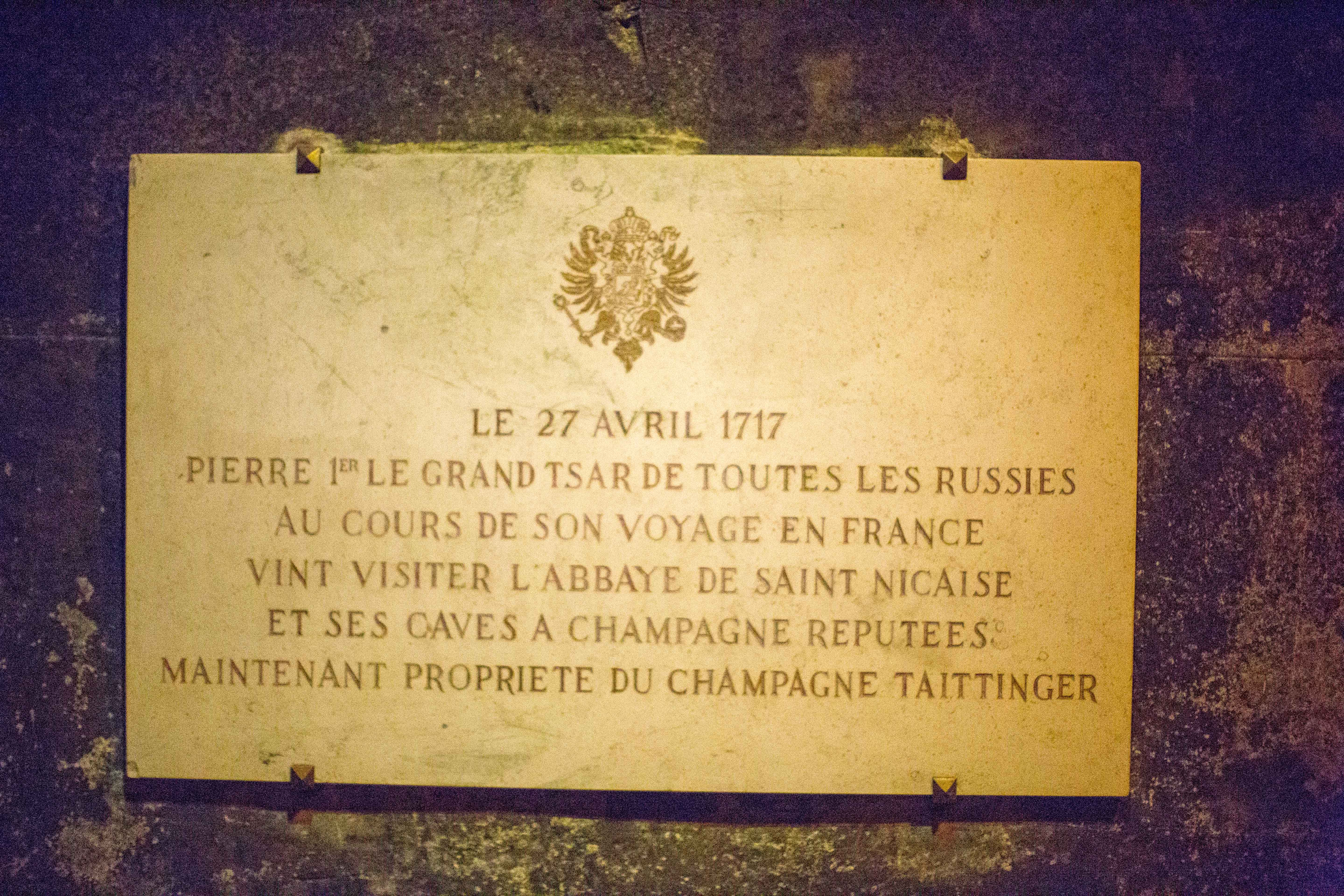
A marker in the cave

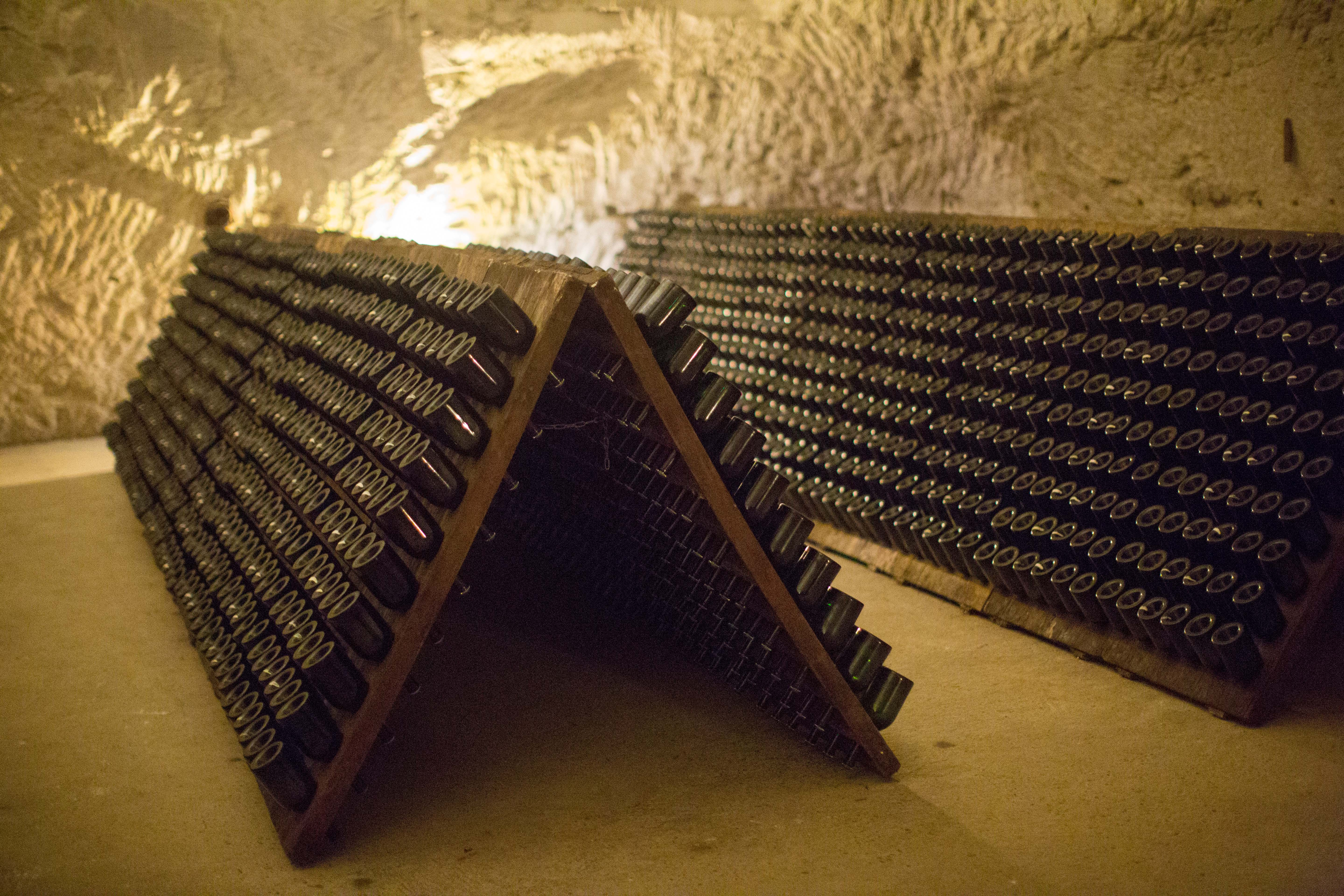
Bottles in the cave

In 1734, Jacques Fourneaux established a wine-business in Champagne and worked closely with the Benedictine abbeys which, at that time, owned the finest vineyards in the region. After the First World War, the wine house was moved to a large mansion on the Rue de Tambour in which Theobald I of Navarre (1201–1253) had lived. A long-standing legend held that it was he who brought the Chardonnay grape from Cyprus on returning from a crusade in the Middle Ages. This claim has been disproved by using genetic analysis, ascertained at the University of California, Davis.

The Taittingers were a family of wine merchants who, in 1870, moved to the Paris region from the Lorraine in order to retain their French citizenship after the Franco-Prussian War and the Treaty of Frankfurt (1871).

In 1932, Pierre Taittinger bought the Château de la Marquetterie from the wine house of Forest-Fourneaux. It had been used as a command post during World War I and he had been laid up there after suffering a heart attack during combat. The vineyards of the château had been planted with Chardonnay and Pinot noir since the 18th century. This property had been developed by Brother Jean Oudart, a Benedictine monk, one of the founding fathers of champagne wine, and later it had belonged to the writer Jacques Cazotte.

From 1945 to 1960 the business was run by Pierre's third son François. Under his direction, the Taittinger cellars were established in the Abbey of Saint-Nicaise, built in the thirteenth century in Gallo-Roman chalk pits dating from the fourth century. After François' death in an accident, his brother Claude took over and directed the business from 1960 to 2005. It was during this time that Taittinger became a champagne house of world renown.

Claude Taittinger retired in 2005, and, along with the majority of 38 family heirs, decided to sell Groupe Taittinger, including the Champagne house. Taittinger was sold in July 2005 by the Taittinger family, along with its subsidiary, Société du Louvre, to the US private investment firm Starwood Capital Group. Those in the profession (Champagne houses, wine-producers, cooperatives, distributors and customers) proposed that the objectives of short-term profitability, or even medium term, at any price, advocated by the then current managers of the business, were not compatible with the production of Champagne wine of quality, which takes time, trust and a large delegation of authority to the masters of the cellar. In addition, the arrival of investors completely foreign to the culture of Champagne could result in a major breakdown of the equilibrium of the industry.

Finally, on 31 May 2006, the Northeast Regional Bank of the Crédit Agricole, in collaboration with Pierre-Emmanuel Taittinger, bought the business for 660 million euros. The area covers 288.84 hectares of vineyards and has 12 to 13 million bottles in stock. The Château de la Marquetterie and its cellars were part of the overall purchase. The Starwood group retained some of the hotels, including luxury hotels Crillon, Lutetia and Martinez, and the hotel chains Campanile and Kyriad.

In 2017, it was announced that Taittinger had become the first champagne house to plant vines in the UK. Champagne Taittinger entered into a joint venture with UK wine agents Hatch Mansfield and in 2015 bought up land in Chilham, Kent, to plant 40 hectares of vines over the next three years.

In October 2019 it was announced that Vitalie Taittinger would become president from January 1, 2020 and her brother Clovis Taittinger would become general manager, in charge of sales and marketing. Vitalie had been working for the company for 12 years and was director of marketing and communications.

== Partnerships ==
Taittinger was named the official Champagne of the FIFA World Cub and FIFA Women's World Cup in 2014. The partnership agreement was extended through the end of 2030, as announced by FIFA in June, 2024.

In addition to soccer, Taittinger is an active partner in several other sports. The Champagne house began a partnership with AFC Wimbledon in 2025, being poured in all hospitality lounges. Taittinger also is involved in motor sports, as a sponsor of the Haas Formula One (F1) team beginning in 2021 as well as the official Champagne of Formula E.

In the spring of 2025, Delta Airlines began serving Taittinger Champagne in its Delta One cabin on international flights, as part of the airline's 100-year anniversary.

Also in spring 2025, Holland America Line announced a collaboration with Taittinger Champagne, serving the wine as part of its sailaway celebrations.

Taittinger is also involved with sailing and has a long standing relationship (since 2008) with the Royal Solent Yacht Club on the Isle of Wight as the title sponsor of the Taittinger RSYC Regatta.

== See also ==
- List of Champagne houses
