= Conseil national du patronat français =

The Conseil national du patronat français (CNPF; National Council of French Employers) was an employers' organization created in December 1945 on request of the Provisional Government of the French Republic, which wanted a representative organization of all of the employers.

== Origins ==
On 27 July 1944 the Free French government in Algiers annulled the Vichy decrees, dissolved the Peasant Corporation (Corporation paysanne) and reestablished all the syndicates of 1939 apart from the Confédération générale du patronat français (CGPF), which represented employers. The Centre des jeunes patrons (CJP) helped organize the CNPF in 1944, as did various leading employers with modern and civic-minded views. Henri Lafond worked with Pierre Ricard and Henri Davezac to form the CNPF. Georges Villiers was the first president.

== History ==
A division soon appeared between those such as Lafond who felt employers deserved certain rights, which should be regulated by law, and those who were opposed to any diminution of the absolute authority of the patron. The latter group included Marcel Meunier (1893–1971), a declared paternalist who became head of the CNPF social commission. Under the initiative of Ernest-Antoine Seillière, the CNPF transformed itself in 1998 into the MEDEF (Mouvement des Entreprises de France).

== Sources ==
- "Chronologie : histoire des relations du travail depuis la loi Le Chapelier de 1791", Vie Publique, Direction de l'Information Légale et Administrative, archived from the original on 2011-01-13
- Mahl, R., "Henri LAFOND (1894–1963)", Annales des Mines (in French)
- Zølner, Mette (2009), Young Business Leaders: Between Utility and Utopia, Peter Lang, ISBN 978-90-5201-541-5
