= Patrick Trémège =

French politician (1954–2026)

Deputy of the French National Assembly for Paris's 9th constituency
- In office 19 June 1995 – 21 April 1997
- Preceded by: Anne-Marie Couderc
- Succeeded by: Jean-Marie Le Guen

Member of the Regional Council of Île-de-France
- In office 21 March 1998 – 28 March 2004

Member of the Council of Paris
- In office 18 March 1983 – 3 July 2020

Personal details
- Born: 14 May 1954 Majunga, French Madagascar
- Died: 11 March 2026 (aged 71)
- Party: UDF; UMP; LR

Patrick Trémège (French: [patʁˈik tʁemˈɛʒ]; 14 May 1954 – 11 March 2026) was a French politician of the Union for French Democracy (UDF), the Union for a Popular Movement (UMP), and The Republicans (LR).

Trémège was a longtime councillor of Paris, serving from 1983 to 2020, and was also a member of the Regional Council of Île-de-France from 1998 to 2004. From 1995 to 1997, he was a deputy of the National Assembly from Paris's 9th constituency. He unsuccessfully ran for the Senate in 2017. In 2018, he was implicated in an investigation by Le Canard enchaîné for participating in trips organized by the Syndicat interdépartemental pour l'assainissement de l'agglomération parisienne.

Trémège died on 11 March 2026, at the age of 71.
