= Le Siècle (think tank) =

French elite social club

Le Siècle (French pronunciation: [l(ə) sjɛkl]; lit. 'The Century') is an elite transpartisan social club in France which meets once a month for dinner at the French Automobile Club in Paris's Place de la Concorde. Membership in Le Siècle "symbolizes the French nomenklatura" and includes France's top intellectuals, politicians, chief executives, journalists, and artists; since the 1970s, one-third to half of all French government ministers were members of Le Siècle, regardless of political affiliation or party membership.

== History ==
Le Siècle was founded in 1944 by Georges Bérard-Quélin, a journalist and Freemason. The small group of the 1940s and 1950s eventually expanded to include major politicians across the political spectrum, from François Mitterrand, who was a close associate of Bérard-Quélin, to Georges Pompidou via Pierre Mendès France. When a similar think tank called the Saint-Simon Foundation dissolved in 1999, many of its former members joined Le Siècle. Former CFDT Secretary General Nicole Notat has served as president of Le Siècle; not only is she the first woman to serve as president, she was also the first woman to lead a trade union in France.

== Membership ==
Membership in Le Siècle "symbolizes the French nomenklatura" and includes France's top intellectuals, politicians, chief executives, journalists, and artists. In fact, between one-third and a half of all French government ministers were members of Le Siècle since the 1970s, regardless of political affiliation or party membership. That percentage peaked at 72% under Prime Minister Édouard Balladur (1993–1995). French journalist and writer Emmanuel Ratier wrote in 1996 that the club's membership controls 90% of French GDP.

According to a 2011 article in Le Monde diplomatique, the members of Le Siècle are predominantly:

- Male (85%)
- Over 55 years old (80%)
- The sons of captains of industry, high-ranking public servants, or senior liberal professionals (55%)
- Graduates of the Institute of Political Studies (50%) and the École nationale d'administration (40%)
- From families with highly qualified engineers and links to significant business interests (25%)

There are 580 members, subject to change every year, and 160 guests.

=== List of members ===
- Claude Bébéar, former CEO of AXA.
- Thierry Breton, CEO of Atos, former minister of economy, finance, and industry (2005−2007).
- Emmanuel Chain, former TV presenter on M6.
- Jean-Marie Colombani, former editor-in-chief of Le Monde (1994−2007).
- Jean-François Copé, president of the Union for a Popular Movement; member of the French National Assembly (2002−present); Mayor of Meaux (1995−2002; 2005−present); former Minister of the Budget (2005−2007).
- Michèle Cotta, first female member in 1983; political journalist.
- Anne-Marie Couderc, CEO of Presstalis.
- Rachida Dati, Member of the European Parliament and mayor of the 7th arrondissement of Paris; former Minister of justice (2007−2009).
- Renaud Denoix de Saint Marc, member of the Constitutional Council of France (2007−present).
- Olivier Duhamel, vice-president of Le Siècle (2010−present); professor at the Institut d'Études Politiques de Paris; former Socialist Member of the European Parliament (1997−2004).
- Laurent Fabius, former prime minister (1984−1986).
- François Fillon, prime minister (2007−2012); former minister of National Education (2004−2005); former minister of social affairs (2002−2004).
- Claude Imbert, founding editor of Le Point.
- Odile Jacob, publisher.
- Denis Jeambar, journalist.
- Laurent Joffrin former editor-in-chief of Libération (2006−2011).
- Lionel Jospin, former prime minister (1997−2002), former minister of National Education (1988−1992); former minister of sport (1988−1991).
- Serge July, founding editor of Libération.
- Denis Kessler, CEO of Scor, former president of Le Siècle (2007−2010).
- Étienne Lacour, secretary general of Le Siècle; editor-in-chief of the Société Générale de Presse.
- Maurice Lévy, CEO of Publicis.
- Henri Loyrette, vice-president of Le Siècle (2010−present); director of the Louvre Museum (2001−present).
- Nicole Notat, president of Le Siècle (2010−present); CEO of Vigeo; former secretary general of the CFDT.
- Michel Pébereau, CEO of BNP Paribas.
- Patrick Poivre d'Arvor, newscaster on TF1.
- Alain de Pouzilhac, former CEO of Havas.
- David Pujadas, TV presenter on France 2.
- Jean-Pierre Raffarin, member of the French Senate; former prime minister (2002−2005).
- Edouard de Rothschild.
- Nicolas Sarkozy, French president (2007−2012).
- Louis Schweitzer, former CEO of Renault.
- Dominique Strauss-Kahn, former managing director of the International Monetary Fund (2007−2011).
- Marc Tessier, treasurer of Le Siècle (2010−present); former chairman of France Télévisions.
- Philippe Villin, former chairman of Le Figaro and France Soir.
- Gérard Worms, former CEO of N M Rothschild & Sons.
