= Sandrine Rousseau =

French economist and politician

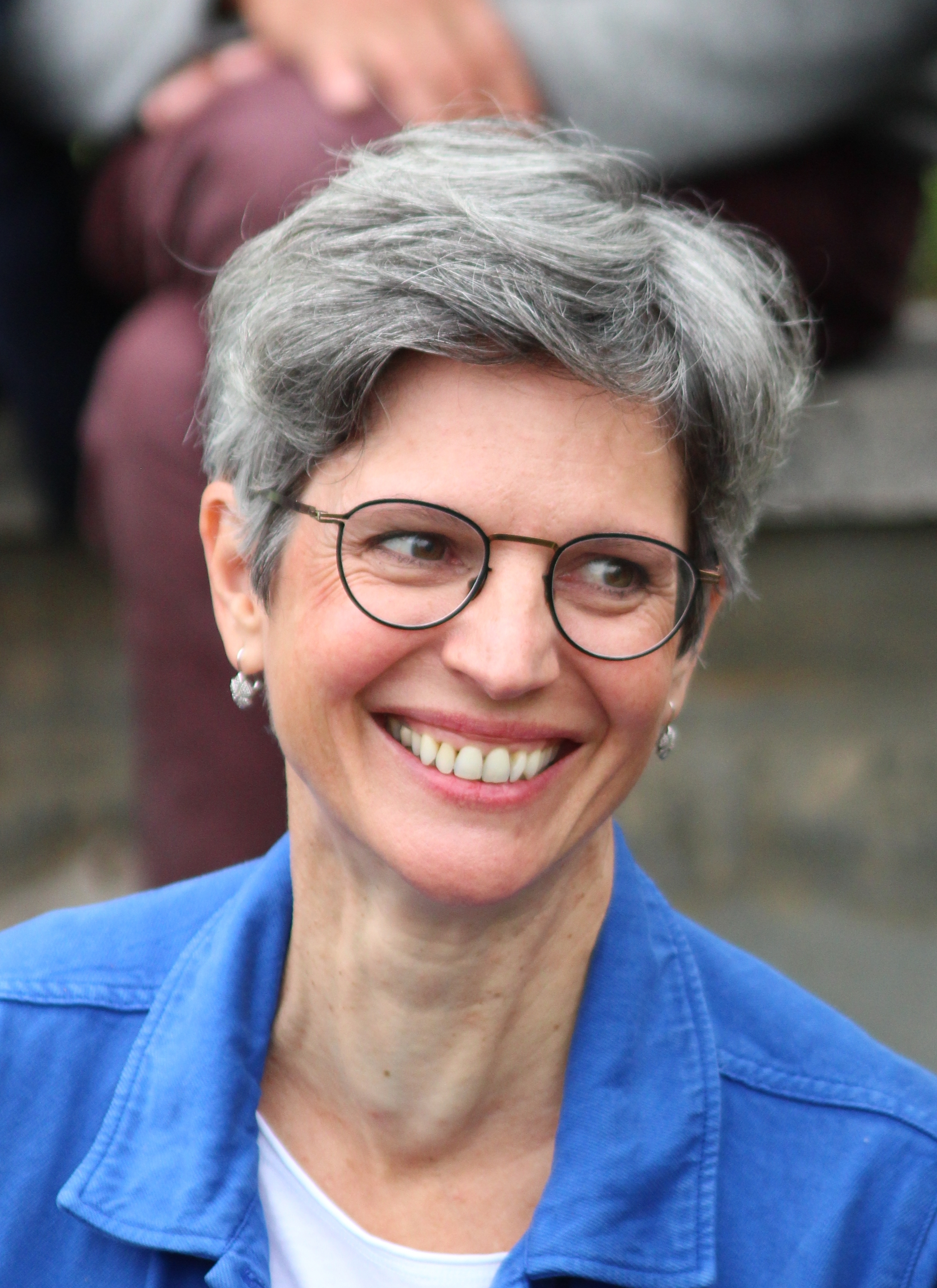
- Rousseau in 2021

Member of the National Assembly for Paris's 9th constituency
- Incumbent
- Assumed office 21 June 2022
- Preceded by: Buon Tan

Personal details
- Born: 8 March 1972 (age 54) Maisons-Alfort, France
- Party: Europe Ecology – The Greens (until 2017; since 2020)
- Spouse: François-Xavier Devetter (divorced)
- Children: 3
- Education: University of Poitiers; University of Lille

Sandrine Rousseau (French pronunciation: [sɑ̃dʁin ʁuso]; born 8 March 1972) is a French economist and politician who has represented the 9th constituency of Paris in the National Assembly since 2022. Member of Europe Ecology – The Greens (EELV), she has been widely seen as a figurehead of France's MeToo movement against sexual violence, and describes herself as an ecofeminist.

Rousseau previously served as a vice-president of the University of Lille.

== Early life ==
Rousseau was raised in Nieul-sur-Mer, France, where her father Yves Rousseau was mayor from 2001 to 2008.

== Political career ==
Rousseau became a candidate in the 2010 French regional elections for the Nord-Pas-de-Calais region, in third position on the Nord list. Following a merger of the left-wing lists, she was elected in the second round on the united list led by Daniel Percheron. She was appointed vice-president of the Regional Council of Nord-Pas-de-Calais, in charge of Research and Higher Education.

From 2011, Rousseau was part of the EELV national leadership, under chairwoman Cécile Duflot.

In 2016, Rousseau was one of several female politicians – including Isabelle Attard, Elen Debost and Annie Lahmer – who made headlines for accusing Green party colleague and MP Denis Baupin of sexual harassment. In 2022, she suggested in a TV interview that her colleague Julien Bayou had exhibited “behavior which could break women’s psychological health” and said that Bayou’s former partner had later attempted suicide; the Green Party’s parliamentary group subsequently suspended Bayou from his role as the group’s co-chair, and he later stepped down as secretary as well.

In March 2020, Rousseau was elected president of the Conférence permanente des chargés(e)s de mission égalité et diversité (CPED), which is composed of ninety-four public institutions of higher education and research around equality and diversity policies.

In 2021, Rousseau was a candidate for the open primary vote organized by Europe Ecology – The Greens for the 2022 French presidential election. She qualified for the second round but lost to Yannick Jadot. During the campaign, she was criticized for being too absent at her university post by students and colleagues at Lille University, who also complained about her lack of political engagement on subjects related to the university. She later joined Jadot’s campaign team but, by March 2022, was asked to leave again after she had expressed strong criticism of the campaign strategy.

During the 2022 French legislative election, Rousseau was elected deputy to the National Assembly for Paris's 9th constituency, as a member of the New Ecological and Social People's Union. In parliament, she has since been a member of the Committee on Social Affairs.

In March 2022 she sparked controversy by proposing that the law make non-participation in household chores a misdemeanor. In August 2022, France’s National Hunting Federation (FNC) filed a complaint against Rousseau after she had stated "that one femicide out of four [was] linked to a hunting weapon."

In 2022 she criticised meat consumption as contributor to climate change, French Communist Party leader Fabien Roussel strongly defended meat consumption as part of French gastronomy.

On 12 November 2023, she took part in the March for the Republic and Against Antisemitism in Paris in response to the rise of anti-Semitism in France since the start of the Gaza war.

== Publications ==
- 2022: Par-delà l'androcène, with Adélaïde Bon et Sandrine Roudaut, Éditions du Seuil
