= Paris's 10th constituency =

Constituency of the National Assembly of France

10th constituency of Paris
- inline Constituency of the National Assembly of France

- Paris, showing its post 2012 legislative constituencies
- Deputy: Rodrigo Arenas; LFI
- Department: Paris
- Registered voters: 67,347

The 10th constituency of Paris (French: Dixième circonscription de Paris) is a French legislative constituency in the Paris département (75). Like the other 576 French constituencies, it elects one MP using the two-round system. Its boundaries were heavily redrawn in 1988 and 2012.

10th constituency of Paris
- inline Constituency of the National Assembly of France

- Paris, showing its legislative constituencies between 1988 and 2012
- Member: constituency abolished, 2012
- Department: Paris

Map of Paris constituencies in 1981.

== Historic representation ==
Election	Member	Party	Source
1958	Jacques Malleville	UNR	
1962	Jacques Malleville	UNR	
1967	Jacques Chambaz	PCF	
1968	Claude Martin	UDR	
1973	Jacques Chambaz	PCF	
1978	Claude Martin	RPR	
1981	Ghislaine Toutain	PS	
1986	Proportional representation - no election by constituency		
1988	Jacques Toubon	RPR	
1993	Jacques Toubon	RPR	
1993	Claude Goasguen	RPR	
1995	Jacques Toubon	RPR	
1995	Lionel Assouad	RPR	
1997	Serge Blisko	PS	
2002	Serge Blisko	PS	
2007	Serge Blisko	PS	
2012	Denis Baupin	EELV	
2017	Anne-Christine Lang	LREM	
2022	Rodrigo Arenas	LFI	
2024	Rodrigo Arenas	LFI	

== Election results ==
=== 2024 ===
Candidate	Party	Alliance	First round			Second round		
Candidate	Party	Alliance	Votes	%	+/–	Votes	%	+/–
Rodrigo Arenas	LFI	NFP	25,216	50.66	+5.51			
Benjamin Djiane	RE	ENS	11,918	23.94	-5.37			
Agnès Pageard	RN		5,670	11.39	+5.88			
Patrick Viry	LR		2,965	5.96	+0.84			
Yann Wehrling	DVE		1,324	2.66	N/A			
Alexia Ostyn	UDI		640	1.29	-2.17			
Roger Bertholon	REC		634	1.27	-2.99			
Charlottede Vilmorin	DIV		523	1.25	N/A			
Michel Goldstein	DVC		469	0.94	N/A			
Marianne Noel	LO		318	0.64	+0.10			
Camille Lebrun	DIV		0	0.00	N/A			
Valid votes			49,777	98.60	+0.14			
Blank votes			451	0.89	-0.23			
Null votes			255	0.51	+0.09			
Turnout			50,483	71.70	+17.30			
Abstentions			19,923	28.30	-17.30			
Registered voters			70,406					
Source: Ministry of the Interior, Le Monde
Result						LFI HOLD		

=== 2022 ===
Legislative Election 2022: Paris's 10th constituency
Party	Candidate	Votes	%	±%
LFI (NUPÉS)	Rodrigo Arenas	16,039	42.63	+10.07
LREM (Ensemble)	Anne-Christine Lang	11,030	29.31	-13.07
RN	Wallerand de Saint Just	2,075	5.51	+1.06
LR (UDC)	Habib Shoukry	1,927	5.12	−7.19
REC	Anne-Sophie Hongre	1,602	4.26	N/A
UDI (UDC)	Myriam Muet	1,302	3.46	N/A
DVG	Margarita Modrono Rodriguez	947	2.52	N/A
Others	N/A	2,706		
Turnout		38,220	54.41	−1.70
2nd round result
LFI (NUPÉS)	Rodrigo Arenas	19,808	54.43	+14.54
LREM (Ensemble)	Anne-Christine Lang	16,585	45.57	−14.54
Turnout		36,393	54.30	+5.38
LFI gain from LREM				

=== 2017 ===
Legislative Election 2017: Paris's 10th constituency
Party	Candidate	Votes	%	±%
LREM	Anne-Christine Lang	15,786	42.38	N/A
LFI	Leila Chaibi	5,447	14.62	N/A
LR	Sandrine Richard	4,584	12.31	−10.82
PS	Ryadh Sallem	3,379	9.07	N/A
EELV	Sybille Bernard	2,418	6.49	−36.40
FN	Thiphaine Leost	1,656	4.45	−2.82
PCF	Maxime Cochard	887	2.38	−9.24
Others	N/A	3,096		
Turnout		37,796	56.11	−2.22
2nd round result
LREM	Anne-Christine Lang	18,181	60.11	N/A
LFI	Leila Chaibi	12,063	39.89	N/A
Turnout		32,947	48.92	−5.28
LREM gain from EELV		Swing		

=== 2012 ===
The 2010 redistricting of French legislative constituencies meant that the 2012 10th constituency was made up of areas of Paris previously in the 10th and 11th constituencies.

Legislative Election 2012: Paris's 10th constituency
Party	Candidate	Votes	%	±%
EELV	Denis Baupin	16,692	42.89	+38.02
UMP	Chenva Tieu	9,003	23.13	−12.84
FG	Leila Chaibi	4,524	11.62	+8.74
FN	Bruno Lalouette	2,828	7.27	+5.09
MoDem	Chantal Godinot	1,696	4.36	−7.76
Others	N/A	4,178		
Turnout		38,921	58.33	−8.23
2nd round result
EELV	Denis Baupin	23,393	64.73	N/A
UMP	Chenva Tieu	12,747	35.27	−7.39
Turnout		36,140	54.20	−9.85
EELV gain from PS				

=== 2007 ===
Elections between 1988 and 2007 were based on the 1988 boundaries.

Map of Paris Constituencies, 1988-2007 elections

Legislative Election 2007: Paris's 10th constituency
Party	Candidate	Votes	%	±%
PS	Serge Blisko	15,827	36.75	
UMP	Véronique Vasseur	15,491	35.97	
MoDem	Danièle Auffray	5,222	12.12	
LV	Florence Lamblin	2,099	4.87	
PCF	Clara Mariette	1,241	2.88	
FN	Monique Raison	940	2.18	
Others	N/A	2,045		
Turnout		43,425	66.56	
2nd round result
PS	Serge Blisko	23,512	57.34	
UMP	Véronique Vasseur	17,490	42.66	
Turnout		41,783	64.05	
PS hold				

=== 2002 ===
Legislative Election 2002: Paris's 10th constituency
Party	Candidate	Votes	%	±%
PS	Serge Blisko	15,858	37.76	
UMP	Jacques Toubon	14,841	35.34	
FN	Catherine de Boisbaudry	2,333	5.56	
UDF	Fanny Rousseau	2,179	5.19	
LV	Denis Drouhet	1,984	4.72	
PCF	Francis Combrouze	927	2.21	
Others	N/A	3,874		
Turnout		42,433	72.73	
2nd round result
PS	Serge Blisko	21,345	53.49	
UMP	Jacques Toubon	18,560	46.51	
Turnout		40,922	70.15	
PS hold				

=== 1997 ===
Legislative Election 1997: Paris's 10th constituency
Party	Candidate	Votes	%	±%
RPR	Jacques Toubon	13,305	34.97	
PS	Serge Blisko	11,334	29.79	
FN	Yves de Guemper	3,375	8.87	
PCF	Daniel Vaubaillon	2,414	6.35	
LV	Françoise Steller	1,817	4.78	
LO	Monique Leborgne	1,081	2.84	
DVD	Philippe Cuignache-Gallois	785	2.06	
Others	N/A	3,934		
Turnout		39,189	65.50	
2nd round result
PS	Serge Blisko	21,039	51.46	
RPR	Jacques Toubon	19,844	48.54	
Turnout		42,477	71.01	
PS gain from RPR				
