= Serge Blisko =

French politician (born 1950)

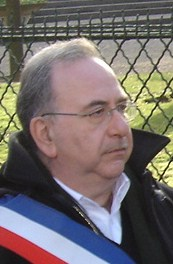
- Serge Blisko in 2006

Mayor of the 13th arrondissement of Paris
- In office 2001–2007
- Preceded by: Jacques Toubon
- Succeeded by: Jérôme Coumet

Member of the National Assembly for Paris's 10th constituency
- In office 1997–2012
- Preceded by: Lionel Assouad
- Succeeded by: Denis Baupin

Personal details
- Born: 6 January 1950 (age 76) Nancy, France
- Party: Socialist Party
- Profession: Physician

Serge Blisko (born 6 January 1950) is a French politician and a member of the National Assembly of France from 1997 to 2012. He was reelected as the member of the seventh legislature (spanning from 2007 to 2012) for the tenth Parisian constituency. He is a socialist, a doctor, and a member of the municipal government for the 13th arrondissement of Paris.

He was appointed President of the French government agency MIVILUDES from August 2012 to October 2018.

He is a native speaker of Yiddish.

== List of mandates held ==
- 1983-11-05 – 1986-04-01 : MP
- 1986-03-17 – 1992-03-22 : Member of the Regional council of the Île-de-France.
- 1993-01-01 – 1995-06-18 : Member of the general council of Paris.
- 1993-01-01 – 1995-06-18 : Member of the council of Paris.
- 1995-06-19 – 2001-03-18 : Member of the general council of Paris.
- 1995-06-19 – 2001-03-18 : Member of the council of Paris.
- 1997-06-01 – 2002-06-18 : MP
- 2001-03-19 – 2008-03-16 : Member of the council of Paris; Member of the municipal council of the thirteenth borough of Paris, of which he was the mayor until 2007-07-12 (replaced by Jérôme Coumet)
- 2002-06-18 – 2007-06-17 : MP
