= Denis Kessler =

French businessman (1952–2023)

- Born: 25 March 1952; Mulhouse, France
- Died: 9 June 2023 (aged 71)
- Education: Lycée Kléber
- Alma mater: HEC Paris
- Occupation: CEO of SCOR SE

Denis Kessler (25 March 1952 – 9 June 2023) was a French businessman. He served as the chairman of the board of directors and chief executive officer of SCOR SE from 2002 until his death. Prior to this, he served as vice-chairman of MEDEF and CEO of AXA.

== Biography ==
Kessler graduated from HEC Paris, and received a PhD in economics from the University of Paris.

He was a board member of BNP Paribas, Bolloré, Dassault Aviation, Invesco, and Fonds stratégique d'investissement. He was member of the supervisory board of Yam Invest N.V. He served as the President of Le Siècle from 2007 to 2010.

Kessler criticised the Keynesian reaction to the 2008 financial crisis, and he suggested the end of the Euro currency was a real possibility.

He died on 9 June 2023, at the age of 71.
