= Defender of Rights (France) =

French institution

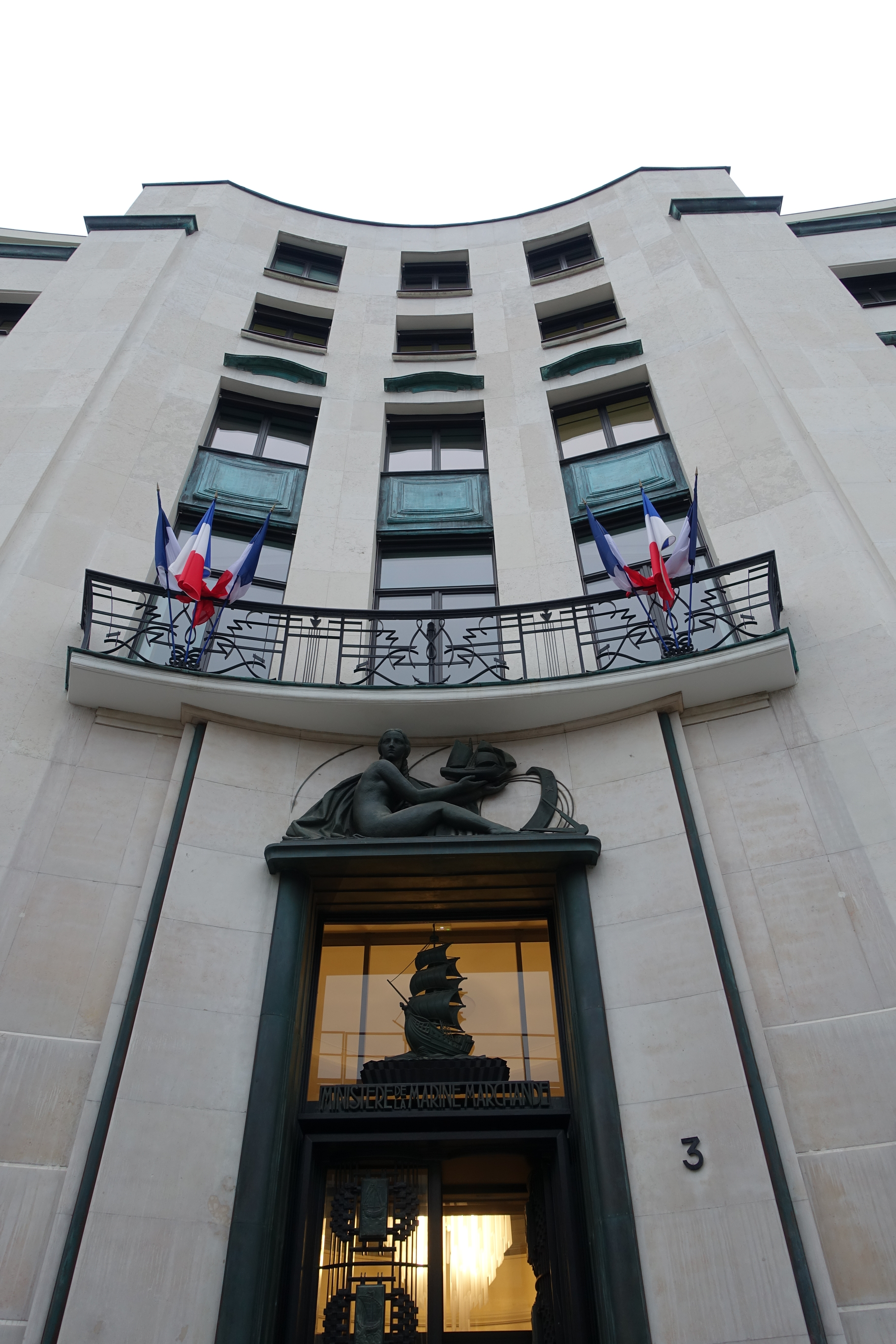
The institution is based at the Fontenoy building in Paris.

In France, the Defender of Rights (DDD) (French: Défenseur des droits) is an independent administrative authority of the Government of France, created by the constitutional revision of July 23, 2008 and instituted by the organic law of March 29, 2011.

The Defender of Rights is an independent administrative authority enshrined by the Constitution of France.

The current Defender of Rights is journalist Claire Hédon.

== History ==
The expression “Defender of Rights” was used by Gracchus Babeuf in the subtitle of his newspaper Le Tribun du peuple from 1795: “The Defender of Human Rights”.

In 2007, the Reflection and Proposal Committee on the Modernization and Rebalancing of Institutions, known as the “Balladur Committee”, proposed the creation of a “Defender of Fundamental Rights” to replace the Mediator of the Republic, an institution created in 1973 but which is not mentioned by the Constitution. According to the report, the Defender of Fundamental Rights, inspired by the Defender of the People in Spain, should be appointed by the National Assembly.

== Responsibilities ==
The organic law of March 29, 2011, amended by the law of December 9, 2016, established four other additional missions for the Defender of Rights:

1. Defend and promote the best interests and the rights of the child enshrined in law or by an international commitment regularly ratified or approved by France;
2. Fight against discrimination, direct or indirect, prohibited by law or by an international commitment regularly ratified or approved by France as well as to promote equality;
3. Ensure compliance with ethics by people carrying out security activities on the territory of the Republic;
4. Direct to the competent authorities any person reporting an alert under the conditions set by law, to ensure the rights and freedoms of this person

== List of officeholders ==
Name	Term start	Term end
Dominique Baudis	23 June 2011	10 April 2014
Jacques Toubon	17 July 2014	17 July 2020
Claire Hédon	22 July 2020	Incumbent
