= Odile Jacob =

French publisher

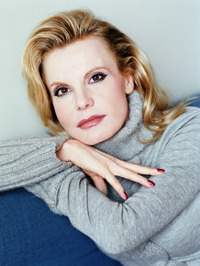
- Education: Harvard University
- Occupation(s): Publisher, cognitive scientist
- Known for: Founder of Les Éditions Odile Jacob
- Parent: François Jacob
- Awards: Grand Prix de l’Information Scientifique (1991); Veuve Clicquot Businesswoman of the Year (1995); Grinzane Cavour Prize for Publishing (2004); Doctor Honoris Causa, EPFL (2004); Officier of the National Order of the Legion of Honour (2010)

Odile Jacob is a French publisher who founded Les Éditions Odile Jacob in the middle of the 1980s. She is also a trained scientist, studying the workings of the brain, the mind and thought. She is a member of Le Siècle.

== Biography ==
Odile Jacob's father, François Jacob (17 June 1920 – 19 April 2013), was a French biologist, who shared the 1965 Nobel Prize in Medicine.

Having been awarded a grant from the Sachs Foundation, Odile went to Harvard University to work on a thesis on the acquisition of concepts in children,. She was a pioneer in this field, which at the time was neither taught nor researched in France. In the United States, she studied with many professors, including Roger Brown and Jerry Kagan, who urged her to stay at Harvard and pursue her career there. She also received an offer from the Department of Cognitive Psychology at New York City’s Rockefeller University.

Forced to return to France for family reasons, she decided to become a publisher. Her company's goals were to give readers an understanding of the scientific advances that have transformed our contemporary world, and to make scientists and scholars internationally recognized. Jacob's achievements also include the development of state-of-the-art software to teach science — mathematics, physics, biology — and to help children learn science as early as possible.

The "Editions Odile Jacob" publishing company has published the work of many scientists and Nobel Prize winners including Jean-Pierre Changeux, Ilya Prigogine, James Watson, Richard Feynman, Stephen Hawking, Gerald Edelman, and Antonio Damasio. Jacob has also developed a strong list devoted to current affairs and politics: the former U.S. Presidents Barack Obama, George H. W. Bush, Bill Clinton, and George W. Bush, the former U.S. Secretary of the State Colin Powell, the former Soviet President Mikhail Gorbachev, the former German Chancellor Gerhard Schröder, the former Soviet foreign affairs Minister Eduard Shevardnadze, the late French President François Mitterrand, the former French President Jacques Chirac, and also the former European Commission Chairman Jacques Delors.

== Awards ==
- 1991: Grand Prix de l’Information Scientifique by the French Academy of Sciences
- 1995: businesswoman of the year by the Veuve Clicquot Prize Jury
- 2004: recipient of the Grinzane Cavour Prize for Publishing in Turin, Italy and Doctor Honoris Causa by the Ecole Polytechnique Fédérale in Lausanne
- 2010: Officier in the National Order of the Legion of Honor
