= Michèle Cotta =

French political journalist (born 1937)

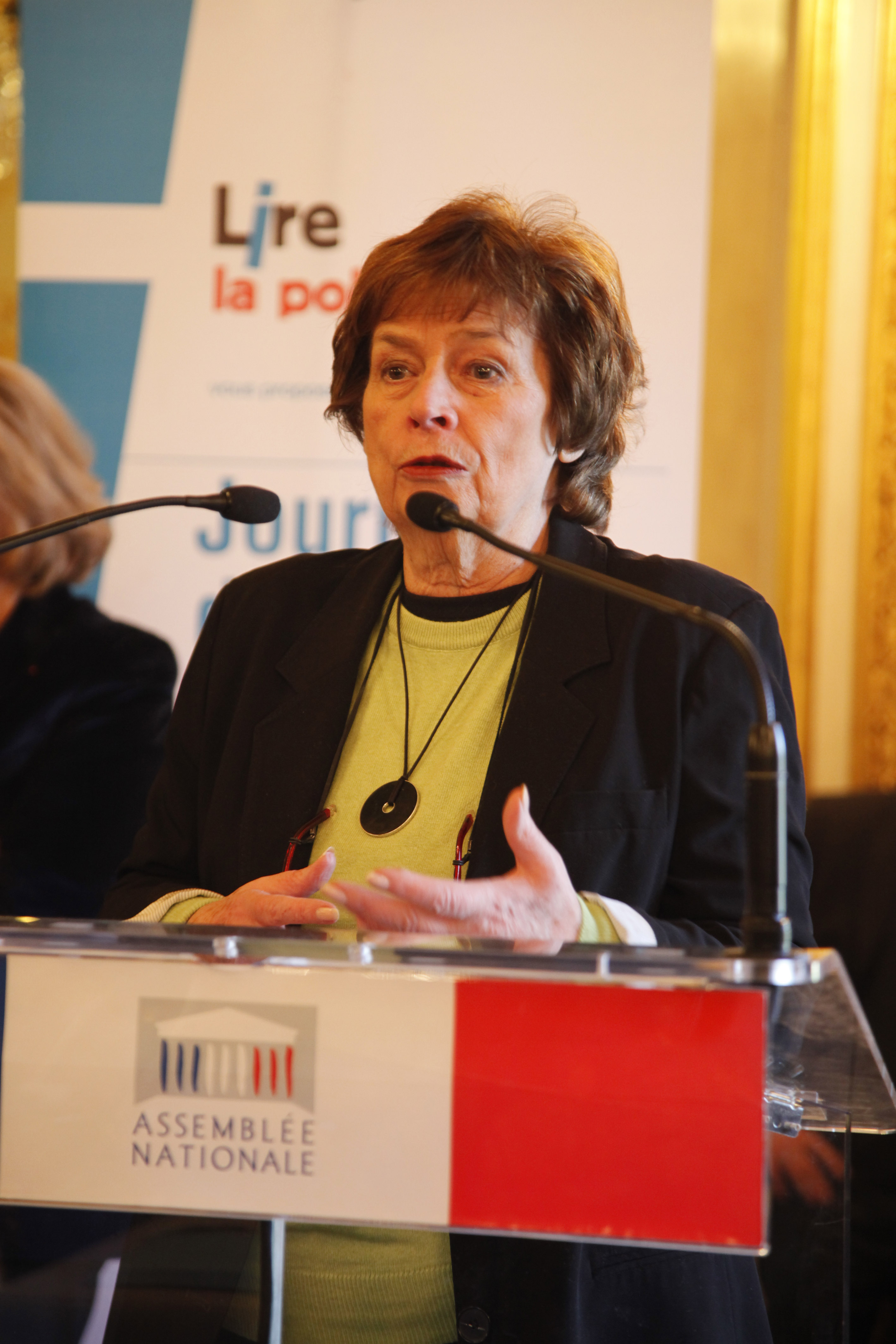
- Born: 15 June 1937 (age 89); Nice, France
- Education: Sciences Po
- Occupation: Political journalist

Michèle Cotta (born 15 June 1937) is a French political journalist.

== Biography ==
Her father, Jacques Cotta (1908–1971), was the mayor of Nice.

She started her career as a journalist for Combat. She moved on to interviewing politicians for L'Express, under the tutelage of Jean-Jacques Servan-Schreiber and Françoise Giroud. Between 1981 and 1986, then-President François Mitterrand appointed her as Head of Radio France, followed by the Haute Autorité, now known as the Conseil supérieur de l'audiovisuel. She also served as news director for TF1 and program director for France 2. She now teaches at Sciences Po. She is also an editor for the Nouvel économiste and Direct Soir.

In 1983, she became the first woman to join the think tank Le Siècle.

== Bibliography ==
- La Collaboration, 1940-1944 (Paris: Armand Colin, 1964)
- Les élections présidentielles de 1965 (co-written with Jean-François Revel, Imprimerie Busson, 1966)
- Les miroirs de Jupiter (Paris: Fayard, 1986)
- La Sixième République (Paris: Flammarion, 1992)
- Les secrets d'une victoire (Paris: Flammarion, 1999)
- Carnets secrets de la Présidentielle : mars 2001 - mai 2002 (Paris: Plon, 2002)
- Politic Circus (Paris: L’Archipel, 2004)
- Cahiers secrets de la Ve République, tome 1, 1965-1977 (Paris: Fayard, 2007)
- Cahiers secrets de la Ve République, tome 2, 1977-1986 (Paris: Fayard, 2008)
- Cahiers secrets de la Ve République, tome 3, 1986-1997 (Paris: Fayard, 2009)
- Cahiers secrets de la Ve République, tome 4, 1997-2007 (Paris: Fayard, 2010)
- Le Rose et le Gris : prélude au quinquennat de François Hollande (Paris: Fayard, 2012)
- Entretiens avec Michèle Cotta, Pierre Mauroy, une vie socialiste (Paris: Fondation Jean-Jaurès, 2013)
- Le Monde selon Mitterrand. Combats, pensées, arrière-pensées, piques, polémiques (Paris: Tallandier, 2015)
- Comment en est-on arrivé là ? (Paris: Robert Laffont, 2016)
- Fake News (co-written with Robert Namias, Paris: Robert Laffont, 2019)
- Le Paris de Mitterrand (Paris: Alexandrines, 2019)
- Ma Cinquième, tome 1 (Paris: Bouquins, 2023)
- Les Derniers grands, tome 2 (Paris: Plon, 2024)
