= Paris's 9th constituency =

Constituency of the National Assembly of France

9th constituency of Paris
- inline Constituency of the National Assembly of France

- Paris, showing its post 2012 legislative constituencies
- Deputy: Sandrine Rousseau; EELV
- Department: Paris
- Registered voters: 68,351

The 9th constituency of Paris (French: Neuvième circonscription de Paris) is a French legislative constituency in the Paris département (75). Like the other 576 French constituencies, it elects one MP using the two-round system. Its boundaries were heavily redrawn in 1988 and 2012.

9th constituency of Paris
- inline Constituency of the National Assembly of France

- Paris, showing its legislative constituencies between 1988 and 2012
- Member: constituency abolished, 2012
- Department: Paris

Map of Paris constituencies in 1981.

== Historic representation ==
Election	Member	Party	Source
1958	André Fanton	UNR	
1962	André Fanton	UNR	
1967	André Fanton	UDR	
1968	André Fanton	UDR	
1969	Michel Marquet	UDR	
1973	André Fanton	UDR	
1978	Alain Devaquet	RPR	
1981	Georges Sarre	PS	
1986	Proportional representation - no election by constituency		
1988	Paul Quilès	PS	
1988	Jean-Marie Le Guen	PS	
1993	Anne-Marie Couderc	RPR	
1995	Patrick Trémège	UDF	
1997	Jean-Marie Le Guen	PS	
2002	Jean-Marie Le Guen	PS	
2007	Jean-Marie Le Guen	PS	
2012	Jean-Marie Le Guen	PS	
2014	Anne-Christine Lang	PS	
2017	Buon Tan	LREM	
2022	Sandrine Rousseau	EELV	

== Election results ==
=== 2024 ===
Candidate	Party	Alliance	First round			Second round		
Candidate	Party	Alliance	Votes	%	+/–	Votes	%	+/–
Sandrine Rousseau	LÉ	NFP	26,020	52.13	+3.71			
Pegah Malek-Ahmadi	HOR	ENS	11,560	23.14	-3.63			
Marie-Josée Boulaire	RN		5,733	11.49	+6.50			
Jean-Baptiste Olivier	LR diss.		2,290	4.59	N/A			
Elisabeth Stibbe	LR		1,495	3.00	-4.21			
Jade Farran	UDI		678	1.36	N/A			
Marion Bottou	REC		611	1.22	-3.16			
Julian Rozenberg	DVE		565	1.13	N/A			
Florence Jacqueline Chantal Bedague	LO		396	0.79	-0.18			
Sophie Chen	DVC		269	0.54	N/A			
Blandine Chauvel	NPA		251	0.50	N/A			
Marc Ely	DIV		55	0.11	N/A			
Valid votes			49,913	98.36	+0.25			
Blank votes			570	1.12	-0.26			
Null votes			263	0.52	+0.01			
Turnout			50,746	71.14	+16.34			
Abstentions			20,586	28.86	-16.34			
Registered voters			71,332					
Source: Ministry of the Interior, Le Monde
Result						LÉ HOLD		

=== 2022 ===
Legislative Election 2022: Paris's 9th constituency
Party	Candidate	Votes	%	±%
EELV (NUPÉS)	Sandrine Rousseau	16,330	42.90	+3.19
LREM (Ensemble)	Buon Tan	10,192	26.77	-9.66
LR (UDC)	Jean-Baptiste Olivier	2,745	7.21	−1.17
DVG	Laurent Miermont	2,103	5.52	N/A
RN	Carole Isabelle Gabrielle Roussel	1,898	4.99	+0.43
REC	David Meyer	1,669	4.38	N/A
Others	N/A	3,130		
Turnout		38,805	54.80	+0.09
2nd round result
EELV (NUPÉS)	Sandrine Rousseau	20,634	58.05	+13.31
LREM (Ensemble)	Buon Tan	14,912	41.95	−13.31
Turnout		35,546	53.23	+4.94
EELV gain from LREM				

=== 2017 ===
Legislative Election 2017: Paris's 9th constituency
Party	Candidate	Votes	%	±%
LREM	Buon Tan	13,384	36.43	N/A
LFI	Raphaël Qnouch	5,573	15.17	N/A
PS	Martin Lagane	4,230	11.51	−35.66
EELV	Claire Monod	3,531	9.61	+3.55
LR	Laure Esquieu	3,080	8.38	−13.44
FN	Corinne Berthaud	1,677	4.56	−2.42
PCF	Jean-Noël Aqua	1,257	3.42	−6.85
Others	N/A	4,009		
Turnout		37,398	54.71	−3.82
2nd round result
LREM	Buon Tan	16,669	55.26	N/A
LFI	Raphaël Qnouch	13,497	44.74	N/A
Turnout		33,010	48.29	−6.05
LREM gain from PS		Swing		

=== 2012 ===
Legislative Election 2012: Paris's 9th constituency
Party	Candidate	Votes	%	±%
PS	Jean-Marie Le Guen	18,372	47.17	+8.55
UMP	Anne-Sophie Souhaite	8,497	21.82	−9.31
FG	Emmanuelle Becker	4,001	10.27	+6.62
FN	Catherine Creton	2,718	6.98	N/A
EELV	Guillaume Fillon	2,360	6.06	+2.14
MoDem	Fadila Mehal	1,155	2.97	−7.83
Others	N/A	1,844		
Turnout		38,947	58.53	−2.42
2nd round result
PS	Jean-Marie Le Guen	24,902	68.88	+6.31
UMP	Anne-Sophie Souhaite	11,253	31.12	−6.31
Turnout		36,155	54.34	−4.21
PS hold				

=== 2007 ===
Elections between 1988 and 2007 were based on the 1988 boundaries.

Map of Paris Constituencies, 1988-2007 elections

Legislative Election 2007: Paris's 9th constituency
Party	Candidate	Votes	%	±%
PS	Jean-Marie Le Guen	14,382	38.62	
UMP	Patrick Trémège	11,593	31.13	
MoDem	Nicole Martin	4,022	10.80	
LV	Zine-Eddine M'Jati	1,460	3.92	
PCF	Francis Combrouze	1,361	3.65	
Far left	Natacha Larchet	1,141	3.06	
Others	N/A	2,175		
Turnout		37,693	60.95	
2nd round result
PS	Jean-Marie Le Guen	22,108	62.57	
UMP	Patrick Trémège	13,223	37.43	
Turnout		36,204	58.55	
PS hold				

=== 2002 ===
Legislative Election 2002: Paris's 9th constituency
Party	Candidate	Votes	%	±%
PS	Jean-Marie Le Guen	13,892	38.80	
UMP	Patrick Trémège	12,184	34.03	
FN	Pierre Champouillon	2,457	6.86	
LV	Jean Desessard	1,802	5.03	
PCF	Cécile Regnier	1,186	3.31	
PR	Natacha Polony	803	2.24	
Others	N/A	3,476		
Turnout		36,529	68.14	
2nd round result
PS	Jean-Marie Le Guen	18,769	55.84	
UMP	Patrick Trémège	14,841	44.16	
Turnout		34,613	64.57	
PS hold				

=== 1997 ===
Legislative Election 1997: Paris's 9th constituency
Party	Candidate	Votes	%	±%
PS	Jean-Marie Le Guen	11,159	33.41	
RPR	Anne-Marie Couderc	10,433	31.24	
FN	Pierre Champouillon	3,549	10.63	
PCF	Martine Marchand	2,661	7.97	
LV	Herve Dufour	1,231	3.69	
LO	Charline Joliveau	1,076	3.22	
Others	N/A	3,291		
Turnout		34,531	64.08	
2nd round result
PS	Jean-Marie Le Guen	19,767	55.02	
RPR	Anne-Marie Couderc	16,159	44.98	
Turnout		37,409	69.43	
PS gain from RPR				
