= Jean-Marie Colombani =

French journalist (born 1948)

- Born: 7 July 1948 (age 77); Dakar, Senegal
- Occupation: Journalist

Jean-Marie Colombani (born 7 July 1948 in Dakar, Senegal) is a French journalist, and was the editor-in-chief of the daily newspaper Le Monde from 1994 until 2007.

== Biography ==
Educated at Panthéon-Assas University and Science-Po, he is the author of the lead article published after the New York City terrorist attacks of September 11, 2001 on the front page of his newspaper, entitled "We Are All Americans". In 2004 Colombani co-authored with Walter Wells, editor of the International Herald Tribune, the volume Dangerous De-Liaisons : What's Really behind the War between France and the U.S. (published by Melville House Publishing). From 2005 he has been part of the board of directors of La Stampa. In 1999 he received the Ischia International Journalism Award. He has been a member of Le Siècle. He is a member of the Fondation Écologie d'Avenir.

== Decorations ==
- Chevalier of the Legion of Honour (2015)
