= Anne-Marie Couderc =

French politician and business executive

Minister of Labour
- In office 1995–1997
- President: Jacques Chirac
- Prime Minister: Alain Juppé

Member of the National Assembly for Paris's 9th constituency
- In office 1993–1995
- Preceded by: Jean-Marie Le Guen
- Succeeded by: Patrick Trémège

Personal details
- Born: 13 February 1950 (age 76) Aubusson, France
- Party: RPR
- Profession: Lawyer

Anne-Marie Couderc (born 13 February 1950) is a French politician and business executive.

Couderc was a Deputy from Paris from 1993 to 1995, Secretary of State and Minister responsible for Employment from 1995 to 1997. She was President of Presstalis, from 2010 to 2017 and has been acting chair of the board of Air France–KLM since 15 May 2018.

== Career ==
=== Early beginnings ===
A lawyer by training, Couderc began her career at the Paris Bar, before joining in 1982, as an assistant to the Secretary General, of Hachette Press, which became Hachette Filipacchi Presse in 1993, a group in which she held various positions.

Couderc was assistant to the mayor Jacques Chirac, and then member of Parliament elected in the 13th district. She was appointed in 1995 secretary of state to the Prime Minister, in charge of the employment, in the first government of Alain Juppé, then delegated to the minister of Labor and Social Affairs (Jacques Barrot) in his second government.

=== Career in the private sector ===
In 1997, Couderc became Deputy General Manager and member of the editorial board of Hachette Filipacchi Médias, General Manager of Presse magazine France and chairman of the Board of Managers of Hachette Filipacchi Associés.

She organized the restructuring of Première magazine by replacing Alain Kruger by Patrick Mahé, in the aftermath of the attacks of 11 September 2001, but in August 2005, validated the coverage of Paris Match, on Cécilia Sarkozy and Richard Attias, in the absence of Arnaud Lagardère and was fired.

From October 2004 to June 2010, Couderc was president of SPMI (Union of the magazine and information press). In June 2005, she was appointed Vice President of the Superior Council of Press Couriers.

Couderc joined the management board of Presstalis under the Lagardère group in 2007. She became the company's General Manager on 23 August 2010. She remained until 30 June 2011, when she was elected chair of the Board of Directors following the change of status of the company..

In 2015, Couderc joined the French Economic, Social and Environmental Council as a representative of private industrial, commercial and service companies.

On May 15, 2018, Couderc was appointed acting president of Air France-KLM, replacing Jean-Marc Janaillac. She was previously an independent director of the group and chair of the nominating committee of the board of directors. This is a non-executive presidency, the operational management of operations being handled by the heads of the two companies Air France (Franck Terner) and KLM (Pieter Elbers), as well as by the financial director Frédéric Gagey.

== Details of offices and functions ==
=== Elected offices ===
1983–2001: Paris councillor.
1989–2001: Deputy Mayor of Paris.
1993–1995: Member of Parliament for Paris (9th constituency: 13th arrondissement).

== Other activities ==
- Ramsay Santé, Independent Member of the Board of Directors
- Presstalis, chair of the Board of Directors
- Plastic Omnium, Independent Member of the Board of Directors (since 2010)
- Transdev, Independent Member of the Board of Directors
