= Buon Tan =

French politician

Member of the National Assembly for Paris's 9th constituency
- In office 21 June 2017 – 21 June 2022
- Preceded by: Anne-Christine Lang
- Succeeded by: Sandrine Rousseau

Personal details
- Born: Buon Huong Tan; 10 March 1967 (age 59) Phnom Penh, Cambodia
- Party: La République En Marche!

Buon Tan
- Simplified Chinese: 陈文雄
- Traditional Chinese: 陳文雄
Transcriptions
Standard Mandarin
- Hanyu Pinyin: Chén Wénxióng

Buon Huong Tan (Chinese: 陈文雄; born 10 March 1967) is a French politician formerly serving as the member of the National Assembly for the 9th constituency of Paris since 2017. A member of La République En Marche! (LREM), his constituency covers part of the 13th arrondissement. Tan lost his reelection bid in the 2022 French legislative election.

== Family and youth ==
Tan arrived in France as a refugee from Cambodia in 1975, as his Chinese Cambodian family fled the Khmer Rouge. They settled in Tours, before he moved to Paris for his studies. He then joined his two sisters in working for their father's business.

== Political career ==
In Parliament, Tan serves as member of the Committee on Foreign Affairs. In addition to his committee assignments, he is the president of the French-Chinese Parliamentary Friendship Group.

In a ranking published by Le Parisien in early 2021, Tan was ranked as one of the least active members of the National Assembly between 2017 and 2020, having participated in only 10 percent of all parliamentary votes.

In January 2022, Tan was the only deputy to vote against a cross-party resolution recognizing and condemning the “genocidal nature of the systematic political violence and crimes against humanity currently perpetrated by China against the Uyghurs.“

Buon Tan is a member of several Chinese Communist Party-affiliated groups, and has invited multiple Chinese ambassadors to France to give speeches to the National Assembly. In May 2019, he visited Beijing to attend a meeting of the Chinese Overseas Friendship Association and was photographed shaking the hand of General Secretary Xi Jinping.

== See also ==
- 2017 French legislative election
