= Marie-Claire Carrère-Gée =

French politician (born 1963)

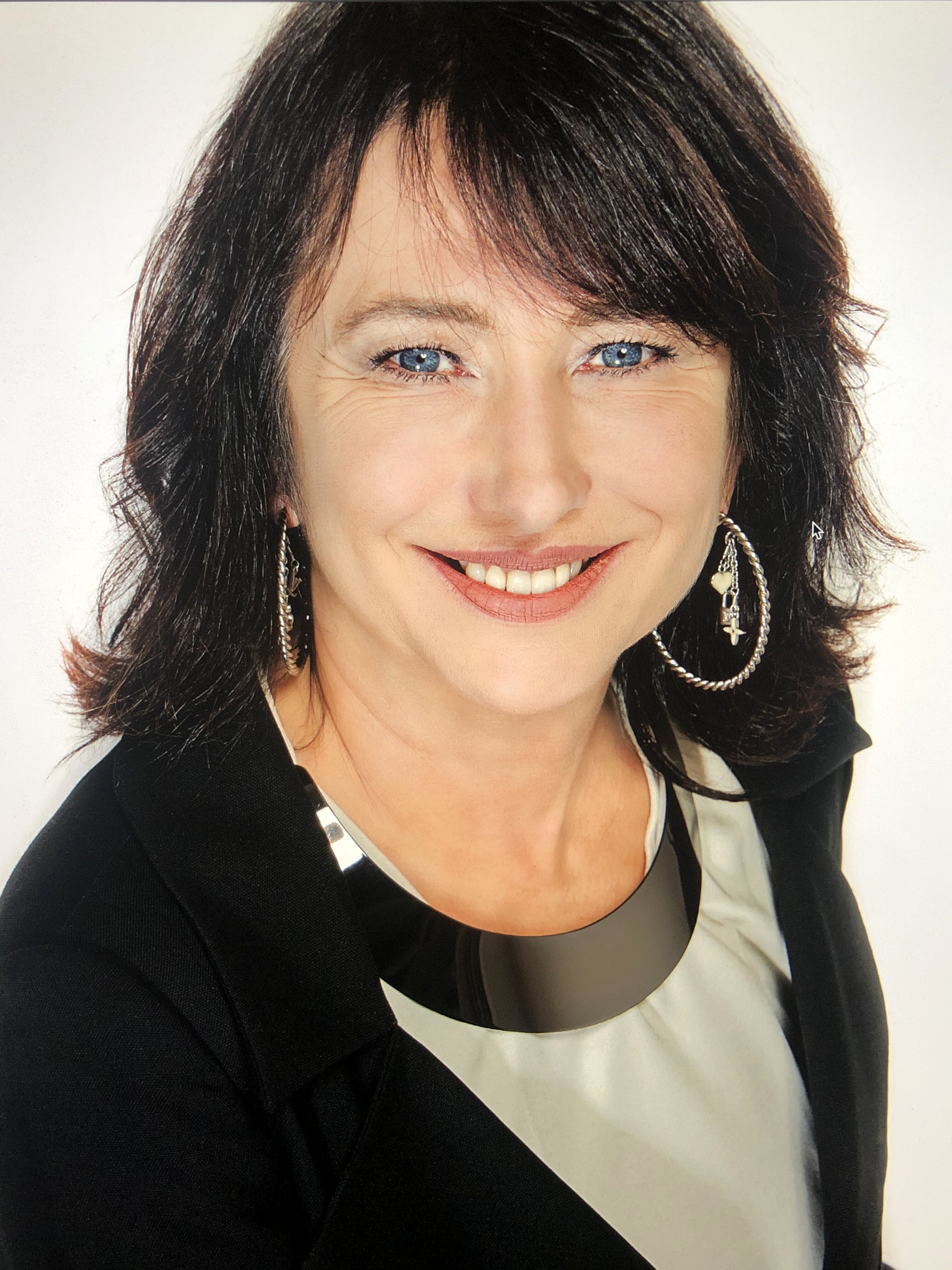
- Carrère-Gée in 2020

Minister Delegate for Government Coordination
- Incumbent
- Assumed office 21 September 2024
- Prime Minister: Michel Barnier
- Preceded by: Office established

Senator for Paris
- In office 2 October 2023 – 21 October 2024
- Succeeded by: Jean-Baptiste Olivier

Member of the Regional Council of Île-de-France
- In office 2 July 2021 – 10 October 2023
- In office 2 April 2004 – 26 March 2010

Councillor of Paris
- Incumbent
- Assumed office 25 August 2018
- Constituency: 14th arrondissement
- In office 18 March 2008 – 30 March 2014
- Constituency: 14th arrondissement

Personal details
- Born: 23 March 1963 (age 63) Pau, France
- Party: The Republicans (2015–present)
- Other political affiliations: Rally for the Republic (until 2002); Union for a Popular Movement (2002–2015)
- Education: Institut d'études politiques de Bordeaux
- Occupation: Civil servant

Marie-Claire Carrère-Gée (French pronunciation: [maʁiklɛːʁ kaʁɛʁʒe]; born 23 March 1963) is a French senior civil servant and politician of The Republicans (LR) who briefly served as Minister Delegate for Government Coordination, a newly-created portfolio, in the government of Prime Minister Michel Barnier from September to December 2024. Prior to her appointment to the government, she briefly represented Paris in the Senate (2023–2024).

== Career ==
A native of Pau, her family is originally from Oloron-Sainte-Marie, Pyrénées-Atlantiques nearby.

In 2002, Carrère-Gée was appointed the social affairs adviser to President Jacques Chirac. From 2006 to 2007, she served as Deputy Secretary General of the Élysée.

In 2004, Carrère-Gée was elected for one six-year term to the Regional Council of Île-de-France. She was elected again in 2021, holding a seat until her resignation in 2023 following her election to the Senate. She has also been a member of the Council of Paris since 2018, having previously served from 2008 to 2014.

In the 2022 legislative election, Carrère-Gée was a candidate in Paris's 11th constituency, covering parts of the 6th and 14th arrondissements, earning 12.2% of the first-round vote. In 2023, Carrère-Gée was elected to the Senate for Paris.

In 2024, Carrère-Gée was appointed to the government of Prime Minister Michel Barnier with the title of minister delegate, tasked with government coordination.

== Political positions ==
Ahead of the 2017 presidential election, Carrère-Gée supported Alain Juppé in the 2016 The Republicans presidential primary.

Ahead of the 2022 presidential election, she endorsed Michel Barnier as The Republicans' candidate for President of France. She was his primary campaign manager for the 2021 The Republicans congress, at which he placed third.
