= Ordonnance =

Type of temporary statute law in France

In French law, an ordonnance (French: [ɔʁdɔnɑ̃s], "order") is a statutory instrument issued by the Council of Ministers in an area of law normally reserved for primary legislation enacted by the French Parliament. They function as temporary statutes pending ratification by the Parliament; failing ratification they function as mere executive regulations.

Ordonnances should not be confused with décrets issued by the prime minister (an order-in-council) or president, or with ministerial orders (arrêtés); these are issued either in matters where the Constitution allows primary legislation from the Council or as secondary legislation implementing a statute.

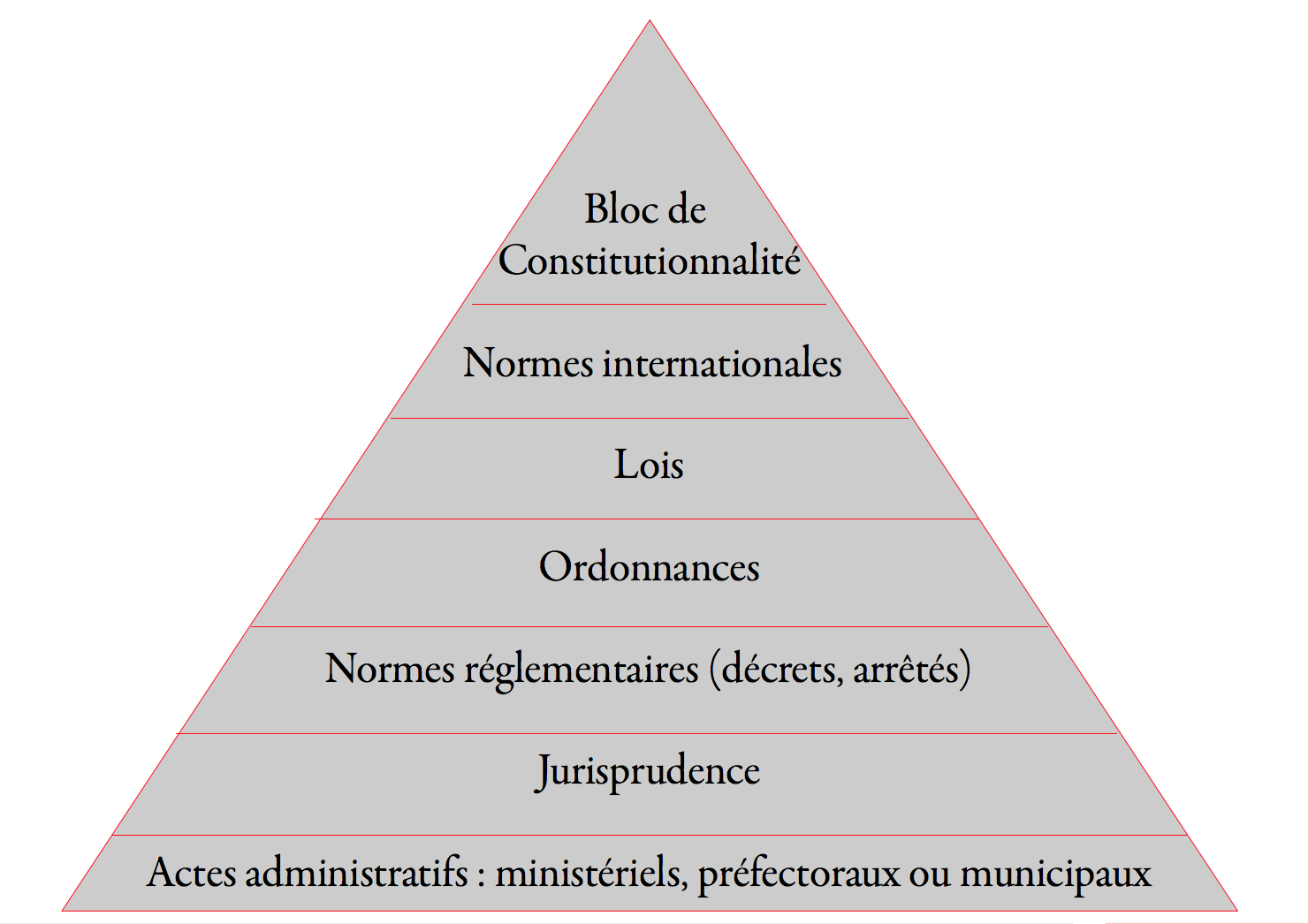
Hierarchy of French legal norms

In the French justice system, the word can also refer to a summary ruling made by a single judge for simple cases.

== Current usage ==
=== Motivations ===
Article 34 of the Constitution of France restricts certain legal matters to primary legislation to be enacted by Parliament. All other areas of law fall within the domain of delegated legislation in the form of orders-in-council (OIC) issued by the Prime Minister or ministerial orders issued by individual cabinet ministers.

Orders-in-council and other delegated legislation issued in areas reserved for primary legislation are illegal, unless they are specifically authorized by statute. Such orders define implementation measures and details left out by the originating statute.

For various reasons explained below, the Executive may sometimes want to pass primary legislation in a field reserved by statute. The ordonnances are the constitutional means to do so.

Delegated legislation can be nullified or invalidated through litigation before the Council of State (acting in their role of legislative review) if they violate general legal principles or constitutional rights, whereas primary legislation may be ruled unconstitutional only through judicial review before the Constitutional Council. Statutes are thus relatively more solid.

=== Vocabulary notes ===
The decisions made by the French President under art. 16 of the French Constitution, enabling him to take emergency measures in times where the existence of the Republic is at stake (a form of reserve powers) are not called ordonnances, but simply décisions.

The introductory sentence of an ordonnance, as published in the Journal Officiel de la République Française, is: "The President of the Republic [...], after hearing the Council of State, after hearing the Council of Ministers, orders:". The word ordonnance comes from the same root as ordonner "to order".

=== Procedure ===
==== Normal procedure ====
In the French Fifth Republic, most ordonnances operate pursuant to article 38 of the French Constitution.

The Council of Ministers first introduces a bill before Parliament authorizing it to issue ordonnances to implement its program. The bill specifies a limited period of time, as well as a topic for the proposed ordonnances. If the bill passes in Parliament, the French Cabinet can issue ordonnances on the given legal matter within the specified time period. The Executive must consult the Council of State on every ordonnance; the advice of the Council is compulsory but nonbinding.

An ordonnance must be signed by the French President, the Prime Minister and relevant ministers. This proved in 1986 to be a source of tension, during a period of cohabitation when President François Mitterrand and Prime Minister Jacques Chirac were of opposite political opinions, and the President refused to sign ordonnances requested by the Prime Minister, forcing him to go through the normal parliamentary procedure, but it was then controversial at the time whether he had the right to refuse to sign them.

Before the time period has elapsed, the Cabinet must introduce before Parliament a bill of ratification for the ordonnances, otherwise these lapse at the end of the period. Until Parliament has voted the ratification bill, the ordonnances, similar to executive orders, can be challenged before the Council of State.

If they are ratified, they become like ordinary statutes. There is, however, no obligation that they should be ratified, and they are then mere regulations. In fact, between 1960 and 1990, out of 158 ordonnances, only about 30 were ratified. That can happen because even though the ratification bill has been brought before Parliament, it is not necessarily scheduled for examination and vote. If Parliament votes down the ratification bill, it does not go into effect.

The Constitutional Council and the Council of State decided that ratification can be explicit (a vote on the ratification bill or a ratification amendment added to another bill) but also be performed implicitly by Parliament referring to an ordonnance as if it were a statute. However, implicit ratification has been prohibited by a 2008 constitutional amendment.

Occasionally, the executive fails to use the authorization that it requested and obtained.

==== Budget bills ====
It is of particular importance that budget bills should be voted in a timely manner, since they authorize taxes and spending. For this reason, the Government can adopt the budget by ordonnances if Parliament has not been able to agree on it within 70 days after the proposal of the budget (Constitution, article 47). The same applies for social security budget bills, but with a 50-day period (Constitution, article 47-1).

Neither of these procedures has ever been used.

==== Overseas territories ====
Article 74-1 of the Constitution allows the Government to extend legislation applicable to Metropolitan France to overseas territories by ordonnances. These ordonnances lapse if they have not been ratified within 18 months by Parliament.

=== Usage and controversy ===
The use of ordonnances is uncontroversial when used for technical texts (such as the ordinances that converted all sums in French francs to euros in the various laws in force in France). Ordonnances are also used to adopt and adapt European Directives into French law to avoid delayed adoption of a directive, which often happens, is criticized by the EU Commission and exposes France to fines.

Ordonnances are also used to codify law into codes to rearrange them for the sake of clarity without substantially modifying them. Such usage has, however, been criticized for the legal risks that it poses if the ratification act is never voted on.

The use of ordonnances for controversial laws is generally criticised by the opposition as antidemocratic and demeaning to Parliament (Guillaume, 2005) in much the same way as the use of article 49§3 to force a bill to be passed.

== Previous usage ==
Ordonnances have been extensively used as a form of rule by decree in periods where the government operated without a working Parliament: Vichy France, where the executive had dismissed Parliament and other democratic structures, the Provisional Government of the French Republic, until it could establish a legislature, and in the last days of the French Fourth Republic and the early days of the French Fifth Republic, until the new constitution had come into force and legislative elections had been held (article 92 of the Constitution, now repealed).

Certain legal texts enacted by the King in the medieval and ancien régime eras were called ordonnances, the best known of which today is the Ordinance of Villers-Cotterêts.

== See also ==
- Ordonnance section of Government of France
