= Gérard Worms =

French banker and businessman (1936–2020)

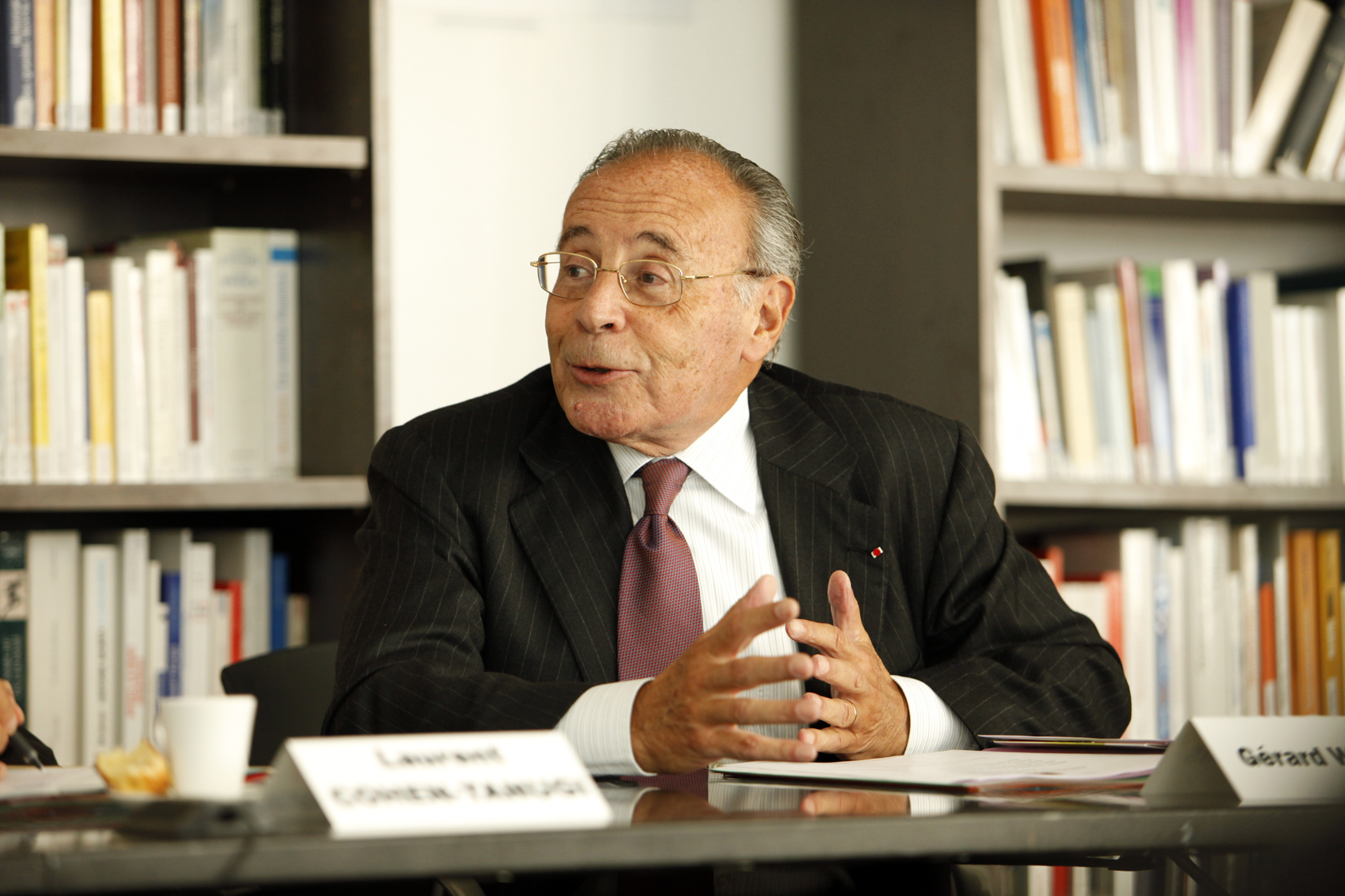
- October 2009
- Born: 1 August 1936; Paris, France
- Died: 31 August 2020 (aged 84)
- Education: École Polytechnique; Mines ParisTech
- Occupations: Banker, Businessman

Gérard Worms (1 August 1936 – 31 August 2020) was a French banker and businessman. He was the Vice Chairman of Rothschild Europe and Senior Advisor of Rothschild & Cie Banque.

== Early life and education ==
Gérard Worms was born on 1 August 1936, in Paris. He graduated from the École Polytechnique and Mines ParisTech.

== Career ==
He started his career as a technical adviser in the French civil service. He was an advisor to Olivier Guichard (1920–2004), Minister of Industry from 1967 to 1968, and to Jacques Chaban-Delmas (1915–2000), Prime Minister from 1969 to 1972. Since 1972, he has worked at the Hachette Group, the Rhône-Poulenc Group, the Société Générale de Belgique, and Telecom Italia. He was Deputy Chairman of the supervisory board and Vice President of M6. From 1990 to 1995, he was the chief executive officer of the Compagnie de Suez. From 1995 to 1999, he was Chairman of the Compagnie de Suez and Indosuez Private Banking.

He was a member of the supervisory board of Publicis from 1998 to 2013. He was on the Boards of Directors of Saatchi & Saatchi, Mercapital, Éditions Atlas, Paris Orléans, Financière Saint Merri, and Cofide. He was the Chairman of the International Chamber of Commerce (ICC) from 2011 to 2013. He also was on the Board of Advisors of Degrémont. Additionally, he was a member of Le Siècle, a French think tank. He also sat on the Board of Directors of the Fondation Ensemble and on the Ethics Committee of Fondapol.

He taught at the HEC Paris, the University of Paris, and his alma mater, the École Polytechnique. He also co-wrote a book.

He was the Chairman of Rothschild & Cie Banque (Paris) from 1995 to 1999. He was Vice Chairman of the European subsidiary of Banque privée Edmond de Rothschild. He also was chief executive officer of N. M. Rothschild & Sons. He was Vice Chairman of Rothschild Europe and Senior Advisor of Rothschild & Cie Banque. Additionally, he was on the Audit Committee of Publicis.

== Death ==
Worms died on 31 August 2020.

== Bibliography ==
- Gérard Worms, Jean Mothes, Méthodes modernes de l'économie appliquée (Dunod, 1974, 259 pages).
