= Lise Toubon =

French art expert (1933–2021)

- Born: Lise Jeanne Roberte Weiler; 2 November 1933; Metz, France
- Died: 1 March 2021 (aged 87)
- Occupation: art expert
- Spouse: Jacques Toubon

Lise Jeanne Roberte Weiler (2 November 1933 – 1 March 2021) was a French art expert. She became Knight of the Legion of Honour in 2010. Her husband was politician Jacques Toubon.
