= Jacques Toubon =

French politician and official

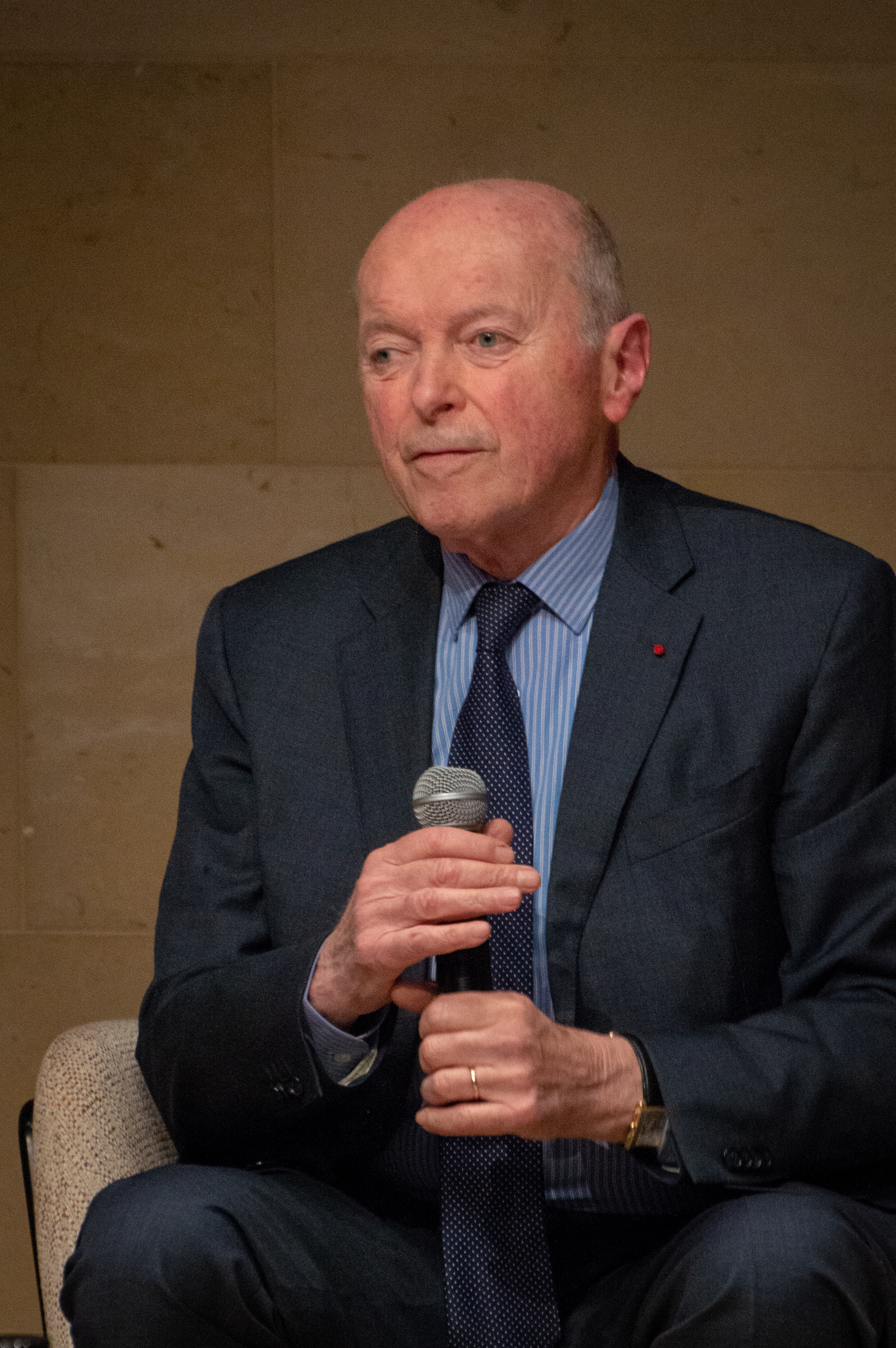
- Toubon in 2023

Defender of Rights
- In office 17 July 2014 – 16 July 2020
- President: François Hollande; Emmanuel Macron
- Preceded by: Dominique Baudis
- Succeeded by: Claire Hédon

Minister of Culture and Francophonie
- In office 30 March 1993 – 11 May 1995
- President: François Mitterrand
- Prime Minister: Édouard Balladur
- Preceded by: Jack Lang
- Succeeded by: Philippe Douste-Blazy

Keeper of the Seals, Minister of Justice
- In office 18 May 1995 – 2 June 1997
- President: Jacques Chirac
- Prime Minister: Alain Juppé
- Preceded by: Pierre Méhaignerie
- Succeeded by: Élisabeth Guigou

Mayor of the 13th arrondissement of Paris
- In office 13 March 1983 – 18 March 2001
- Preceded by: None
- Succeeded by: Serge Blisko

Member of the European Parliament
- In office 20 July 2004 – 13 July 2009
- Constituency: Île-de-France

Personal details
- Born: 21 June 1941 (age 85) Nice, France
- Party: RPR; UMP
- Spouse: Lise Weiler (died 2021)
- Education: Sciences Po Lyon; École nationale d'administration

Jacques Toubon (French: [ʒak tybɔ̃]; born 21 June 1941) is a French right-wing politician who held several major national and Parisian offices. He served as Defender of Rights, the country's official ombudsman, from 2014 to 2020.

== Political career ==
He was Minister of Culture for 1993–1995; and Keeper of the Seals, Minister of Justice : 1995–1997.

He was a Member of European Parliament : 2004–2009, Elected in 2004. He was a Member of the National Assembly for Paris : 1981–1993 (became minister in 1993), Elected in 1981, reelected in 1986, 1988, 1993.

He was Deputy-mayor of Paris : 1983–2001, reelected in 1989, 1995. Councillor of Paris : 1983–2008, reelected in 1989, 1995, 2001. Mayor of the 13th arrondissement of Paris : 1983–2001, reelected in 1989, 1995. Councillor of the 13th arrondissement of Paris : 1983–2001, reelected in 1989, 1995.

== Controversies ==
Toubon is known for the controversial so-called Toubon Law, enforcing the use of the French language in official French government publications, and advertisements published in France. Since the law can largely be described as being hostile to the English language, Toubon is sometimes referred to, jokingly, as "Mr. Allgood" ("All Good" being a translation of "Tout bon", a homophone of his surname).

He is also known for the "helicopter affair". In 1996, an initial criminal enquiry had been opened by Laurent Davenas, then head prosecutor of Évry for alleged misuse of government funds, in which Xavière Tiberi, the wife of then-mayor of Paris Jean Tiberi (from Toubon's party), was involved. However, this was not a full criminal investigation and no investigative magistrate had been named. Davenas then vacationed in the Himalayas. His deputy then announced his decision to open a full investigation. The Rally for the Republic leaders were frightened by the possible implications of such an investigation, and Toubon, then minister of justice, famously hired a helicopter to fetch Davenas and convince him to rein in his deputy; he refused.

Toubon has been the topic of much lampooning. In addition to "Mr Allgood", Les Guignols de l'info have referred to him as "M. Bouffon" ("Mr Buffoon").

In 2004, whilst a member of the European Parliament, he took objection to the Independence/Democracy group leader Nigel Farage revealing that the French European Commissioner, Jacques Barrot had been found guilty of embezzlement and barred from holding public office. Toubon started running up and down the aisle of the chamber demanding to speak on a point of order (which the President refused) due to Barrot's conviction having been wiped by a French presidential amnesty that made it illegal under French law to mention the original offence. Fellow MEP Robert Kilroy-Silk told him unless he spoke English, no-one would understand him in a reference to the Toubon law.

== Personal life ==
He was married to art expert Lise Toubon.

Political offices
Preceded by Jack Lang	Minister of Culture; 1993–1995	Succeeded by Philippe Douste-Blazy
Preceded by Pierre Méhaignerie	Minister of Justice; 1995–1997	Succeeded by Élisabeth Guigou
