= Jean-Baptiste Olivier (politician) =

French politician (born 1979)

Member of the Senate
- Incumbent
- Assumed office 22 October 2024
- Preceded by: Marie-Claire Carrère-Gée
- Constituency: Paris

Personal details
- Born: 1 August 1979 (age 46)
- Party: The Republicans

Jean-Baptiste Olivier (born 1 August 1979) is a French politician of The Republicans. He has been a member of the Senate since 2024, and a member of the Council of Paris since 2020. In the 2022 and 2024 legislative elections, he was a candidate for the National Assembly in Paris's 9th constituency.
