= Anne-Christine Lang =

French politician

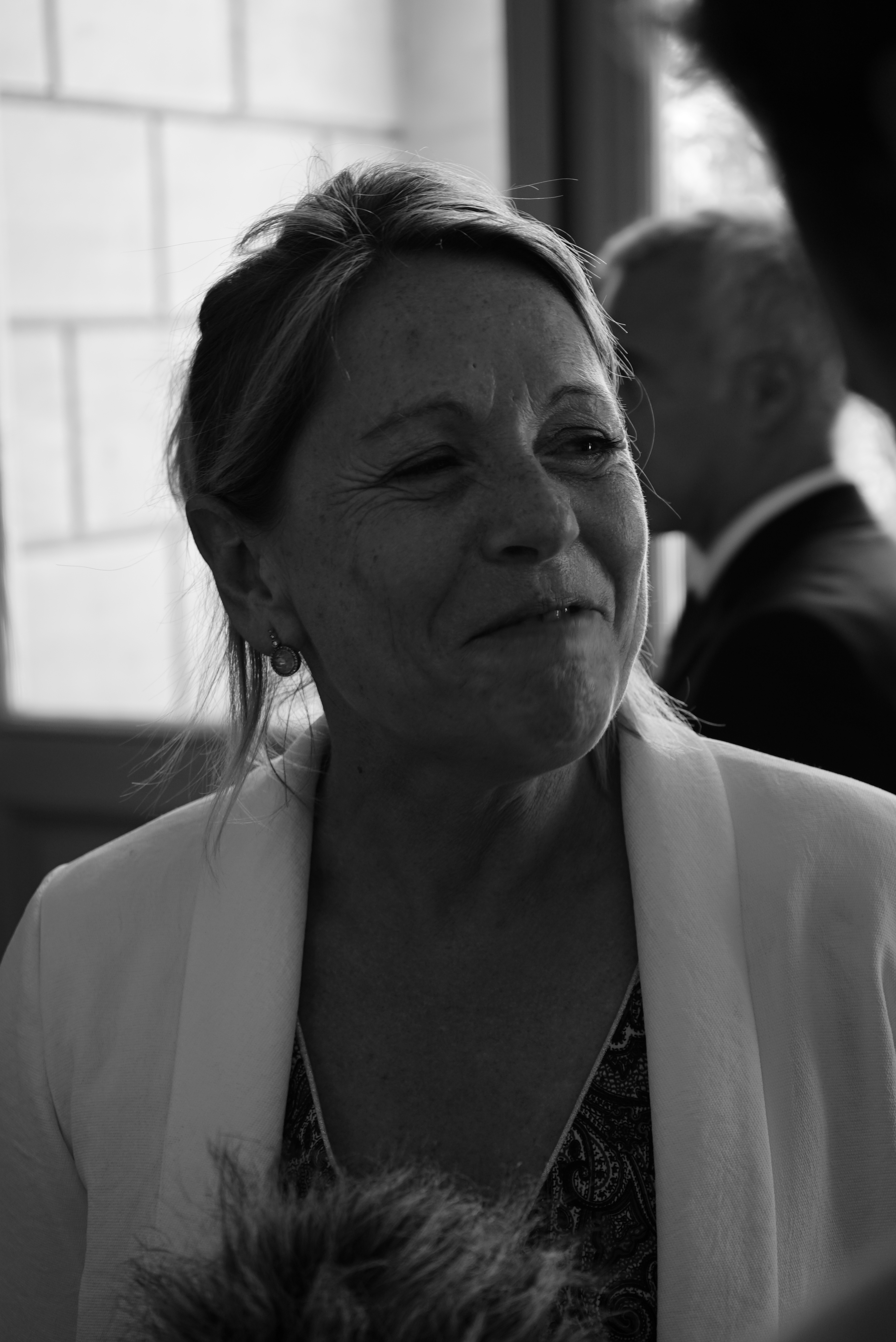

Member of the National Assembly for Paris's 10th constituency
- In office 21 June 2017 – 21 June 2022
- Preceded by: Denis Baupin
- Succeeded by: Rodrigo Arenas

Member of the National Assembly for Paris's 9th constituency
- In office 10 May 2014 – 17 June 2017
- Preceded by: Jean-Marie Le Guen
- Succeeded by: Buon Tan

Councillor of Paris
- In office 18 March 2001 – 28 June 2020
- Mayor: Bertrand Delanoë; Anne Hidalgo

Personal details
- Born: 10 August 1961 (age 64) Mont-de-Marsan, France
- Party: Socialist Party; La République En Marche! Territories of Progress

Anne-Christine Lang (born 10 August 1961) is a French politician who has been serving as a member of the National Assembly for Paris since 2014. A member of the Socialist Party (PS) until she joined La République En Marche! (LREM) in 2017, she first represented the 9th constituency as Jean-Marie Le Guen's substitute following his appointment as Secretary of State for Relations with Parliament by President François Hollande. In the 2017 legislative election, she ran in the neighbouring 10th constituency, which covers parts of the 13th and 14th arrondissements. Lang also served as a Councillor of Paris from 2001 until 2020.

== Political career ==
In Parliament, Lang serves as member of the Committee on Cultural Affairs and Education. In this capacity, she was – alongside Fannette Charvier – her parliamentary group's rapporteur on l'école de la confiance, legislation introduced by Minister of National Education Jean-Michel Blanquer to restructure the French education system from nursery through to middle school. In 2020, Lang joined En commun (EC), a group within LREM led by Barbara Pompili.

== Political positions ==
In July 2019, Lang decided not to align with her parliamentary group's majority and became one of 52 LREM members who abstained from a vote on the French ratification of the European Union’s Comprehensive Economic and Trade Agreement (CETA) with Canada.

For the 2020 Paris municipal election, Lang went against the party line and endorsed Cédric Villani over Benjamin Griveaux as candidate for the mayorship.

In September 2020, Lang initiated a walkout of National Assembly members in protest of a woman in a hijab addressing a parliamentary commission. Lang said that as a feminist she could not accept the "mark of submission". In February 2022, she went against the party line again and was one of six LREM legislators who supported the Republicans’ motion for a ban on wearing hijabs in sports competitions.

Amid the COVID-19 pandemic in France, Lang led a group of 41 LREM deputies in March 2021 who proposed that, in order to mitigate the public distrust of the Oxford–AstraZeneca vaccine, politicians volunteer to get vaccinated.

== Other activities ==
- Centre national des œuvres universitaires et scolaires (CNOUS), Member of the Board of Directors
- National Centre for Cinema and the Moving Image (CNC), Member of the Board of Directors

== See also ==
- 2017 French legislative election
