= French constitutional law of 23 July 2008 =

French constitutional amendment

The Constitutional law on the Modernisation of the Institutions of the Fifth Republic (French: loi constitutionnelle de modernisation des institutions de la V^{e} République) was enacted into French constitutional law by the Parliament of France in July 2008, to reform state institutions.

Inter alia, the law introduced a limit of two terms for the President of France, recognised regional languages as part of the nation's heritage, and established the position of Defender of Rights.

== History ==
Proposed in Nicolas Sarkozy's manifesto during the French presidential election of 2007, the stated goal of the changes was to modernise the institutions of the Fifth Republic. The Comité de réflexion et de proposition sur la modernisation et le rééquilibrage des institutions, (literally : "A committee of reflection and proposal on the modernisation and the re-balancing of the institutions"), presided over by Édouard Balladur, a former Prime Minister, was established in July 2007. It was composed primarily of constitutional jurists and political personalities with legal competence. Following three months of work, it submitted its report to the President of the Republic on 29 October 2007.

This resulted in a bill, which was approved by the National Assembly on 9 July 2008 and by the Senate on the 17th.

The bill re-evaluated the role of the executive and augmented the parliament's powers. Some of the proposals were not ratified, such as the introduction of proportional representation for elections of the National Assembly, the ban on dual mandates (cumul des mandats), nor the reform of representation in the Senate. Other clauses, such as a two-term limit for the President of the Republic, were added.

The final vote was submitted to Congress on 21 July 2008 and ratified by only one vote more than the required three-fifths (60%) majority of votes cast. The press drew attention to the aye vote of Jack Lang, who had broken with his party whip. The President of the National Assembly, Bernard Accoyer, also voted, which defied the tradition whereby the President of a sitting abstains from voting. Without those two votes the bill would not have passed.

The text of the law received the Great Seal of France on 1 October 2008.

== Amendments ==
In the following translation, where appropriate, a direct English equivalent of the French term is used. Otherwise, in order to make the terminology intelligible to at least some English speakers, terms used in the United Kingdom parliament are substituted. For example une assemblée is the equivalent of a house of the U.K. parliament. Only rarely, is equivalence complete. For example, the Senate of France is in only some respects the equivalent of the House of Lords.

- Article 1
  - addition of the following paragraph: "The law favours the equal access of women and men to electoral mandates and elective functions, just as to professional and social responsibilities".
- Article 3
  - suppression of the last paragraph: "The law favours the equal access of women and men to electoral mandates and elective functions".
- Article 4
  - replacement of the second paragraph by: "They contribute to the implementation of the principle enunciated in the second paragraph of the first article in conditions determined by the law".
  - addition of the following paragraph: "The law guarantees pluralist expressions of opinion and the equitable participation of parties and political groupings to the democratic life of the Nation".
- Article 6: Definition of president of the French Republic.
  - The president of the Republic may not henceforth exercise more than two consecutive periods in office.
- Article 11: referendums
  - The process of referendum may also be about questions of environmental order.
  - Possibility for one fifth of the members of Parliament, supported by one tenth of registered electors, to ask for the holding of a referendum on one of the subjects foreseen in this article. That request would constitute the object of a proposition of law, such that Parliament could oppose the holding of the referendum, from it to a reading of the text.
- Article 13: nominations by the Head of State.
  - Parliamentary commissions may oppose presidential nominations.
- Article 16: full powers of the Head of State.
  - Limitation of the exceptional power of the President of the Republic after 30 and 60 days of exercise in exceptional circumstances.
- Article 17: presidential pardons.
  - The right of pardon may no longer be exercised by the president of the Republic, except on an individual basis. Collective pardon is henceforward not possible.
- Article 18: communication by the president of the Republic with Parliament.
  - The president of the Republic may convene the Congress of the French parliament in order to make a declaration. A debate may follow his declaration, without his presence.
- Article 24: composition of Parliament.
  - The number of deputies and of senators is fixed by the constitution. French citizens resident abroad are henceforth represented in the Senate and in the National Assembly.
- Article 25: organisation of the election of members of Parliament.
  - Members of Parliament are replaced temporarily in case of acceptance by them of government office.
  - New paragraph: "An independent commission, of which the law fixes the composition and rules of organisation and working, publishes a decision by a public notice concerning parliamentary bills relating to text and propositions of law delimiting parliamentary constituencies for the election of deputies or modifying the distribution of seats of deputies or senators".
- Article 34: definition of the law.
  - The law henceforth determines the rules concerning "liberty, pluralism and the independence of the media".
  - The law henceforth determines the rules concerning the electoral regime of local authorities and of the representative authorities of French citizens established outside France as well as the conditions for exercising electoral mandates and electoral functions by members of local councils.
  - The penultimate paragraph is replaced by the following two paragraphs: "Laws on programming determining the purpose of the State's actions" and "long term tendencies of public finances are defined by the programming laws. They fall within the objective of balancing the accounts of public services".
  - An article 34-1 is added. It permits the assemblies to vote resolutions under conditions set by organic law, on condition that they should not call the government's responsibility into question, nor should they contain orders to the government.
  - The government should henceforth inform Parliament of any decision it may take to cause armed forces to intervene abroad, at the latest three days after the beginning of the intervention. It specifies the objectives pursued. This information may give rise to a debate not followed by a vote. When the intervention lasts more than four months, the government submits any prolongation to the authorisation of Parliament. In the last resort, it may ask the National Assembly to decide.
- Article 38: manner of functioning of the ordinances.
  - Ordinances may no longer be ratified other than in the formal manner.
- Article 42: Vote on the law
  - The discussion of the bills and propositions of law are no longer taken before the first assembly referred on the text presented by the government, but on the text adopted by the commission to which it is referred, with the exception of bills for constitutional revision, for finance law, and for financing social security.
  - A delay of six weeks should pass between the deposit of the bill or of the proposal and the discussion of the text, except in case of urgency
- Article 47-2: new article on the Court of Audit (Cour des comptes)
  - The Court of Audit assists Parliament in the control of the action of the government. It assists Parliament and the government in the control and execution of finance laws and the social security financing laws as well as in the evaluation of public policies. It helps to inform the electorate by publishing public reports.
  - The public administration accounts must be regular and sincere, and give a faithful picture of the results of their management, of their property and of their financial situation.
- Article 48: order of the day (order paper) of the assemblies (houses).
  - The assemblies now set their order papers themselves, independently of the government.
  - Two weeks of session out of four are reserved by priority, and in the order decided by the government, for the examination of texts and for debates which it asks to have written into the order paper.
  - The government may write into the order paper, by priority, the discussion of financial law bills, bills on social security financing laws and subject to reserve, texts sent by the other assembly at least six weeks before, bills relating to states of crisis and requests for authorization envisaged by article 35.
- Article 49 paragraph 3: mechanism for referring a bill back.
- Article 51-1: new article on the parliamentary groups
  - In each assembly, the rights of the parliamentary groups are henceforth set by their ruling.
  - This same ruling must recognize the specific rights of opposition groups of the relevant assembly as well as those of minority groups.
- Article 51-2: new article on commissions of enquiry
  - For the exercise of missions of control and evaluation, defined in the first paragraph of article 24, commissions of enquiry may now be created within each assembly in order to gather, under the conditions envisaged by the law, elements of information.
  - Their rules of organization and operation are determined by the law.
  - Their conditions of creation are determined by the ruling of each assembly.
- Article 61: constitutional recourse
  - Those responsible have henceforth, the possibility of contesting the constitutionality of a measure to which they are opposed, creating thereby the possibility of constitutional review a posteriori (reasoning from experience). Previously, the constitutionality of a law was reviewed solely a priori, without the benefit of practical experience of its application and the abuses potentially associated with it. It also provides the possibility of constitutional review with respect to jurisprudence that is, judicial precedent, an interpretation by one or more judges. Requests are however, screened by the Court of Cassation (supreme court of appeal) and by the Council of State which decide on sending the appeal to the Constitutional Council.
  - In the case of a referendum (see article 11), control of the law proposition by the Constitutional Council before its presentation to the people. This control concerns only law propositions, that is to say those of legislative provenance, and thus only new dispositions of article 11 introduced by the constitutional law of 23 July 2008. A proposal of law submitted to referendum will not therefore always be controlled (judgement of the Constitutional Council of 6 November 1962).
- Title XI: the Economic and Social Council becomes the Economic, social and Environmental Council.
  - Matters may now be presented to them in the form of a petition.
  - The government and Parliament may now consult it on any problem of an environmental character. Any plan or parliamentary bill on planning law, with an environmental character is henceforth, submitted to it for advice.
  - The number of members may not now exceed 233.
- Title XI b: The Defender of Rights is created with a new Article 71-1.
  - The Defender of Rights watches over respect for rights and liberties by state administrations, local authorities, public establishments, also by all organisations with a public service mission, or with regard to which organic law attributes competence.
  - Any citizen considering himself wronged in one of these areas may submit it as a matter of course.
  - He may be assisted by a college for the exercise of certain parts of his remit.
  - Nominated by the president of the Republic for a mandate of six years (non-renewable), he may not be part of the government nor of Parliament. He accounts for his activities to the latter and to the head of State.
- Article 75-1: new article
  - The regional languages form part of the French heritage.
- Article 87: new article on francophonie
  - The Republic participates henceforth in development of solidarity and cooperation between states and peoples which share the French language.
- Article 88-4: relations between the European Union and Parliament.
  - Each assembly should now have a commission charged with European affairs.
- Article 88-5: new state membership in the European Union.
  - Bills authorizing ratification of a treaty concerning the membership of a new state in the European Union are always submitted to a referendum by the president of the Republic. However, by the vote of a motion adopted in identical terms by each assembly, by a three-fifths majority, Parliament may henceforth authorize the adoption of a bill according to the procedure envisaged by the third paragraph of article 89.

== Details of the vote ==
The votes of the parliamentarians met in Congress were distributed as follows:

Proposed Constitutional Reform
Required majority →	538 out of 906
Yes votes	539 / 906
No votes	357 / 906
Abstentions	9 / 906
Did not vote	1 / 906

Votes of Members of the National Assembly
Party group	For	Against	Abstention	Non-voters	Total
Union for a Popular Movement	310	6	1	0	317
Socialist, Radical and Citizen	10	194	0	0	204
Democratic and Republican Left	0	24	0	0	24
New Centre	23	0	1	0	24
Non-Inscrits	1	6	0	0	7
TOTAL	344	230	2	0	576

Vote of the Senators
Party group	For	Against	Abstention	Non-voters	Total
Union for a Popular Movement	158	1	0	0	159
Socialist	0	95	0	0	95
Centrist Union-UDF	24	2	4	0	30
Communist, Republican and Citizen	0	23	0	0	23
RDSE	11	4	2	0	17
Non-Inscrits	2	2	1	1	6
TOTAL	195	127	7	1	330

== Bibliography ==
- (in French) Revue française de droit constitutionnel, La révision constitutionnelle de juillet 2008, n°78-2009/2
