= Claire Hédon =

French journalist (born 1962)

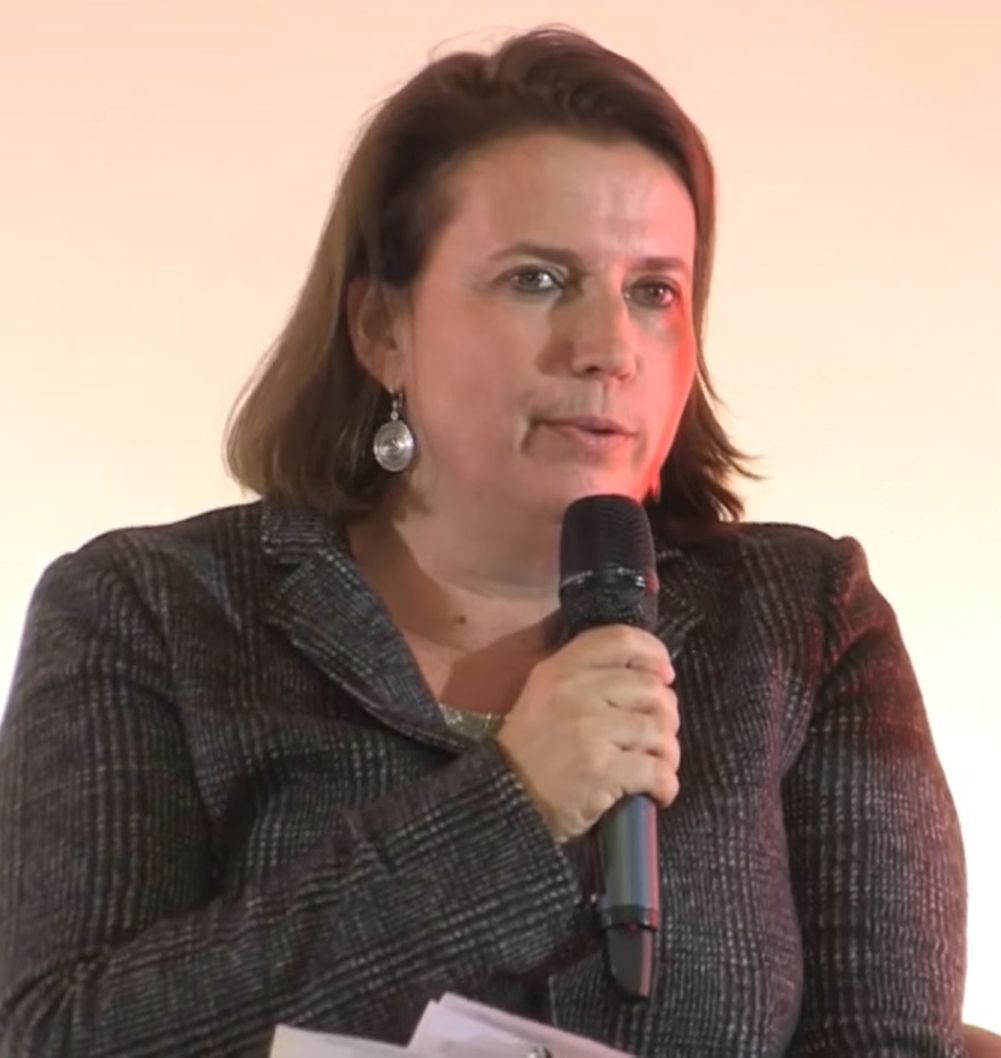

Defender of Rights
- Incumbent
- Assumed office 22 July 2020
- President: Emmanuel Macron
- Preceded by: Jacques Toubon

Personal details
- Born: 5 October 1962 (age 63) Paris, France
- Education: Panthéon-Assas University; CELSA Paris
- Profession: Journalist

Claire Hédon (French pronunciation: [klɛʁ edɔ̃]; born 5 October 1962) is a French journalist and activist who was appointed Defender of Rights in 2020 by President Emmanuel Macron.

== Early life ==
Claire Hédon was born on 5 October 1962 in Paris. She is the holder of a master's degree in law from Panthéon-Assas University. She also holds a master's degree in communication from CELSA Paris.

== Career ==
Hedon was appointed member of the Comité consultatif national d'éthique in 2017.

She became Defender of Rights in 2020. Socialist MP George Pau-Langevin was appointed her deputy.

Hédon returned to her positions on 16 February 2021 demanding better traceability to fight against discrimination.

=== Positions ===
From the beginning of her tenure as Defender, Claire Hédon publicly opposed certain provisions of the proposed law on global security. On 6 July 2022 the Defender of Rights, during a hearing at the Senate, raised concerns about the increase in complaints from users related to the digitization of public services. This would cause a growing distance between citizens and institutions, particularly affecting the most vulnerable citizens.

==== Facial recognition ====
In October 2022, the Defender of Rights expressed her concerns regarding the development of biometric technologies such as facial recognition and called for swift legislation on the issue to protect the fundamental rights of citizens.

==== Child welfare ====
In November 2022, she took it upon herself to address the situation faced by child welfare services in the Nord and Somme regions. She declared it a "dramatic situation" that compelled her to take action.

==== Immigration ====
In February 2023, she criticized the immigration bill proposed by the Borne government, stating that it would "significantly undermine the fundamental rights and freedoms of foreigners." However, according to Claire Hédon, "in reality, the potential sentences are much higher than the actual sentences handed down, which means that the removal of protections against deportation will affect a wide range of individuals for whom the severity of the threat to public order will be far from established."

==== Police brutality ====
Claire Hédon spoke out in the context of pension reform and police violence, which she had witnessed. She denounced "unacceptable" and "extremely shocking" images. In 2020, she had already criticized the IGPN (General Inspectorate of the National Police) by asserting that the requests for judicial proceedings made by the Defender of Rights were never followed up by the police institution.
