= Édouard Balladur =

Prime Minister of France from 1993 to 1995

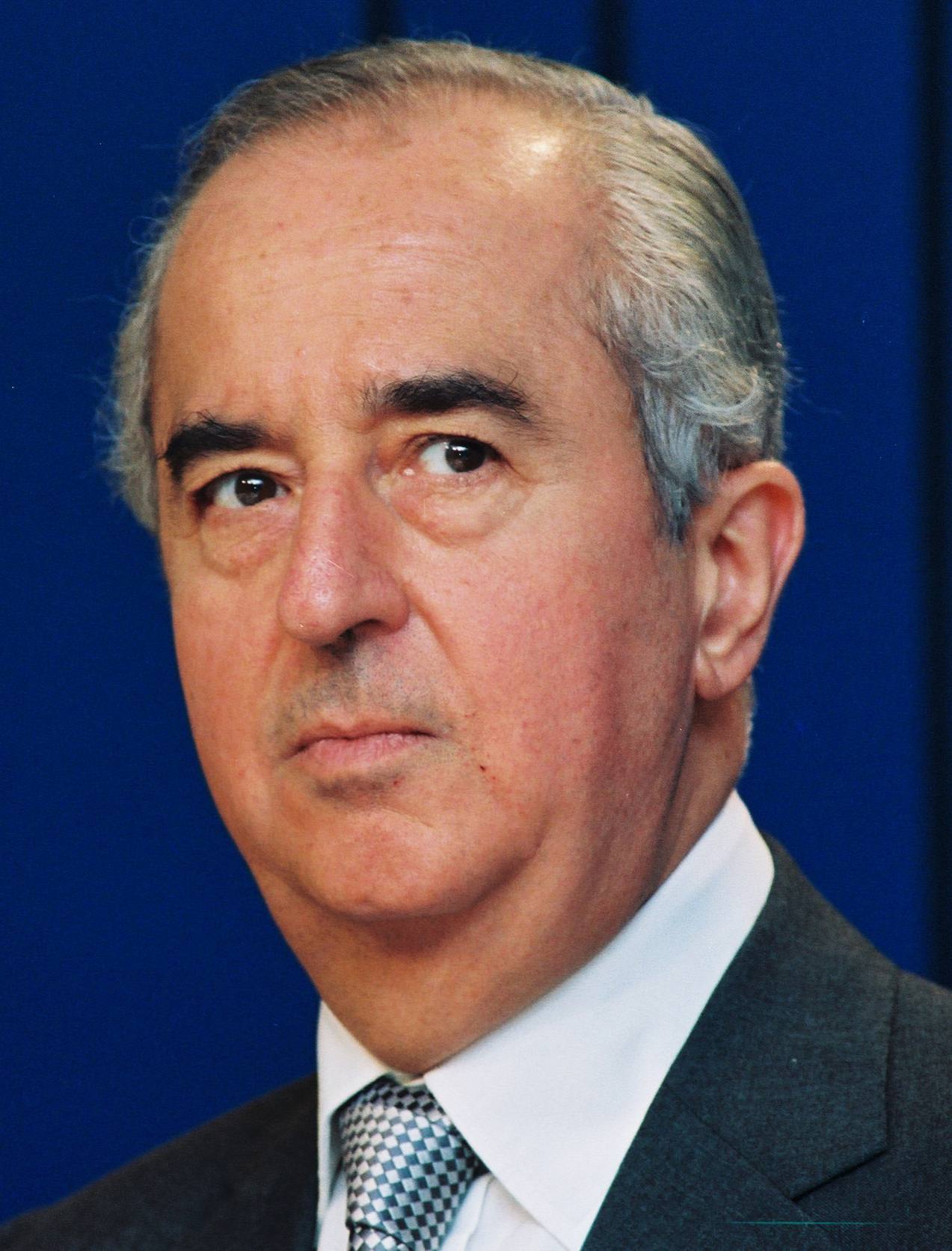
- Balladur in 1993

Prime Minister of France
- In office 29 March 1993 – 17 May 1995
- President: François Mitterrand
- Preceded by: Pierre Bérégovoy
- Succeeded by: Alain Juppé

Minister of State, Minister of the Economy, Finance and Privatisation
- In office 20 March 1986 – 12 May 1988
- Prime Minister: Jacques Chirac
- Preceded by: Pierre Bérégovoy
- Succeeded by: Pierre Bérégovoy

Secretary-General to the President
- In office 5 April 1973 – 2 April 1974
- President: Georges Pompidou
- Preceded by: Michel Jobert
- Succeeded by: Bernard Beck

Personal details
- Born: Édouard Léon Raoul Balladur; 2 May 1929 İzmir, Turkey
- Died: 31 August 2026 (aged 97) Paris, France
- Resting place: Passy Cemetery, Paris
- Party: LR
- Other political affiliations: UNR (1964–1967); UDR (1967–1976); RPR (1976–2002); UMP (2002–2015)
- Spouse: Marie-Josèphe Delacour (m. 1957; died 2025)
- Children: 4
- Education: Aix-Marseille University; Paris Institute of Political Studies; École nationale d'administration

Édouard Léon Raoul Balladur ([edwaʁ baladyʁ]; 2 May 1929 – 31 August 2026) was a French politician who served as prime minister under François Mitterrand from 29 March 1993 to 17 May 1995. He had previously served as minister of finance from 1986 to 1988 during Jacques Chirac's government. He was considered to be center-right and a technocrat, and identified as a Gaullist throughout his political career.

After Chirac declined to return as prime minister, Mitterrand appointed Balladur as prime minister. His tenure as prime minister was largely defined by France's role in the 1994 Rwandan genocide and in the Karachi affair. Considered to be a protégé of Chirac at first, Balladur unsuccessfully ran against him for president in the 1995 presidential election, coming in third place.

Balladur was elected to the National Assembly in 2002 before retiring from politics in 2007. During this time, he was considered to be a mentor to President Nicolas Sarkozy.

== Early life ==
Édouard Léon Raoul Balladur was born in İzmir, Turkey, on 2 May 1929, to a Levantine family of Armenian ancestry with longstanding ties to France. The family, with five children, emigrated to Marseille in the mid-to-late 1930s.

Balladur was educated at Aix-Marseille University, Sciences Po and the École nationale d'administration.

In 1957, following his graduation from the École nationale d'administration, Balladur married Marie-Josèphe Delacour, with whom he had four sons. Delacour died in December 2025, at the age of 91.

== Early political career ==
Balladur started his political career in 1964 as an adviser to the Prime Minister, Georges Pompidou. After Pompidou's election as president in 1969 Balladur was appointed under-secretary-general of the presidency then secretary-general from 1973 to Pompidou's death in 1974. Throughout his career, he identified with Gaullist ideology.

From 1968 to 1980 Balladur was president of the French Mont Blanc Tunnel company while occupying various other positions in ministerial staff. From 1977 to 1986 he was president of Générale de Service Informatique (later merged into IBM Global Services).

=== Chirac government ===
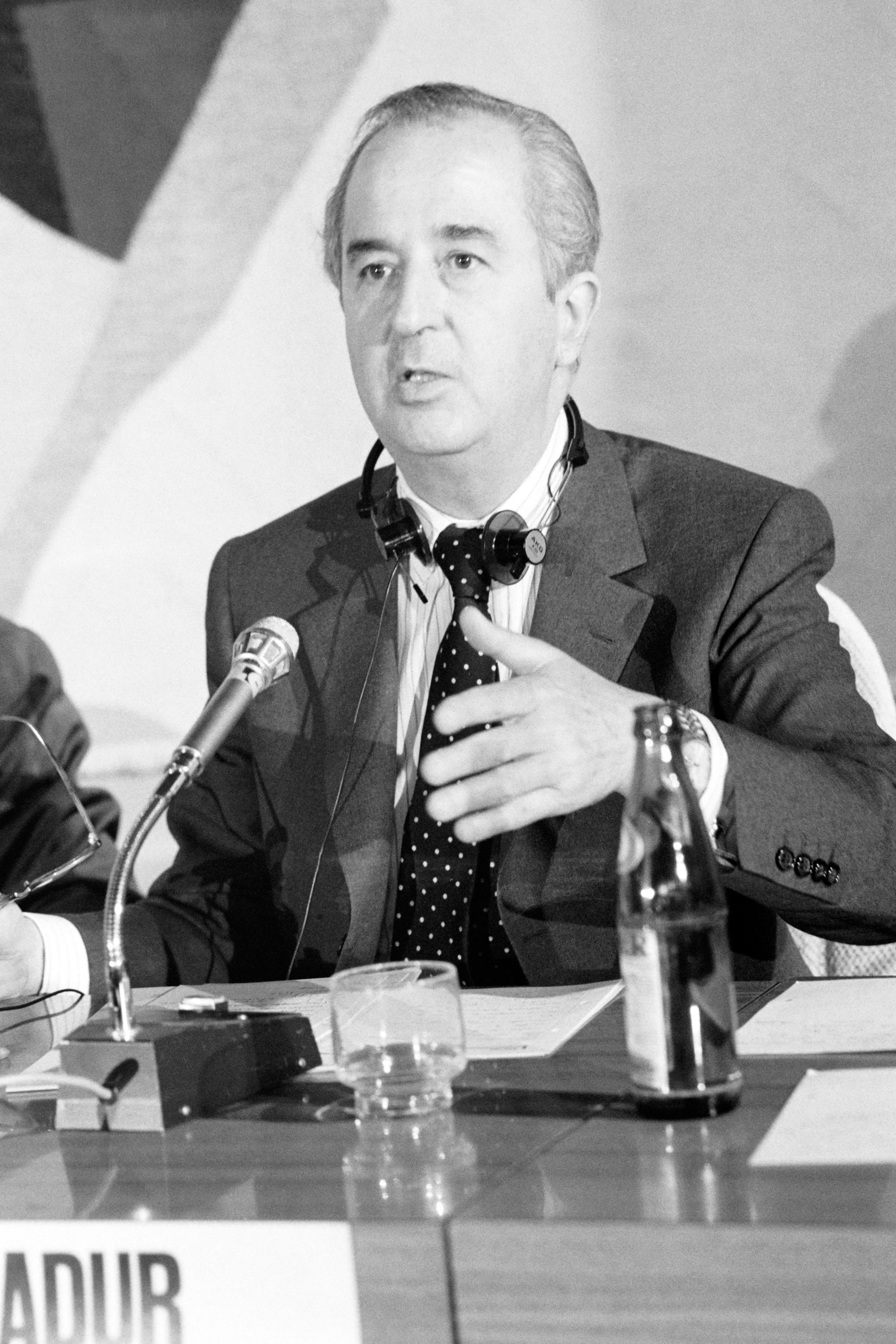
Edouard Balladur at the International Management Symposium in 1989

Balladur returned to politics in the 1980s as a supporter of Jacques Chirac and was eventually considered to be Chirac's protégé. A member of the Neo-Gaullist Rally for the Republic (RPR) party, he was the theoretician behind the "cohabitation government" from 1986 to 1988, explaining that if the right won the legislative election it could govern with Chirac as prime minister without Socialist Party President François Mitterrand's resignation.

As minister of economy and finance he implemented a liberal economic policy reminiscent of the one attributed to Ronald Reagan and Margaret Thatcher. He thus implemented a major privatisation programme, involving several companies that had been nationalized in 1945 and 1982, such as the Compagnie Financière de Suez, Paribas and the Société Générale. He also privatized TF1 and reduced the number of civil servants and state expenditure.

== Prime minister ==
When the RPR/UDF coalition won the 1993 legislative election, Chirac declined to become prime minister again in a second "cohabitation" with President Mitterrand, and Balladur became prime minister. He was faced with a difficult economic situation, but he did not want to make the political errors of the previous cohabitation government. He continued the economic policy he had undertaken in 1986 by carrying out new privatisations (notably Rhône-Poulenc, Banque Nationale de Paris and Elf). During his career, he was noted for having created the image of a quiet conservative, while conservatives saw that Balladur was able to appeal to the French elite given his education background. He was noted as a centre-right technocrat throughout his career, especially during his time as prime minister.

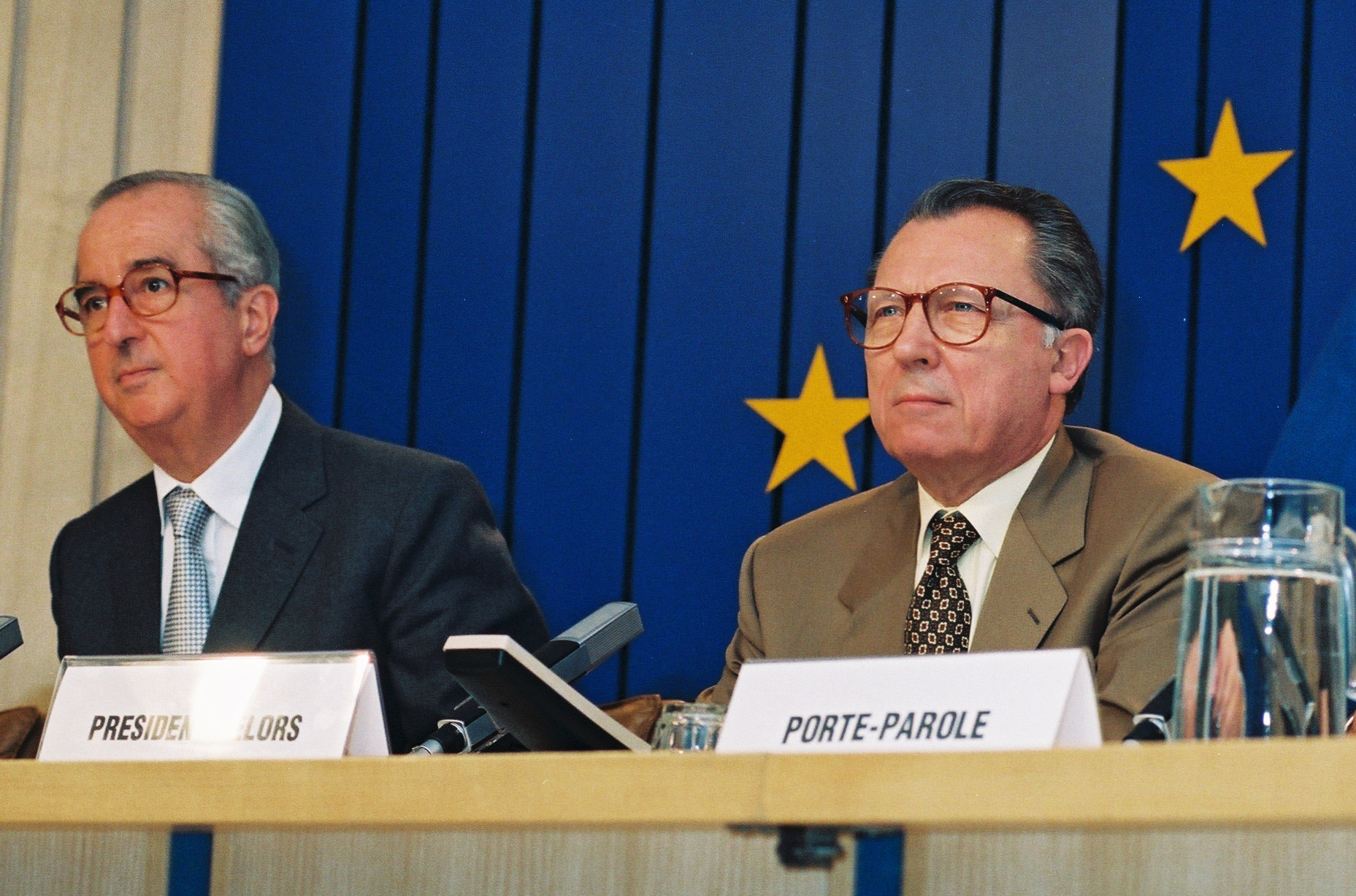
Balladur with European Commission President Jacques Delors in 1993

Balladur disagreed with François Mitterrand by considering that nuclear tests were necessary to maintain the credibility of the French deterrent. His tenure as prime minister was also noted for his defence of French forces in Rwanda during the Rwandan genocide. Later, he became involved in the Karachi affair, in which investigators came to suspect that kickbacks from arms deals had been used to help finance Balladur's 1995 presidential campaign.

Despite corruption affairs affecting some of his ministers, whom he forced to resign (thus lending his name to the so-called "Balladur jurisprudence"), he had the support of influential media.

During his time as prime minister, 72% of his government ministers were members of the think tank Le Siècle.

=== 1995 presidential election ===
When he became prime minister, Balladur had promised Chirac that he would not enter the 1995 presidential election, and that he would support Chirac's candidacy. However, a number of right-wing politicians advised Balladur to run for the presidency in 1995. He went back on his promise to Chirac and entered the campaign. At the time of Balladur's announcement, he was considered to be the front-runner of the election, having led in opinion polling. During the campaign, Balladur and Chirac competed to gain Gaullist voters. Some Gaullists viewed Balladur favorably as prime minister, however preferred that he remained as prime minister.

In the first round of the election, Balladur finished in third place with 18.6% of the vote behind the Socialist candidate Lionel Jospin and Chirac. He was thus eliminated from the final run-off election between the top two candidates, which Chirac won. Chirac immediately appointed Alain Juppé to replace Balladur as prime minister.

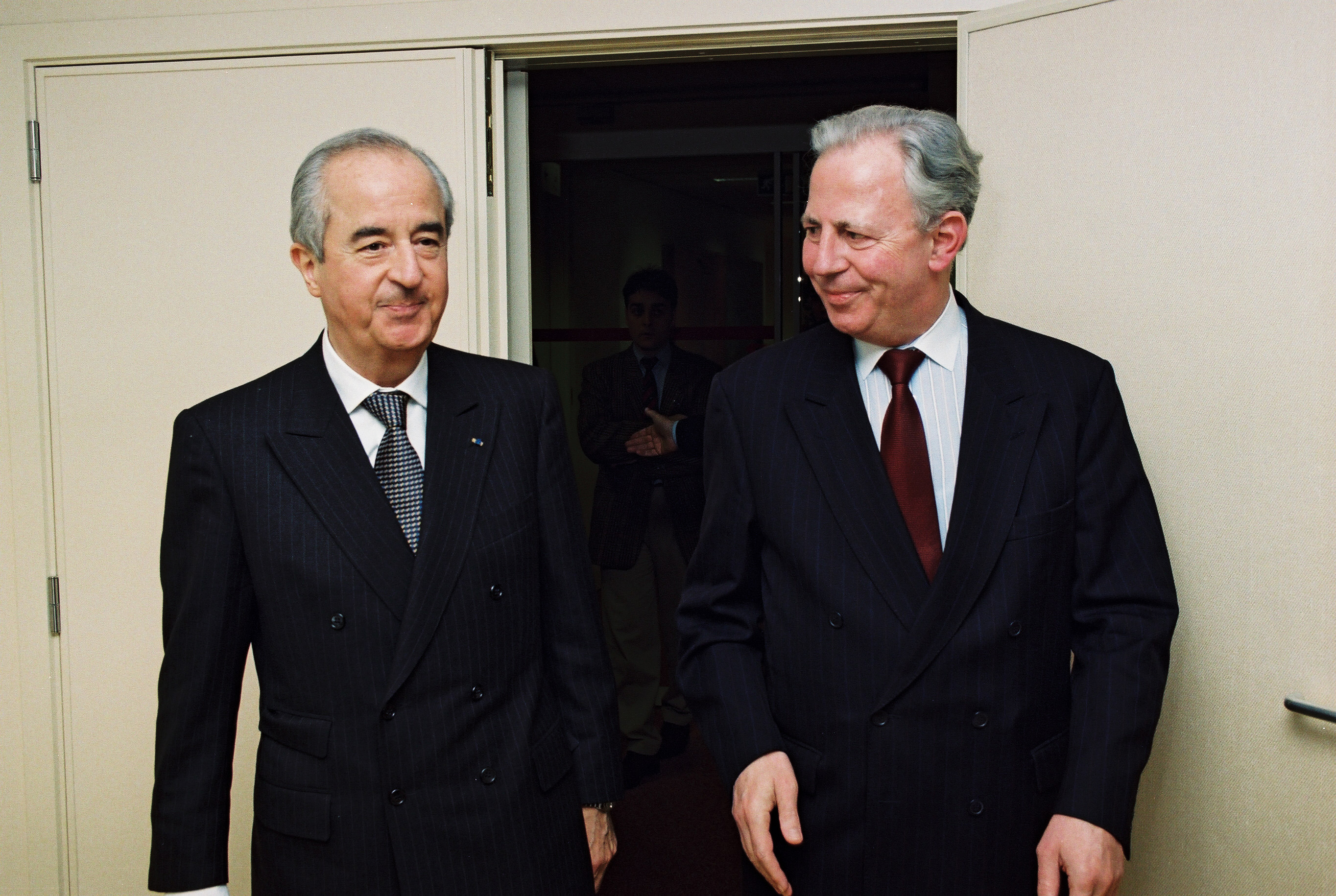
Balladur with European Commission President Jacques Santer in 1996

=== "Karachi affair" ===
Investigative forensic accounting enabled by the leaked Panama Papers revealed aspects of the Karachi affair, also dubbed "Karachigate", with the French Ministry of Justice examining whether armament contract commissions paid by Saudi Arabia, then Pakistan, financed the 1995 presidential campaigns of Balladur or Chirac, whose administration then succeeded in taking office. In May 2017, Balladur and his former defence minister François Léotard were each charged, in relation to the Pakistan deal, with "complicity in misuse of corporate assets and concealment". In June 2019, Balladur's former campaign manager, Nicolas Bazire, was one of six men convicted over the arms deal, and was sentenced to three years imprisonment for using "illegal funds" in Balladur's 1995 campaign. On 4 March 2021, Balladur was acquitted by the Court of Justice of the Republic, a special court that tries members of the government for actions performed in the exercise of their functions.

== National Assembly ==
Balladur served as the Chair of the National Assembly in 2002. He presided over the National Assembly's foreign affairs committee during his last parliamentary term (2002–2007). From the 1980s on, he had advocated the unification of the right-wing groupings into a single large party, but it was Chirac who managed the feat, with the creation of the Union for a Popular Movement in 2002.

Following a 1999 deadly accident in the Mont Blanc Tunnel, he gave evidence to the court judging the case in 2005 about the security measures he had or had not taken. Balladur claimed that he always took security seriously, but that it was difficult to agree on anything with the Italian company operating the Italian part of the tunnel.

Following the 2007 presidential election, Nicolas Sarkozy nominated Balladur to the head of a committee for institutional reforms. The constitutional revision was approved by the Parliament in July 2008. Sarkozy was considered to be Balladur's protégé with Sarkozy having been an ardent supporter of Balladur during his 1995 presidential campaign.

In 2006, Balladur announced that he would not run again for re-election in 2007 as a member of Parliament for the 15th arrondissement of Paris, a conservative stronghold.

== Later activities ==
In 2008 Balladur visited the United States to speak at an event organized by the Streit Council, a Washington-based think tank. Balladur presented his latest book, in which he outlined a concept for a "Union of the West".

Balladur was often caricatured as aloof, aristocratic and arrogant in media such as the Canard Enchaîné weekly and the Les Guignols de l'info TV show. Incidentally, the percentage of French government ministers who were also members of Le Siècle peaked at 72% under Balladur's prime ministership.

== Death ==
Balladur died on 31 August 2026 in Paris, at the age of 97. His death was announced by Prime Minister Sébastien Lecornu. Following his death, President Emmanuel Macron called Balladur a "demanding, level-headed, and devoted public servant".

== Honours and decorations ==
=== National honours ===
Ribbon bar	Honour	Date and comment
Legion Honneur GO ribbon	Grand Officer of the National Order of the Legion of Honour	2008
	Grand Cross of the National Order of Merit	1993
Medaille commemorative des Operations de securite et de Maintien de l'ordre ribbon	North Africa Security and Order Operations Commemorative Medal	1965

=== Foreign honours ===
Ribbon bar	Country	Honour	Date
	Holy See	Commander of the Order of Saint Sylvester	1967
Ribbon bar of the Decoration of Honour for Services to the Republic of Austria, Grand Decoration of Honour in Gold with Star	Austria	Grand Decoration of Honour in Gold with Star of the Decoration of Honour for Services to the Republic of Austria	1972
	Italy	Knight Grand Cross of the Order of Merit of the Italian Republic	1973
Ordre de l'Ouissam Alaouite GC ribbon (Maroc)	Morocco	Grand Cordon of the Order of Ouissam Alaouite	1993
	Tunisia	Grand Cordon of the National Order of Merit of Tunisia	1994
	Poland	Grand Cross of the Order of Merit of the Republic of Poland	2005

== Filmography ==
- 2011: Mort d'un président by Pierre Aknine: played by Cyrille Eldin

== Bibliography ==
- For a Union of the West, 2009, Hoover Institution Press, ISBN 978-0-8179-4932-7.

Political offices
Preceded by Michel Jobert	Secretary-General to the President; 1973–1974	Succeeded by Bernard Beck; Acting
Preceded by Pierre Bérégovoy	Minister of the Economy, Finance and Privatisation; 1986–1988	Succeeded by Pierre Bérégovoy
Preceded by Pierre Bérégovoy	Prime Minister of France; 1993–1995	Succeeded by Alain Juppé
