= Presstalis =

French former media distribution corporation

- Company type: Société par actions simplifiée
- Industry: Media distribution
- Founded: 16 April 1947
- Headquarters: Paris, France
- Key people: Anne-Marie Couderc (CEO)
- Revenue: 2.7 billion euros (2007)
- Number of employees: 910
- Website: www.presstalis.fr

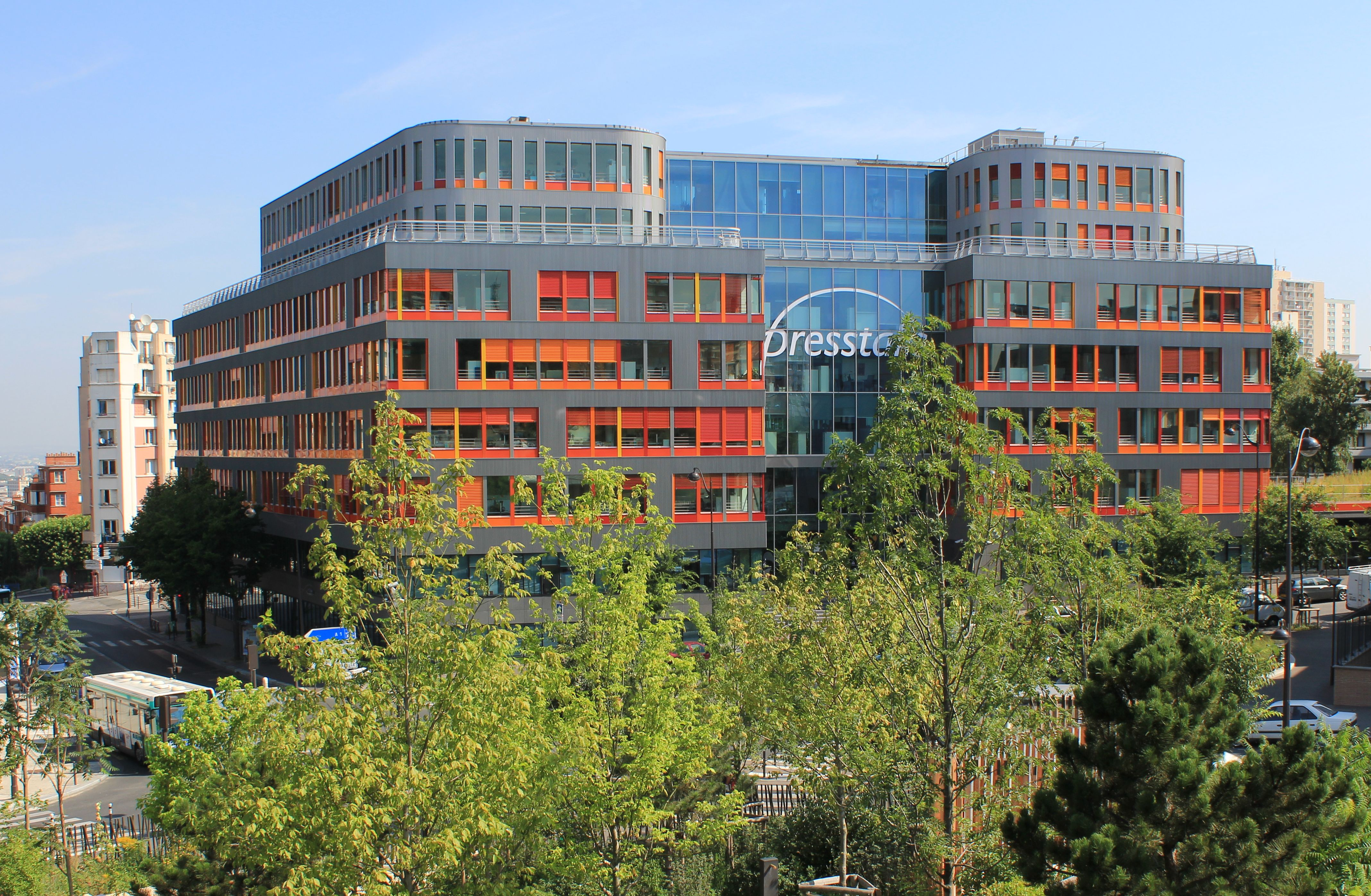
New Presstalis headquarters, located in the Porte des Lilas area in Paris.

Presstalis, known until December 2009 as Nouvelles Messageries de la Presse Parisienne (NMPP), is a French media distribution corporation. More than 100 newspapers and 3,500 French and foreign magazines are distributed by Presstalis. The company distributes many of the national newspapers of France and nearly 80% of its magazines and multimedia products, using depositories (distribution in France), independent subsidiaries, or local distributors (export distribution).

It is now bankrupt and has ceased operations as of July 1, 2020. Some of its assets will transfer into a new distribution company, France Messagerie.

NMPP was founded on 16 April 1947 according to the loi Bichet. The objective, after the Liberation of France, was to guarantee an economically viable distribution of newspapers.
