= Jean-Marie Le Guen =

French politician

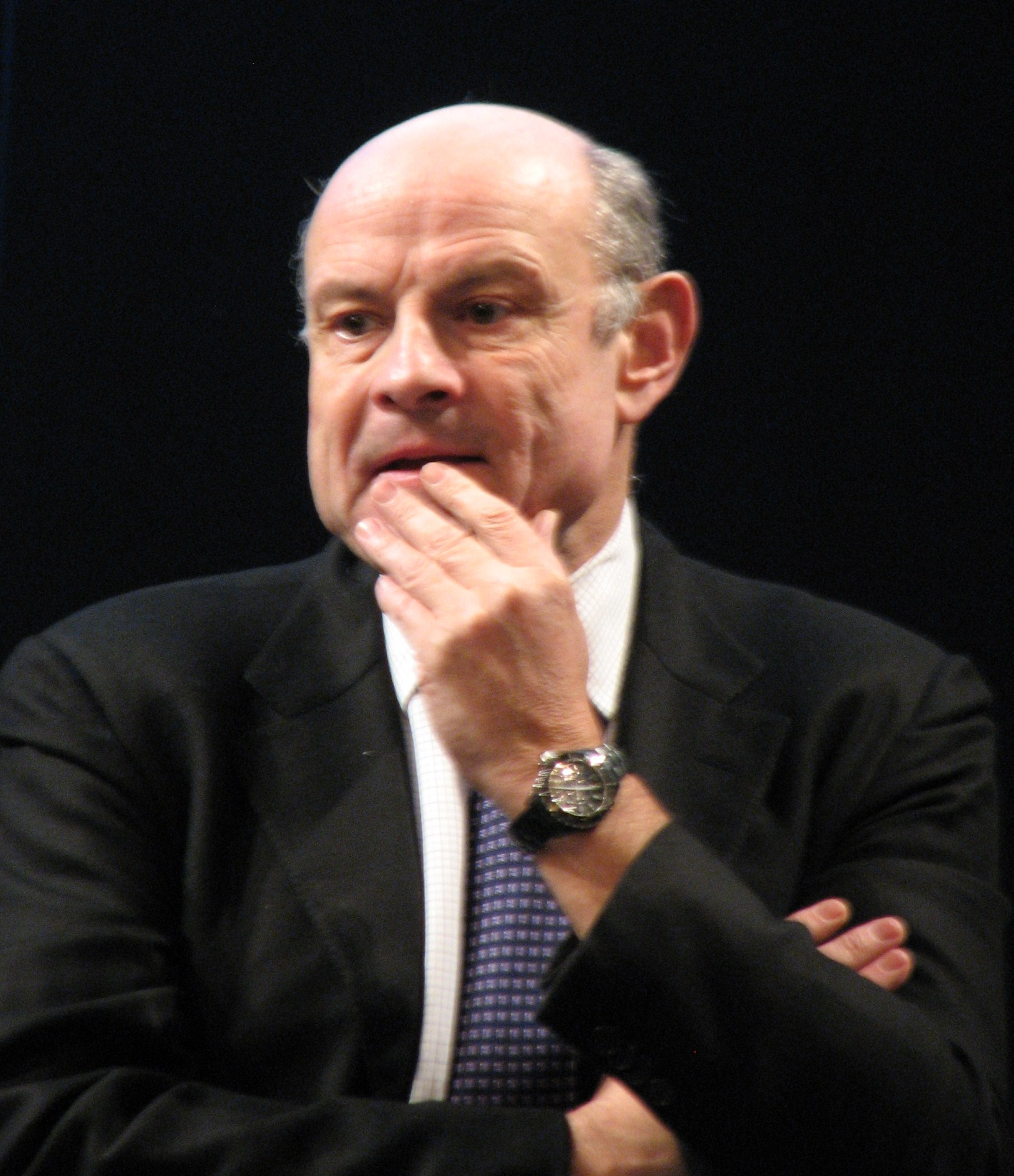

Secretaty of State for Francophonie
- In office 6 December 2016 – 17 May 2017
- President: François Hollande
- Prime Minister: Bernard Cazeneuve
- Preceded by: André Vallini

Councillor of Paris
- In office 18 March 2008 – 28 June 2020
- Mayor: Bertrand Delanoë; Anne Hidalgo

Member of the National Assembly for Paris's 9th constituency
- In office 1997–2014
- Preceded by: Paul Quilès
- Succeeded by: Anne-Christine Lang

Personal details
- Born: 3 January 1953 (age 73) Paris, France
- Party: Socialist Party
- Education: Panthéon-Sorbonne University
- Profession: Physician

Jean-Marie Le Guen (born 3 January 1953) is a French physician, public health expert and politician of the Socialist Party (PS) who served as a member of the National Assembly from 1997 until 2014, representing the 13th arrondissement of Paris. From 2014 until 2016, he served as Secretary of State for Relations with Parliament in the government of Prime Minister Manuel Valls.

== Early life ==
Le Guen was born on 3 January 1953, in Paris, France.

== Politica career ==
=== Career in local politics ===
- 29 July 1988 – 16 December 1992 : Deputy
- 20 March 1989 – 18 June 1995 : Member of the general council of Paris
- 20 March 1989 – 18 June 1995 : Member of the council of Paris
- 23 March 1992 – 25 June 1997 : Member of the regional council of Île-de-France
- 19 June 1995 – 18 March 2001 : Member of the general council of Paris
- 19 June 1995 – 18 March 2001 : Member of the council of Paris

=== Member of the National Assembly, 1997–2014 ===
Le Guen was first elected to the National Assembly in the 1997 French legislative election. In parliament, he served on the Committee on Economic Affairs from 2002 until 2012.

On 17 June 2007, Le Guen was reelected as deputy for the XIIIth legislature (2007–2012), in the 9th district of Paris (part of the 13th arrondissement (which includes the neighborhoods of Gare, Salpêtrière, and the part of Maison- Blanche situated to the east of a line defined by the streets avenue d'Italie et avenue de la Porte-d'Italie)) with 22108 votes (62.57%).

On 26 June 2007, Le Guen was elected as vice-president of the National Assembly, under the leadership its president Bernard Accoyer. Within the Socialist Party's parliamentary group, he was responsible for matters of health. In his capacity as chairman of a study group on obesity in the National Assembly, he was the author, in collaboration with Marc Horwitz, of "Obesity: The New French Sickness", published by Armand Colin in March 2005. He also chaired a parliamentary task force on the avian influenza, and is vice-president of the parliamentary office of the evaluation of health policy, as well as a titular member of the High Council for the Future of Health Insurance.

In addition to his committee assignments, Le Guen was part of the French delegation to the Inter-Parliamentary Union (IPU) from 2007 until 2012.

From 2008, under Mayor of Paris Bertrand Delanoë, Le Guen also served as assistant to the mayor in charge of public health and relations with the Assistance publique - Hôpitaux de Paris (AP-HP). He also chaired the administrative council for the AP-HP.

In the Socialist Party's primaries in 2017, Le Guen publicly criticized Benoît Hamon and instead endorsed Manuel Valls as the party's candidate for the presidential elections later that year.

== Life after politics ==
In June 2017, Le Guen joined French insurance brokerage firm Siaci Saint-Honoré as advisor to the group's chairman Pierre Donnersberg. In addition, he holds the other positions, including:

- Swissport, Member of the Board of Directors (since 2019)
- Gategroup, Member of the Board of Directors (since 2019)
- Huawei France, Member of the Board of Directors (since 2020)

Le Guen also worked for Compagnie Financière Edmond de Rothschild.

== Political positions ==
In 2004, Le Guen advised the government to consider increasing alcohol taxes as one way of helping to cut a health budget overrun. In 2016, he called for renewed debate over the decriminalisation of cannabis in France, arguing that "prohibition is not effective."
