= Denis Baupin =

French political figure

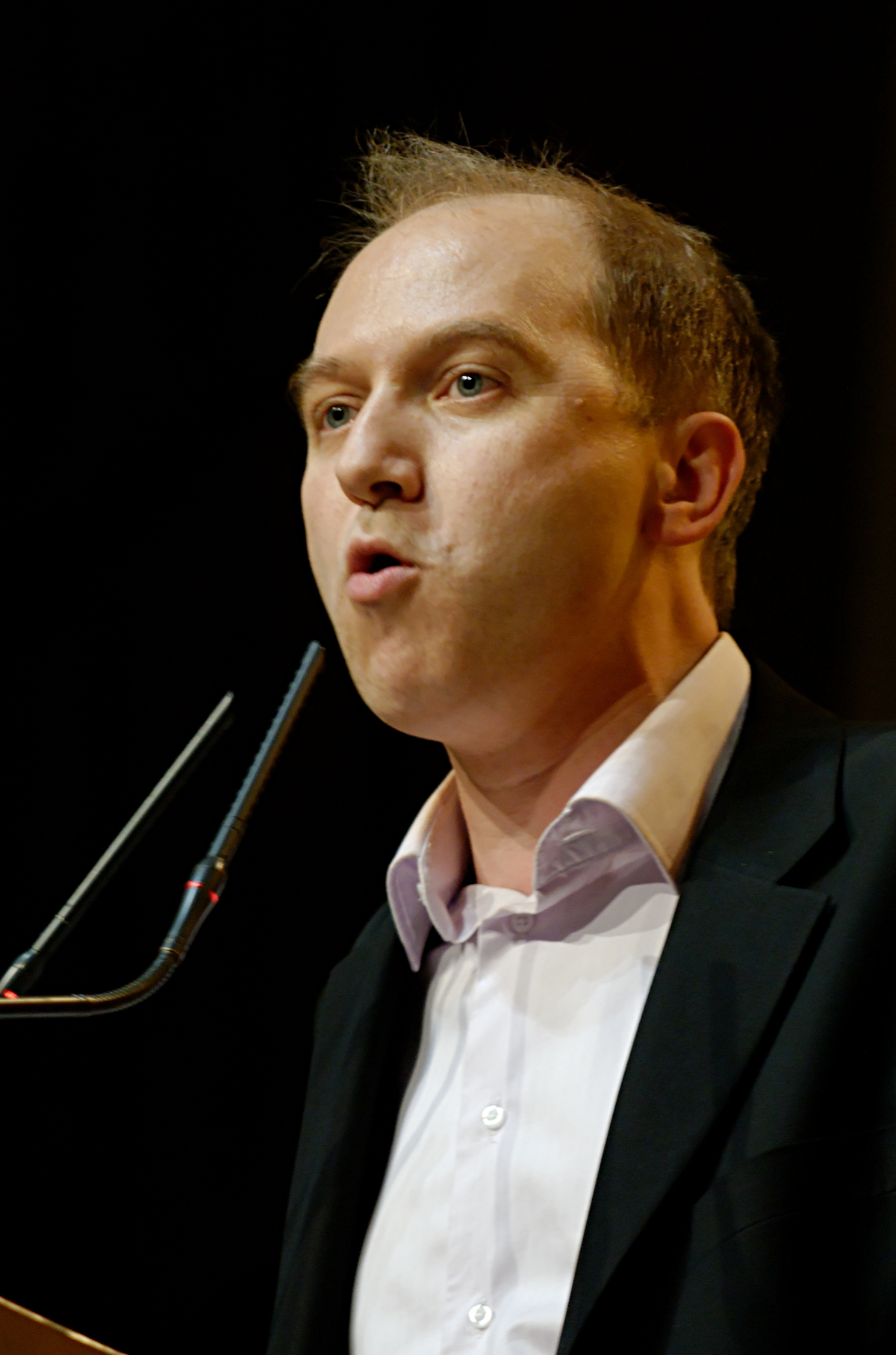
- Denis Baupin in April 2007

Member of the National Assembly for Paris's 10th constituency
- In office 22 June 2012 – 21 June 2017
- Preceded by: Yves Cochet
- Succeeded by: Anne-Christine Lang

Personal details
- Born: 2 June 1962 (age 64) Cherbourg, France
- Party: Europe Ecology – The Greens
- Spouse: Emmanuelle Cosse (m. 2015)
- Education: École Centrale Paris

Denis Baupin (born 2 June 1962 in Cherbourg) is a French political figure. He was Deputy Mayor of the City of Paris, where, as an elected member of the city council, he represents Europe Écologie–The Greens.

He is now vice mayor responsible for the city's programs and initiatives in the areas of sustainable development, environment and climate change.

On 10 May 2016, he resigned as Deputy Speaker of the National Assembly after being accused of sexual harassment by several female party members; he denies the allegations.

== Background ==
In 1984 Baupin graduated with an engineering degree from Paris's École Centrale Paris, subsequently became director of the international NGO "Terre des hommes" ("Planet of mankind").

A member of the Green Party since 1989, he served as council to the then-leader of the French Greens, Dominique Voynet, in the European Parliament, and in 1997 as special adviser to the French Ministry of Territorial Management. Since 1995 he has been an elected official of the 20th arrondissement of Paris.

Baupin has been a strong supporter of cooperation between the Greens and the French Socialist Party. This coalition has jointly governed the city since 2001 and has been at the heart of the city's greening as well as a variety of other social, economic and environmental initiatives.

In March 2007 he was designated by the Green Party to lead the campaign for the 2008 municipal elections.

In 2016 he was accused by several women in his party of sexual harassment. That scandal led to his decision to leave his position.

== Publications ==
- Tout voiture, no future, ("All cars, no future"), L'Archipel, 2007. - ISBN 978-2-84187-920-5
