= List of mayors of Clermont-Ferrand =

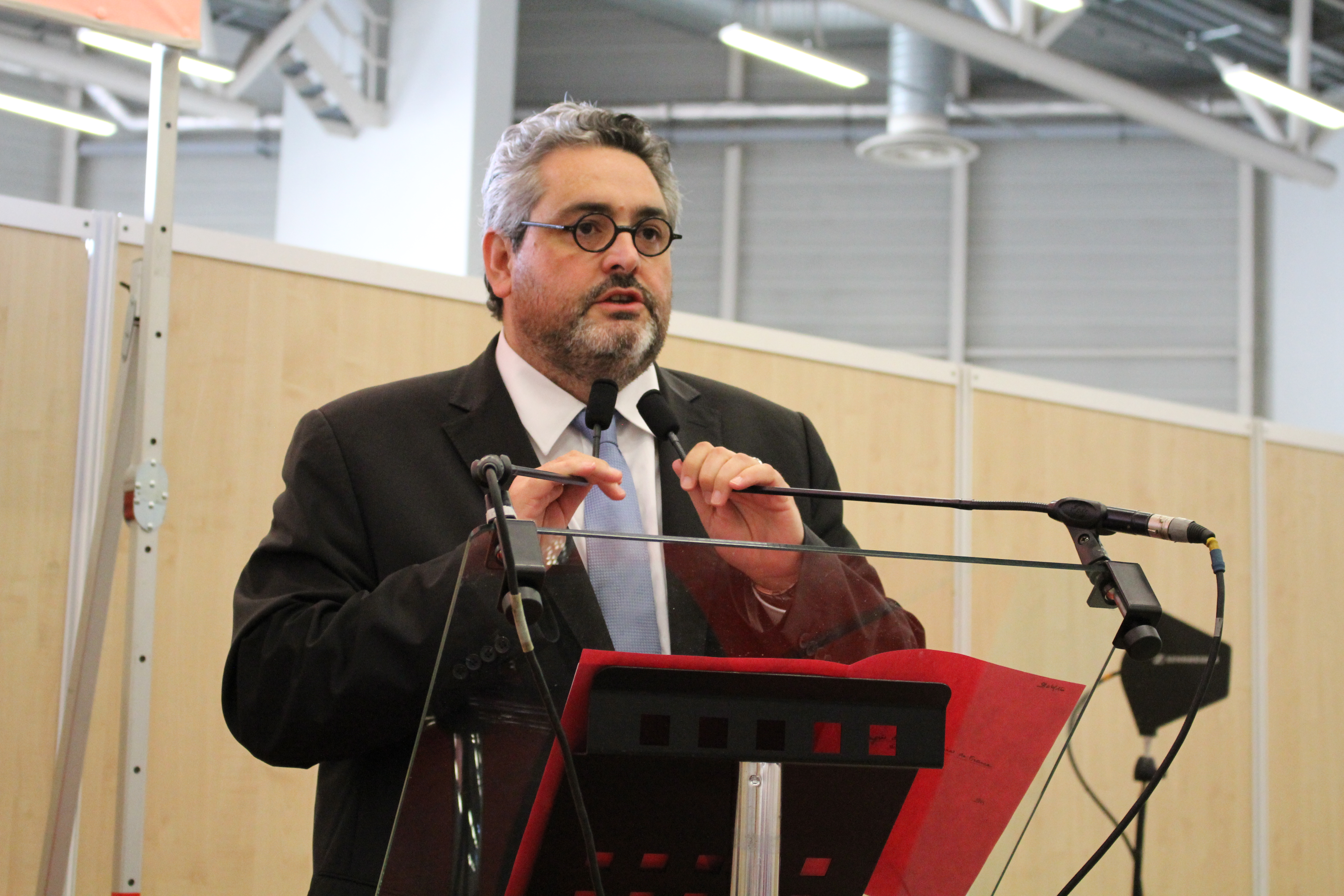
Current mayor Olivier Bianchi

This is a list of mayors of Clermont-Ferrand. It includes all mayors (maires) of Clermont-Ferrand, France, since 1694.

== Ancien Régime ==
- 1694-1719 : Jean-Antoine de Bonnet
- 1720-1723 : Antoine de Bonnet (his son)
- 1723-1724 : N... Bernard
- 1751 : Annet Barthomyvat des Paleines
- 1766-1769 : Jean-Baptiste Guerrier
- 1769-1772 : Annet Barthomyvat des Paleines
- 1777-1780 : Pierre Tixier
- 1780-1786 : Guillaume du Fraisse de Vernines
- 1786-1790 : Louis Anne Reboul
- 1790-1791 : Jean-François Gaultier de Biauzat
- 1791-1792 : Antoine Sablon

== Republic ==
- 1792-1794 : Michel Monestier
- 1794-1794 : Étienne Bonarme (3 months)
- 1794-1795 : Jean-François Gaultier de Biauzat
- 1795-1795 : Antoine Bergier (4 months)
- 1795-1797 : Michel Monestier
- 1797-1798 : Guillaume Grimardias
- 1798-1798 : Claude Alexis Mabru (5 months)
- 1798-1800 : Jacques Veysset
- 1800-1805 : Antoine Sablon
- 1805-1809 : Martial de Solagniat, juge
- 1809-1815 : François Grangier de Lamothe
- 1815-1818 : Jean-Baptiste André, baron d'Aubière
- 1818-1820 : Jean-Baptiste Joseph Tixier, baron
- 1820-1822 : Jean-Baptiste André, baron d'Aubière
- 1822-1830 : Antoine Blatin
- 1830-1835 : Jules Gilbert Antoine Cariol
- 1835-1843 : Hippolyte Conchon
- 1843-1848 : Lunius Verdier de Latour
- 1848-1848 : Antoine Jouvet (3 months)
- 1848-1848 : Jean-Joseph Vimal-Lalarrige (4 months)
- 1848-1850 : Jean-Baptiste Poncillon
- 1850-1860 : Pierre Léon Bérard de Chazelles
- 1860-1861 : Frédéric Claude François Bonnay
- 1862-1870 : Jacques Philippe Mège
- 1870-1871 : Agénor Bardoux (maternal grandfather of Valéry Giscard d'Estaing)
- 1871-1874 : Agis-Léon Ledru
- 1874-1875 : Félix Rougane de Chanteloup
- 1875-1880 : André Moinier
- 1880-1884 : Gilbert Gaillard
- 1884-1885 : Jean-Baptiste Antoine Blatin
- 1886-1888 : Émile Saint-Rame
- 1888-1893 : Louis Arnédée Ulysse Gasquet

== Elected mayors ==
The mayors of Clermont-Ferrand from 1893 to present.

Image	Mayor	Term start	Term end	Party
	Pierre Lecuellé	1893	1900	I
	Louis Renon	1900	1904	I
	Antoine Marie-Charles Fabre	1904	1912	I (Republican)
	Ernest Charles Vigenaud	1912	1919	PSR
	Philippe Marcombes	1919	1929	PSR
	Paul Gondard	1929	1935	PSR
	Philippe Marcombes	1935	1935	PSR
	Paul Pochet-Lagaye	1935	1944	PSR
	Gabriel Montpied	1944	1973	PSR
	Roger Quilliot	1973	1997	PS
	Serge Godard	1997	2014	PS
	Olivier Bianchi	2014	Incumbent	PS

== See also ==
- Timeline of Clermont-Ferrand
