= List of senators of Puy-de-Dôme =

Location of Puy-de-Dôme in France

Following is a list of senators of Puy-de-Dôme, people who have represented the department of Puy-de-Dôme in the Senate of France.

== Third Republic ==
Senators for Puy-de-Dôme under the French Third Republic were:

- Jacques Mège (1876–1878)
- Prosper-Claude de Barante (1876–1882)
- Mathieu Salneuve (1876–1889)
- Jean-Baptiste Guyot-Lavaline (1879–1900)
- Robert Goutay (1882–1889)
- François Girot-Pouzol (1885–1891)
- Gilbert Le Guay (1889–1891)
- Gilbert Gaillard (1889–1898)
- Charles Barrière (1891–1909)
- Hippolyte Gomot (1891–1927)
- Jean Chantagrel (1898–1907)
- Victor Bataille (1900–1908)
- Antoine Bony-Cisternes (1907–1927)
- Léon Chambige (1909–1914)
- Pierre-Jean Sabaterie (1909–1930)
- Étienne Clémentel (1920–1936)
- Louis Darteyre (1927–1932)
- Baptiste Marrou (1927–1936)
- Eugène Chassaing (1930–1940)
- Paul Malsang (1933–1937)
- Eugène Roy (1936–1938)
- Pierre Laval (1936–1940)
- François Albert-Buisson (1937–1940)
- Jacques Bardoux (1938–1940)

== Fourth Republic ==
Senators for Puy-de-Dôme under the French Fourth Republic were:

Period	Name	Group
1946	Francis Dassaud	(SCFIO)
1946	Edmond Pialoux	(MRP)
1948	Francis Dassaud	(SCFIO)
1948	Roger Fournier	(SFIO)
1948	Jean Reynouard	(RGR)
1952	Michel Champleboux	(SCFIO)
1952	Francis Dassaud	(SCFIO)
1952	Gabriel Montpied	(SCFIO)

== Fifth Republic ==
Senators for Puy-de-Dôme under the French Fifth Republic were:

Period	Name	Group	Notes
1959	Francis Dassaud	Socialist and Republican group (SFIO)	
1959	Gabriel Montpied	Socialist and Republican group (SFIO)	
1959	Michel Champleboux	Socialist and Republican group (SFIO)	
1965	Abel Gauthier	Socialist and Republican group (SFIO)	
1965	Gabriel Montpied	Socialist and Republican group (SFIO)	
1965	Michel Champleboux	Socialist and Republican group (SFIO)	Died 1967, replaced by André Barroux]
1965	André Barroux	Miscellaneous left (DVG)	Replaced Michel Champleboux in 1967
1974	Roger Quilliot	Socialist Party (France) (PS)	Named to cabinet 1981, resigned, replaced by Michel Charasse
1974	Michel Charasse	Socialist Party (France) (PS)	Replaced Roger Quilliot in 1981
1974	Gilbert Belin	Socialist Party (France) (PS)	
1974	André Barroux	Socialist Party (France) (PS)	
25 septembre 1983	Michel Charasse	Socialist Party (France) (PS)	Named to government in 1988, replaced by Gilbert Belin
25 septembre 1983	Gilbert Belin	Socialist Party (France) (PS)	Replaced Michel Charasse in 1988
25 septembre 1983	Marcel Bony	Socialist Party (France) (PS)	
25 septembre 1983	Roger Quilliot	Socialist Party (France) (PS))	Elected deputy and resigned 1986, reelected to senate in 1986
27 septembre 1992	Michel Charasse	Socialist Party (France) (PS)	
27 septembre 1992	Marcel Bony	Socialist Party (France) (PS)	
27 septembre 1992	Roger Quilliot	Socialist Party (France) (PS)	Resigned in 1998, replaced by Serge Godard in by-election
27 septembre 1992	Serge Godard	Socialist Party (France) (PS)	Replaced Roger Quilliot in by-election 1998
23 septembre 2001	Michèle André	Socialist and Republican group (SOC)	
23 septembre 2001	Michel Charasse	Socialist and Republican group (SOC), then European Democratic and Social Rally group (RDSE)	Named to Constitutional Council in 2010 replaced by Serge Godard
23 septembre 2001	Serge Godard	Socialist Party (France) (PS)	Replaced Michel Charasse in 2010
23 septembre 2001	Jean-Marc Juilhard	Independent Republicans (RI) – The Republicans group (UMP)	
25 septembre 2011	Michèle André	Socialist Party (France) (PS)	
25 septembre 2011	Jacques-Bernard Magner	Socialist Party (France) (PS)	
25 septembre 2011	Alain Néri	Socialist Party (France) (PS)	
24 septembre 2017	Jean-Marc Boyer	The Republicans (LR)	
24 septembre 2017	Éric Gold	La République En Marche! (REM)	
24 septembre 2017	Jacques-Bernard Magner	Socialist Party (France) (PS)	

== Sources ==
- Liste des anciens sénateurs de la IIIème République par circonscription (in French), Sénat de France
- Liste des anciens sénateurs de la IVème République par circonscription (in French), Sénat de France
- Liste des anciens sénateurs de la Vème République par circonscription (in French), Sénat de France
- Liste par département - Puy-de-Dôme (in French), Sénat de France
