= Ledru =

Ledru may refer to:

== People with the surname ==
- Agis-Léon Ledru (1816-1885), French architect and politician.
- Louis-Charles-François Ledru (1778-1861), French architect.
- Louis-Antoine-Marie Ledru Gaultier de Biauzat (1845-1886), French architect.
- Marie-Louise Ledru, French marathon runner.
- Nicolas-Philippe Ledru (1731–1807), French magician.

=== People with the double-barrelled surname Ledru-Rollin ===
- Alexandre Auguste Ledru-Rollin (1807-1874), French politician.

== Locations ==
- Ledru-Rollin station, a Paris Metro station in Paris, France.
