= Palmade =

Palmade is a surname. Notable people with the surname include:

- Maurice Palmade (1886–1955), French politician
- Pierre Palmade (born 1968), French actor, comedian, stage director and playwright
