= Le Mont-Dore =

Le Mont-Dore can refer to:

- Mont-Dore, a commune in the Puy-de-Dôme department in Auvergne in central France. Formerly called Mont-Dore-les-Bains.
- Le Mont-Dore, New Caledonia, a commune in the suburbs of Nouméa in the South Province of New Caledonia.
