= Christian Sautter =

French politician

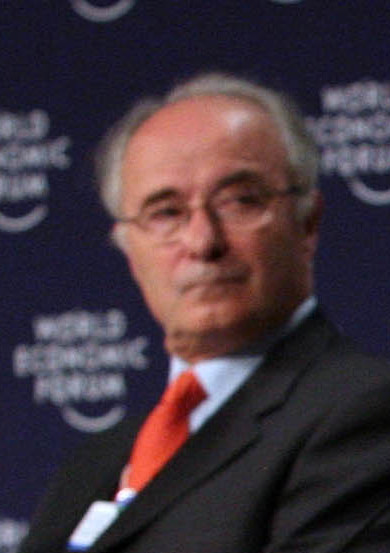
- Christian Sautter at the World Economic Forum in 2008

Minister of the Economy, Finances and Industry
- In office 2 November 1999 – 27 March 2000
- President: Jacques Chirac
- Prime Minister: Lionel Jospin
- Preceded by: Dominique Strauss-Kahn
- Succeeded by: Laurent Fabius

Secretary of State for Budget
- In office 4 June 1997 – 2 November 1999
- President: Jacques Chirac
- Prime Minister: Lionel Jospin
- Preceded by: Alain Lamassoure
- Succeeded by: Florence Parly

Personal details
- Born: 9 April 1940 (age 86) Autun, France
- Party: Socialist Party
- Education: Lycée Pasteur
- Alma mater: École Polytechnique

Christian Sautter (born 9 April 1940) is a French politician. He served as Minister for Economics, Finance, and Industry from 1999 to 2000 as part of Lionel Jospin's "Plural Left" government.

In 2014 Sautter was awarded with the Order of the Rising Sun, Gold and Silver Star.

Political offices
Preceded by Dominique Strauss-Kahn	Minister for Economics, Finance, and Industry of France; 1999–2000	Succeeded by Laurent Fabius
