= Jean-François Gaultier de Biauzat =

French politician

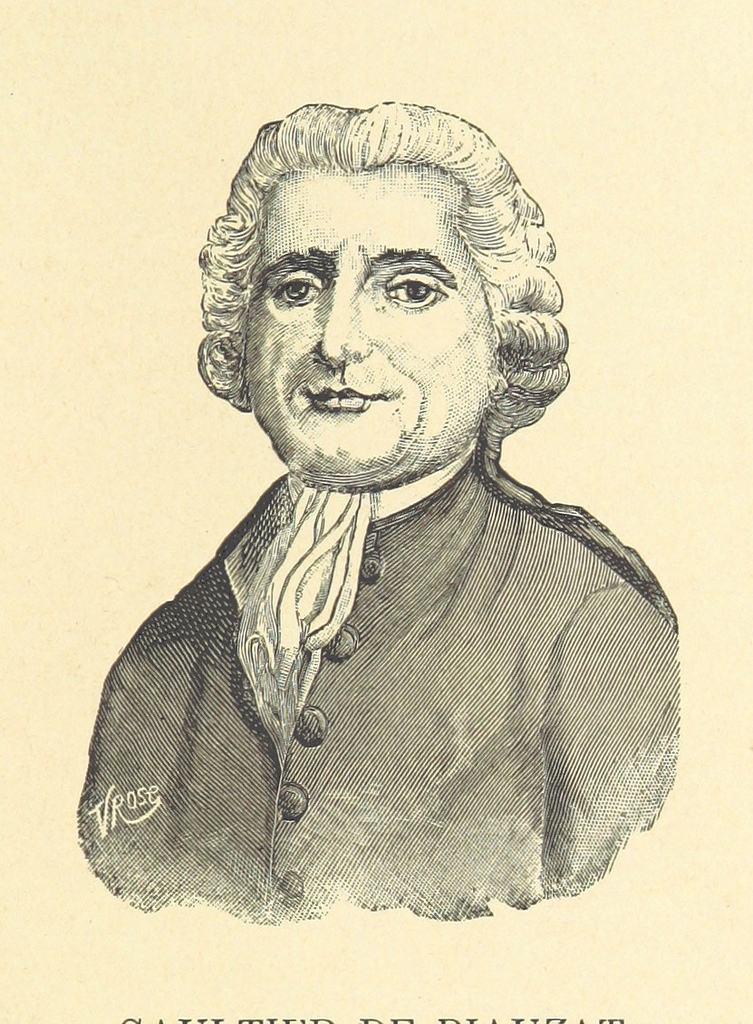
- Born: 23 October 1739; Vodable, Puy-de-Dôme, France
- Died: 22 February 1815 (aged 75); Paris, France
- Occupation: Politician
- Spouse: Claudine Antoinette Vimal
- Relatives: Agis-Léon Ledru (great-grandson)

Jean-François Gaultier de Biauzat (1739-1815) was a French politician. He served as a member of the National Constituent Assembly from 1789 to 1791, and as the mayor of Clermont-Ferrand from 1790 to 1791.
