= Louis-Antoine-Marie Ledru Gaultier de Biauzat =

French architect (1845–1886)

- Born: 1845
- Died: 1886 (aged 40–41)
- Occupation: Architect
- Parent: Agis-Léon Ledru
- Relatives: Louis-Charles-François Ledru (paternal grandfather)

Louis-Antoine-Marie Ledru Gaultier de Biauzat (1845–1886) was a French architect. He designed the market and schools in Clermont-Ferrand as well as the casino in Le Mont-Dore. He competed to design the spa in Le Mont-Dore, but Émile Camut's designs were chosen instead.
