= Alain Lamassoure =

French politician (born 1944)

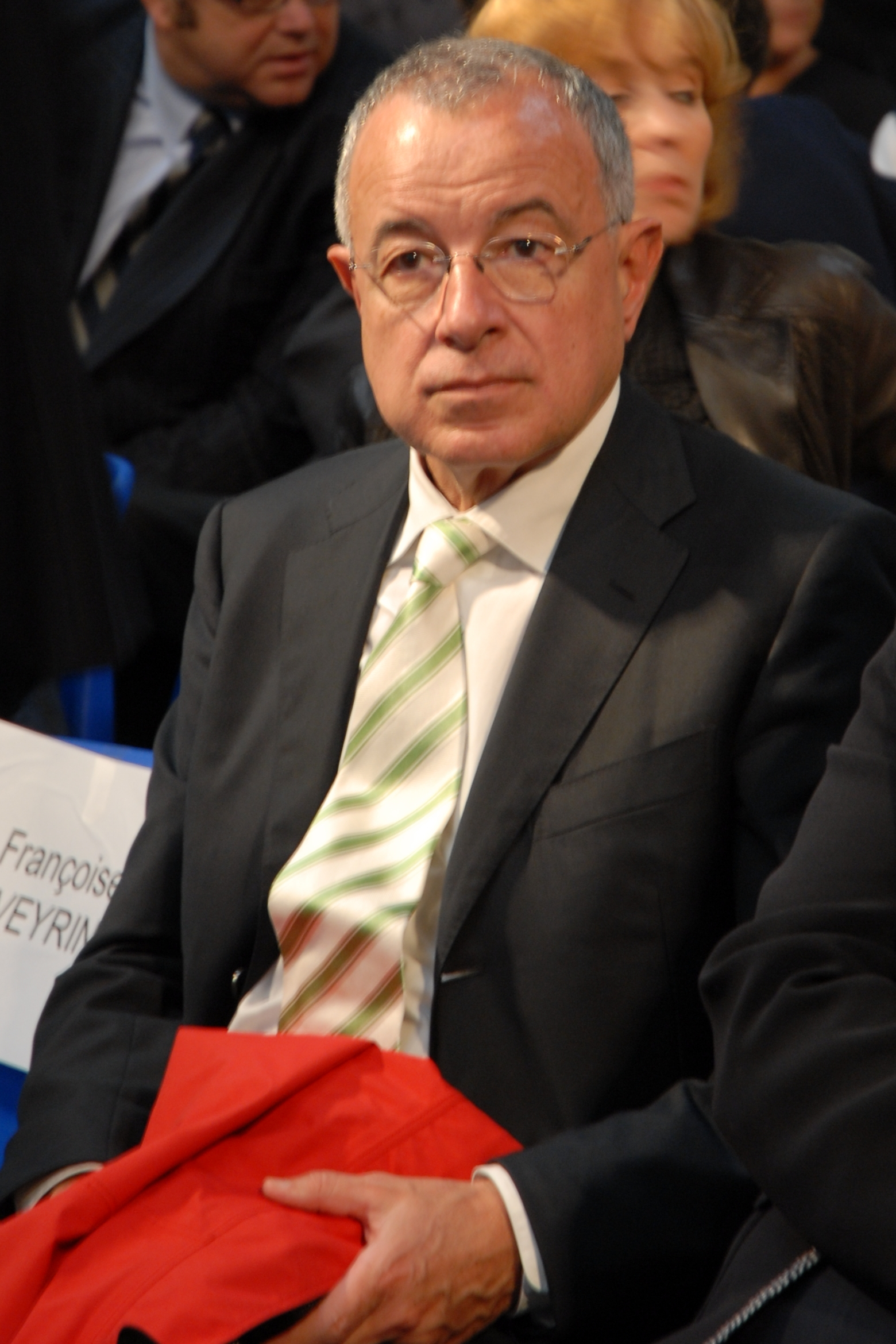
- Alain Lamassoure in 2007

Minister delegate to the Budget
- In office 7 November 1995 – 2 June 1997
- Prime Minister: Alain Juppé
- Preceded by: François d'Aubert
- Succeeded by: Christian Sautter

Minister delegate to European affairs
- In office 30 March 1993 – 11 May 1995
- Prime Minister: Édouard Balladur
- Preceded by: Georges Kiejman
- Succeeded by: Michel Barnier

Personal details
- Born: 10 February 1944 (age 82) Pau, France
- Party: The Republicans; UMP; UDF
- Education: Sciences Po, ÉNA

Alain Lamassoure (French pronunciation: [alɛ̃ lamasuʁ]; born 10 February 1944) is a French politician and Member of the European Parliament for the south-west of France. He was a member of Les Républicains, which is part of the European People's Party, and was the chairman of the European Parliament's Committee on Budgets from July 2009 until June 2014.

He is a substitute for the Committee on Constitutional Affairs, a member of the delegation for relations with the countries of South Asia and the South Asian Association for Regional Cooperation, and a member of the EPP-ED bureau. He was also a member of the temporary committee on policy challenges and budgetary means of the enlarged Union 2007–2013. Lamassoure is a member of the Reconciliation of European Histories Group.

He was in charge of writing parts of the Treaty of Lisbon. Alain Lamassoure is a well-known pro-European. He is a member of the European Movement France, which he has been vice-president of, and has a privileged relationship with the diverse European federalist groups.

== Career ==
- Graduate of the Paris Institute of Political Studies (1964) and ENA (National School of Administration) (1968)
- Auditor, Commissioner of Audit, then Senior Member of the Court of Auditors (1968–1973, 1976–1977, 1981–1986, 1997–1999)
- Special adviser in the office of the Minister for Cultural Affairs (1973–1974)
- Technical adviser in the offices of the Minister for Finance (1974–1976), the Minister for Infrastructure (1977–1978) and the President of the Republic (1978–1981)
- Economic and social adviser (1985–1986)
- Delegate, 'Perspectives et Réalités' clubs (1985–1989)
- UDF spokesman (1988)
- Vice-president of the UDF (1999–2002)
- National Secretary of the UMP (since July 2003)
- First Deputy Mayor of Anglet (1995–1999)
- Mayor of Anglet (1999–2000)
- Member of the Anglet Municipal Council (since 2000)
- Chairman of the Bayonne-Anglet-Biarritz Urban Area Community Council (1995–2001)
- Vice-chairman of the Bayonne-Anglet-Biarritz Urban Area Community Council (since 2001)
- Chairman of the Council of Elected Representatives of the Basque Country
- Member of the National Assembly (1986–1993)
- Minister with special responsibility for European Affairs (1993–1995)
- Minister with special responsibility for the budget and government spokesman (1995–1997)
- Member of the European Parliament (1989–1993 and since 1999)
- Chairman of the Committee on Budgetary Control (1992–1993)
- Representative of the European Parliament at the European Convention (2002–2003)
- Vice-president of the European Movement – France (since 1999)
- Chairman of the Committee on Budgets (2009–2014)
- Knight of the Legion of Honour
