= Olivier Dutheillet de Lamothe =

French politician

Member of the Constitutional Council
- In office 12 March 2001 – 12 March 2010
- President: Jacques Chirac; Nicolas Sarkozy
- Preceded by: Georges Abadie
- Succeeded by: Michel Charasse

Personal details
- Born: 10 November 1949 (age 76) Neuilly-sur-Seine, France
- Education: Lycée Pasteur
- Alma mater: Sciences Po, ÉNA

Olivier Dutheillet de Lamothe (born 10 November 1949) was a member of the Constitutional Council of France from 2001 to 2010.
