= Saint-Mary de Colamine Church =

Church in Vodable, France

- Église Saint-Mary de Colamine
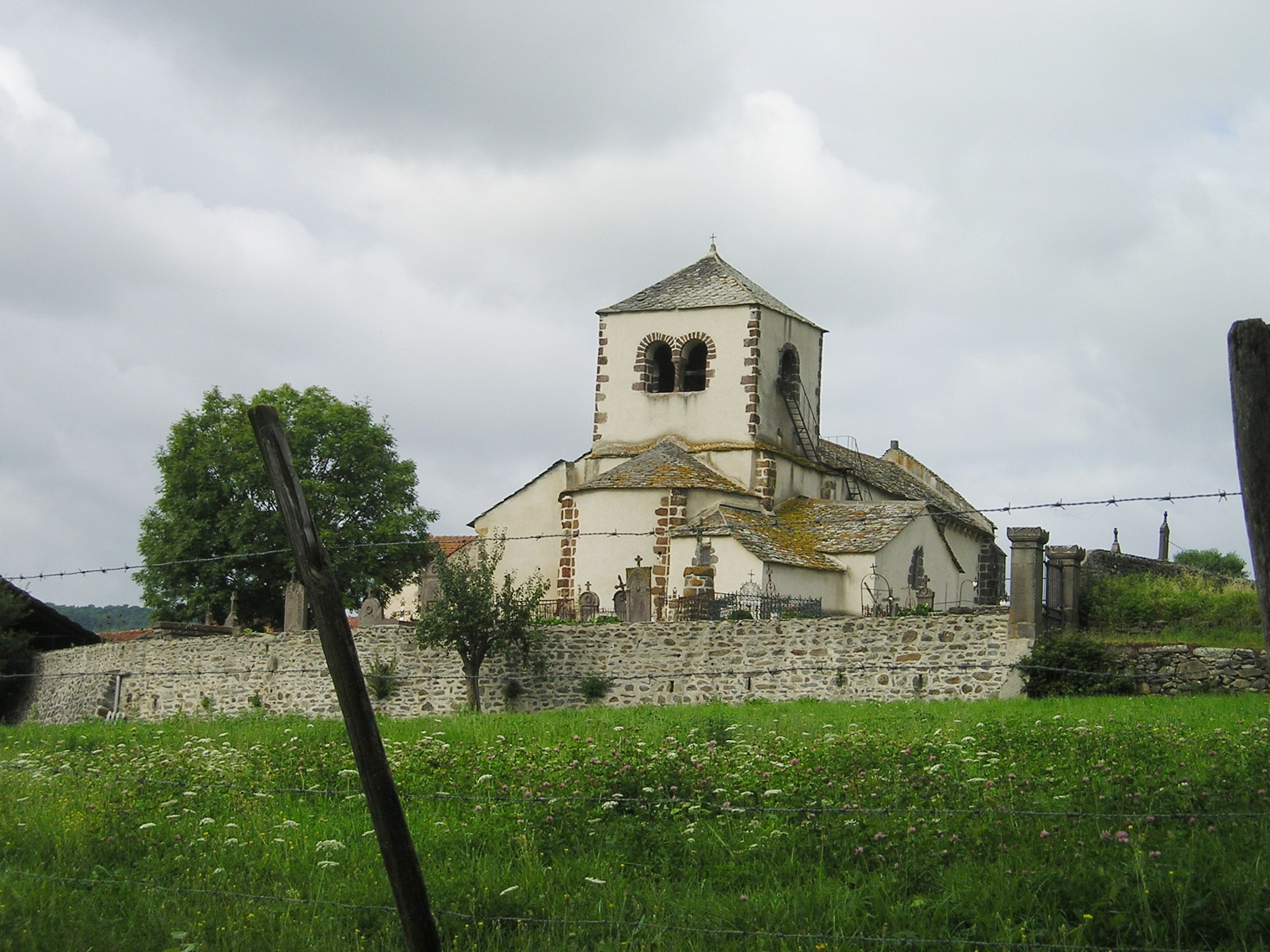

Religion
- Region: Auvergne-Rhône-Alpes

Location
- Municipality: Vodable
- Country: France
- Interactive map of Saint-Mary de Colamine Church

Architecture
- Style: Roman architecture

Saint-Mary de Colamine Church is a building in the French town of Vodable, in Puy-de-Dôme.

== History ==
Located in Sub-Colamine Vodable, Saint-Mary de Colmaine is a small Romanesque church of the 6th century.

The building consists of a nave accompanied by an incomplete south aisle; a transept; a steeple rising above the crossing of the transept; an apse with cut sides whose roof follows the shape of a hemicycle; and a north-facing chapel. The frameless roof is covered with slate. The interior of the transept is covered with a dome resting on small arcades in the trunk, resting on shelves edge decorated with tablets. These tablets are medallions decorated with geometric decorations, foliage, or human heads. The double-aux fall on the capitals carved in the foliage of the columns arranged at the angles.

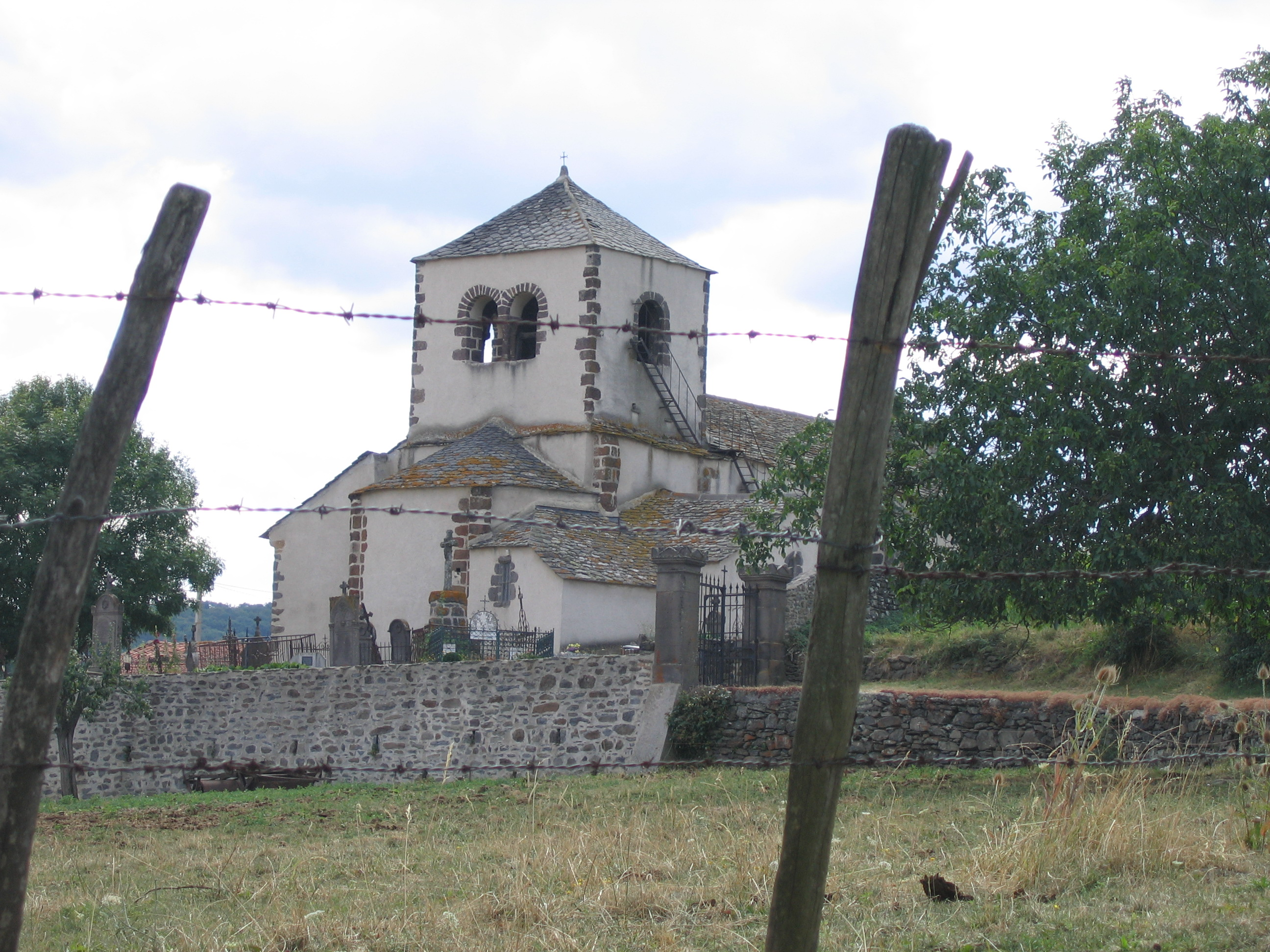
The church.

== Interior ==
The church contains five statues classified as historical monuments, four of which are medieval.
