= Martin Malvy =

French politician (born 1936)

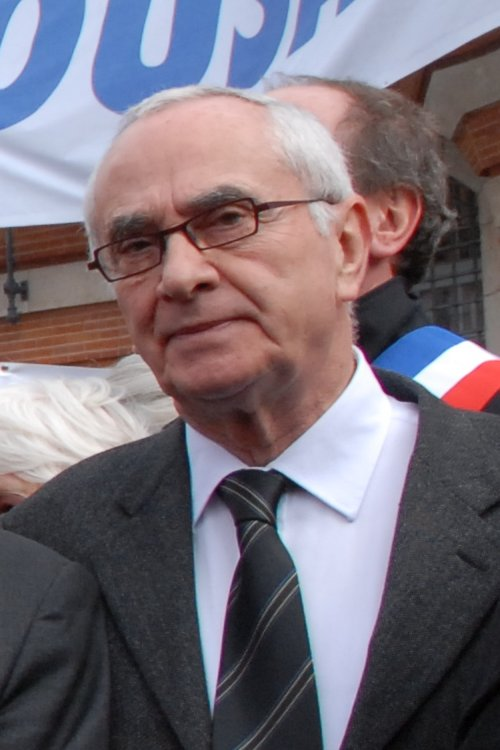
- Martin Malvy in 2007

President of the Regional Council of Midi-Pyrénées
- In office 6 April 1998 – 31 December 2015
- Preceded by: Marc Censi
- Succeeded by: Carole Delga

Minister of Budget
- In office 2 October 1992 – 29 March 1993
- President: François Mitterrand
- Prime Minister: Pierre Bérégovoy
- Preceded by: Michel Charasse
- Succeeded by: Nicolas Sarkozy

Personal details
- Born: 24 February 1936 (age 90) Paris, France
- Party: Socialist Party
- Education: University of Toulouse

Martin Malvy (born 24 February 1936) is a French politician of the Socialist Party.

In 1992, Malvy was the spokesman of the French government. Between 1992 and 1993, he served as Minister of Budget. He later served as president of the Région Midi-Pyrénées between 1998 and 2015.

In the Socialist Party's 2011 primaries, Malvy endorsed Martine Aubry as the party's candidate for the 2012 presidential election.
