= Gilbert Belin =

French politician (1927–2020)

Gilles Belin

General Councillor of the Canton of Jumeaux
- In office 1970–2001

Mayor of Brassac-les-Mines
- In office 1971–2001
- Preceded by: Justin Laroussinie
- Succeeded by: Maurice Barreyre

Senator of Puy-de-Dôme
- In office 22 September 1974 – 2 October 1983
- Preceded by: Michel Charasse
- Succeeded by: Michel Charasse

Senator of Puy-de-Dôme
- In office 29 July 1988 – 1 October 1992
- Preceded by: Michel Charasse
- Succeeded by: Michel Charasse

Personal details
- Born: 22 October 1927 Clermont-Ferrand, France
- Died: 14 February 2020 (aged 92)
- Party: PS

Gilbert Belin (22 October 1927 – 14 February 2020) was a French politician and sculptor.

== Biography ==
Belin enrolled in the École supérieure d'art de Clermont Métropole in 1940, at the time when it was headed by Louis Dussour, and its faculty included Valentin Vigneron and Alfred Thesonnier. He joined the French Ministry of National Education in 1949 and became a professor of plastic art in Brassac-les-Mines and Saint-Éloy-les-Mines. After Gustave Gournier's departure from the École supérieure d'art de Clermont Métropole, Belin gave lectures there in the 1980s.

Belin was a member of the Société des Artistes d'Auvergne while leading art workshops and participating in local exhibitions with the organization.

Belin began his political career in the 1970s, with his election into the Canton of Jumeaux. He would be re-elected in every attempt until his retirement from politics in 2001. He also served five terms as mayor of Brassac-les-Mines from 1971 to 2001. He served as a Senator for Puy-de-Dôme from 1974 until 1983, when he chose not to run for re-election as Michel Charasse took over. However, Belin returned to Luxembourg Palace in 1988 and was nominated as Minister of State, and appointed to the Ministry of the Economy and Finance in the government of Michel Rocard. He remained in the Senate until 1992, and stayed in power in Puy-de-Dôme and Brassac-les-Mines until 2001.

Belin died on 14 February 2020 at the age of 92.

== Honors ==
- Officer of the Legion of Honour (1993), Knight in 1984

== Publications ==
- Brassac & ses environs (1992)
