= Pierre Bérégovoy =

Prime Minister of France from 1992 to 1993

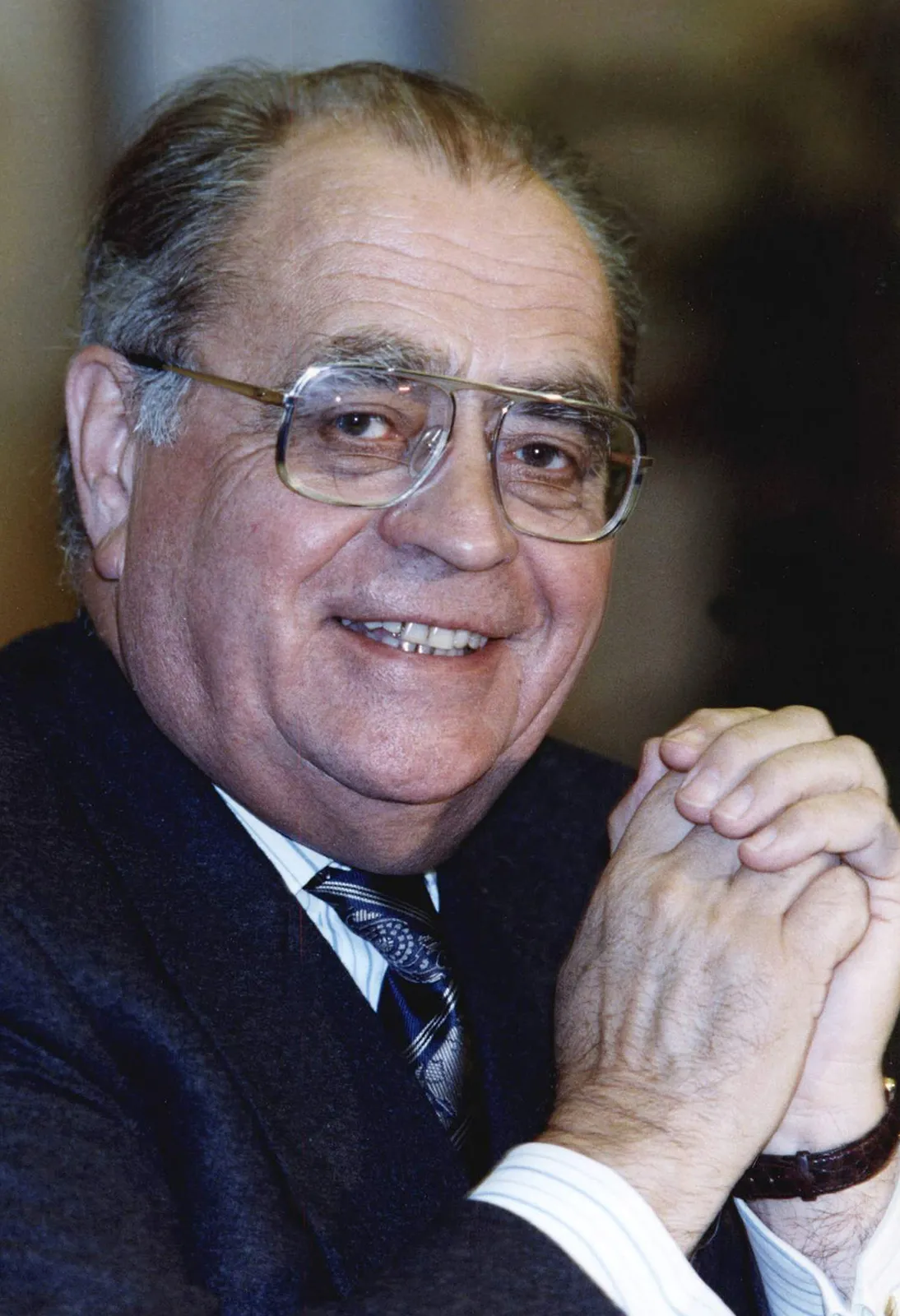
- Pierre Bérégovoy in the 1980s

Prime Minister of France
- In office 2 April 1992 – 29 March 1993
- President: François Mitterrand
- Preceded by: Édith Cresson
- Succeeded by: Édouard Balladur

Minister of State Minister of Economics, Finance and Budget
- In office 13 May 1988 – 2 April 1992
- Preceded by: Édouard Balladur (Economy and Finances); Alain Juppé (Budget)
- Succeeded by: Michel Sapin (Economy and Finances); Michel Charasse (Budget)

Personal details
- Born: Pierre Eugène Bérégovoy; 23 December 1925 Déville-lès-Rouen, France
- Died: 1 May 1993 (aged 67) Nevers, France
- Party: SFIO (until 1959); PSU (1960–69); PS (1969–93)
- Occupation: Metallurgist, politician

Pierre Eugène Bérégovoy (French: [pjɛʁ øʒɛn beʁeɡɔvwa]; 23 December 1925 – 1 May 1993) was a French politician who served as Prime Minister of France under President François Mitterrand from 2 April 1992 to 29 March 1993. He was a member of the Socialist Party and Member of Parliament for Nièvre's 1st constituency.

== Early career ==
Pierre Bérégovoy was born in Déville-lès-Rouen to a French mother and a Ukrainian father (original family name Береговий in Ukrainian or Береговой in Russian) who had left the Russian Empire after the Russian Civil War.

He started his professional life at the age of 16 as a qualified metal worker. He got involved in politics following his activities in the French Resistance – while working at SNCF during World War II. A member of the socialist SFIO and of the trade unions confederation Workers Force, he joined the staff of the Minister of Public Works and Transport, Christian Pineau, as adviser for relations with the trade unions in 1949. One year later, he became a technical agent at Gaz de France.

In 1959, he left the SFIO and participated in the foundation of the dissident Unified Socialist Party (PSU). He became an adviser of Pierre Mendès-France. In 1967, with Alain Savary, he created the pro-Mendès-France Union of Clubs for the Renewal of the Left. This group joined the renewed Socialist Party (PS) in 1969. He joined the executive group of the party behind François Mitterrand, and participated notably in the negotiations of the Common Program of the Union of the Left.

In 1981, following Mitterrand's election as President of France, he was chosen as Secretary General of the Presidency. One year later, he joined the cabinet as Minister of Social affairs. He was among the Socialist politicians who advised President Mitterrand to leave the European Monetary System in order to continue Socialist economic policy. But in March 1983, Mitterrand listened to his Prime Minister Pierre Mauroy and ratified the change of economic policy.

The 1985 "Plaza Accord" is named after New York City's Plaza Hotel, which was the location of a meeting of finance ministers who reached an agreement about managing the fluctuating value of the US dollar. From left are Gerhard Stoltenberg of West Germany, Pierre Bérégovoy of France, James A. Baker III of the United States, Nigel Lawson of Britain and Noboru Takeshita of Japan.

Bérégovoy became Minister of the Economy and Finance, from 1984 to the 1986 Socialist electoral defeat.

Elected mayor of Nevers in 1983, and deputy of Nièvre département in 1986, in the electoral land of Mitterrand, he was manager of the latter's 1988 presidential campaign. After his re-election, at the time of each cabinet reshuffle, his name was mentioned as a possible prime minister. In the end, he returned to the Ministry of the Economy and Finance. In this function, he symbolized the adaptation of French socialism to the market economy and struck up hearty relations with employer representatives.

After the 1992 regional elections, which were a disaster for the PS, he was finally appointed Prime Minister and formed a new minority government. He promised to fight unemployment, economic decline and corruption. During his inaugural speech in the French National Assembly, he claimed he knew the names of politicians from the right-wing opposition implicated in corruption scandals, causing a great hue and cry. Bérégovoy forced Bernard Tapie, his Minister of Urban Affairs, to resign in May 1992 after his indictment by the French justice. He thus created the misnamed "Balladur jurisprudence". In social policy, a number of reforms were carried out. In November 1992 a law was passed that inserted a (arguably narrow) definition of sexual harassment into the labour code and empowered the labour inspectorate and workplace committees to enforce it. In May 1992, increased aid was provided to farmers, mainly comprising reductions in the agricultural land tax and increased grants for young farmers. In June 1992, the French parliament passed a bill which required mayors to encourage social mixing in public housing. A law of 12 July 1992 was aimed at enhancing both the status of child-minders and "the quality of day care for children in a family environment," and a law of 29 July 1992 improved entitlement to medical assistance. The Sapin law of January 1993 sought to prevent corruption and encourage transparency "in economic activities and public procedures," and a law of January 1993 established "the principle of joint parental authority in the legitimate family, even if a divorce occurs." In addition, the coverage of housing benefits was extended, and minimum requirements for social plans were introduced.

After nearly a year as Prime Minister, Bérégovoy led the Socialist Party into the electoral collapse of the March 1993 parliamentary elections: the governing party, which previously held 260 seats (29 short from an overall majority), was reduced to only 53 seats, thus constituting the worst electoral defeat in the French left's history and one of the worst ever suffered by a governing party in French history. He resigned as PM on 29 March 1993.

== Political career ==
Secretary General of the Presidency of the Republic: 1981–1982.

Governmental functions

Prime Minister: 1992–1993.

Minister of Economy and Finances: 1984–1986 / 1988–1992.

Minister of Social Affairs: 1982–1984.

Electoral mandates

National Assembly of France

Member of the National Assembly of France for Nièvre: 1986–1988 (Became minister in 1988) / March–May 1993 (Died in May 1993). Elected in 1986, reelected in 1988, 1993.

General Council

General Councillor of the Nièvre: 1985–1993 (Died in May 1993). Reelected in 1992.

Municipal Council

Mayor of Nevers: 1983–1993 (Died in May 1993). Reelected in 1989.

Municipal councillor of Nevers: 1983–1993 (Died in May 1993). Reelected in 1989.

== Death ==
Bérégovoy killed himself with a gunshot on 1 May 1993. Friends said he had been depressed ever since he lost the March legislative election in which his Socialist Party won only 67 out of 577 parliamentary seats. Bérégovoy was also being investigated concerning a one-million-franc interest-free loan he received from businessman and close friend, Roger-Patrice Pelat. Pelat had died of a heart attack on 7 March 1989, shortly after being found guilty in the Péchiney-Triangle affair.

At Bérégovoy's funeral, held at Nevers in an atmosphere of tension and shock, François Mitterrand stated that media pressure in connection with the Pelat scandal was responsible for Bérégovoy's suicide. Targeting the press, he said Bérégovoy's "honour was thrown to the dogs", crediting him with "the grandeur of someone who chooses his destiny."

== Bérégovoy's ministry, 2 April 1992 – 29 March 1993 ==
- Pierre Bérégovoy – Prime Minister
- Roland Dumas – Minister of Foreign Affairs
- Pierre Joxe – Minister of Defense
- Paul Quilès – Minister of the Interior and Public Security
- Michel Sapin – Minister of Economy, Finance, and Privatization
- Michel Charasse – Minister of Budget
- Dominique Strauss-Kahn – Minister of Industry and External Commerce
- Martine Aubry – Minister of Labour, Employment, and Vocational Training
- Michel Vauzelle – Minister of Justice
- Jack Lang – Minister of National Education and Culture
- Louis Mermaz – Minister of Agriculture and Forests
- Ségolène Royal – Minister of Environment
- Frédérique Bredin – Minister of Youth and Sports
- Louis Le Pensec – Minister of Overseas Departments and Territories
- Jean-Louis Bianco – Minister of Transport, Housing, and Equipment
- Louis Mermaz – Minister of Relations with Parliament
- Bernard Kouchner – Minister of Health and Humanitarian Action
- Émile Zuccarelli – Minister of Posts and Telecommunications
- Michel Delebarre – Minister of Civil Service and Administrative Reform
- François Loncle – Minister of City, Minister of Planning
- Bernard Tapie – Minister of City
- Hubert Curien – Minister of Research and Space
- René Teulade – Minister of Social Affairs and Integration

Changes

- 23 May 1992 – Bernard Tapie leaves the ministry and the office of Minister of City is abolished
- 2 October 1992 – Martin Malvy succeeds Charasse as Minister of Budget. Jean-Pierre Soisson succeeds Mermaz as Minister of Agriculture, becoming also Minister of Rural Development
- 26 December 1992 – The office of Minister of City is re-established, with Bernard Tapie again as Minister
- 9 March 1993 – Pierre Joxe leaves the ministry of Defence and was succeeded by Pierre Bérégovoy (who remains also Prime minister)

Political offices
| Preceded by Jacques Wahl | Secretary General to the President; 1981–1982 | Succeeded by Jean-Louis Bianco |
| Preceded by Nicole Questiaux | Minister of Social Affairs; 1982–1984 | Succeeded by Georgina Dufoix |
| Preceded by Jacques Delors | Minister of Economy and Finance; 1984–1986 | Succeeded by Édouard Balladur |
| Preceded by Jacques Delors | Minister of Budget; 1984–1986 | Succeeded by Alain Juppé |
| Preceded by Édouard Balladur | Minister of Economy and Finance; 1988–1992 | Succeeded by Michel Sapin |
| Preceded by Alain Juppé | Minister of Budget; 1988–1992 | Succeeded by Michel Charasse |
| Preceded by Édith Cresson | Prime Minister of France; 1992–1993 | Succeeded by Édouard Balladur |
| Preceded by Pierre Joxe | Minister of Defence; 1993 | Succeeded by François Léotard |
