= Olivier Bianchi =

French politician (born 1970)

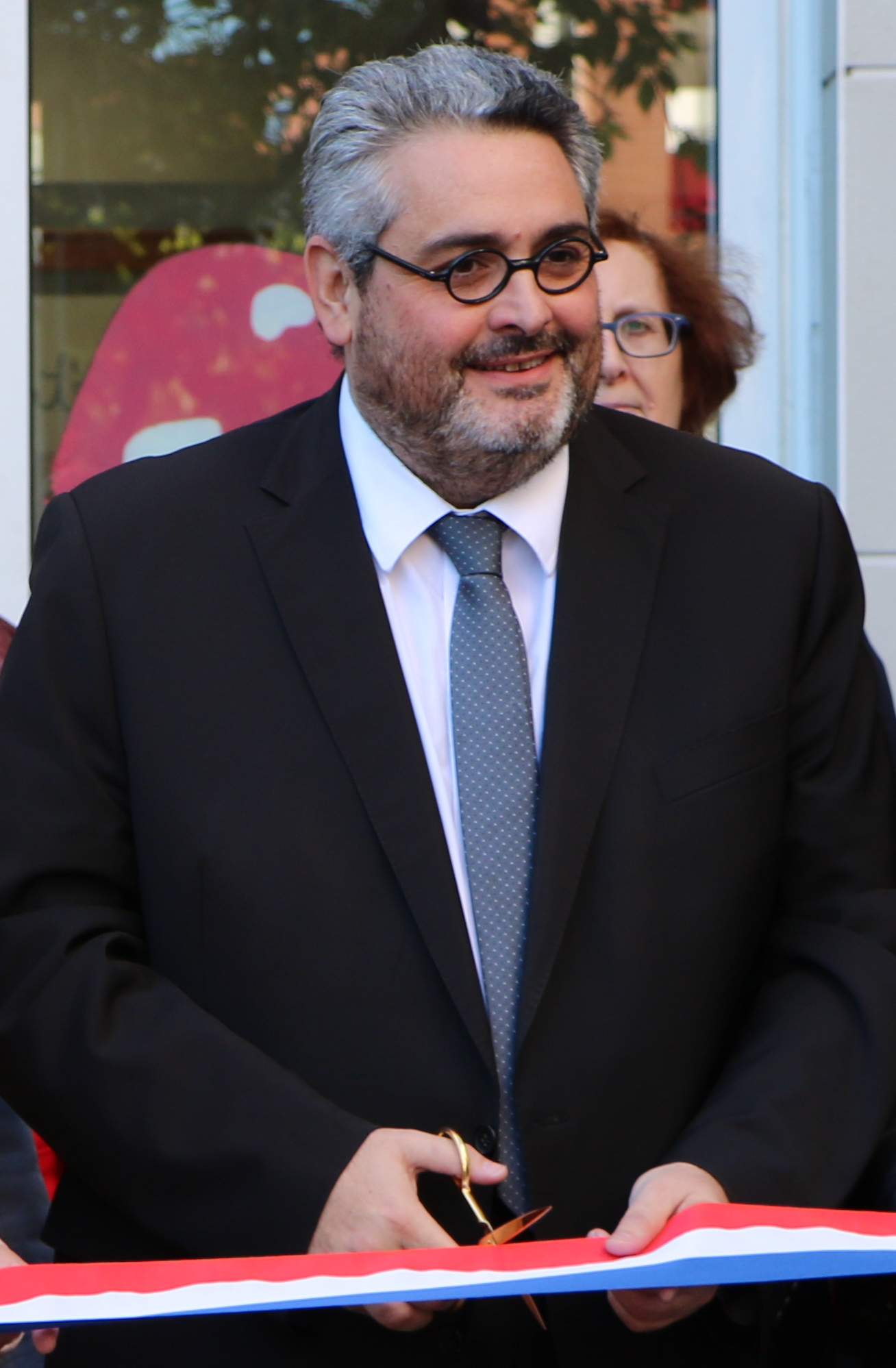
- Olivier Bianchi in 2017

Mayor of Clermont-Ferrand
- Incumbent
- Assumed office April 4, 2014

President of Clermont Auvergne Métropole
- Incumbent
- Assumed office April 22, 2014

Personal details
- Born: June 10, 1970 (age 56) 11th arrondissement of Paris, France
- Party: Socialist Party
- Education: University of Auvergne

Olivier Bianchi (French pronunciation: [ɔlivje bjɑ̃ki]; born June 10, 1970, in Paris) is a French politician. A member of the Socialist Party, he has been mayor of Clermont-Ferrand since April 4, 2014 and president of Clermont Auvergne Métropole since April 22, 2014.

== Biography ==
=== Childhood and education ===
Bianchi was born on June 10, 1970, in the 11th arrondissement of Paris to a father who was an SNCF agent and a mother who was a childcare worker. He moved around frequently because of his father's profession and lived in different cities (Mende, Marvejols, Sens, Langeac, Le Puy, Aurillac...) before settling in Clermont-Ferrand in 1988 for his law studies. He obtained a master's degree in public law and a degree in political science. He taught as a lecturer at the University of Auvergne for ten years.

== Political career ==
In 1989, he was president of the Auvergne Club Forum (a club gathering young people close to Michel Rocard, Prime Minister at the time).

He participated in the demonstrations against the Contract of Professional Integration; he was then the president of the General Assembly of the students of Clermont-UNEF-ID between 1993 and 1994 in Clermont-Ferrand. Between 1995 and 2001, he was a city councilor in Clermont-Ferrand. In 2008, he was elected vice-president of Clermont Communauté and took part in the cultural development of the Clermont agglomeration.

He was president of the Culture Commission of the AdCF (Assembly of French Communities) which he represented at the Council of Local Authorities for Cultural Development (CCTDC) with the Minister of Culture.

In March 2008, he was 23rd on the list of Serge Godard, Socialist Party candidate for the mayor of Clermont-Ferrand. After the victory of the latter, he became deputy mayor in charge of cultural policy.

To prepare the 2014 municipal election, a primary is organized within the Socialist Party, won by Bianchi. In March 2014, he led the left-wing list in the municipal election; it obtained 31% of the votes cast in the first round, which forced him to merge with the Left Front list (11.5%) to win the second round. The merged list won the election with 47.82%, in a three-way tie against the UMP and FN lists. Bianchi was elected mayor on April 4, succeeding Serge Godard.

He was elected president of Clermont Communauté, the urban community of Clermont-Ferrand, on April 22, 2014. He has also been treasurer of the National Federation of Urban Planning Agencies (FNAU) since 2014.

He is co-president of the Culture Commission of the Association of Mayors of Large Cities of France (AMGVF) from 2014 to 2015 and since 2015 of the Culture Commission of France. In this capacity, he sits on the Council of Local Authorities for Cultural Development (CCTDC), a body for dialogue and consultation between the Ministry of Culture and Communication and local authorities. In 2015, he launched the États généraux de la culture (General States of Culture) to reframe the cultural development plan with the aim of enabling Clermont-Ferrand to become the European Capital of Culture in 2028.

On December 17, 2015, he announced an increase in the municipal share in local and property taxes of 9% for 2016, promising not to increase taxes for the rest of his term.

On November 26, 2019, Bianchi officially launched the campaign of the list of union of the left that he leads for the municipal elections of March 15 and June 28, 2020. He brought together many parties and movements of the left including the Socialist Party, Europe Ecologie Les Verts, Génération.s, and the Communist Party.

On June 28, 2020, following the second round of municipal elections, Olivier Bianchi was re-elected with 48.41% of the vote against Jean-Pierre Brenas (LR, 36.50%) and Marianne Maximi (FI, 15.08%).

== Timeline ==
- 1993-1994: President of the General Assembly of Clermont-Ferrand students AGEC-UNEF-ID
- 1995 : Councillor in charge of youth at the Hôtel de Ville (City Hall) in Clermont-Ferrand
- 2001 - 2014 : Deputy in charge of the cultural policy at the City Hall of Clermont-Ferrand
- 2008 : Vice-president of Clermont Communauté and President of the Culture Commission of the Assemblée des Communautés de France
- 2010 : President of the Board of Directors of the École supérieure d'art de Clermont-Ferrand
- 2014: Mayor of Clermont-Ferrand and President of Clermont Communauté
- 2015 : President of the supervisory board at the CHU of Clermont-Ferrand.
- 2020 : Re-election as Mayor of Clermont and President of Clermont Métropole

== Bibliography ==
- Olivier Bianchi, « Mythes, légendes et représentations du syndicalisme étudiant : l'AGEC-UNEF entre mémoire et histoire », dans la revue Siècles, Cahiers du Centre d'Histoire Espaces et cultures - Université Blaise-Pascal 1998, p. 103-114
