= Florence Parly =

French politician (born 1963)

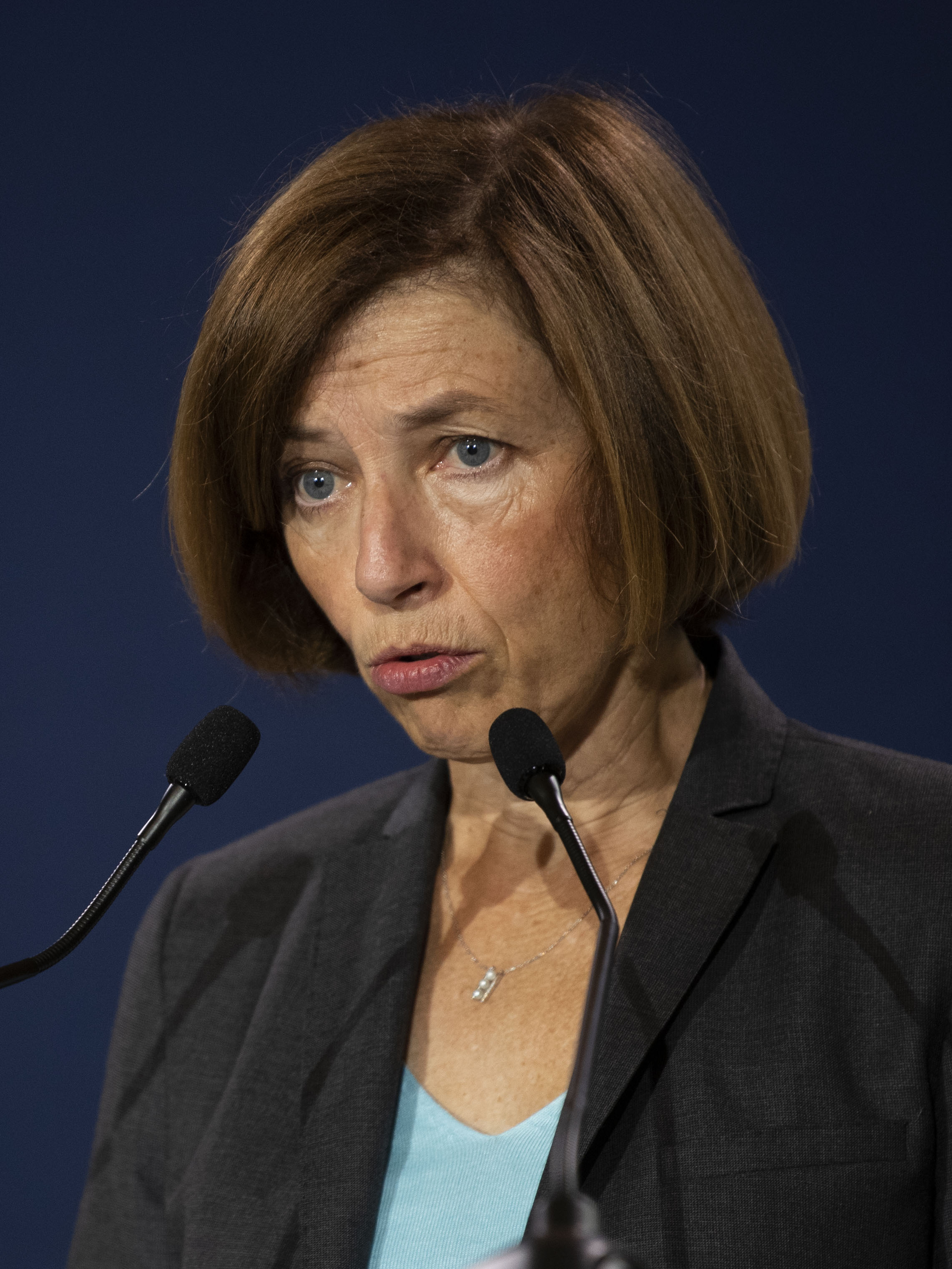

Minister of the Armed Forces
- In office 21 June 2017 – 20 May 2022
- Prime Minister: Édouard Philippe; Jean Castex
- Preceded by: Sylvie Goulard
- Succeeded by: Sébastien Lecornu

Secretary of State for the Budget
- In office 3 January 2000 – 6 May 2002
- Prime Minister: Lionel Jospin
- Preceded by: Christian Sautter
- Succeeded by: Alain Lambert

President of the Conservatoire national des arts et métiers
- Incumbent
- Assumed office 2 May 2023
- Preceded by: Stéphane Israël

Personal details
- Born: Florence Marie Jeanne Parly; 8 May 1963 (age 63) Boulogne-Billancourt, France
- Party: Renaissance (2022–present)
- Other political affiliations: Socialist Party (1995–2006); Territories of Progress (2020–2022)
- Education: Sciences Po; École nationale d'administration

Florence Marie Jeanne Parly (French pronunciation: [flɔʁɑ̃s paʁli]; born 8 May 1963) is a French politician who served as Minister of the Armed Forces under President Emmanuel Macron from 2017 to 2022. A former member of the Socialist Party (PS), she previously served as Secretary of State for the Budget from 2000 to 2002 under President Jacques Chirac.

== Career ==
An alumna of Sciences Po and the École nationale d'administration, Parly was appointed budgetary affairs advisor to Prime Minister Lionel Jospin in 1997. She became Secretary of State for the Budget in his government on 3 January 2000. In office until 6 May 2002, she seconded Christian Sautter, then Laurent Fabius at the Ministry of Finance.

She ran in Yonne's 1st constituency as a Socialist in the 2002 legislative election, but was defeated in the second round by Jean-Pierre Soisson of the Union for a Popular Movement.

After briefly serving as a member of the Regional Council of Burgundy for Yonne from 2004 to 2006, holding a vice presidency under François Patriat, Parly worked at Air France as deputy general director from 2006 until 2014, where she was in charge of passenger activity at Orly Airport and stopovers in France.

In 2014, Parly moved on to become director-general of SNCF Voyageurs until 2017.

=== Minister of the Armed Forces ===
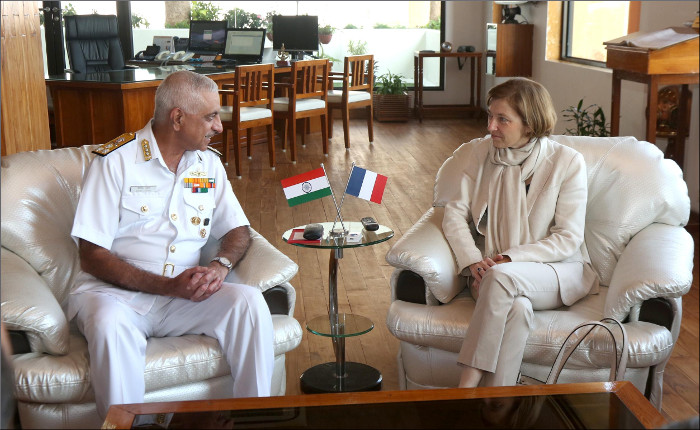
Florence Parly and Indian Navy Vice Admiral Girish Luthra in 2017

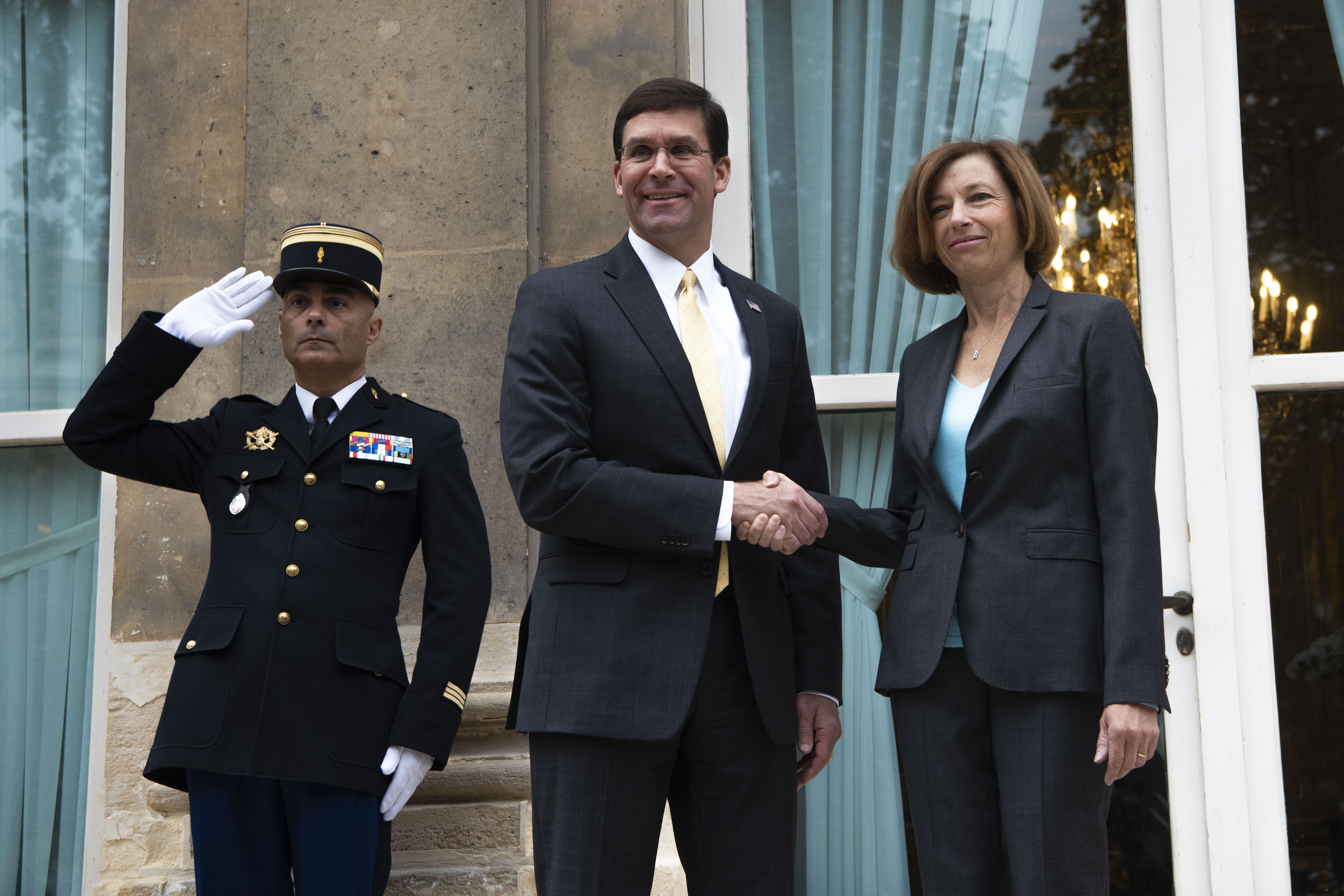
Parly with US Defense Secretary Mark Esper at the Hôtel de Brienne in 2019

Parly was named Minister of the Armed Forces on 21 June 2017 after Sylvie Goulard was forced to resign due to an ongoing investigation of her party.

Following the nomination, she resigned from all her board positions; her husband Martin Vial withdrew from his position on the board of Thales Group.

Parly's tenure as Armed Forces Minister was marked by the 2021 Tribune des généraux published in Valeurs actuelles, which spanned talk of a coup d'état after tens of retired army officers openly criticised Macron's leadership in the fight against Islamism and warned of a possible civil war.

==== Internal investigations ====
Shortly after taking office, Parly ordered an investigation into allegations brought forward by the satirical weekly Le Canard enchaîné that the acting head of the French Air Force borrowed a Dassault/Dornier Alpha Jet on weekends to fly from his base in Bordeaux to his home in Provence.

In 2020, Parly placed a French lieutenant colonel, based in Italy and stationed with NATO, under investigation over a suspected breach of security after having passed sensitive documents to the Russian secret services.

==== International crises ====
Regarding the Iran Nuclear Deal, Parly told BFM TV in 2019 that "nothing would be worse than Iran leaving this deal. We absolutely want to keep this agreement alive". Following the US-led Baghdad airstrike in January 2020 that killed Iranian Quds Force leader Qasem Soleimani, Parly rejected pressure to withdraw French troops from Iraq, even stating on her Twitter account that France had already reinforced security for its 160 soldiers stationed in Iraq. She further reiterated that it was the French government's priority to fight against ISIS militants, who were re-merging in the area. Parly also warned Iran not to escalate tensions.

Under Parly's leadership, France joined military exercises with Italy, Greece and Cyprus in the Eastern Mediterranean amid a worsening dispute between Turkey and Greece over energy resources in the region in 2020. During that conflict, Parly underlined that France would stand by Greece and Cyprus. On her initiative, NATO investigated French accusations that the Turkish Naval Forces failed to respond to an allied call to inspect a vessel in the Mediterranean, an incident suspected to involve Turkish arms smuggling to Libya.

By mid-2021, Parly oversaw the phase-out of Operation Barkhane with some 5,100 soldiers across the Sahel region, and its transition into the Takuba Task Force. As part of Operation Barkhane, she also authorized the killing of al Qaeda leader Baye ag Bakabo in June 2021; Bakabo had been determined the chief suspect for having abducted and shot Radio France Internationale journalists Claude Verlon and Ghislaine Dupont in November 2013.

The announcement of the AUKUS security pact between the United States, the United Kingdom, and Australia in September 2021 sparked a period of diplomatic tensions in French-American and French-Australian relations. The French government received official notification from Australia that the Attack-class submarine project, involving a A$90 billion Australian contract to buy 12 French submarines, was to be cancelled only a few hours before it was publicly announced. In a joint statement, Parly and French foreign minister Jean-Yves Le Drian expressed disappointment at Australia's decision to abandon their joint submarine program with France.

==== Military procurement ====
In 2022, Parly led talks with Ministry of Defense Prabowo Subianto over Indonesia's decision to order 42 Dassault Rafale fighter jets in a $8.1 billion deal, making Jakarta the biggest French arms client in the Indo-Pacific region.

== Other activities ==
=== Corporate boards ===
- Air France-KLM, Chairwoman of the Board
- Caisse des dépôts et consignations, Member of the Supervisory Board
- Ipsos, Member of the Board of Directors (since 2023)
- Newcleo, Member of the Board of Directors (since 2023)
- Altran, Member of the Board of Directors (–2017)
- Ingenico, Member of the Board of Directors (–2017)
- Zodiac Aerospace, Member of the Board of Directors (2016–2017)
- Banque Publique d'Investissement, Member of the Board of Directors (–2015)
- Servair, Member of the Board of Directors (–2014)
- Jolt Capital, Senior Advisor (since 2023)

=== Non-profit organisations ===
- National Conservatory of Arts and Crafts (CNAM), chair of the Board of Directors (since 2023)

== Honours ==
- Officer of the Legion of Honour
- Officer of the Ordre national du Mérite

Political offices
Preceded by Christian Sautter	State Secretary for the Budget; 2000–2002	Succeeded by Alain Lambert
Preceded by Sylvie Goulard	Minister of the Armed Forces; 2017–2022	Succeeded by Sébastien Lecornu
