= Alain Lambert =

French politician

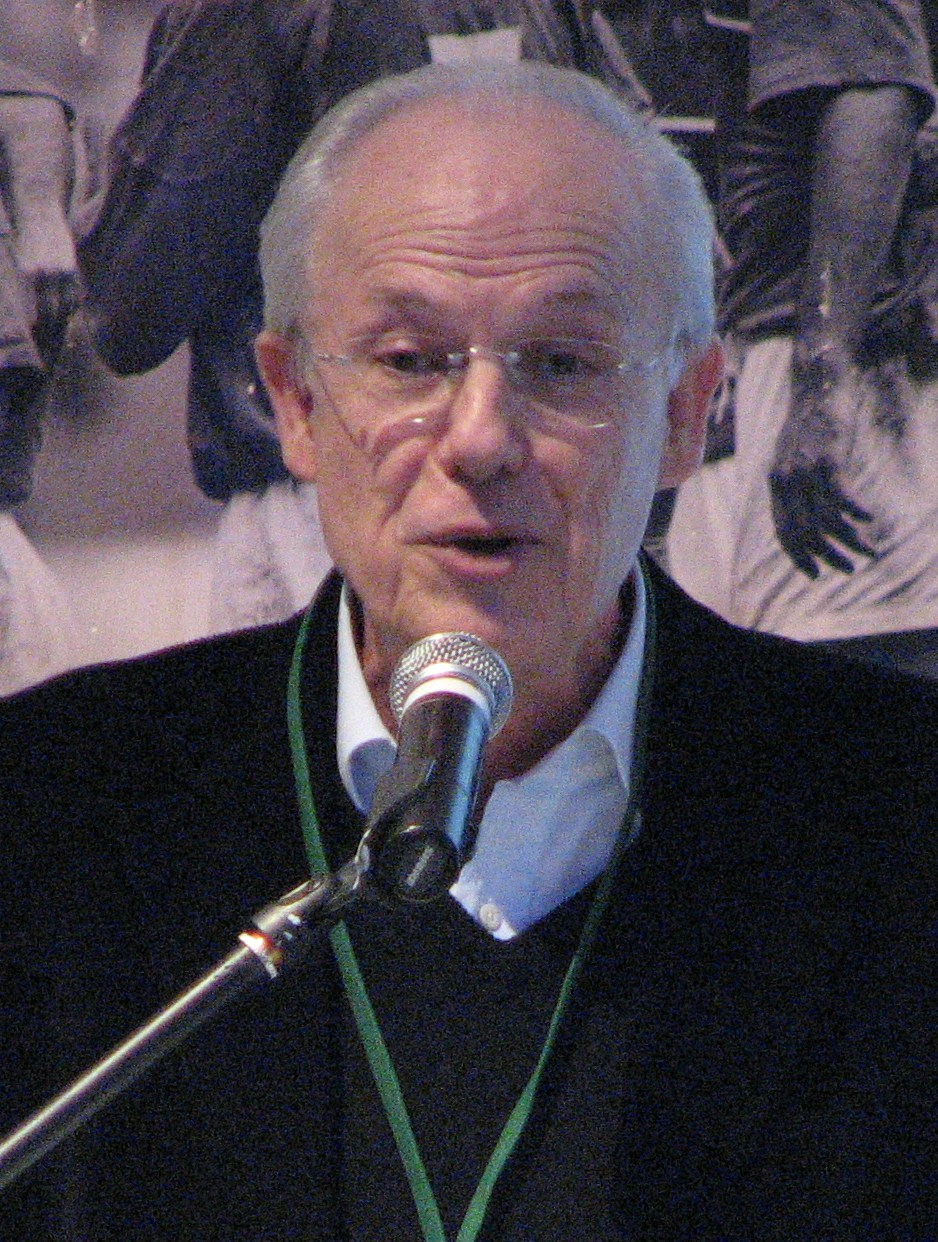

Member of the Departemental council of Orne
- Incumbent
- Assumed office 2 April 2015

French Minister of Budget
- In office 2002–2004
- President: Jacques Chirac
- Prime Minister: Jean-Pierre Raffarin
- Preceded by: Florence Parly
- Succeeded by: Dominique Bussereau

Mayor of Alençon
- In office 1989–2002
- Preceded by: Pierre Mauger
- Succeeded by: Christine Roimier

Personal details
- Born: 20 July 1946 (age 79) Alençon, France
- Party: UDI
- Profession: Notary

Alain Lambert (French pronunciation: [alɛ̃ lɑ̃bɛʁ]; born 20 July 1946 in Alençon) is a French politician and a notary by profession.

Lambert has been involved in politics since 1983 and has served as a local councillor in Alençon and a councillor on both the department council of Orne (1992–2002) and the regional council of Lower Normandy. Between 7 May 2002 and 30 March 2004 he was France's Finance Minister. In 2009 he attempted to be chosen to head the centre right wing UMP list for the 2010 regional elections and was successful, gaining 54.5% of the votes of party members. However, Lambert was later forced to announce he would not stand, due to disagreements within the party over his candidature.

Ahead of the 2012 presidential election, Lambert endorsed François Bayrou's candidacy as President of France.
