= Roger Quilliot =

French politician

Minister of Housing
- In office 1981–1983
- President: François Mitterrand
- Prime Minister: Pierre Mauroy
- Preceded by: Marcel Cavaillé
- Succeeded by: Paul Quilès

Mayor of Clermont-Ferrand
- In office 1973–1997
- Preceded by: Gabriel Montpied
- Succeeded by: Serge Godard

Personal details
- Born: 19 June 1925 Hermaville, France
- Died: 17 July 1998 (aged 73) Clermont-Ferrand, France
- Party: Socialist Party

Roger Quilliot (French: [ʁɔʒe kijɔ]; 19 June 1925 – 17 July 1998) was a French politician. He served as Housing Minister from May 22 to June 23, 1981, under former French President François Mitterrand. He was also a Socialist member of the French Senate for the Puy-de-Dôme from 1974 to 1981, then from 1983 to April 1998, and again from September 1986 to 1998. He also served as the mayor of Clermont-Ferrand from 1973 to 1998.

== Biography ==
Roger Quilliot was born on June 19, 1925, in Hermaville, France. He received a PhD and the agrégation in Literature, and he edited the oeuvre of Albert Camus in La Pléiade. He was a personal friend of Camus's. Politically, he was close to Gaston Defferre and Pierre Mauroy.

He committed suicide on July 17, 1998. He was survived by his wife, Claire Quilliot. The Musée d'Art Roger-Quilliot in Clermont-Ferrand was named after him.

== Bibliography ==
- La liberté aux dimensions humaines (1967)
- L'homme sur le pavois (1982, with Claire Quilliot)
- Mémoires (1999, posthumous)
- Mémoires II (2001, with Claire Quilliot, posthumous)
