= Louis-Charles-François Ledru =

French architect

- Born: 1778; Paris, France
- Died: September 16, 1861 (aged 82–83); Clermont-Ferrand, France
- Education: École Polytechnique
- Occupation: Architect
- Children: Agis-Léon Ledru
- Relatives: Louis-Antoine-Marie Ledru Gaultier de Biauzat (grandson)

Louis-Charles-François Ledru (French: [lwi ʃaʁl fʁɑ̃swa lədry]; 1778–1861) was a French architect.

== Early life ==
Louis-Charles-François Ledru was born in 1778 in Paris, France. He graduated from the École Polytechnique, where Gaspard Monge was one of his professors. He subsequently took a course in architecture taught by Jean-Nicolas-Louis Durand.

== Career ==
Ledru became a member of the Académie royale d'architecture circa 1794.

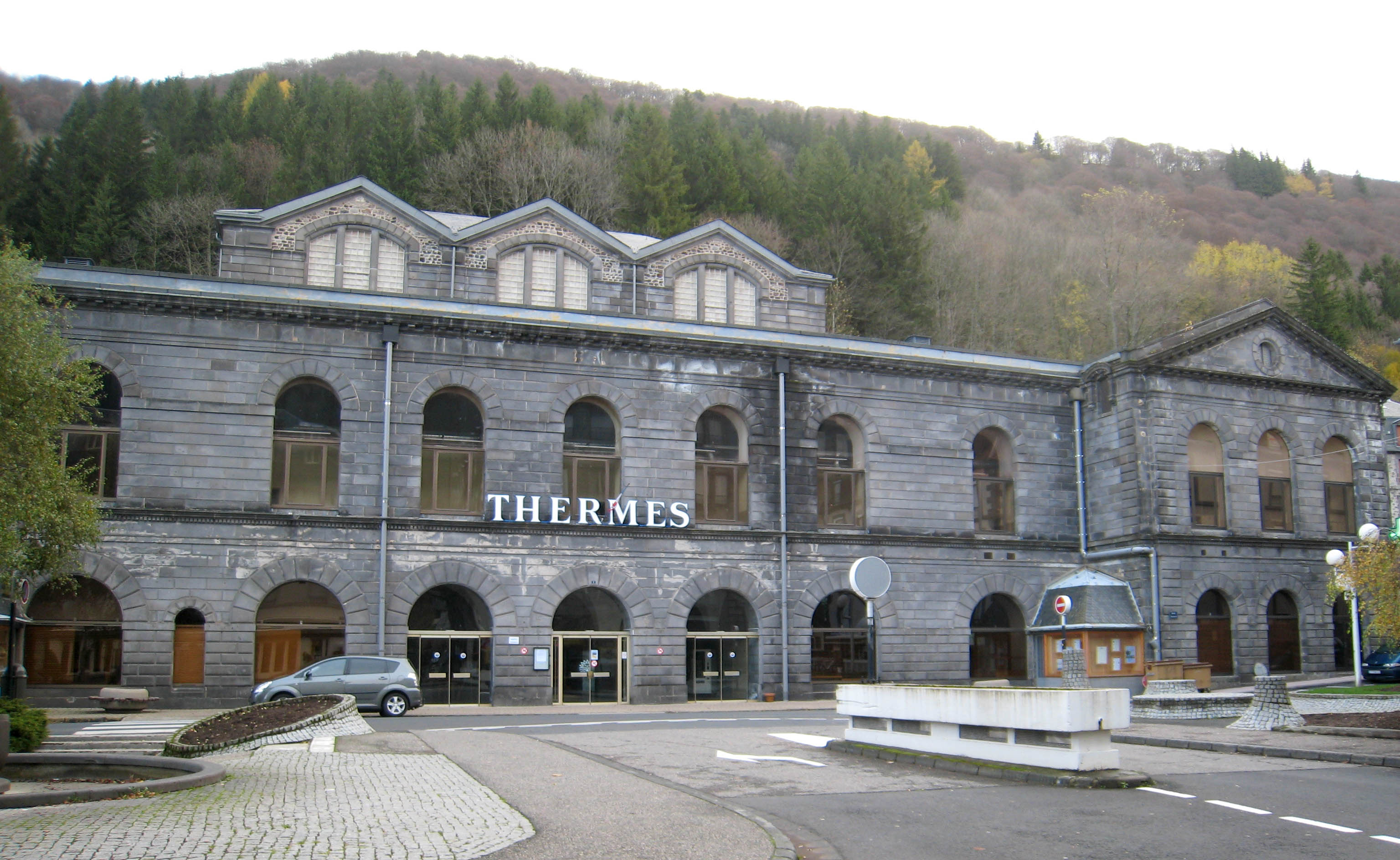
The spa in Le Mont-Dore, designed by Ledru.

Ledru moved to the Auvergne in 1810, where he started a business in asphalt extraction. By 1811, he designed the spa in Le Mont-Dore. By 1820, he designed the Hôtel de Ville complex, which included the town hall, courthouse and prison, as well as the slaughterhouse, the market, etc., in Clermont-Ferrand, where he was appointed as chief architect in 1823. He also designed the courthouse in Thiers and a government building in Ambert.

Ledru was awarded the Legion of Honour in 1841.

== Philanthropy ==
With Mayor Antoine Blatin, Ledru co-founded a school in Clermont-Ferrand where mathematics, architecture and drawing were taught free of charge.

== Death ==
Ledru died on September 16, 1861.
