= Hôtel de Ville, Clermont-Ferrand =

Town hall in Clermont-Ferrand, France

Hôtel de Ville
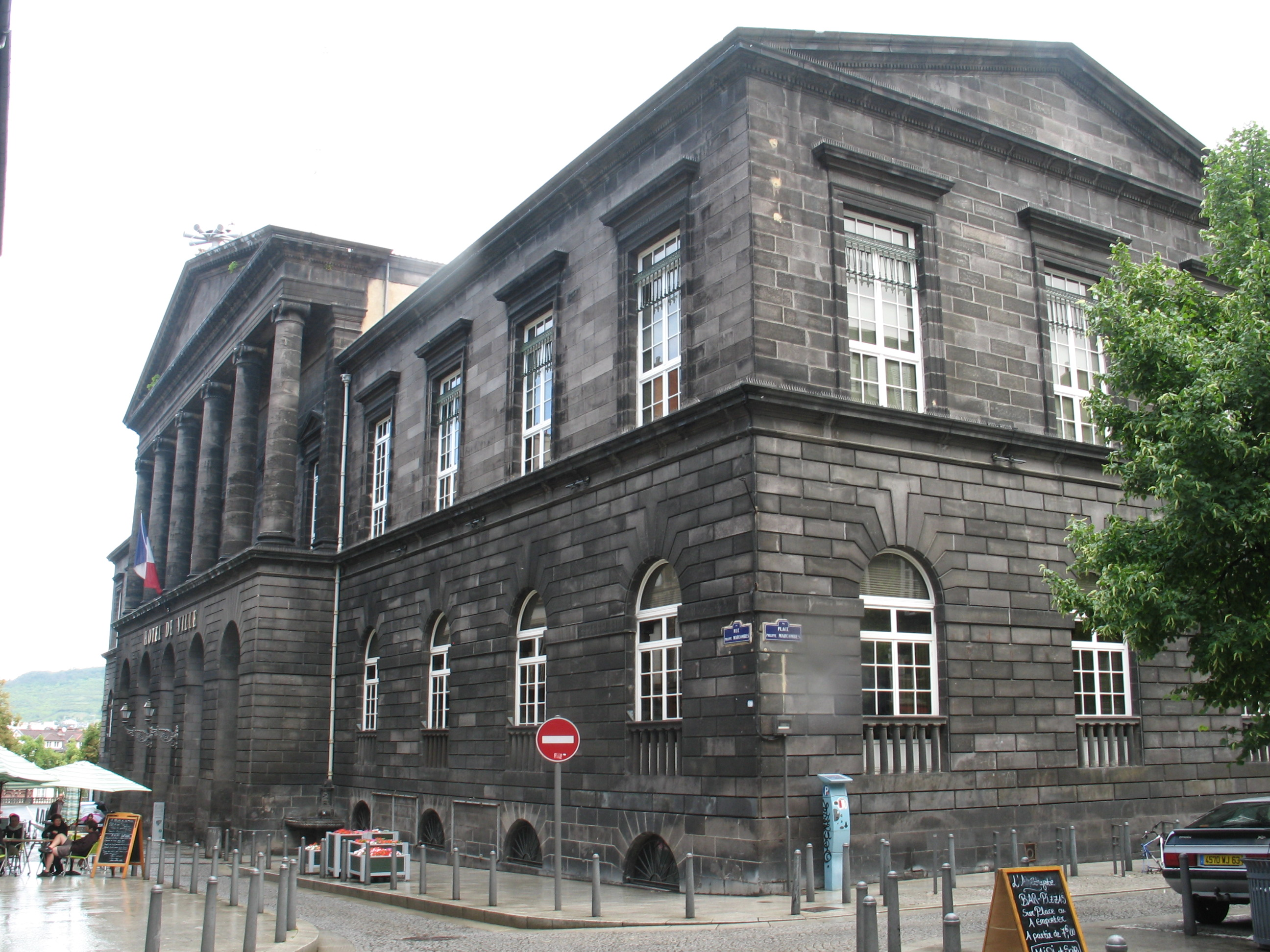
- The main frontage of the Hôtel de Ville in July 2011
- Interactive map of the Hôtel de Ville area

General information
- Type: City hall
- Architectural style: Neoclassical style
- Location: Clermont-Ferrand, France
- Coordinates: 45.7797°N 3.0865°E
- Completed: 1844

Design and construction
- Architect: Louis-Charles-François Ledru

The Hôtel de Ville (French pronunciation: [otɛl də vil], City Hall) is a historic building in Clermont-Ferrand, Puy-de-Dôme, central France, standing on the Rue Philippe Marcombes.

== History ==
Early meetings of the local council were held at Saint-Barthélemy Hospital on the Rue des Gras under the supervision of the Bishop of Clermont, before a building in Place Thomas was acquired for this purpose in 1484. By the early 18th century, the building was very dilapidated, and repairs were carried out in 1715. In the early 19th century, the council decided to commission a more substantial building, which would act as a town hall, courthouse and prison. The site they selected on Rue Philippe Marcombes was occupied by the ancient Palais de Boulogne, which dated back at least to 1200 and had been the home of Robert V and successive Counts of Boulogne, before Catherine de' Medici gave it to the council for use as a courthouse and prison in 1578.

After the palais was demolished, work began on the prison wing in 1823, on the courthouse wing in 1826, and on the town hall wing in 1829. The complex was designed by Louis-Charles-François Ledru in the neoclassical style, built in black volcanic rock and was completed in 1844.

The complex was laid out with the prison at the rear, the courthouse at the front and the town hall in the north wing. The design involved a symmetrical main frontage of 13 bays facing onto Rue Philippe Marcombes. The central section of five bays, which was projected forward, was arcaded on the ground floor and featured a hexastyle portico on the first floor, formed by Ionic order columns supporting an entablature and a modillioned pediment. The arcaded entrance led to a courtyard behind. The wings, of four bays each, were fenestrated by rounded headed windows with voussoirs on the ground floor, and with casement windows with cornices on the first floor, with a main cornice at roof level. Internally, the principal room was the grand hall, which was used for the first time at a grand ball, even before the complex was completed, in January 1840.

The complex ceased operating in a custodial capacity after the prison in Riom was completed in 1860. In June 1940, during the Second World War, the complex was occupied by the 1st SS Panzer Division Leibstandarte SS Adolf Hitler under the command of Obergruppenführer Sepp Dietrich. In October 1940, it was the place where the former ministers, Jean Zay and Pierre Mendès France, were put on trial by the Vichy regime for desertion after they boarded the liner SS Massilia for Casablanca in Morocco to continue the fight against the Nazis. The complex ceased to serve as a courthouse after the local judiciary relocated to the Cité Judiciaire in the Place de l'Étoile in 1992. These departures enabled the council to take over the whole complex by the end of the 20th century.
