= Hermaville =

- Commune
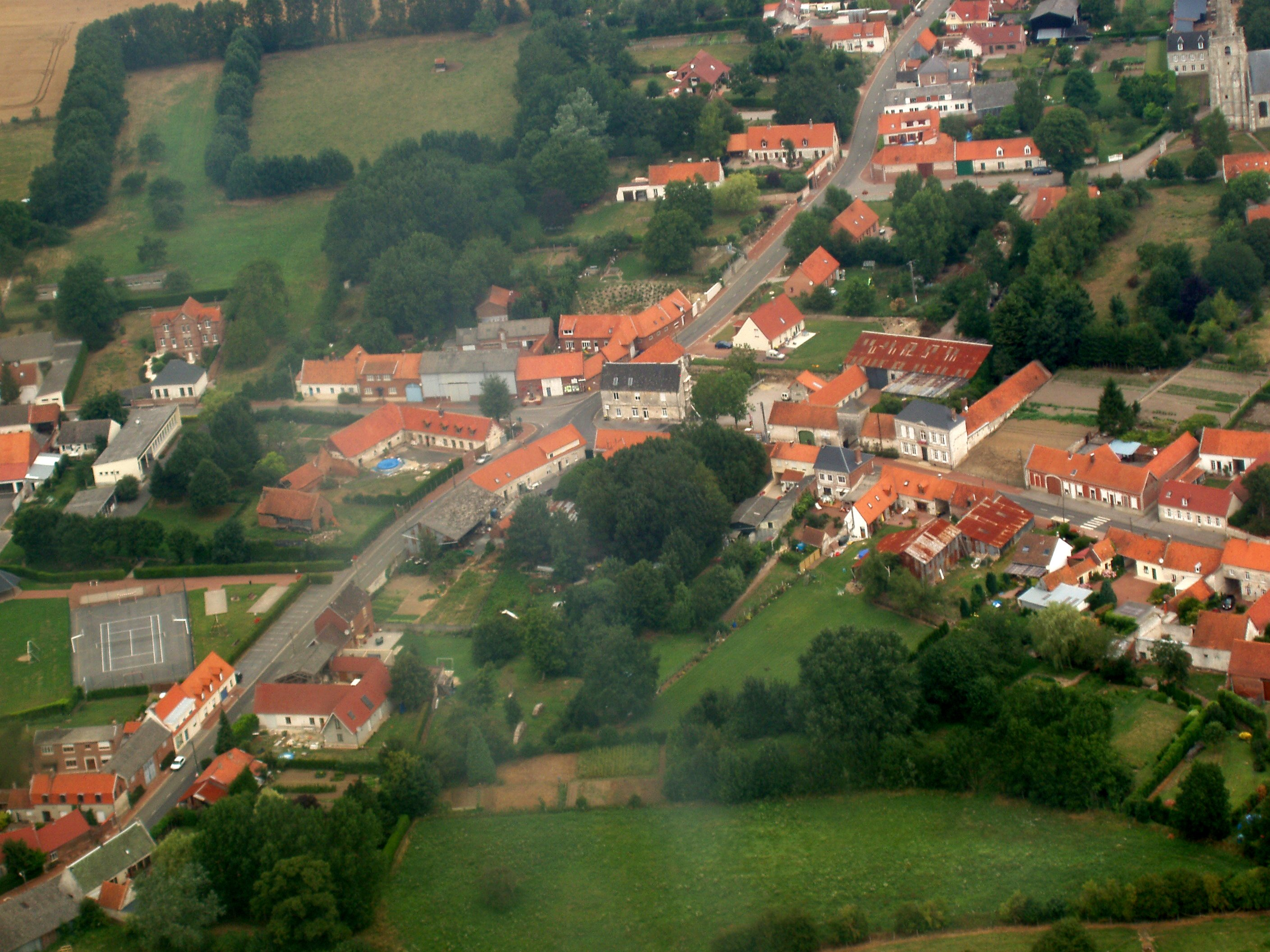
- An aerial view of Hermaville

- Coat of arms
- Location of Hermaville
- Location within France Location within Hauts-de-France
- Coordinates: 50°19′24″N 2°35′14″E
- Country: France
- Region: Hauts-de-France
- Department: Pas-de-Calais
- Arrondissement: Arras
- Canton: Avesnes-le-Comte
- Intercommunality: CC Campagnes de l'Artois

Government
  - Mayor (2020–2026): Michel Accart
- Area^{1}: 6.32 km^{2} (2.44 sq mi)
- Elevation: 94 m (308 ft)
- Highest elevation: 142 m (466 ft)
- Lowest elevation: 85 m (279 ft)
- Population (2023): 529
  - Density: 83.7/km^{2} (217/sq mi)
- Time zone: UTC+01:00 (CET)
  - Summer (DST): UTC+02:00 (CEST)
- INSEE/Postal code: 62438 /62690
- ^{1} French Land Register data, which excludes lakes, ponds, glaciers > 1 km^{2} (0.386 sq mi or 247 acres) and river estuaries.

Hermaville (French pronunciation: [ɛʁmavil]) is a commune in the Pas-de-Calais department in the Hauts-de-France region of France 8 miles (13 km) west of Arras.

== Population ==
Historical population
Year	Pop.	±% p.a.
1968	329	—
1975	313	−0.71%
1982	402	+3.64%
1990	456	+1.59%
1999	455	−0.02%
2007	527	+1.85%
2012	535	+0.30%
2017	540	+0.19%
2023	529	−0.34%
Source: INSEE

== See also ==
- Communes of the Pas-de-Calais department
