= Vodable =

- Commune
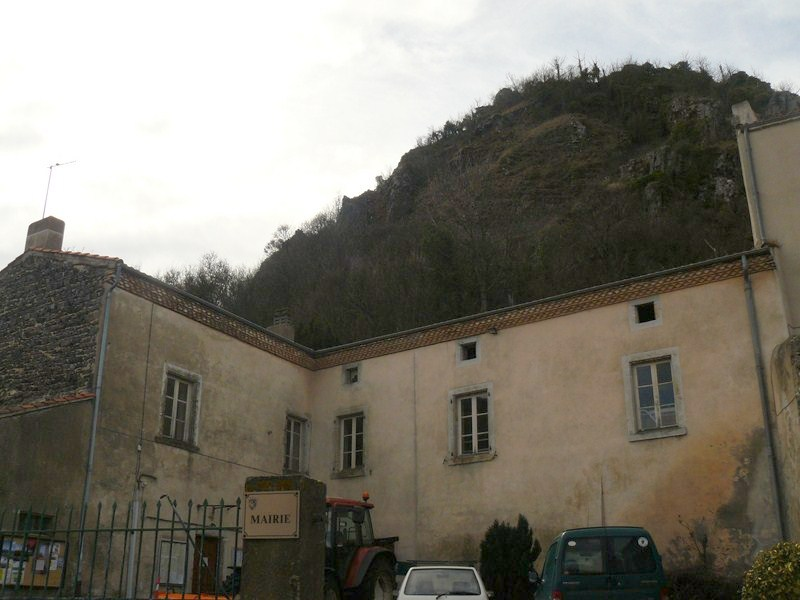
- The town hall in Vodable

- Coat of arms
- Location of Vodable
- Location within France Location within Auvergne-Rhône-Alpes
- Coordinates: 45°30′31″N 3°08′51″E
- Country: France
- Region: Auvergne-Rhône-Alpes
- Department: Puy-de-Dôme
- Arrondissement: Issoire
- Canton: Le Sancy
- Intercommunality: Agglo Pays d'Issoire

Government
  - Mayor (2026–32): Jean-Marc Labussière
- Area^{1}: 11.68 km^{2} (4.51 sq mi)
- Elevation: 690 m (2,260 ft)
- Highest elevation: 946 m (3,104 ft)
- Lowest elevation: 552 m (1,811 ft)
- Population (2023): 194
  - Density: 16.6/km^{2} (43.0/sq mi)
- Time zone: UTC+01:00 (CET)
  - Summer (DST): UTC+02:00 (CEST)
- INSEE/Postal code: 63466 /63500
- ^{1} French Land Register data, which excludes lakes, ponds, glaciers > 1 km^{2} (0.386 sq mi or 247 acres) and river estuaries.

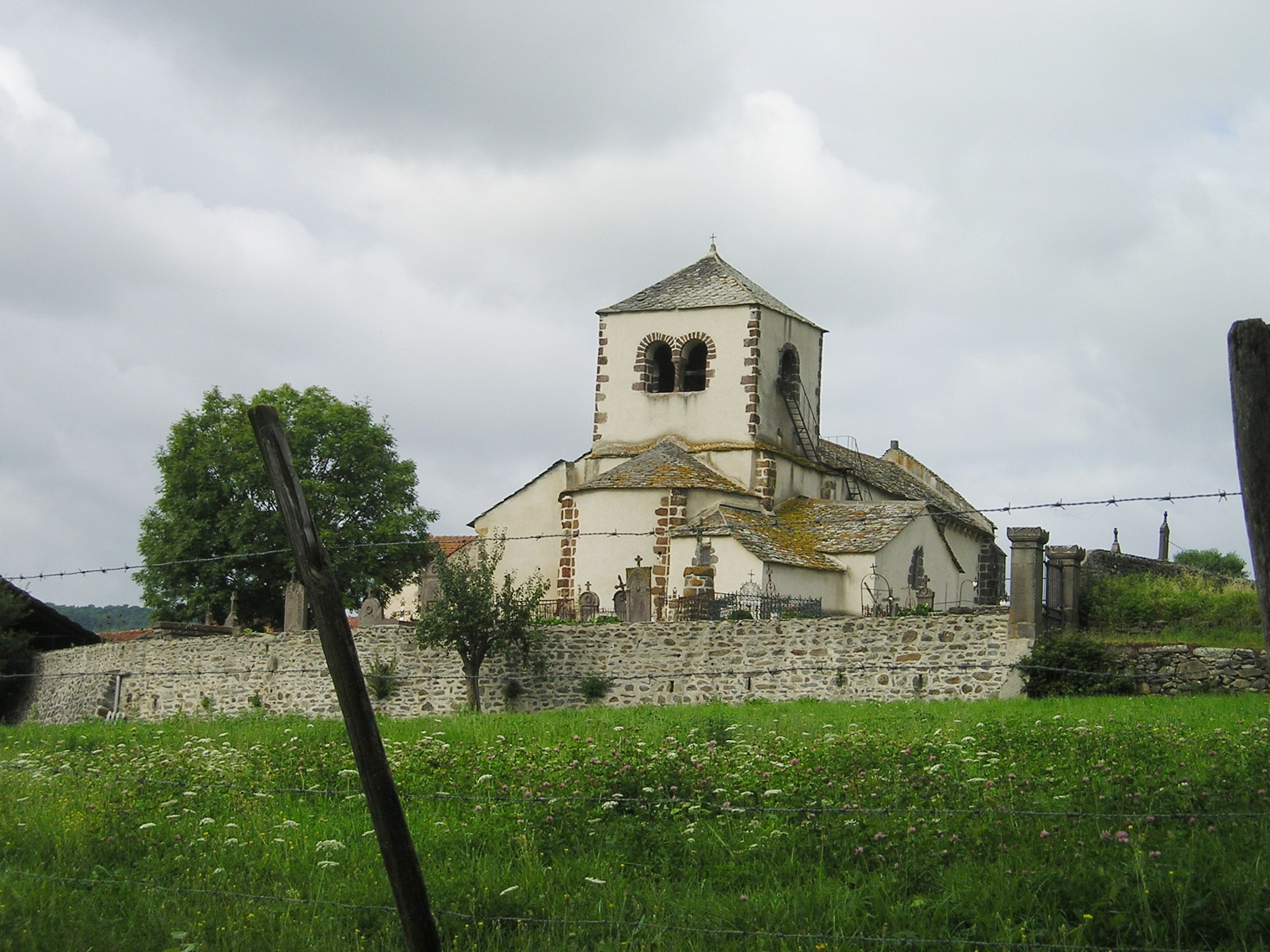
Historic church.

Vodable (French pronunciation: [vɔdabl]) is a commune in the Puy-de-Dôme department in Auvergne in central France.

== Buildings ==
- Saint-Mary de Colamine Church

== See also ==
- Communes of the Puy-de-Dôme department
