= Michel Charasse =

French politician (1941–2020)

Member of the Constitutional Council
- In office 12 March 2010 – 11 March 2019
- Appointed by: Nicolas Sarkozy
- President: Jean-Louis Debré; Laurent Fabius
- Preceded by: Olivier Dutheillet de Lamothe
- Succeeded by: Jacques Mézard

Member of the French Senate for Puy-de-Dôme
- In office 2 October 1992 – 6 March 2010
- Succeeded by: Serge Godard

Minister of Budget
- In office 26 June 1988 – 2 April 1992
- President: François Mitterrand
- Prime Minister: Édith Cresson; Pierre Bérégovoy
- Preceded by: Pierre Bérégovoy
- Succeeded by: Martin Malvy

Mayor of Puy-Guillaume
- In office 1977–2010
- Succeeded by: Nadine Chabrier

Personal details
- Born: 8 July 1941 Chamalières, France
- Died: 21 February 2020 (aged 78) Clermont-Ferrand, France
- Party: Socialist Party
- Spouse: Danièlle Bas (m. 1978)
- Parent(s): Martial Charasse; Lucie Castellani
- Education: Sciences Po

Michel Charasse (8 July 1941 – 21 February 2020) was a member of the French Senate. He represented the Puy-de-Dôme department, and was a member of the Socialist Party.

== Biography ==
His father was from Auvergne and his mother from Corsica. During the mandate of François Mitterrand, he was the President's special advisor. He was appointed Minister of Budget in 1988.

In his book Guerres secrètes à l'Elysée, Gilles Ménage linked Charasse to the hypothetical murder of François de Grossouvre.

On 24 February 2010, French President Nicolas Sarkozy nominated him as a member of the Constitutional Council.
