= Agis-Léon Ledru =

French architect and politician

- Born: May 31, 1816; Clermont-Ferrand, Puy-de-Dôme, France
- Died: October 5, 1885 (aged 69)
- Education: École des Beaux-Arts
- Occupations: Architect, politician
- Children: Louis-Antoine-Marie Ledru Gaultier de Biauzat
- Parent: Louis-Charles-François Ledru
- Relatives: Jean-François Gaultier de Biauzat (great-grandfather)

Agis-Léon Ledru (1816-1885) was a French architect and politician.

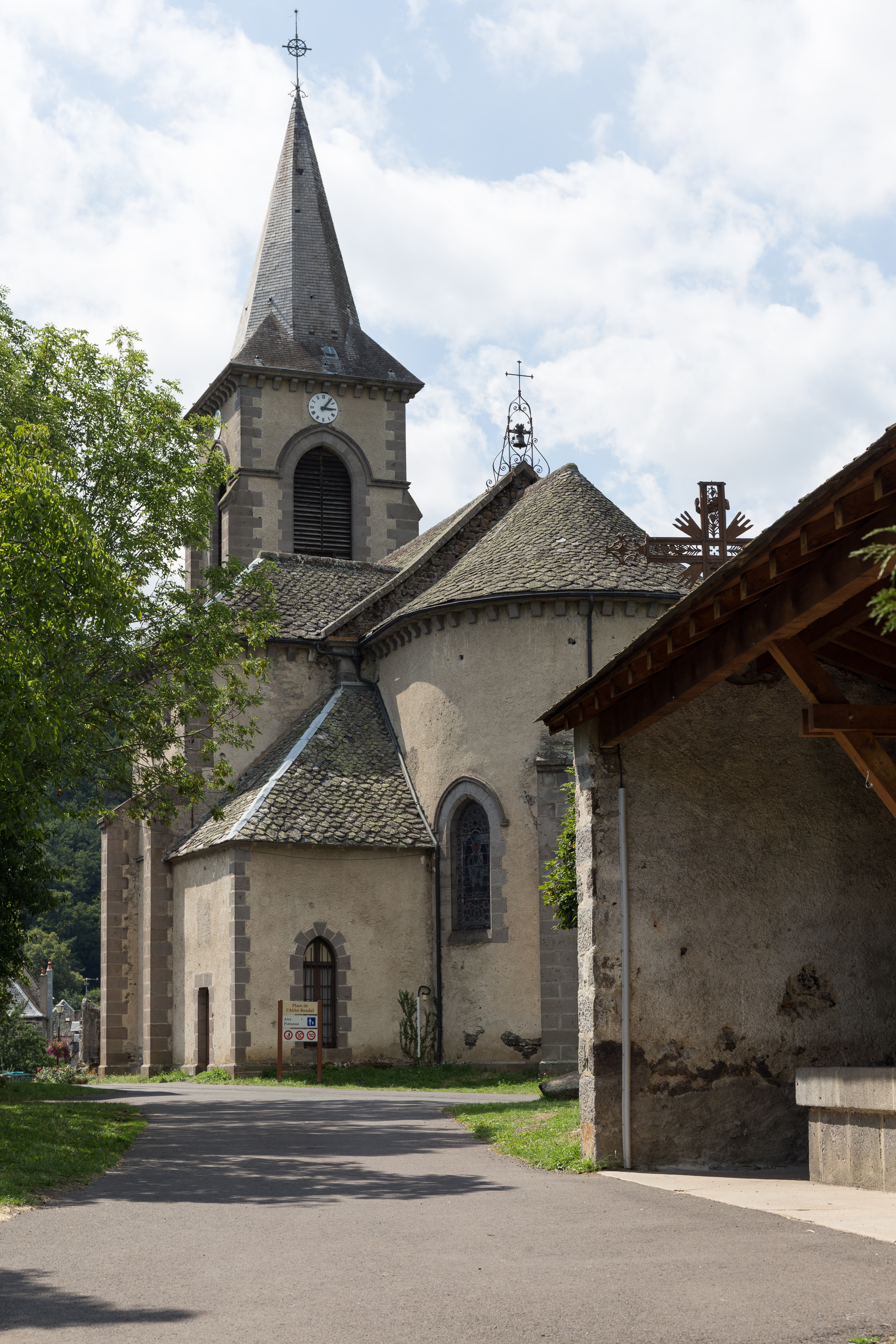
The Église Saint-Ferréol, designed by Ledru.

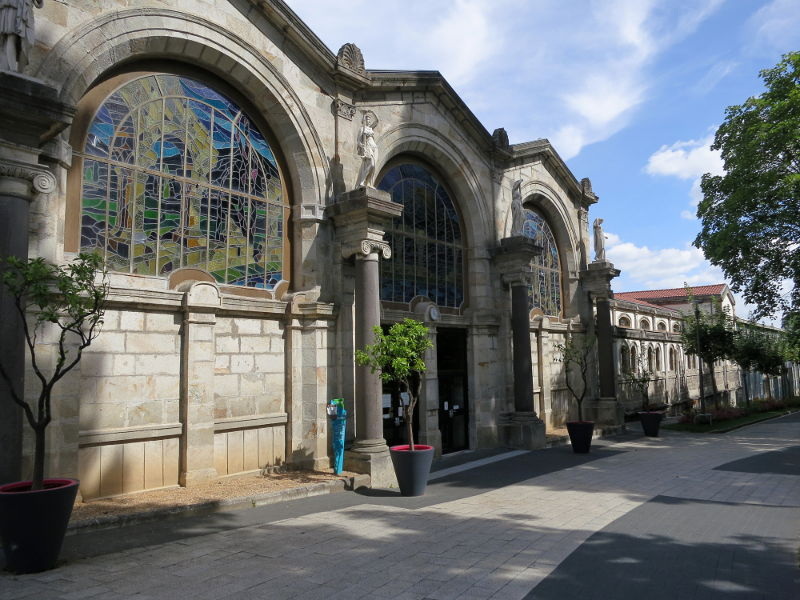
The Spa in Royat, designed by Ledru.

== Early life ==
Agis-Léon Ledru was born in 1816. His father, Louis-Charles-François Ledru, was an architect.

Ledru graduated from the École des Beaux-Arts in Paris in 1837, where Louis-Hippolyte Lebas and Jean-Nicolas Huyot were his professors.

== Career ==
Ledru was an architect in the Puy-de-Dôme. Some of the buildings he designed, like the Église Saint-Ferréol in Murol, are listed as official historic monuments. He also designed the spas in La Bourboule, Chamalières and Royat. Additionally, he designed a convent, a school and a fountain in Riom.

Meanwhile, Ledru served as the mayor of Clermont-Ferrand from 1871 to 1873 or 1874.

== Death ==
Ledru died in 1885.
