= Mont-Dore =

- Commune
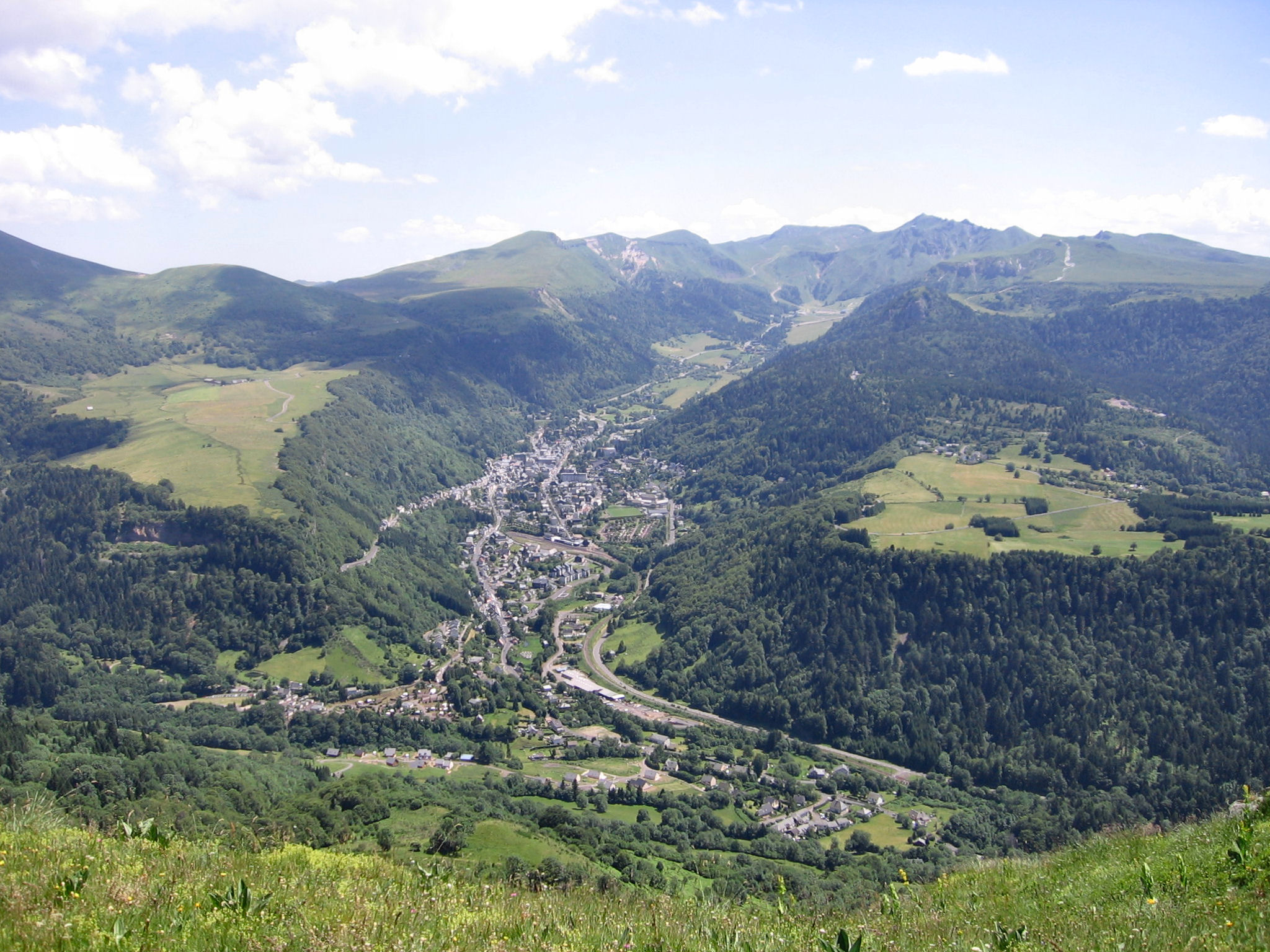
- Mont-Dore with the Puy de Sancy in the background

- Coat of arms
- Location of Mont-Dore
- Location within France Location within Auvergne-Rhône-Alpes
- Coordinates: 45°34′38″N 2°48′35″E
- Country: France
- Region: Auvergne-Rhône-Alpes
- Department: Puy-de-Dôme
- Arrondissement: Issoire
- Canton: Le Sancy
- Intercommunality: Massif du Sancy

Government
  - Mayor (2020–2026): Sébastien Dubourg
- Area^{1}: 35.87 km^{2} (13.85 sq mi)
- Elevation: 1,050 m (3,440 ft)
- Highest elevation: 1,883 m (6,178 ft)
- Lowest elevation: 897 m (2,943 ft)
- Population (2023): 1,163
  - Density: 32.42/km^{2} (83.97/sq mi)
- Time zone: UTC+01:00 (CET)
  - Summer (DST): UTC+02:00 (CEST)
- INSEE/Postal code: 63236 /63240
- ^{1} French Land Register data, which excludes lakes, ponds, glaciers > 1 km^{2} (0.386 sq mi or 247 acres) and river estuaries.

Mont-Dore (French pronunciation: [mɔ̃ dɔʁ]; Mont Dòr in Auvergnat, and Mont-Dore-les-Bains), in common usage Le Mont-Dore, is a commune in the Puy-de-Dôme department in Auvergne-Rhône-Alpes in central France.

== Geography ==
Mont-Dore is located in the Massif Central, on the right bank of the Dordogne not far from its source, and 50 km (31 mi) by road southwest of Clermont-Ferrand. The Monts Dore close the valley towards the south.

=== Climate ===
Climate data for Mont-Dore, elevation 1,050 m (3,440 ft), (1991–2020 normals, extremes 1950–present)
Month	Jan	Feb	Mar	Apr	May	Jun	Jul	Aug	Sep	Oct	Nov	Dec	Year
Record high °C (°F)	17.6 (63.7)	23.4 (74.1)	22.6 (72.7)	25.8 (78.4)	28.8 (83.8)	36.0 (96.8)	34.5 (94.1)	34.8 (94.6)	29.1 (84.4)	25.7 (78.3)	21.5 (70.7)	18.7 (65.7)	36.0 (96.8)
Mean daily maximum °C (°F)	4.7 (40.5)	5.3 (41.5)	8.7 (47.7)	11.6 (52.9)	15.8 (60.4)	19.6 (67.3)	21.9 (71.4)	21.9 (71.4)	17.7 (63.9)	13.6 (56.5)	8.0 (46.4)	5.2 (41.4)	12.8 (55.0)
Daily mean °C (°F)	1.2 (34.2)	1.4 (34.5)	4.3 (39.7)	6.9 (44.4)	10.6 (51.1)	14.1 (57.4)	16.1 (61.0)	16.0 (60.8)	12.3 (54.1)	9.1 (48.4)	4.4 (39.9)	2.0 (35.6)	8.2 (46.8)
Mean daily minimum °C (°F)	−2.2 (28.0)	−2.5 (27.5)	−0.1 (31.8)	2.2 (36.0)	5.5 (41.9)	8.6 (47.5)	10.2 (50.4)	10.1 (50.2)	7.0 (44.6)	4.6 (40.3)	0.9 (33.6)	−1.3 (29.7)	3.6 (38.5)
Record low °C (°F)	−21.5 (−6.7)	−23.8 (−10.8)	−17.2 (1.0)	−10.4 (13.3)	−3.5 (25.7)	−2.0 (28.4)	1.6 (34.9)	1.0 (33.8)	−2.2 (28.0)	−7.9 (17.8)	−12.9 (8.8)	−18.8 (−1.8)	−23.8 (−10.8)
Average precipitation mm (inches)	161.3 (6.35)	145.7 (5.74)	139.7 (5.50)	153.5 (6.04)	152.9 (6.02)	124.6 (4.91)	119.2 (4.69)	111.0 (4.37)	132.0 (5.20)	152.0 (5.98)	195.6 (7.70)	195.8 (7.71)	1,783.3 (70.21)
Average precipitation days (≥ 1.0 mm)	15.1	13.7	12.7	13.8	14.5	11.2	10.3	10.6	11.5	13.5	15.8	15.1	157.7
Source: Meteociel

== Thermal springs ==
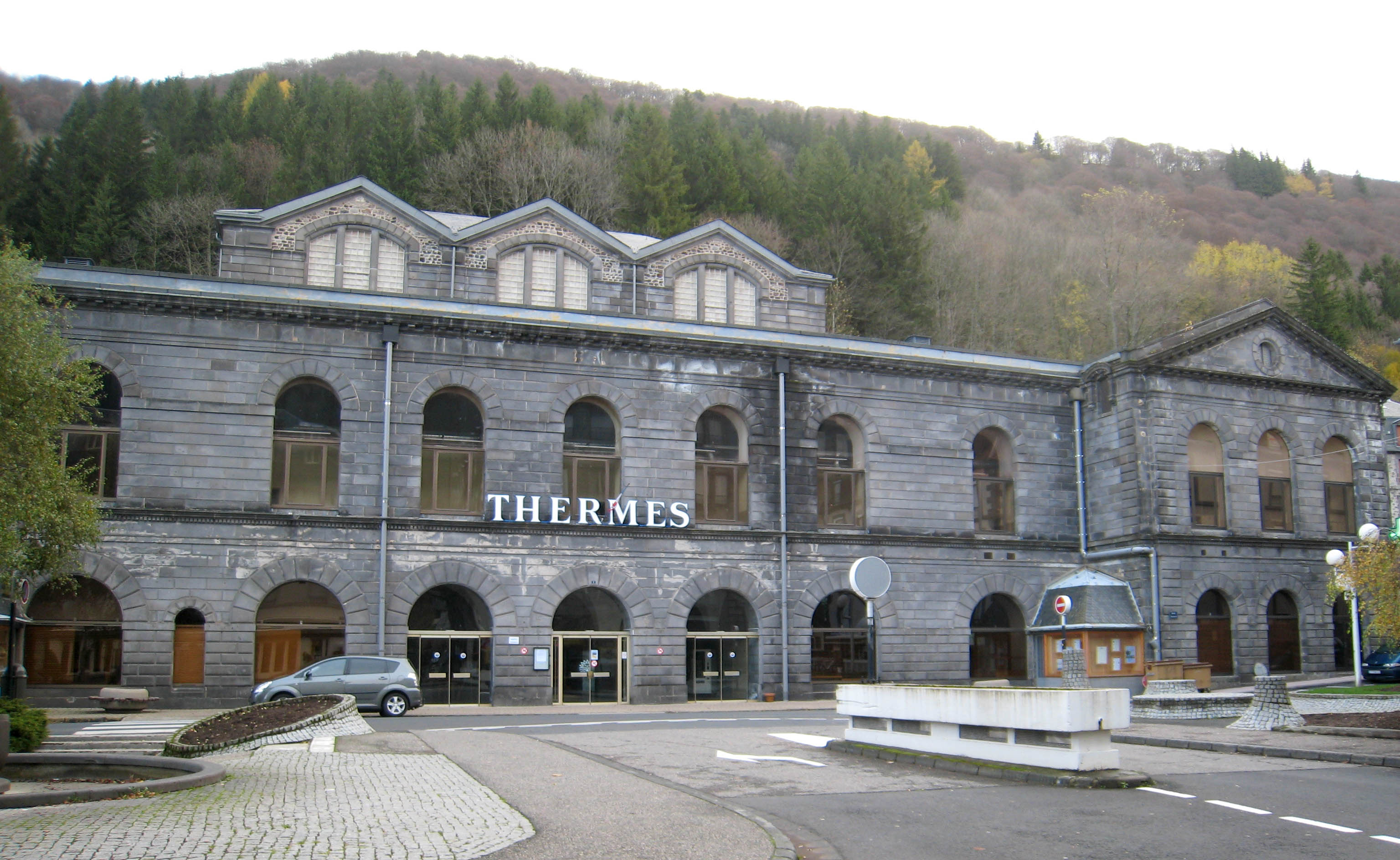
The baths

The thermal springs of Mont-Dore, now numbering twelve, were known to the Romans. The modern thermal establishment, which was built in 1817 by the French architect Louis-Charles-François Ledru, features Byzantine and Romanesque design influences.

Sodium bicarbonate, iron and arsenic are the principal ingredients of the springs, which are used both for drinking and bathing. Hot baths are characteristic of the treatment; they are believed to be efficacious for tuberculosis, bronchitis, asthma, and nervous and rheumatic paralysis. Due to the elevation and exposure of the valley, the climate of Mont-Dore is relatively severe, and the season only lasts from 15 June to 15 September. The bath-house was rebuilt in 1891–1894.

== Ski resort ==
Mont-Dore is a ski resort with runs on the slopes of the Puy de Sancy and the Puy Ferrand. Thirty runs account for 42 km of downhill skiing, served by a number of lifts of different types. There are also 25 km of cross-country trails.

== Tour de France ==
Mont-Dore is set to host the finish of stage 10 of the 2025 Tour de France.

== Sights ==
In the town park, along the Dordogne, relics of the old Roman baths have been collected. The surrounding country, with its fir woods, pastures, waterfalls and mountains, is very attractive. To the south is the Puy de Sancy (1,886 m), the loftiest peak of central France.

== Gallery ==
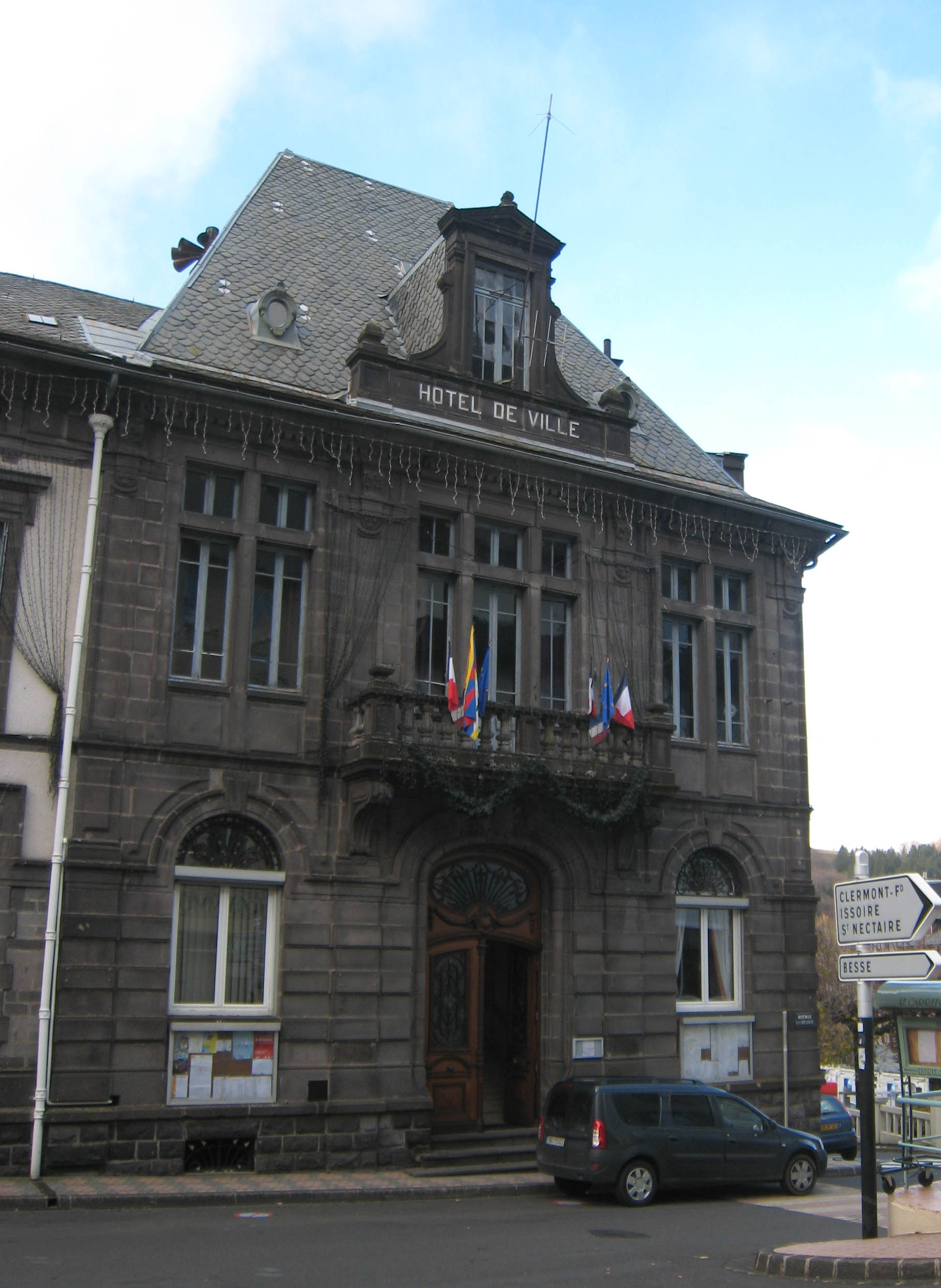
The Hôtel de Ville

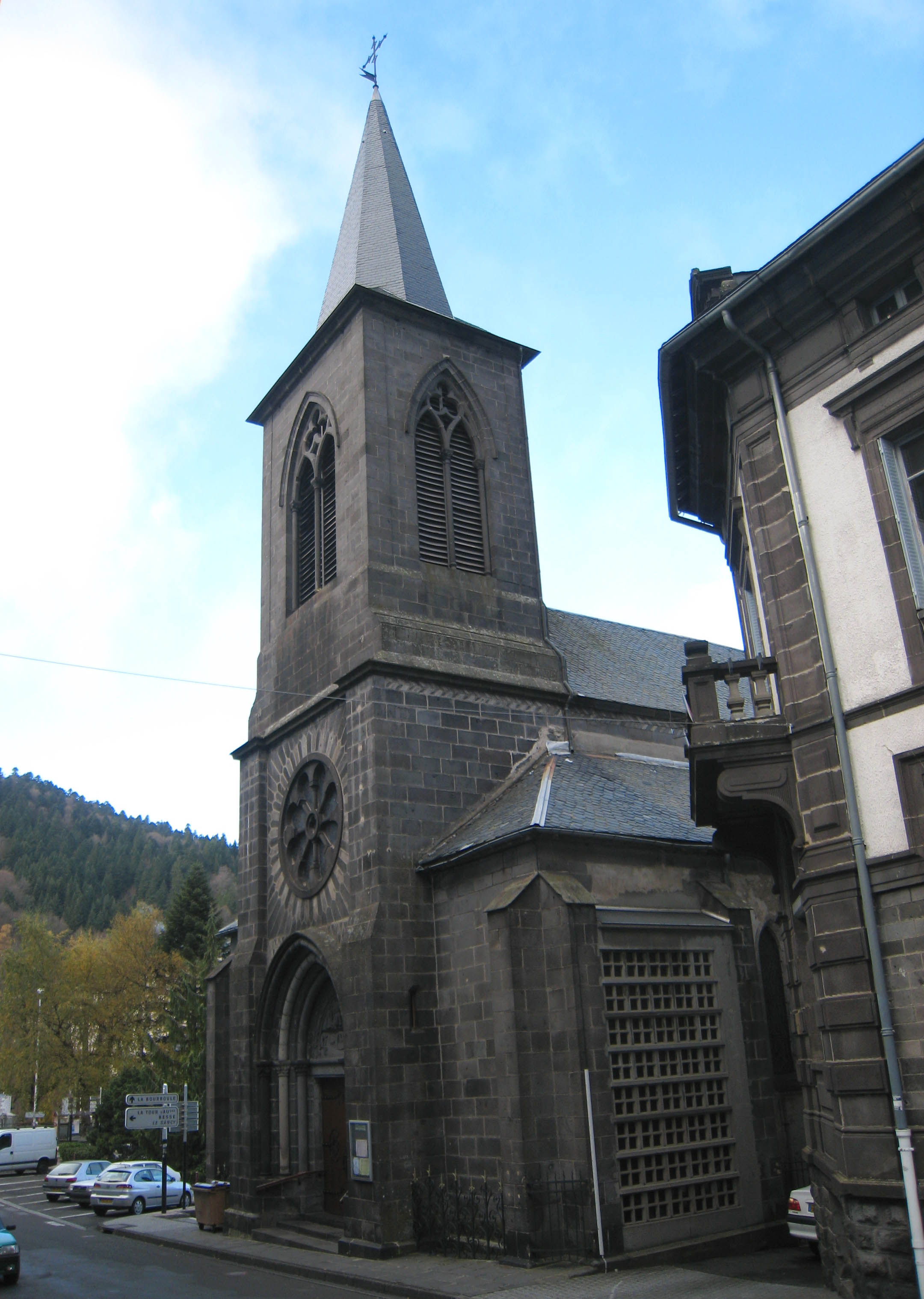
Church

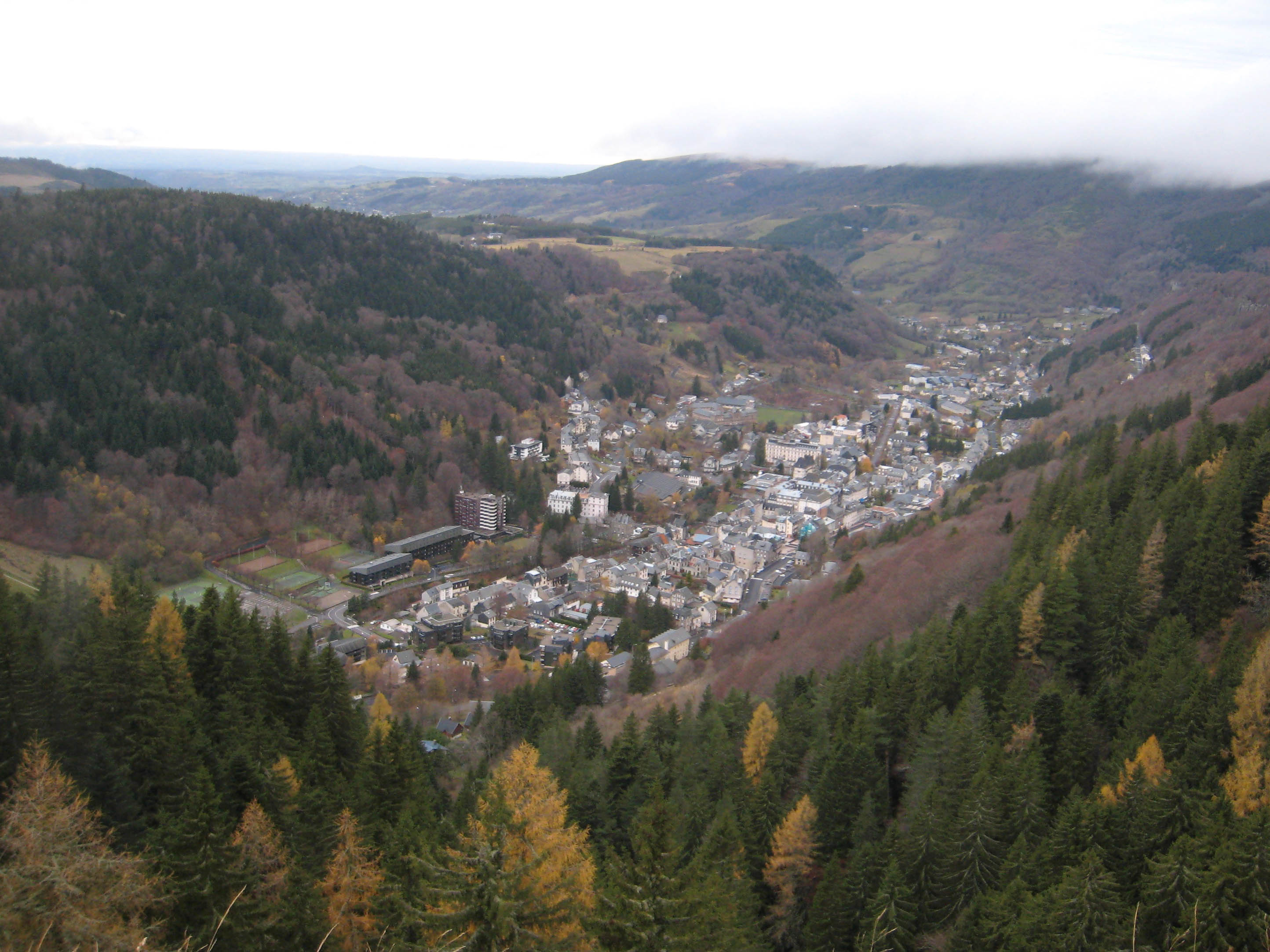
View from above the Grande Cascade

== See also ==
- Communes of the Puy-de-Dôme department
