= Maurice Palmade =

French politician (1886–1955)

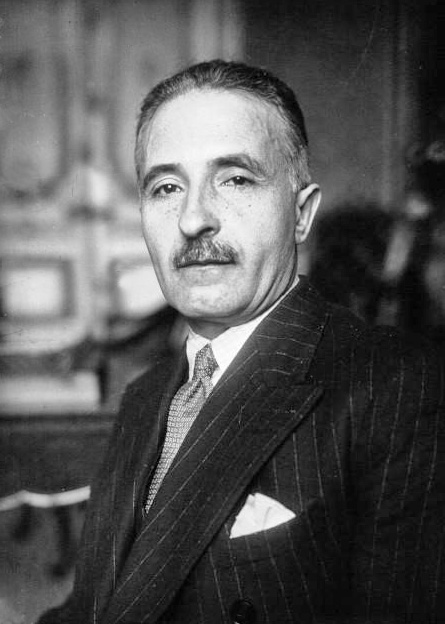
Maurice Palmade-1932.jpg

Maurice Palmade (6 October 1886 – 3 January 1955) was a French politician. He belonged to the Radical Party. Before World War II, he had been a member of parliament. He has been 3 times the budget minister of France.

== Biography ==
Palmade was born in Rochefort, Charente-Maritime on 6 October 1886. He served in World War I as a captain. He was the minister of budget between 1930 and 1932. On 10 July 1940, Palmade voted in favour of granting the cabinet presided by Marshal Philippe Pétain authority to draw up a new constitution, thereby effectively ending the French Third Republic and establishing Vichy France.

Palmade died in Bordeaux on 3 January 1955.
