= Serge Godard =

French politician

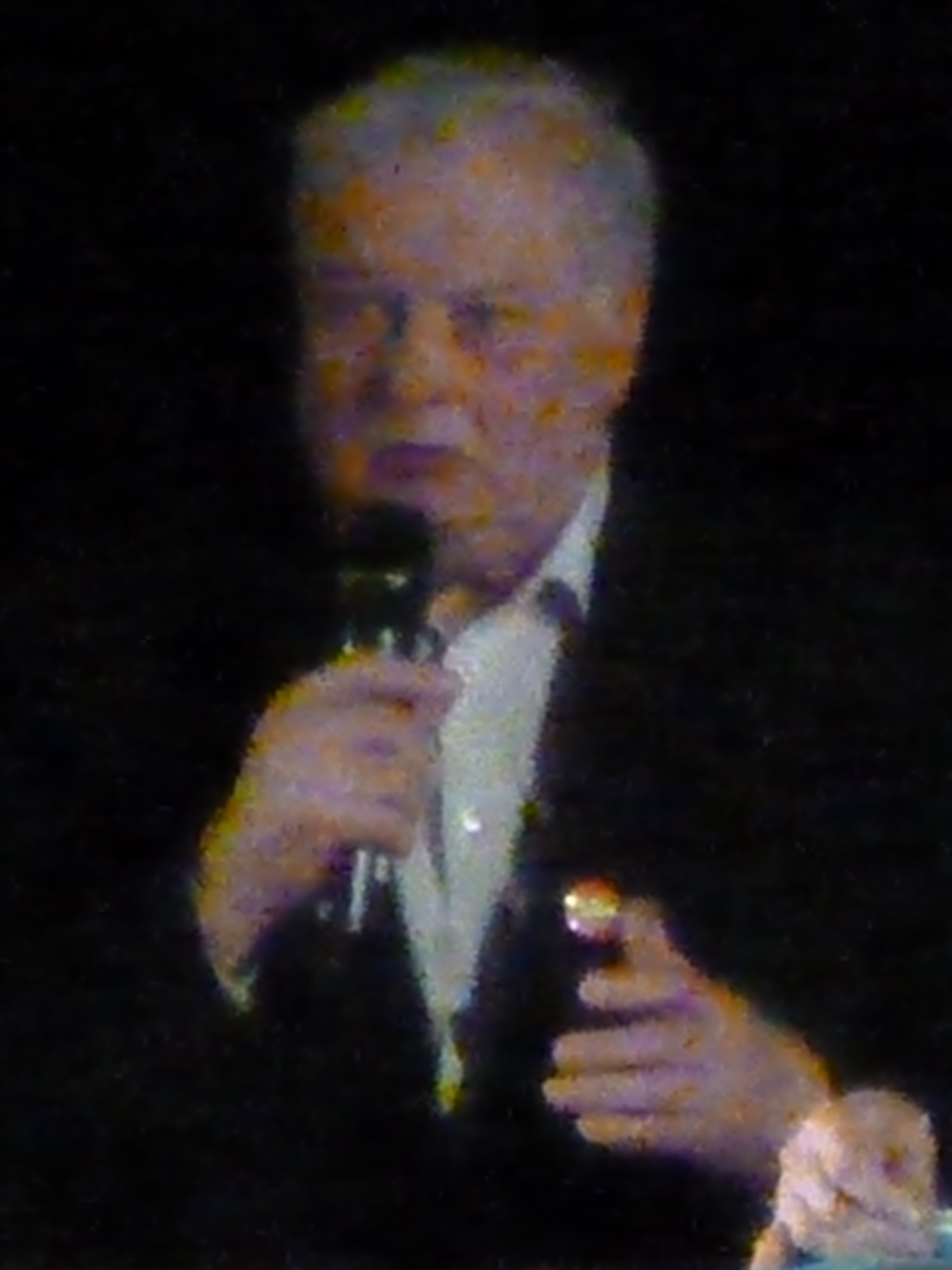
- Serge Godard at a political meeting supporting the PS mayoral candidate for Clermont-Ferrand, Olivier Bianchi. Clermont-Ferrand, March 20, 2014.

Mayor of Clermont-Ferrand
- In office 1997–2014
- Preceded by: Roger Quilliot
- Succeeded by: Olivier Bianchi

Personal details
- Born: 25 March 1936 (age 90) Gerzat, France
- Party: Socialist Party

Serge Godard (born 25 March 1936) is a French politician. He represented the French department of Puy-de-Dôme in the French Senate from September 1998 to September 2001 and again from March 2010 to September 2011.

Born in Gerzat, Puy-de-Dôme, he studied in Clermont-Ferrand, Sedan, Lille then Paris and in 1966, he received the diploma of physics doctorate. Between 1971 and 1976, he was the headmaster of "observatoire de physique" in Clermont-Ferrand and become a professor in Blaise Pascal University until 1996.

When Godard was eight, his mother Simone was sent to the Ravensbrück concentration camp.

From 4 July 1997 to 22 April 2014, he was the mayor of Clermont-Ferrand, succeeding Roger Quilliot and preceding Olivier Bianchi.

Godard was defeated when he ran for reelection to the Senate in 2001. He did not run for reelection in 2011. He was a member of the French Socialist Party.
