= Canton of Conty =

Coordinates: 49°44′29″N 2°9′9″E

Conty
- Former canton
- Interactive map of Conty
- Country: France
- Region: Hauts-de-France
- Department: Somme
- No. of communes: {{{nbcomm}}}
- Disbanded: 2015
- Area: 205.21 km^{2} (79.23 sq mi)
- Population (2012): 9,237
  - Density: 45.01/km^{2} (116.6/sq mi)

The Canton of Conty is a former canton situated in the department of the Somme and in the former Picardy region of northern France. It was disbanded following the French canton reorganisation which came into effect in March 2015. It consisted of 23 communes, which joined the canton of Ailly-sur-Noye in 2015. It had 9,237 inhabitants (2012).

== Geography ==
The canton is organised around the commune of Conty in the arrondissement of Amiens. The altitude varies from 36m at Bacouel-sur-Selle to 194m at Belleuse for an average of 83m.

The canton comprised 23 communes:

- Bacouel-sur-Selle
- Belleuse
- Bosquel
- Brassy
- Contre
- Conty
- Courcelles-sous-Thoix
- Essertaux
- Fleury
- Fossemanant
- Frémontiers
- Lœuilly
- Monsures
- Namps-Maisnil
- Nampty
- Neuville-lès-Lœuilly
- Oresmaux
- Plachy-Buyon
- Prouzel
- Sentelie
- Thoix
- Tilloy-lès-Conty
- Velennes

== Population ==
1962	1968	1975	1982	1990	1999
6617	7112	7026	7661	8266	8918
Census count starting from 1962 : Population without double counting

== See also ==
- Arrondissements of the Somme department
- Cantons of the Somme department
- Communes of the Somme department
