= Communauté de communes du Contynois =

Coordinates: 49.7396°N 2.1528°E

Contynois
- Former communauté de communes
- Interactive map of Contynois
- Country: France
- Region: Hauts-de-France
- Department: Somme
- No. of communes: {{{nbcomm}}}
- Established: 1996
- Disbanded: 2017
- Population (1999): 9,043

The Communauté de communes du Contynois (until 2015: Communauté de communes du canton de Conty) is a former communauté de communes in the Somme département and in the Picardie région of France. It was created in December 1996. It was merged into the new Communauté de communes Somme Sud-Ouest in January 2017.

The community is located in three valleys:

- The Valley of the Selle running north–south from Monsures to Bacouel-sur-Selle.
- The valley of the Evoissons river, running west from Frémontiers to Conty.
- The valley of the Parquets river, running southwest / northeast from Thoix to Fleury.

This rural area is easily accessible from junction 17 of the A16 motorway.

== Composition ==
This Communauté de communes comprised 23 communes:

1. Bacouel-sur-Selle
2. Belleuse
3. Bosquel
4. Brassy
5. Contre
6. Conty
7. Courcelles-sous-Thoix
8. Essertaux
9. Fleury
10. Fossemanant
11. Frémontiers
12. Lœuilly
13. Monsures
14. Namps-Maisnil
15. Nampty
16. Neuville-lès-Lœuilly
17. Oresmaux
18. Plachy-Buyon
19. Prouzel
20. Sentelie
21. Thoix
22. Tilloy-lès-Conty
23. Velennes

== Responsibilities ==
The communes delegate members to the communauté to be responsible for the following:

- The study, the creation and management of any area of economic activity, craft or commerce of more than 3 hectares.
- In the area of assistance for businesses: construction, maintenance and management of workshops, factories and tree nurseries.
- The creation and management of the holiday homes.
- The management of the Tourist office.
- The maintenance of hiking trails with a grant from the General Council of the Somme;
- The recording of land for economic development and housing.
- Sanitation: As such it provides control systems for sewerage systems, technical assistance to owners creating or upgrading their installation standards, the development of tools to facilitate maintenance of facilities.
- The construction and acquisition of housing for rent.
- All minor roads, tracks and pathway maintenance.
- Maintenance of the verges along the roads of the community as well as the department, following an agreement with the General Council of the Somme;
- Assure mowing, pruning and snow removal on roads, in conjunction with the General Council of the Somme;
- Maintenance of the Claude Jeunemaître gymnasium (adjacent to Conty college);
- The construction and management of any new equipment over €100,000
- The provision of technical and financial support to associations or clubs of the community defined as having half its members from communes of the communauté;
- It provides entertainment programming of community interest,
- Service and household services provider;
- Attendance at the Maison de l'Emploi, or any other equivalent structure.
- Organization and management of the recreation centres.
- Provision of equipment for groups in leisure centres during the school summer holidays;
- Organization and management of public nurseries.
- The communauté may also provide financial assistance for the canton associations working in any of these fields.

=== Budget ===
The budget of the community is financed by additional taxes levied by the individual communes.

== Work and Projects ==
The communauté has developed an economic hub at Essertaux and a warehouse for the packaging and selling of fresh potatoes and has completed the extension of the gymnasium at Conty.
It actively promotes helping the elderly, maintains 140 km of roads within the communauté and has created a refuse disposal & recycling site at Lœuilly.

It has provided:

- The establishment of an industrial zone near junction 17 of the A16 autoroute.
- Sports facilities, including a sports hall at Plachy-Buyon and improved existing facilities for users (including many schoolchildren) with the construction of locker rooms and sanitation at the sailing club at Lœuilly.
- The creation of a holiday village and preservation of the ecological riches of the three valleys that make up the communauté's territory
- Building a visitors’ centre at the Conty marshes.

The Communauté also finances the Tourist Office of the Valley of the Selle.

== See also ==
- Communes of the Somme department
