= Tilloy =

Tilloy may refer to:

- Tilloy-et-Bellay, commune in the Marne department in northeastern France
- Tilloy-Floriville, commune in the Somme département in the Picardie region of France
- Tilloy-lès-Conty, commune in the Somme département in the Picardie region of France
- Tilloy-lès-Hermaville, commune in the Pas-de-Calais department in the Nord-Pas-de-Calais region of France
- Tilloy-lès-Mofflaines, commune in the Pas-de-Calais department in the Nord-Pas-de-Calais region of France
- Tilloy-lez-Cambrai, commune in the Nord department in northern France
- Tilloy-lez-Marchiennes, commune in the Nord department in northern France
