= Arvillers =

- Commune
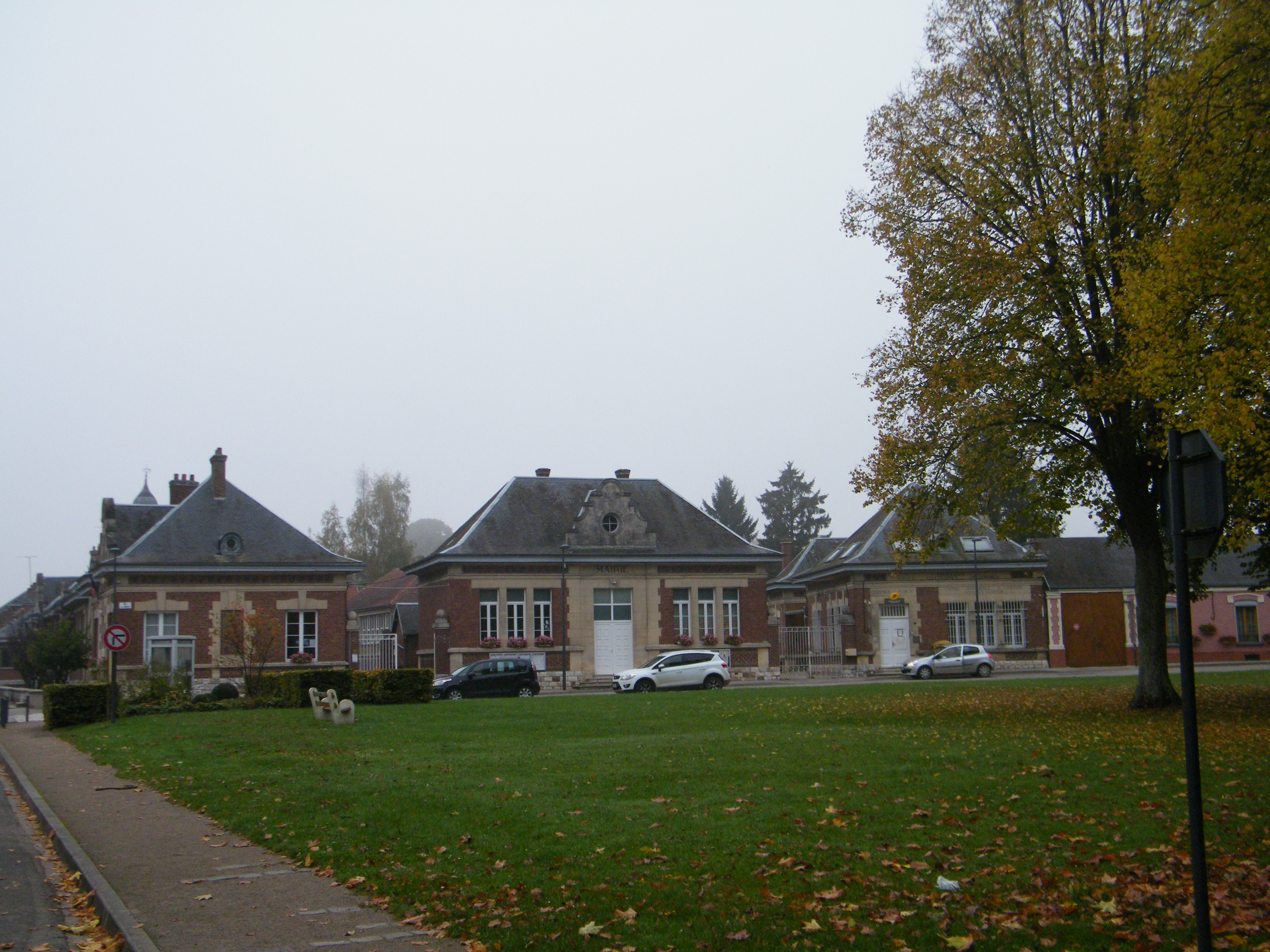
- The town hall and school in Arvillers
- Location of Arvillers
- Location within France Location within Hauts-de-France
- Coordinates: 49°44′44″N 2°38′52″E
- Country: France
- Region: Hauts-de-France
- Department: Somme
- Arrondissement: Montdidier
- Canton: Moreuil
- Intercommunality: CC Avre Luce Noye

Government
  - Mayor (2020–2026): Yves Cottard
- Area^{1}: 12.68 km^{2} (4.90 sq mi)
- Elevation: 102 m (335 ft)
- Highest elevation: 108 m (354 ft)
- Lowest elevation: 49 m (161 ft)
- Population (2023): 759
  - Density: 59.9/km^{2} (155/sq mi)
- Time zone: UTC+01:00 (CET)
  - Summer (DST): UTC+02:00 (CEST)
- INSEE/Postal code: 80031 /80910
- ^{1} French Land Register data, which excludes lakes, ponds, glaciers > 1 km^{2} (0.386 sq mi or 247 acres) and river estuaries.

Arvillers is a commune in the Somme department in Hauts-de-France in northern France. In February 1965, it absorbed the former commune Saulchoy-sur-Davesnescourt.

== See also ==
- Communes of the Somme department
- Raymond Couvègnes
