= Raymond Couvègnes =

French sculptor and medallist

- Born: 27 February 1893; Ermont, France
- Died: 18 December 1985 (aged 92); Paris, France
- Occupations: Sculptor and medallist

Raymond Couvègnes (French: [ʁɛmɔ̃ kuvɛɲ]; 27 February 1893 in Ermont – 15 December 1985 in Paris) was a French sculptor and medallist.

His father was Emile Couvègnes, a director of the "Compagnie des chemin de fer du Nord" and a military historian. He showed an early talent for design and attended the École d'arts appliqués Bernard Palissy before enrolling at the École nationale supérieure des Beaux-Arts. He studied under Injalbert and in 1927 won the Prix de Rome for sculpture. His early works involved sculptural work which arose in the reconstruction of churches and town halls in Northern France where so much damaged had been sustained in the 1914–1918 war. Examples of such work involved Montdidier town hall and churches in Roye, Arvillers, Moreuil, Le Bosquel and Athies. For the most part he worked using moulded concrete (béton moulé). In his next phase his works were executed in limestone or stone including in Paris a bust of Pierre Curie for the Palais de la Découverte, the statue of Claude Bernard in front of the collège de France and of Queen Astrid for Paris' Cité universitaire and the work "La Femme au bain" in the Parc de la Butte du Chapeau Rouge. Outside of Paris, Couvègnes worked on a bust and bas-relief of Raymond Poincaré in Bar-le-Duc, a bust of Franklin D. Roosevelt in Cesnay, a memorial to the efforts of the French resistance in Neuvic and in Amboise a monument dedicated to the liberators of France. To this we can add a striking decoration to Lille's "La voix du Nord" building, decoration to the old chamber of commerce in Poitiers and to the Boulogne-Billancourt Hôtel de Ville and outside France he created a bust of Mauritius' pioneer in cane sugar and a "Chemin de Croix" (Stations of the Cross) for a convent in Alexandria. He created escutcheons for factories in the Rhin and for educational establishments in Ermont, Boulogne, Franconville, Poitiers, St-Cyr, Coëtquidam and Sannois. Also between 1956 and 1973 he worked for EDF on sculptural decoration for their nuclear and hydroelectric power stations. He set up the École des Beaux-Arts de Boulogne-Billancourt where he lived and taught there for many years.

== Works ==
=== Early works ===
"Le Rémouleur"

In 1920 Couvègnes submitted a design drawing for that year's Prix Bridan run by the Ecole Nationale des Beaux-Arts and they hold a copy in their records. It appears he was awarded the second prize. This is perhaps the earliest insight into Couvègnes abilities.

"Faune Borghèse"

This design drawing by Couvègnes dates to 1921 and was his submission for that year's Prix Bridan.

"La jeunesse et les Parques"

With this composition Couvègnes won the 1925 Prix Doublemard.

"Décision"

This was Couvègnes' submission for the 1926 competition "Tête d'expression" organised each year by the Beaux-arts de Paris.

"L'invention de la corne d'abondance"

This bas-relief in plaster won Couvègnes the 1927 Prix de Rome for sculpture. It is held in the collection of the Ếcole Nationale Supérieure des Beaux-Arts who hold works of ex pupils.

=== Works in churches ===
Église paroissiale Saint-Jean-l'Evangéliste

Couvègnes worked on the decoration to the altar and a tabernacle in this Cachan church.

Eglise Saint-Vast

In 1929, Couvegnes executed sculptural work for the Saint-Vast façade. The church is in Moreuil. The church had suffered damage in the 1914–1918 war, and the architects Charles Duval and Emmanuel Gonse were commissioned to restore the church. Reinforced cement was used in the reconstruction. Apart from Couvegnes' sculptures the church has paintings by Henri Marret, and mosaics by Jean Gaudin. André Rinuy and Jean Hébert-Stevens had executed the stained glass windows. These were destroyed in 1940 and replaced after the war.

Le Bosquel Parish Church

In June 1940, the village was almost totally destroyed during the German invasion. The church had to be completely rebuilt and includes works by Couvègnes.

Arvillers Parish Church

Another town ravaged by war in 1914–1918 where the church needed reconstruction and another instance of Charles Duval and Emmanuel Gonse carrying out the design and using reinforced concrete. The Église Saint-Martin was a 17th-century church. Couvègnes executed the new typanum over the church entrance. In 1929 the painter Henri Marret carried out a remarkable "Chemin de croix (Stations of the Cross).

Athies Parish Church

Athies' Église Notre Dame de l'Assomption dates to the 12th Century and was classified as a "monument historique" in 1862. The church was badly damaged in the 1914–1918 war although the 13th Century tympanum depicting the nativity and the flight to Egypt was saved. After the war Raymond Couvègnes took part in the restoration and was responsible for several statues and some decoration to the altar. The church has some remarkable stained glass and other glasswork by Jean Gaudin.

Église Saint-Pierre de Roye

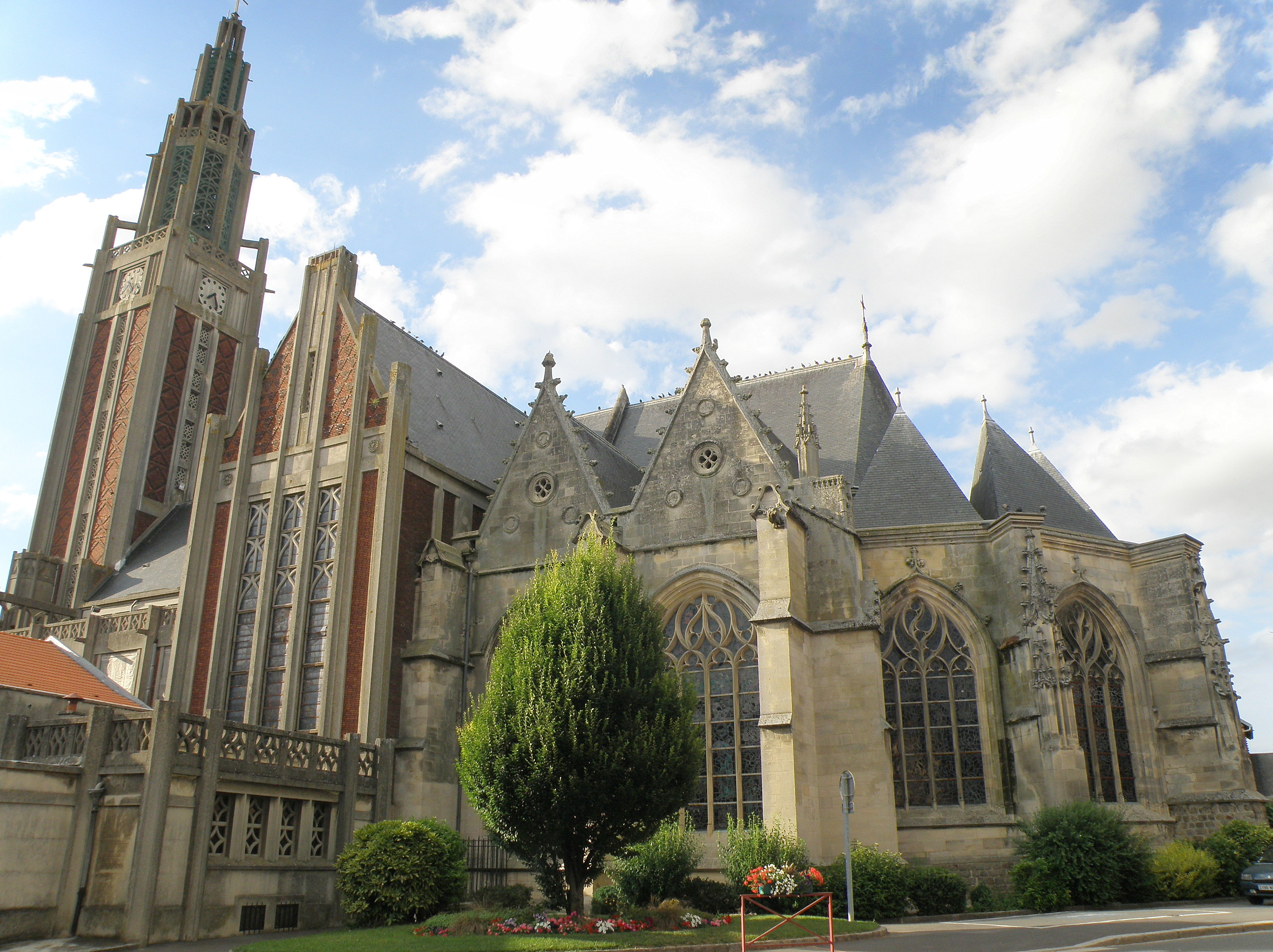
View of Roye's Église Saint-Pierre showing part rebuilt in reinforced concrete

Raymond Couvègnes was a pioneer in the use of moulded reinforced concrete ("béton moulé") and this medium was used for some of the church's decoration. Much of the area of Picardy was on the front line in the 1914–1918 war and, as a consequence, suffered from destruction from artillery and other fire. Roye was no exception and the Renaissance church of Saint-Pierre, classified as a "monument historique" in 1908, suffered considerable damage. The reconstruction of the Roye church was put in the hands of the Paris architects Charles Duval and Emmanuel Gonse and althoqugh they were able to restore the choir area to its original "flamboyant" style, much of the remainder of the building had to be completely rebuilt and, in the interests of economy, much use was made of reinforced concrete. This was very much in vogue and had been developed as a building material by the Perret brothers. Visitors to Amien will recall the Perret tower. In the attached photograph we can see the contrasting styles and the parts rebuilt in concrete. These two architects had used Raymond Couvègnes when rebuilding the Montdidier Hôtel de ville (town hall) and for the Roye church they commissioned him to execute several sculptural works in the church's interior.

Église Saint-Louis de la cité Nouméa des mines de Drocourt

Couvègnes completed two tympani for this church in Rouvroy. One of these is shown below.

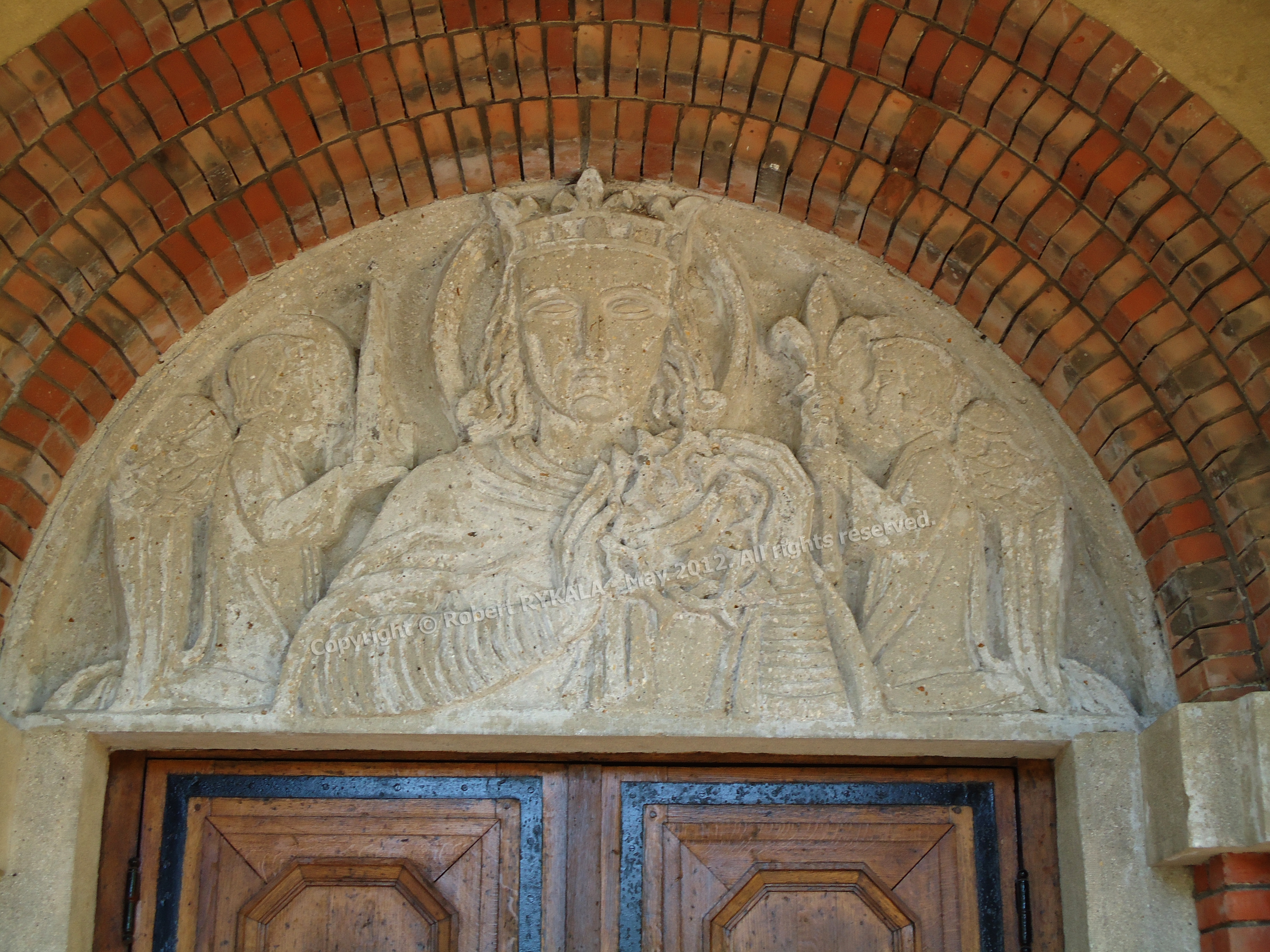

=== Other works ===
Tête de jeune fille, Lycée Victor Hugo

There had been a fountain in Poitiers lycée Victor- Hugo which featured this 1933 sculpture by Couvègnes which had been dismantled. In 2004 it was restored to the lycée.

"Bergère"

This composition dates to around 1954 and is to be seen in the Meymac Mairie.

The Biermans Lapôtre Foundation building

The Cité Universitaire of Paris is located near the Porte d'Orléans. The university comprises various buildings or halls of residence each built in the architectural style of various countries. Thus there is a Spanish house, an Italian house, etc.etc. The Biermans Lapôtre Foundation building represents Belgium and has both Flemish and Walloon features. There is also a statue of Queen Astrid in the main hall, this by Couvegnes. Frescoes representing Brussels, Antwerp, Liege and Namur are exhibited in the same room.

"Le cep"

This sculpture is to be seen in the Mairie of Rosny-sous-Bois,

Lille. Bronze allegory for the Voix du Nord building

As decoration for the Voix du Nord building in Lille Couvegnes produced a sculpture depicting allegories for Flanders, Hainaut and Artois. The original plaster work can be seen in Roubaix.

Bust of Raymond Poincaré

This bust can be seen in the Bar-le-Duc Mairie.

Plaque in front of Boulogne-Billancourt Town Hall

Couvegnes' "Boulogne-Billancourt, commune d'Europe" dates to 1955. It celebrates the early days of the European Union.

Bas-relief of Raymond Poincaré

This work by Couvègnes dates to 1950 and decorates the Lycée Raymond Poincaré in Bar-le-Duc. Poincaré was the French president from 1913 to 1920 and had been a student at the Bar-le-Lycée from 1867 to 1876.

Bas-relief for building at 3 avenue Paul Monmoine in Matha in Charente-Maritime

This Art Déco building was built in the 1930s for Lucien Durand and became the "Maison Familiale Rurale de Matha" in the 1950s. In 1936, Couvègnes created a bas-relief near the building's entrance which depicted two women kneeling in front a child who is learning to walk.

Statue of Claude Bernard

The Collège de France dates back to 1530 when it was founded as the "Collège Royal" and in front of the college is a statue of Claude Bernard. The original bronze by Eugène Guillaume had been requisitioned by the Germans in 1941 and melted down in order to reuse the metal, a not uncommon practice, and in 1946 a replacement in stone was executed by Couvègnes.

"Femme au bain"

At the prestigious 1937 Exposition internationale des arts et techniques dans la vie moderne, Couvègnes exhibited various sculptures under the title "Paris et les arts" including a composition entitled "Eve" or "Femme au bain", these for part of the exhibition called "Porte de Paris". Today this work can be seen in the " La Butte du Chapeau Rouge" in Paris

Neuvic, monument aux Résistants de corrèze

The "Monument du puy Chaffaud" in Neuvic is dedicated to the French Resistance and the effiorts of the Maqui. It depicts a member of the resistance emerging from a wood and armed with a grenade. It was inaugurated on the 18 September 1949. Neuvicakso has a museum dedicated to the Resistance. The monument also known as the "Monument commémoratif Résistants et Maquisards" is located in the Neuvic cemetery.

Montdidier Hôtel de Ville

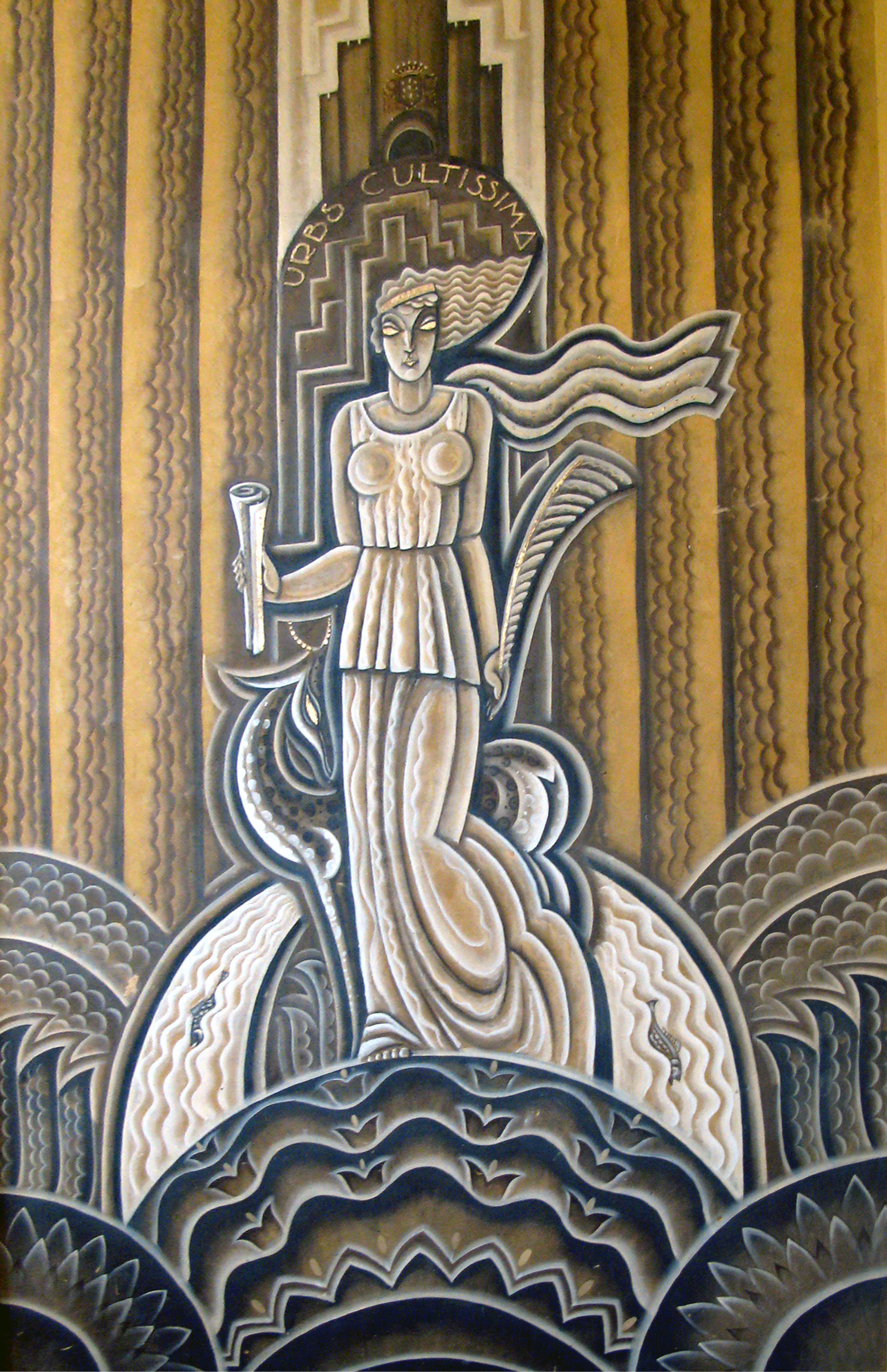
Maurice Pico painting inside Montdidier town hall

The Paris architects Charles Duval and Emmanuel Gonse took charge of the reconstruction of the town hall in 1927; it had been almost totally destroyed in 1918. They rebuilt it in the original "Flemish" style but using bricks and concrete and much of the interior decoration was carried out in the "Art deco" style. The exterior of the building was decorated with Montdidier's motto "Urbs cultissima", the arms of the town and reproductions of the Légion d'Honneur and la Croix de Guerre. On the façade they commissioned Couvègnes to execute bas-reliefs depicting "les techniques", "les arts", "L'évolution du progrès" and the riches of the Santerre region whilst Maurice Pico was commissioned to execute some paintings. Couvègnes also executed a Marianne for the interior and sculpted the head of a child for the keystone (clé de voûte).

For the bas-relief covering "les techniques" Couvègnes depicted various scientific instruments, for "L'évolution du progrès" he made references to iron and electricity whilst the Santerre was represented by a horn of plenty, a tipstaff and sheaf of wheat celebrating her rich agriculture. Beneath are four heads depicting gods and goddesses including Hermes with his winged helmet,

Poitiers Chamber of Commerce

Couvègnes executed a sculpture in cement for the pediment of this Poitiers building once serving as the Chamber of Commerce. The sculpture depicts Mercury, Ceres and Flora.

Fessenheim Nuclear Power Plant

The nuclear station at Fessenheim in Haut-Rhin was inaugurated by President Rene Coty on 8 Jul 1957. Couvègnes created a cement relief on the station's facade entitled "Le dieu du Rhin ".

"Femme nageant"

This plaster high-relief, termed a "figure colossale", is located in Boulogne-Billancourt's hôtel de ville.
