= Athies, Somme =

Athies
- Commune
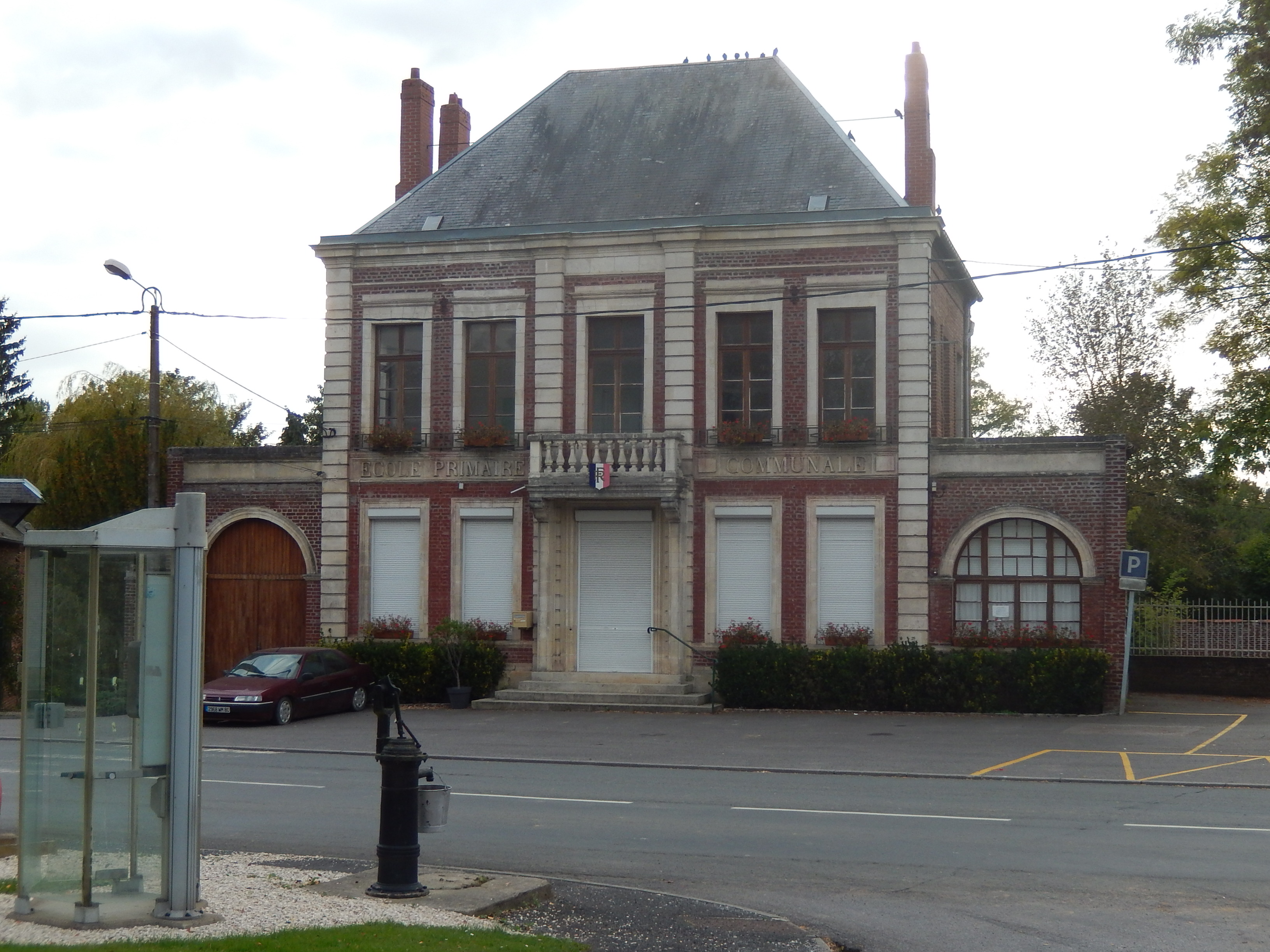
- The town hall of Athies

- Coat of arms
- Location of Athies
- Location within France Location within Hauts-de-France
- Coordinates: 49°51′20″N 2°58′46″E
- Country: France
- Region: Hauts-de-France
- Department: Somme
- Arrondissement: Péronne
- Canton: Ham
- Intercommunality: CC Est Somme

Government
  - Mayor (2020–2026): Alain Acquaire
- Area^{1}: 10.67 km^{2} (4.12 sq mi)
- Elevation: 78 m (256 ft)
- Highest elevation: 88 m (289 ft)
- Lowest elevation: 47 m (154 ft)
- Population (2023): 614
  - Density: 57.5/km^{2} (149/sq mi)
- Time zone: UTC+01:00 (CET)
  - Summer (DST): UTC+02:00 (CEST)
- INSEE/Postal code: 80034 /80200
- ^{1} French Land Register data, which excludes lakes, ponds, glaciers > 1 km^{2} (0.386 sq mi or 247 acres) and river estuaries.

Athies (French pronunciation: [ati]) is a commune in the Somme department in Hauts-de-France in northern France.

== See also ==
- Communes of the Somme department
- Raymond Couvègnes
