= Ô-de-Selle =

- Commune
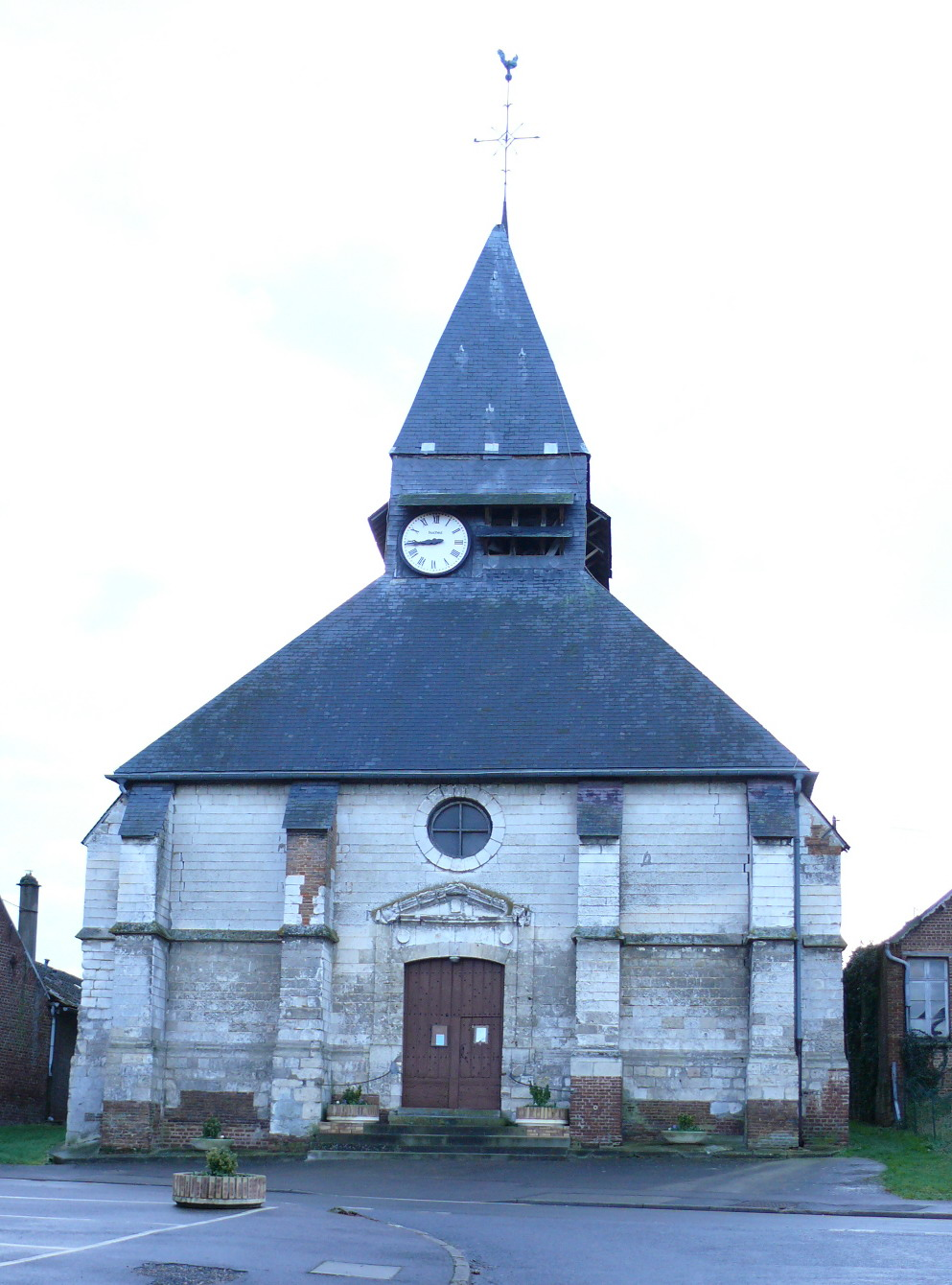
- The church in Lœuilly
- Location of Ô-de-Selle
- Location within France Location within Hauts-de-France
- Coordinates: 49°46′36″N 2°10′34″E
- Country: France
- Region: Hauts-de-France
- Department: Somme
- Arrondissement: Amiens
- Canton: Ailly-sur-Noye
- Intercommunality: CC Somme Sud-Ouest

Government
  - Mayor (2021–2026): Valérie Mouton
- Area^{1}: 26.72 km^{2} (10.32 sq mi)
- Highest elevation: 152 m (499 ft)
- Lowest elevation: 42 m (138 ft)
- Population (2023): 1,148
  - Density: 42.96/km^{2} (111.3/sq mi)
- Time zone: UTC+01:00 (CET)
  - Summer (DST): UTC+02:00 (CEST)
- INSEE/Postal code: 80485 /80160
- ^{1} French Land Register data, which excludes lakes, ponds, glaciers > 1 km^{2} (0.386 sq mi or 247 acres) and river estuaries.

Ô-de-Selle (French pronunciation: [o də sɛl]) is a commune in the Somme department in Hauts-de-France in northern France. It was established on 1 January 2019 by merger of the former communes of Lœuilly (the seat), Neuville-lès-Lœuilly and Tilloy-lès-Conty.

== See also ==
- Communes of the Somme department
