= Neuville-lès-Lœuilly =

- Part of Ô-de-Selle
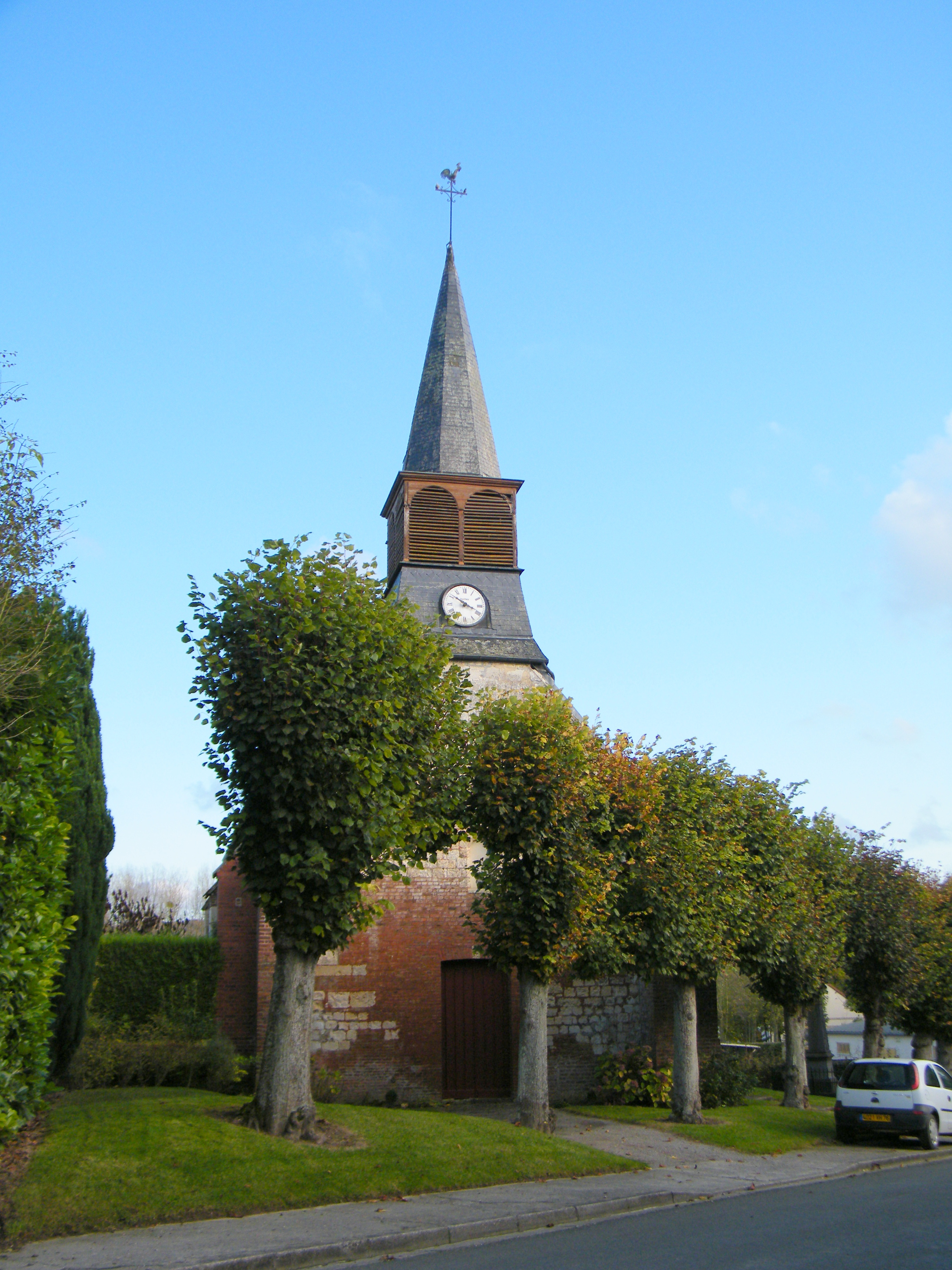
- The church in Neuville-lès-Lœuilly
- Location of Neuville-lès-Lœuilly
- Location within France Location within Hauts-de-France
- Coordinates: 49°47′30″N 2°11′03″E
- Country: France
- Region: Hauts-de-France
- Department: Somme
- Arrondissement: Amiens
- Canton: Ailly-sur-Noye
- Commune: Ô-de-Selle
- Area^{1}: 3.17 km^{2} (1.22 sq mi)
- Elevation: 45 m (148 ft)
- Highest elevation: 134 m (440 ft)
- Lowest elevation: 42 m (138 ft)
- Population (2022): 108
  - Density: 34.1/km^{2} (88.2/sq mi)
- Time zone: UTC+01:00 (CET)
  - Summer (DST): UTC+02:00 (CEST)
- Postal code: 80160
- ^{1} French Land Register data, which excludes lakes, ponds, glaciers > 1 km^{2} (0.386 sq mi or 247 acres) and river estuaries.

Neuville-lès-Lœuilly (French pronunciation: [nøvil lɛ lœji], literally Neuville near Lœuilly) is a former commune in the Somme department in Hauts-de-France in northern France. On 1 January 2019, it was merged into the new commune Ô-de-Selle.

== Geography ==
The commune is situated on the D61 road, some 7 miles (11 km) southwest of Amiens, on the banks of the river Selle.

== Population ==
Historical population
Year	Pop.	±% p.a.
1962	75	—
1968	75	+0.00%
1975	91	+2.80%
1982	105	+2.07%
1990	104	−0.12%
1999	102	−0.22%
2006	108	+0.82%
Source: EHESS

== See also ==
- Communes of the Somme department
