= Courcelles-sous-Thoix =

- Commune
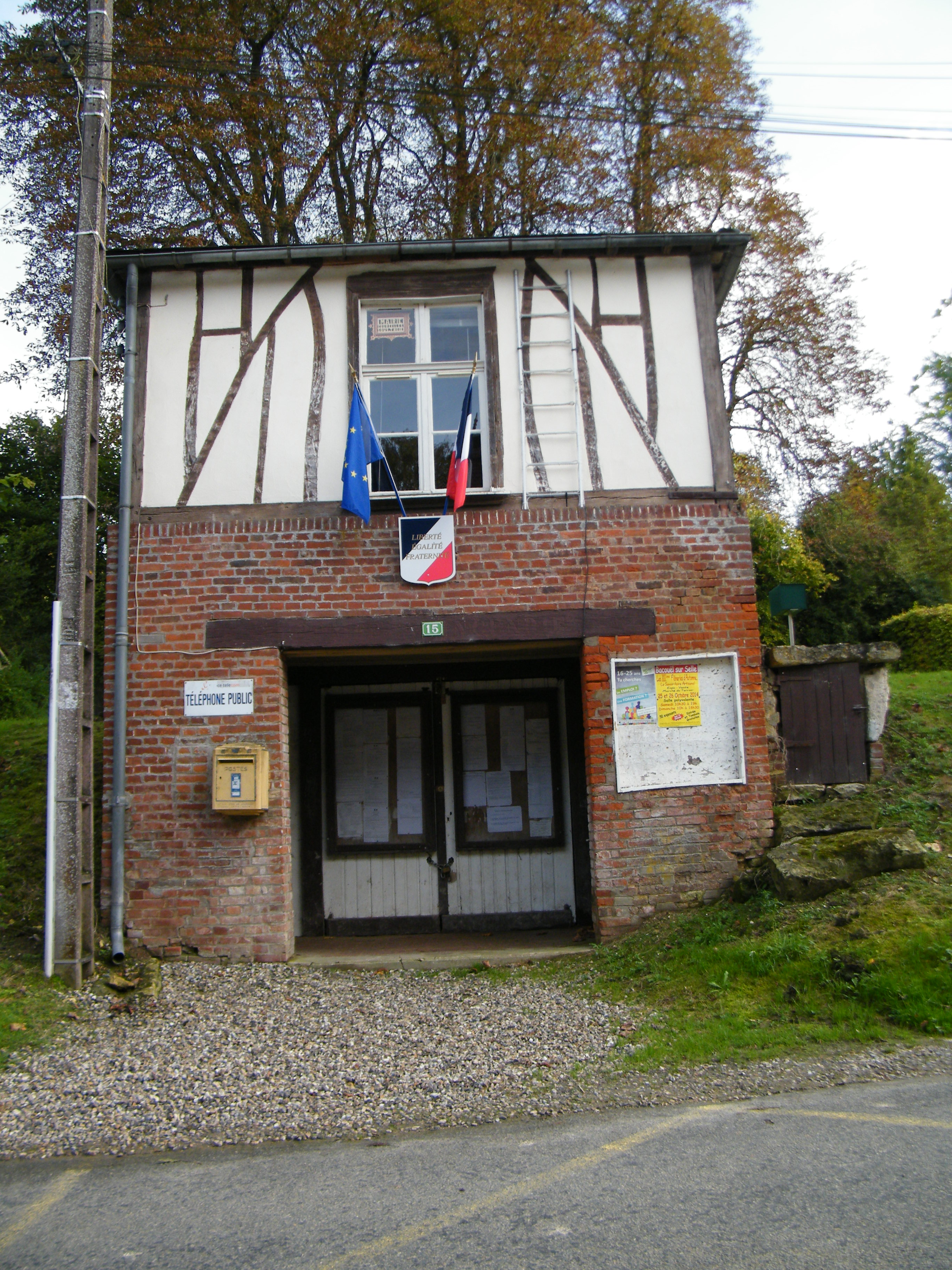
- The town hall in Courcelles-sous-Thoix
- Location of Courcelles-sous-Thoix
- Location within France Location within Hauts-de-France
- Coordinates: 49°43′23″N 2°04′48″E
- Country: France
- Region: Hauts-de-France
- Department: Somme
- Arrondissement: Amiens
- Canton: Ailly-sur-Noye
- Intercommunality: CC Somme Sud-Ouest

Government
  - Mayor (2020–2026): Arnaud de Monclin
- Area^{1}: 4.37 km^{2} (1.69 sq mi)
- Elevation: 88 m (289 ft)
- Highest elevation: 187 m (614 ft)
- Lowest elevation: 72 m (236 ft)
- Population (2023): 65
  - Density: 15/km^{2} (39/sq mi)
- Time zone: UTC+01:00 (CET)
  - Summer (DST): UTC+02:00 (CEST)
- INSEE/Postal code: 80219 /80160
- ^{1} French Land Register data, which excludes lakes, ponds, glaciers > 1 km^{2} (0.386 sq mi or 247 acres) and river estuaries.

Courcelles-sous-Thoix (French pronunciation: [kuʁsɛl su twa], literally Courcelles under Thoix; Picard: Courchelle-dsous-Thoé) is a commune in the Somme department in Hauts-de-France in northern France.

== Geography ==
The commune is situated on the D100 road, some 16 miles (26 km) southwest of Amiens.

== Places of interest ==
- The château des Alleux, in Louis XIII style. Now a hotel.

== Population ==
Historical population
Year	Pop.	±% p.a.
1968	73	—
1975	58	−3.23%
1982	55	−0.76%
1990	54	−0.23%
1999	55	+0.20%
2007	59	+0.88%
2012	48	−4.04%
2017	69	+7.53%
2023	65	−0.99%
Source: INSEE

== See also ==
- Communes of the Somme department
