= Velennes, Somme =

Velennes
- Commune
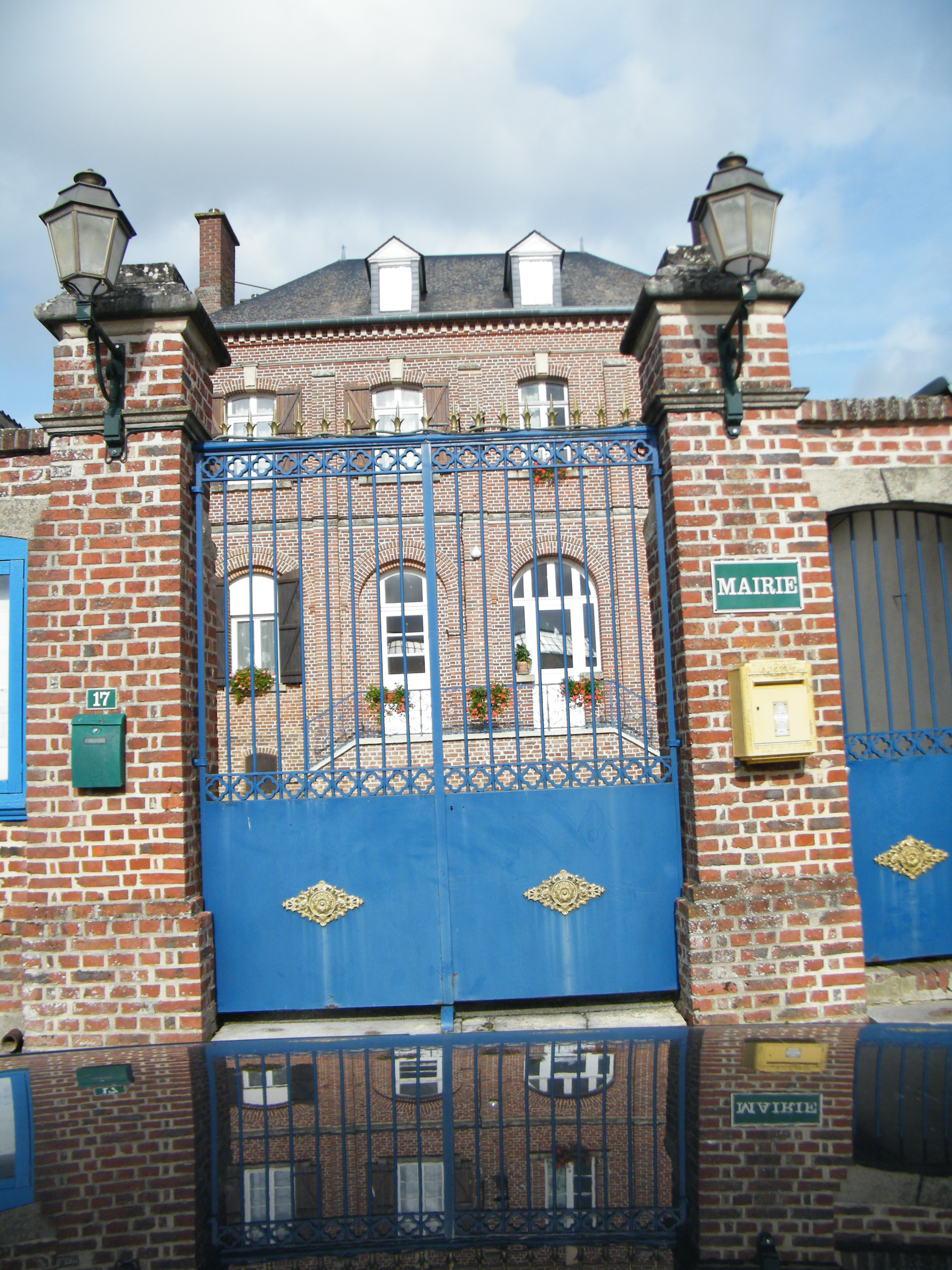
- The town hall in Velennes
- Location of Velennes
- Location within France Location within Hauts-de-France
- Coordinates: 49°45′50″N 2°05′41″E
- Country: France
- Region: Hauts-de-France
- Department: Somme
- Arrondissement: Amiens
- Canton: Ailly-sur-Noye
- Intercommunality: CC Somme Sud-Ouest

Government
  - Mayor (2020–2026): Nicolas Bourgois
- Area^{1}: 3.96 km^{2} (1.53 sq mi)
- Elevation: 160 m (520 ft)
- Highest elevation: 164 m (538 ft)
- Lowest elevation: 66 m (217 ft)
- Population (2023): 141
  - Density: 35.6/km^{2} (92.2/sq mi)
- Time zone: UTC+01:00 (CET)
  - Summer (DST): UTC+02:00 (CEST)
- INSEE/Postal code: 80786 /80160
- ^{1} French Land Register data, which excludes lakes, ponds, glaciers > 1 km^{2} (0.386 sq mi or 247 acres) and river estuaries.

Velennes is a commune in the Somme department in Hauts-de-France in northern France.

== Geography ==
Velennes is situated 12 miles (19 km) southwest of Amiens, on the D245 road

== Population ==
Historical population
Year	Pop.	±% p.a.
1968	131	—
1975	125	−0.67%
1982	107	−2.20%
1990	116	+1.01%
1999	127	+1.01%
2007	154	+2.44%
2012	146	−1.06%
2017	149	+0.41%
2023	141	−0.92%
Source: INSEE

== See also ==
- Communes of the Somme department
