= Bosquel =

- Commune
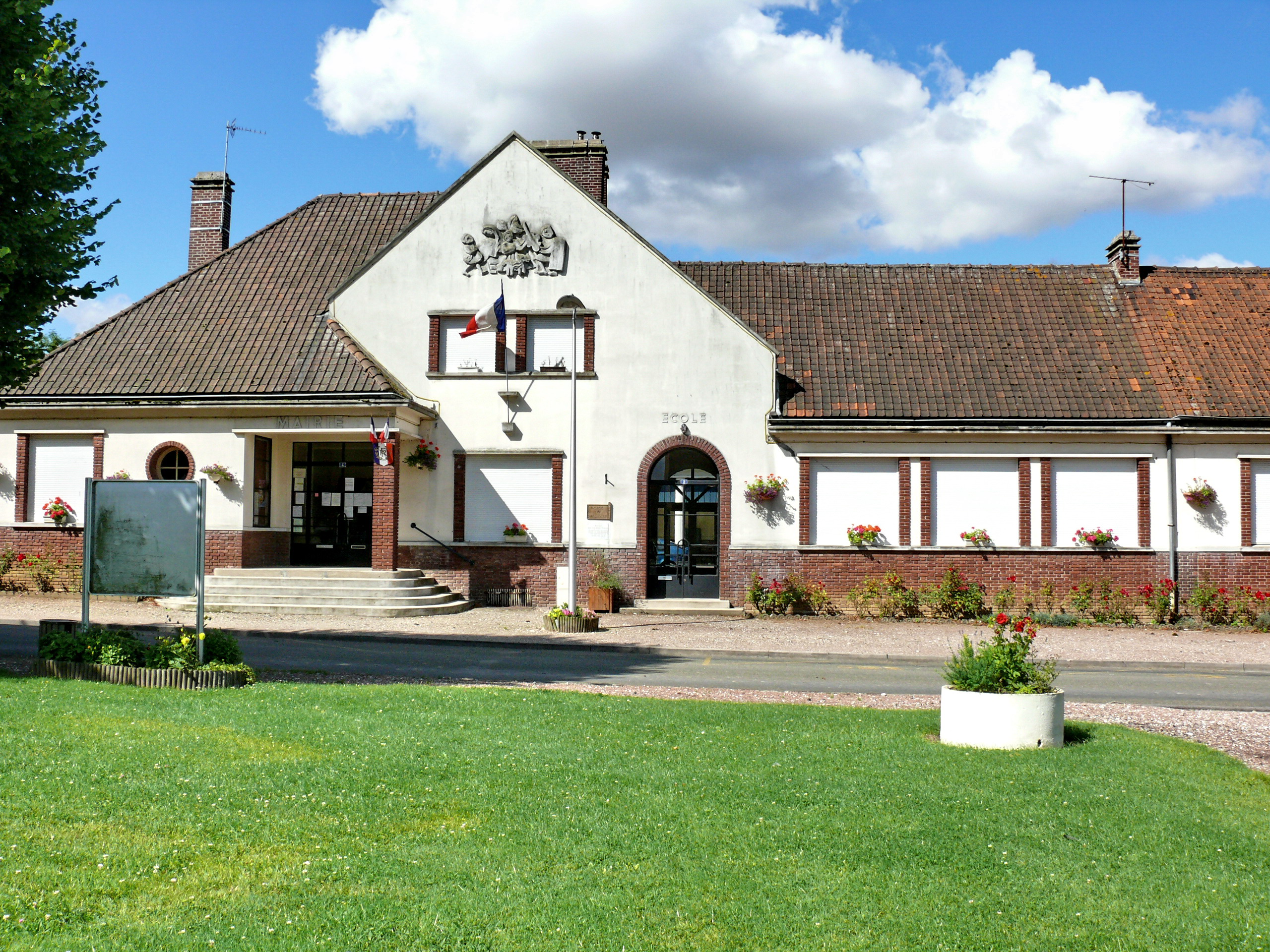
- The town hall and school of Le Bosquel
- Location of Bosquel
- Location within France Location within Hauts-de-France
- Coordinates: 49°44′23″N 2°13′45″E
- Country: France
- Region: Hauts-de-France
- Department: Somme
- Arrondissement: Amiens
- Canton: Ailly-sur-Noye
- Intercommunality: CC Somme Sud-Ouest

Government
  - Mayor (2020–2026): Gérard Glorieux
- Area^{1}: 9.48 km^{2} (3.66 sq mi)
- Elevation: 137 m (449 ft)
- Highest elevation: 157 m (515 ft)
- Lowest elevation: 74 m (243 ft)
- Population (2023): 349
  - Density: 36.8/km^{2} (95.3/sq mi)
- Time zone: UTC+01:00 (CET)
  - Summer (DST): UTC+02:00 (CEST)
- INSEE/Postal code: 80114 /80160
- ^{1} French Land Register data, which excludes lakes, ponds, glaciers > 1 km^{2} (0.386 sq mi or 247 acres) and river estuaries.

Bosquel (French pronunciation: [bɔskɛl]; Picard: L’Boutchi) is a commune in the Somme department in Hauts-de-France in northern France.

== Geography ==
Bosquel is situated on the D920 road, less than a mile from the A16 autoroute, some 14 miles (23 km) south of Amiens.

== Population ==
Historical population
Year	Pop.	±% p.a.
1968	296	—
1975	254	−2.16%
1982	280	+1.40%
1990	303	+0.99%
1999	293	−0.37%
2007	300	+0.30%
2012	302	+0.13%
2017	334	+2.03%
2023	349	+0.73%
Source: INSEE

== See also ==
- Communes of the Somme department
- Raymond Couvègnes
