= Monsures =

- Commune
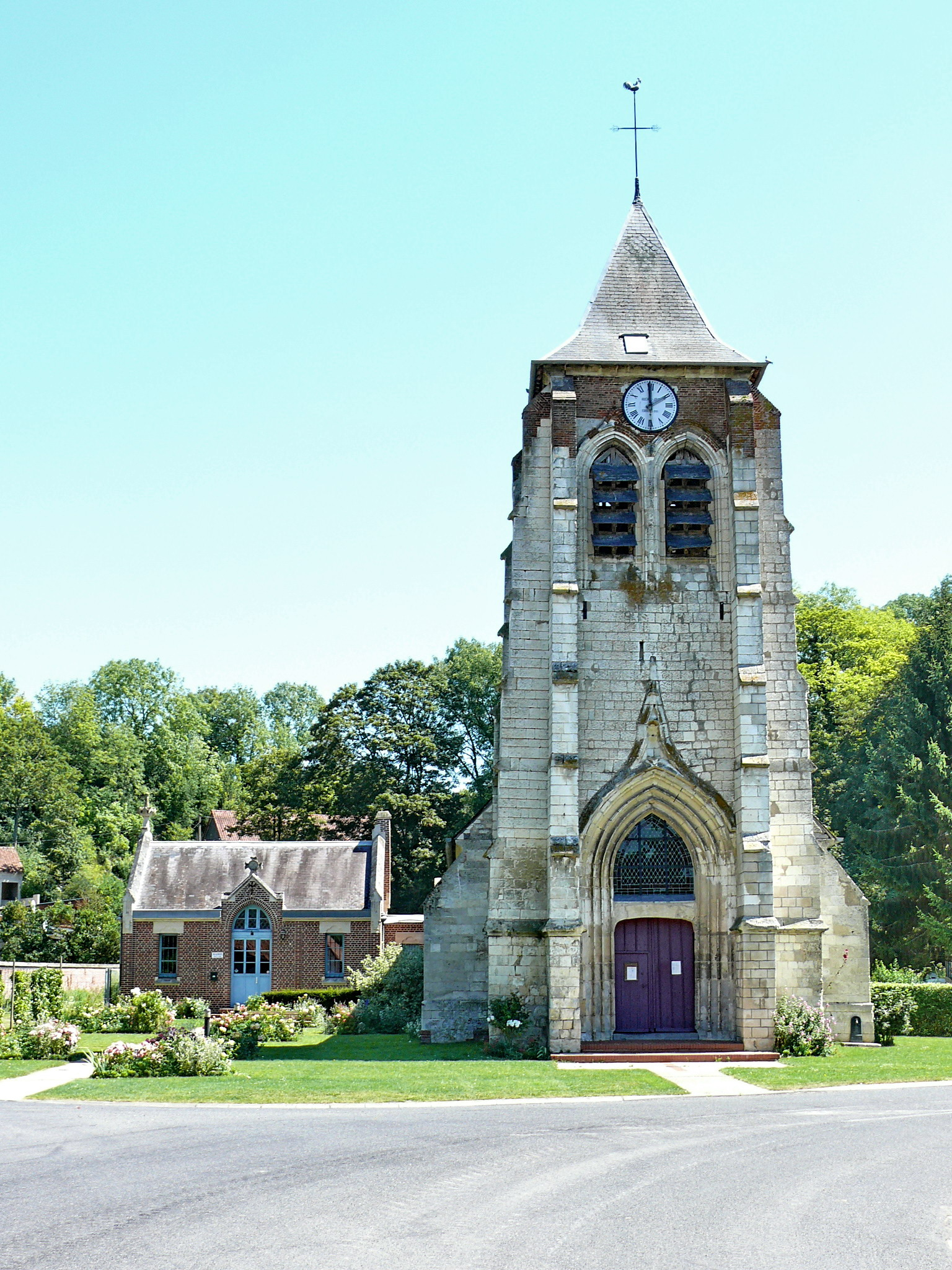
- The church and town hall in Monsures
- Location of Monsures
- Location within France Location within Hauts-de-France
- Coordinates: 49°42′36″N 2°10′19″E
- Country: France
- Region: Hauts-de-France
- Department: Somme
- Arrondissement: Amiens
- Canton: Ailly-sur-Noye
- Intercommunality: CC Somme Sud-Ouest

Government
  - Mayor (2020–2026): Aubert Wattez
- Area^{1}: 8.98 km^{2} (3.47 sq mi)
- Elevation: 66 m (217 ft)
- Highest elevation: 185 m (607 ft)
- Lowest elevation: 62 m (203 ft)
- Population (2023): 216
  - Density: 24.1/km^{2} (62.3/sq mi)
- Time zone: UTC+01:00 (CET)
  - Summer (DST): UTC+02:00 (CEST)
- INSEE/Postal code: 80558 /80160
- ^{1} French Land Register data, which excludes lakes, ponds, glaciers > 1 km^{2} (0.386 sq mi or 247 acres) and river estuaries.

Monsures (French pronunciation: [mɔ̃syʁ]) is a commune in the Somme department in Hauts-de-France in northern France.

== Geography ==
Monsures is situated on the D210 and the D109 roads, some 16 miles (26 km) south of Amiens, in the southernmost point of the département, in the valley of the Selle river and surrounded by woods and forests. Junction 7 of the A16 autoroute is just 4 miles (6 km) away

== Population ==
Historical population
Year	Pop.	±% p.a.
1968	230	—
1975	197	−2.19%
1982	152	−3.64%
1990	162	+0.80%
1999	203	+2.54%
2007	239	+2.06%
2012	227	−1.02%
2017	227	+0.00%
2023	216	−0.82%
Source: INSEE

== History ==
A fort existed here at the end of the 9th century. Originally known as Monsulae, in the 12th century, it belonged to the seigneurs of the nearby commune of Conty.

The Beauvais – Amiens railway line once passed through the commune. Used for freight and passengers from 1876 until 1939, but never reopened following World War II.

On 14 May 1923, a Farman F.60 Goliath of Air Union crashed at Monsures following structural failure of a wing in flight. All six people on board were killed.

== Places of interest ==
- The château-fort entrance and its 15th-century towers, on the promontory at the west of the village.
- Church of Saint Leger, bishop of Autun (616–678). First documented in 1127. The present building dates from the end of the 15th century and is built of local stone. The tower underwent restoration in 1731 and the present bells were installed in 1821 and 1868.
- The old sacristy. On the south side of the church and along with the nearby presbytery, built in the second half of the 19th century. Since December 1998, it has housed the Mairie.
- The early 16th century chapel of Notre-Dame du Bon Secours at Estocq, a hamlet of the commune. It originally belonged to the Thierry family, fiefs of Argenlieu - an old commune now occupied by Monsures and by Rogy, to the edge of the commune of Gouy-les-Groseillers. The stone quarried from the locality was used to build the old manor and the chapel at Estocq.
- The chapel of Notre-Dame des Victoires was built in 1858 by Charlemagne Boyeldieu, a descendant of General Louis-Léger Boyeldieu, who was born at Monsures in 1774. Since 2004, the chapel has housed the commune's multi-media library.
- The Coulée verte. A nature trail for hikers and riders, based on the route of the old railway, wends its way along the valley of the Selle river for about 20 miles, from Crèvecœur-le-Grand to Vers-sur-Selles.

== Personalities ==
- Louis Léger Boyeldieu

== See also ==
- Communes of the Somme department
