= Fossemanant =

- Commune
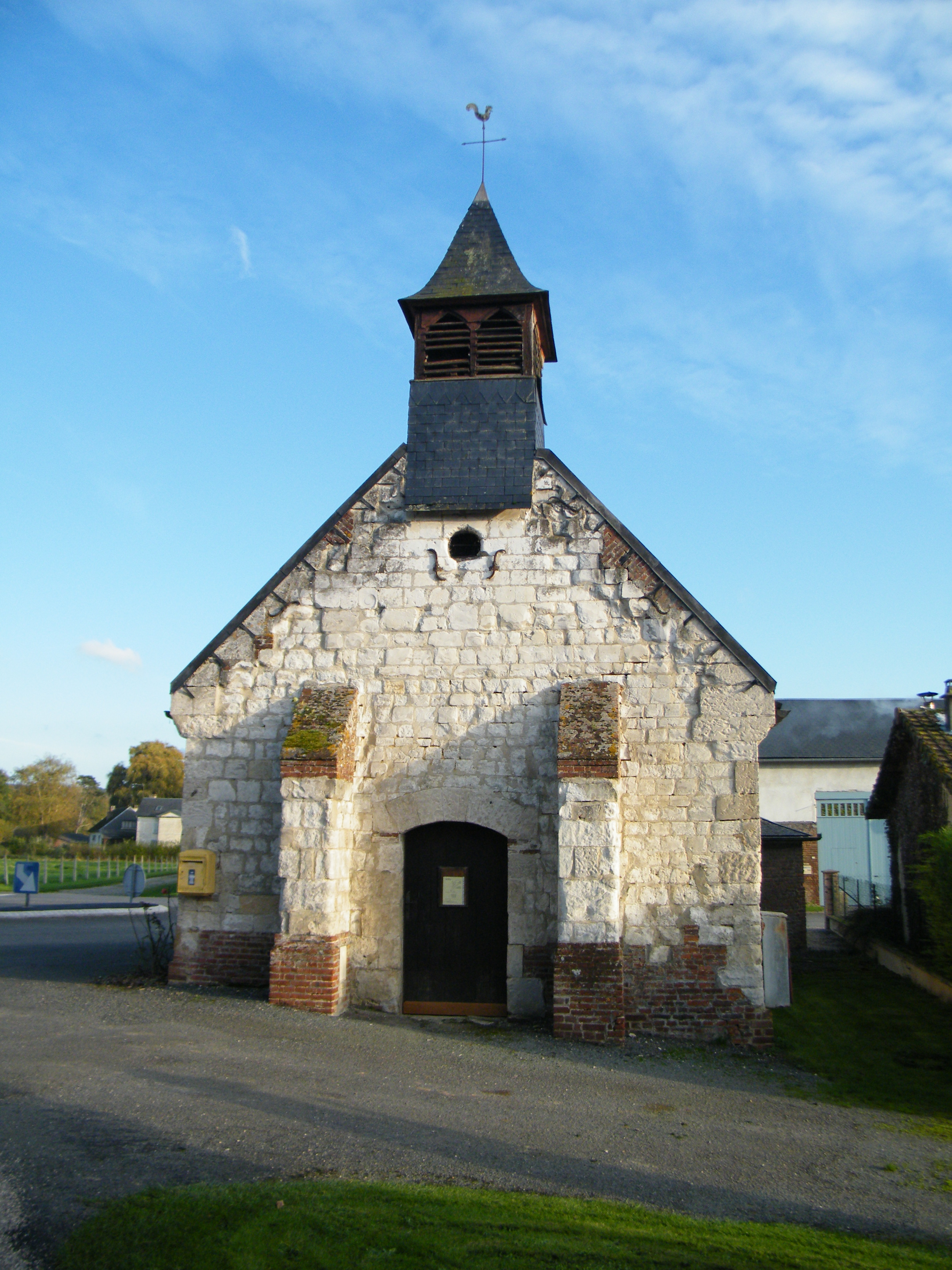
- The church in Fossemanant
- Location of Fossemanant
- Location within France Location within Hauts-de-France
- Coordinates: 49°48′14″N 2°11′56″E
- Country: France
- Region: Hauts-de-France
- Department: Somme
- Arrondissement: Amiens
- Canton: Ailly-sur-Noye
- Intercommunality: CC Somme Sud-Ouest

Government
  - Mayor (2020–2026): André Lefèvre
- Area^{1}: 2.7 km^{2} (1.0 sq mi)
- Elevation: 53 m (174 ft)
- Highest elevation: 128 m (420 ft)
- Lowest elevation: 40 m (130 ft)
- Population (2023): 100
  - Density: 37/km^{2} (96/sq mi)
- Time zone: UTC+01:00 (CET)
  - Summer (DST): UTC+02:00 (CEST)
- INSEE/Postal code: 80334 /80160
- ^{1} French Land Register data, which excludes lakes, ponds, glaciers > 1 km^{2} (0.386 sq mi or 247 acres) and river estuaries.

Fossemanant (French pronunciation: [fosmanɑ̃]; Picard: Fosménant) is a commune in the Somme department in Hauts-de-France in northern France.

== Geography ==
Fossemanant is situated on the D8 road, some 8 miles (13 km) southwest of Amiens on the banks of the river Selle, a small tributary of the river Somme.

== Population ==
Historical population
Year	Pop.	±% p.a.
1968	52	—
1975	39	−4.03%
1982	81	+11.01%
1990	109	+3.78%
1999	110	+0.10%
2007	110	+0.00%
2012	104	−1.12%
2017	93	−2.21%
2023	100	+1.22%
Source: INSEE

== See also ==
- Communes of the Somme department
