= Plachy-Buyon =

- Commune
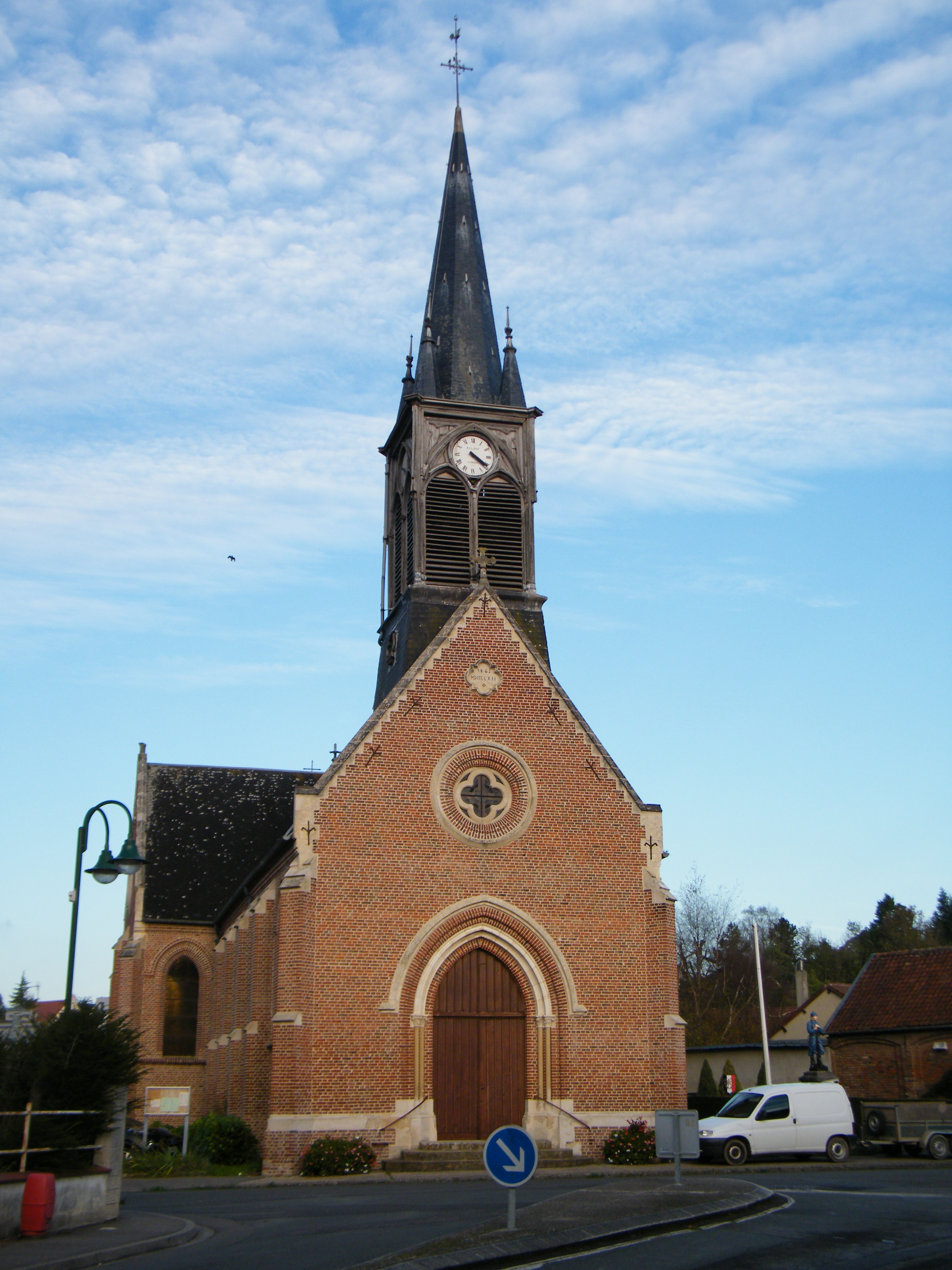
- The church in Plachy-Buyon

- Coat of arms
- Location of Plachy-Buyon
- Location within France Location within Hauts-de-France
- Coordinates: 49°48′59″N 2°13′11″E
- Country: France
- Region: Hauts-de-France
- Department: Somme
- Arrondissement: Amiens
- Canton: Ailly-sur-Noye
- Intercommunality: CC Somme Sud-Ouest

Government
  - Mayor (2020–2026): Jean-Luc Huyon
- Area^{1}: 10.13 km^{2} (3.91 sq mi)
- Elevation: 40 m (130 ft)
- Highest elevation: 122 m (400 ft)
- Lowest elevation: 37 m (121 ft)
- Population (2023): 897
  - Density: 88.5/km^{2} (229/sq mi)
- Time zone: UTC+01:00 (CET)
  - Summer (DST): UTC+02:00 (CEST)
- INSEE/Postal code: 80627 /80160
- ^{1} French Land Register data, which excludes lakes, ponds, glaciers > 1 km^{2} (0.386 sq mi or 247 acres) and river estuaries.

Plachy-Buyon (French pronunciation: [plaʃi bɥijɔ̃]; Picard: Plachy-Bion) is a commune in the Somme department in Hauts-de-France in northern France.

== Geography ==
The commune is situated on the D8 road, some 8 miles (13 km) south of Amiens, in the valley of the Selle river, a tributary of the Somme. It is heavily influenced by the proximity of Amiens. 28% of the inhabitants are under the age of twenty.

== Population ==
Historical population
| Year | Pop. | ±% p.a. |
|---|---|---|
| 1968 | 340 | — |
| 1975 | 462 | +4.48% |
| 1982 | 767 | +7.51% |
| 1990 | 799 | +0.51% |
| 1999 | 929 | +1.69% |
| 2007 | 894 | −0.48% |
| 2012 | 896 | +0.04% |
| 2017 | 878 | −0.41% |
| 2023 | 897 | +0.36% |
Source: INSEE

== Places of interest ==
- The new mairie, inaugurated on 14 October 2006.
- The old paper mill. Built around 1838–1844, on the site of an old watermill.
- Protected wooded valley site.
- The nineteenth century church of Saint-Martin.
- Traces of two Gallo-Roman villas.

== See also ==
- Communes of the Somme department
