= Nampty =

- Commune
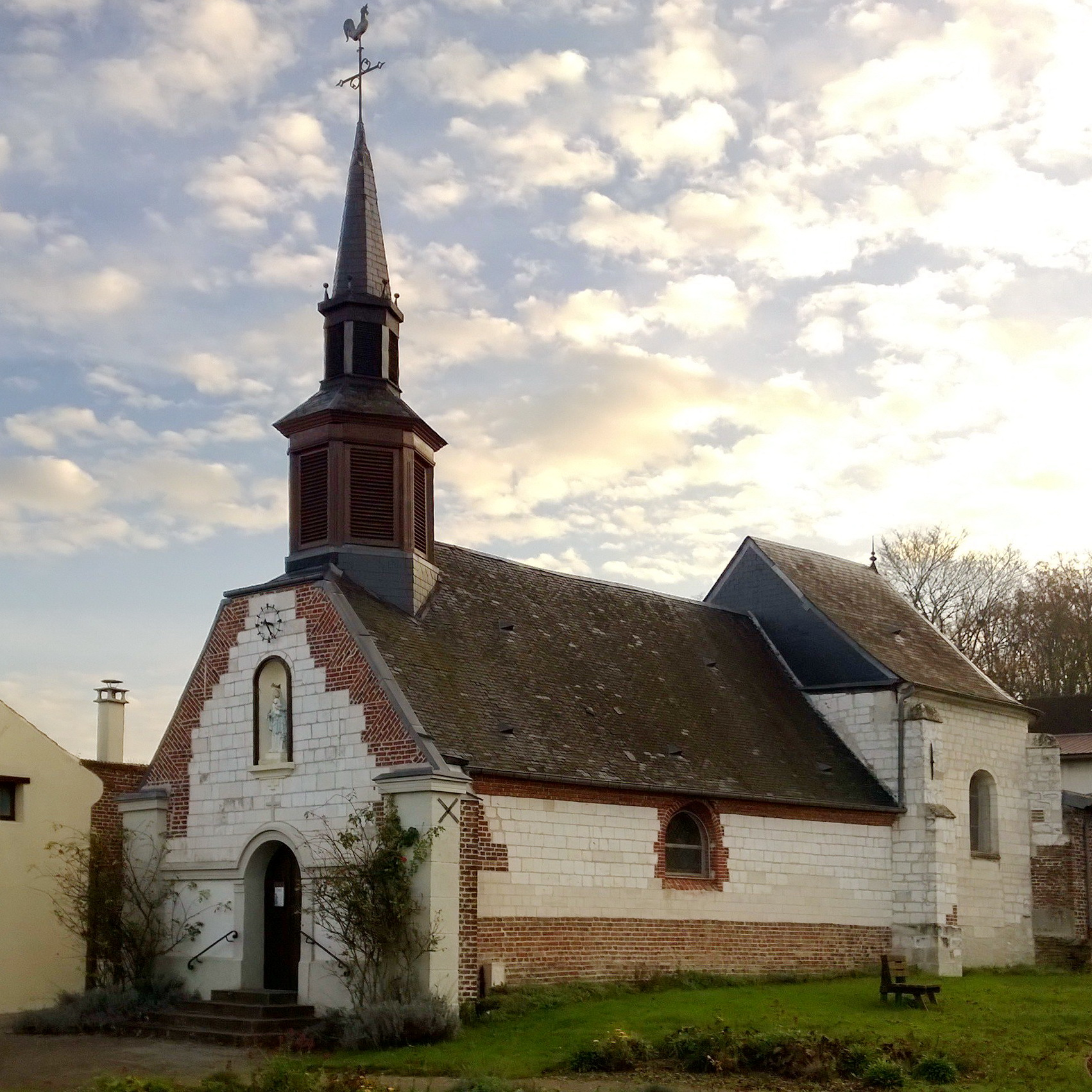
- The chapel in Nampty
- Location of Nampty
- Location within France Location within Hauts-de-France
- Coordinates: 49°47′42″N 2°12′14″E
- Country: France
- Region: Hauts-de-France
- Department: Somme
- Arrondissement: Amiens
- Canton: Ailly-sur-Noye
- Intercommunality: CC Somme Sud-Ouest

Government
  - Mayor (2024–2026): Pascal Delaporte
- Area^{1}: 5.21 km^{2} (2.01 sq mi)
- Elevation: 114 m (374 ft)
- Highest elevation: 145 m (476 ft)
- Lowest elevation: 40 m (130 ft)
- Population (2023): 277
  - Density: 53.2/km^{2} (138/sq mi)
- Time zone: UTC+01:00 (CET)
  - Summer (DST): UTC+02:00 (CEST)
- INSEE/Postal code: 80583 /80160
- ^{1} French Land Register data, which excludes lakes, ponds, glaciers > 1 km^{2} (0.386 sq mi or 247 acres) and river estuaries.

Nampty is a commune in the Somme department in Hauts-de-France in northern France.

== Geography ==
Nampty is situated on the D8 road, on the banks of the river Selle, some 10 miles (16 km) south of Amiens.

== Population ==
Historical population
Year	Pop.	±% p.a.
1968	131	—
1975	135	+0.43%
1982	198	+5.62%
1990	196	−0.13%
1999	205	+0.50%
2007	239	+1.94%
2012	258	+1.54%
2017	289	+2.30%
2023	277	−0.70%
Source: INSEE

== See also ==
- Communes of the Somme department
