= Bacouel-sur-Selle =

- Commune
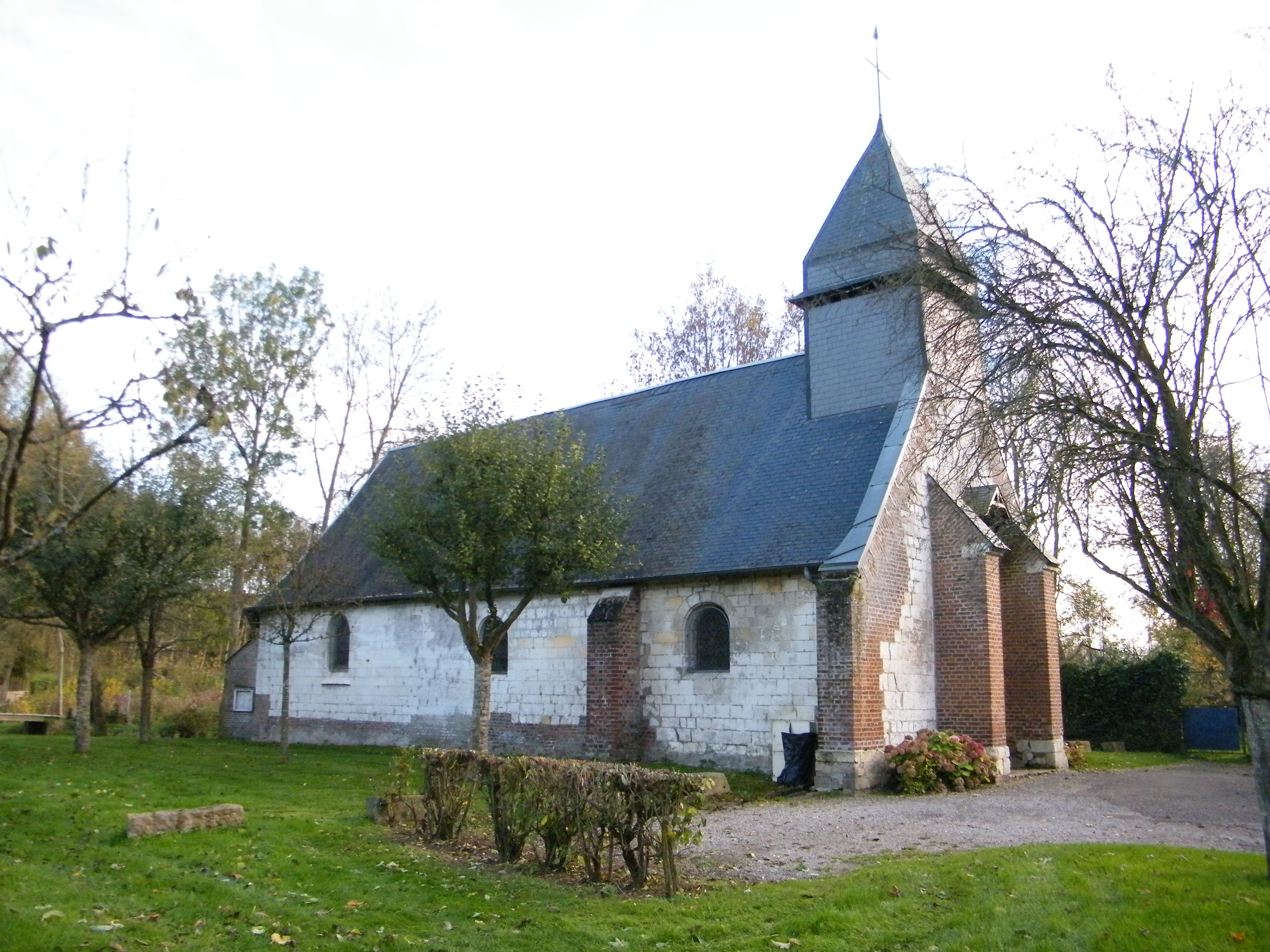
- The church of Bacouel-sur-Selle

- Coat of arms
- Location of Bacouel-sur-Selle
- Location within France Location within Hauts-de-France
- Coordinates: 49°49′53″N 2°13′31″E
- Country: France
- Region: Hauts-de-France
- Department: Somme
- Arrondissement: Amiens
- Canton: Ailly-sur-Noye
- Intercommunality: Somme Sud-Ouest

Government
  - Mayor (2020–2026): Marc Bulcourt
- Area^{1}: 6.24 km^{2} (2.41 sq mi)
- Elevation: 38 m (125 ft)
- Highest elevation: 121 m (397 ft)
- Lowest elevation: 36 m (118 ft)
- Population (2023): 461
  - Density: 73.9/km^{2} (191/sq mi)
- Time zone: UTC+01:00 (CET)
  - Summer (DST): UTC+02:00 (CEST)
- INSEE/Postal code: 80050 /80480
- ^{1} French Land Register data, which excludes lakes, ponds, glaciers > 1 km^{2} (0.386 sq mi or 247 acres) and river estuaries.

Bacouel-sur-Selle (French pronunciation: [bakwɛl syʁ sɛl], literally Bacouel on Selle; Picard: Bacoué-su-Selle) is a commune in the Somme department in Hauts-de-France in northern France.

== Geography ==
Situated 5 miles (8 km) southwest of Amiens, on the banks of the Selle river, a couple of kilometres from the A16 autoroute junction with the A29.

== Population ==
Historical population
Year	Pop.	±% p.a.
1968	227	—
1975	257	+1.79%
1982	326	+3.46%
1990	392	+2.33%
1999	574	+4.33%
2007	516	−1.32%
2012	465	−2.06%
2017	501	+1.50%
2023	461	−1.38%
Source: INSEE

== See also ==
- Communes of the Somme department
