= Brassy, Somme =

Brassy
- Commune
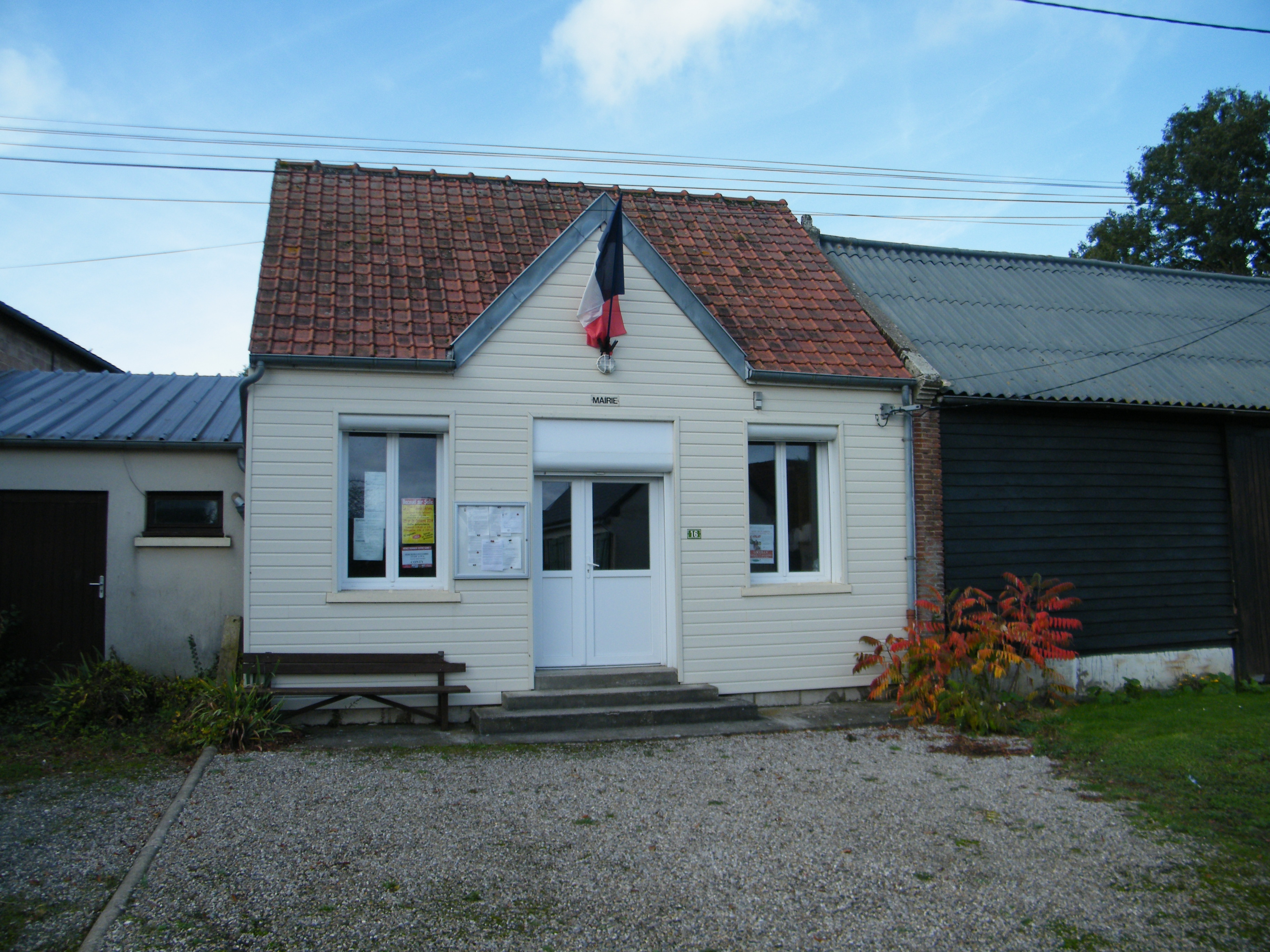
- The town hall in Brassy
- Location of Brassy
- Location within France Location within Hauts-de-France
- Coordinates: 49°43′48″N 2°02′38″E
- Country: France
- Region: Hauts-de-France
- Department: Somme
- Arrondissement: Amiens
- Canton: Ailly-sur-Noye
- Intercommunality: CC Somme Sud-Ouest

Government
  - Mayor (2020–2026): Ludovic Boulenger
- Area^{1}: 2.41 km^{2} (0.93 sq mi)
- Elevation: 184 m (604 ft)
- Highest elevation: 187 m (614 ft)
- Lowest elevation: 129 m (423 ft)
- Population (2023): 82
  - Density: 34/km^{2} (88/sq mi)
- Time zone: UTC+01:00 (CET)
  - Summer (DST): UTC+02:00 (CEST)
- INSEE/Postal code: 80134 /80160
- ^{1} French Land Register data, which excludes lakes, ponds, glaciers > 1 km^{2} (0.386 sq mi or 247 acres) and river estuaries.

Brassy (French pronunciation: [bʁasi]) is a commune in the Somme department in Hauts-de-France in northern France.

== Demography ==
Historical population
Year	Pop.	±% p.a.
1968	50	—
1975	46	−1.18%
1982	56	+2.85%
1990	52	−0.92%
1999	51	−0.22%
2007	61	+2.26%
2012	62	+0.33%
2017	74	+3.60%
2023	82	+1.73%
Source: INSEE

== See also ==
- Communes of the Somme department
