= Essertaux =

- Commune
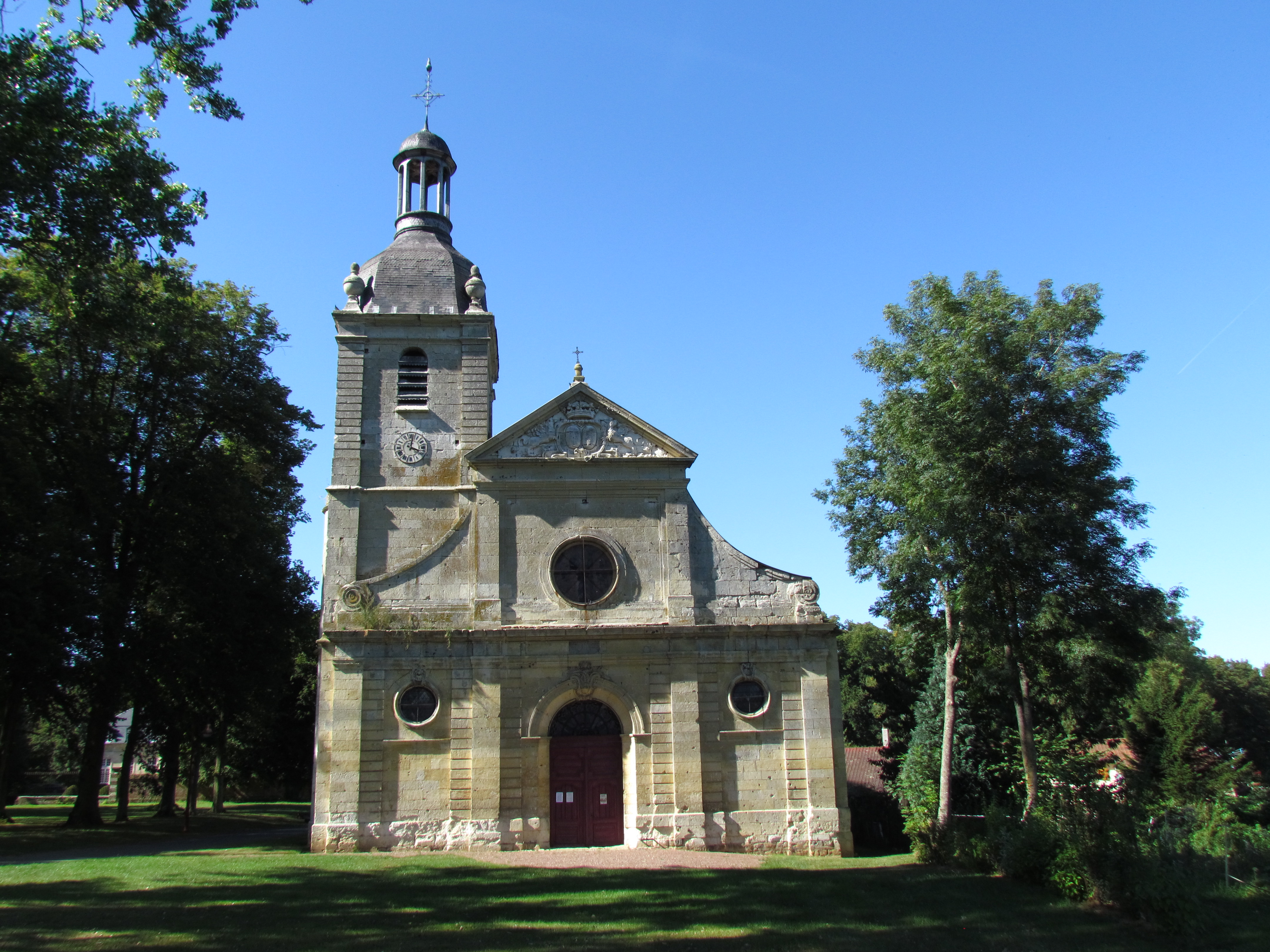
- The church in Essertaux
- Location of Essertaux
- Location within France Location within Hauts-de-France
- Coordinates: 49°44′28″N 2°14′44″E
- Country: France
- Region: Hauts-de-France
- Department: Somme
- Arrondissement: Amiens
- Canton: Ailly-sur-Noye
- Intercommunality: CC Somme Sud-Ouest

Government
  - Mayor (2020–2026): Jean Dubois
- Area^{1}: 6.6 km^{2} (2.5 sq mi)
- Elevation: 147 m (482 ft)
- Highest elevation: 154 m (505 ft)
- Lowest elevation: 100 m (330 ft)
- Population (2023): 270
  - Density: 41/km^{2} (110/sq mi)
- Time zone: UTC+01:00 (CET)
  - Summer (DST): UTC+02:00 (CEST)
- INSEE/Postal code: 80285 /80160
- ^{1} French Land Register data, which excludes lakes, ponds, glaciers > 1 km^{2} (0.386 sq mi or 247 acres) and river estuaries.

Essertaux (French pronunciation: [esɛʁto]; Picard: Chartieu ) is a commune in the Somme department in Hauts-de-France in northern France.

== Geography ==
Essertaux is situated on the junction of the A16 autoroute, the N1 and the D920 roads, some 12 miles (19 km) south of Amiens.

== Population ==
Historical population
Year	Pop.	±% p.a.
1968	135	—
1975	153	+1.80%
1982	154	+0.09%
1990	197	+3.13%
1999	199	+0.11%
2007	250	+2.89%
2012	243	−0.57%
2017	262	+1.52%
2023	270	+0.50%
Source: INSEE

== See also ==
- Communes of the Somme department
