= Fleury, Somme =

Fleury
- Commune
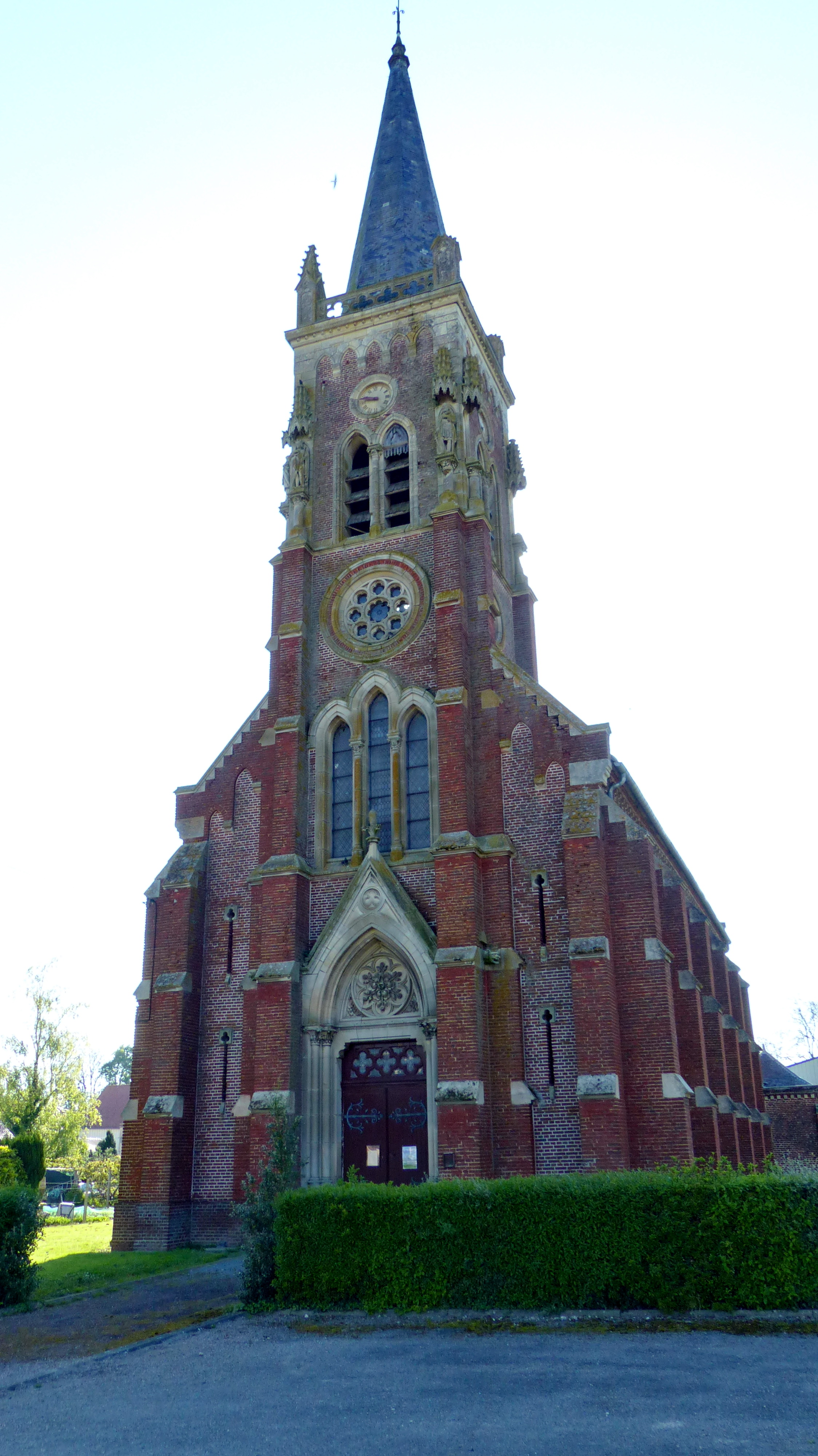
- The church in Fleury
- Location of Fleury
- Location within France Location within Hauts-de-France
- Coordinates: 49°44′31″N 2°07′12″E
- Country: France
- Region: Hauts-de-France
- Department: Somme
- Arrondissement: Amiens
- Canton: Ailly-sur-Noye
- Intercommunality: CC Somme Sud-Ouest

Government
  - Mayor (2020–2026): Jean-Marie Rouzaud
- Area^{1}: 9.42 km^{2} (3.64 sq mi)
- Elevation: 63 m (207 ft)
- Highest elevation: 185 m (607 ft)
- Lowest elevation: 55 m (180 ft)
- Population (2023): 206
  - Density: 21.9/km^{2} (56.6/sq mi)
- Time zone: UTC+01:00 (CET)
  - Summer (DST): UTC+02:00 (CEST)
- INSEE/Postal code: 80317 /80160
- ^{1} French Land Register data, which excludes lakes, ponds, glaciers > 1 km^{2} (0.386 sq mi or 247 acres) and river estuaries.

Fleury (French pronunciation: [flœʁi]; Picard: Floury ) is a commune in the Somme department in Hauts-de-France in northern France.

== Geography ==
Fleury is situated on the D920 road, on the banks of the river Selle, some 15 miles (24 km) southwest of Amiens.

== Population ==
Historical population
Year	Pop.	±% p.a.
1968	145	—
1975	163	+1.69%
1982	223	+4.58%
1990	193	−1.79%
1999	200	+0.40%
2007	220	+1.20%
2012	238	+1.59%
2017	223	−1.29%
2023	206	−1.31%
Source: INSEE

== See also ==
- Communes of the Somme department
