= Belleuse =

- Commune
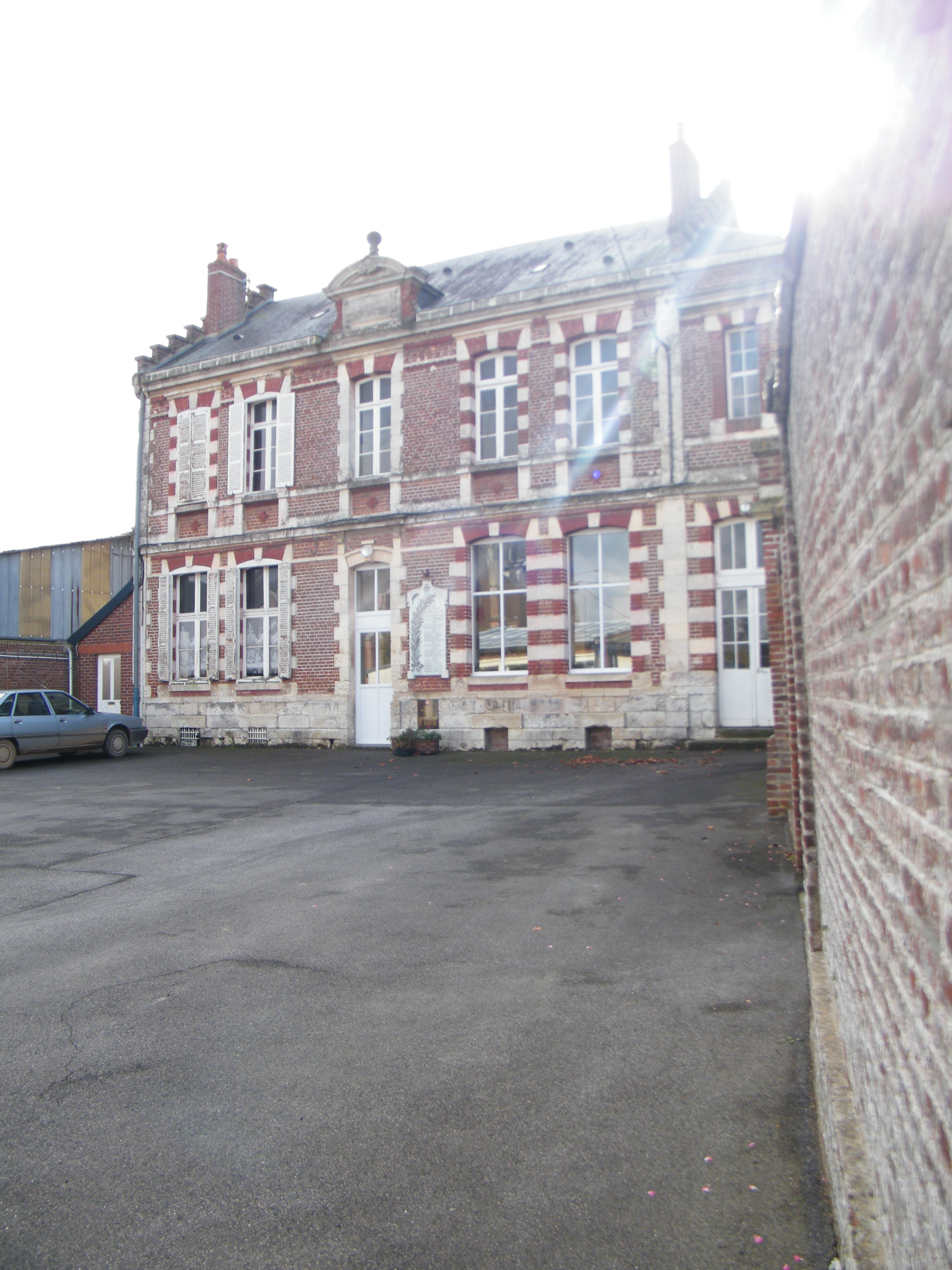
- The town hall in Belleuse
- Location of Belleuse
- Location within France Location within Hauts-de-France
- Coordinates: 49°42′25″N 2°07′05″E
- Country: France
- Region: Hauts-de-France
- Department: Somme
- Arrondissement: Amiens
- Canton: Ailly-sur-Noye
- Intercommunality: CC Somme Sud-Ouest

Government
  - Mayor (2020–2026): Thibaut Domisse
- Area^{1}: 7.8 km^{2} (3.0 sq mi)
- Elevation: 190 m (620 ft)
- Highest elevation: 194 m (636 ft)
- Lowest elevation: 95 m (312 ft)
- Population (2023): 297
  - Density: 38/km^{2} (99/sq mi)
- Time zone: UTC+01:00 (CET)
  - Summer (DST): UTC+02:00 (CEST)
- INSEE/Postal code: 80079 /80160
- ^{1} French Land Register data, which excludes lakes, ponds, glaciers > 1 km^{2} (0.386 sq mi or 247 acres) and river estuaries.

Belleuse (French pronunciation: [bɛløz]; Picard: Béleu) is a commune in the Somme department in Hauts-de-France in northern France.

== Geography ==
Belleuse is situated on the D8 road, some 20 miles (32 km) southwest of Amiens.

== Population ==
Historical population
Year	Pop.	±% p.a.
1968	327	—
1975	258	−3.33%
1982	246	−0.68%
1990	258	+0.60%
1999	280	+0.91%
2007	322	+1.76%
2012	354	+1.91%
2017	357	+0.17%
2023	297	−3.02%
Source: INSEE

== See also ==
- Communes of the Somme department
