= Frémontiers =

- Commune
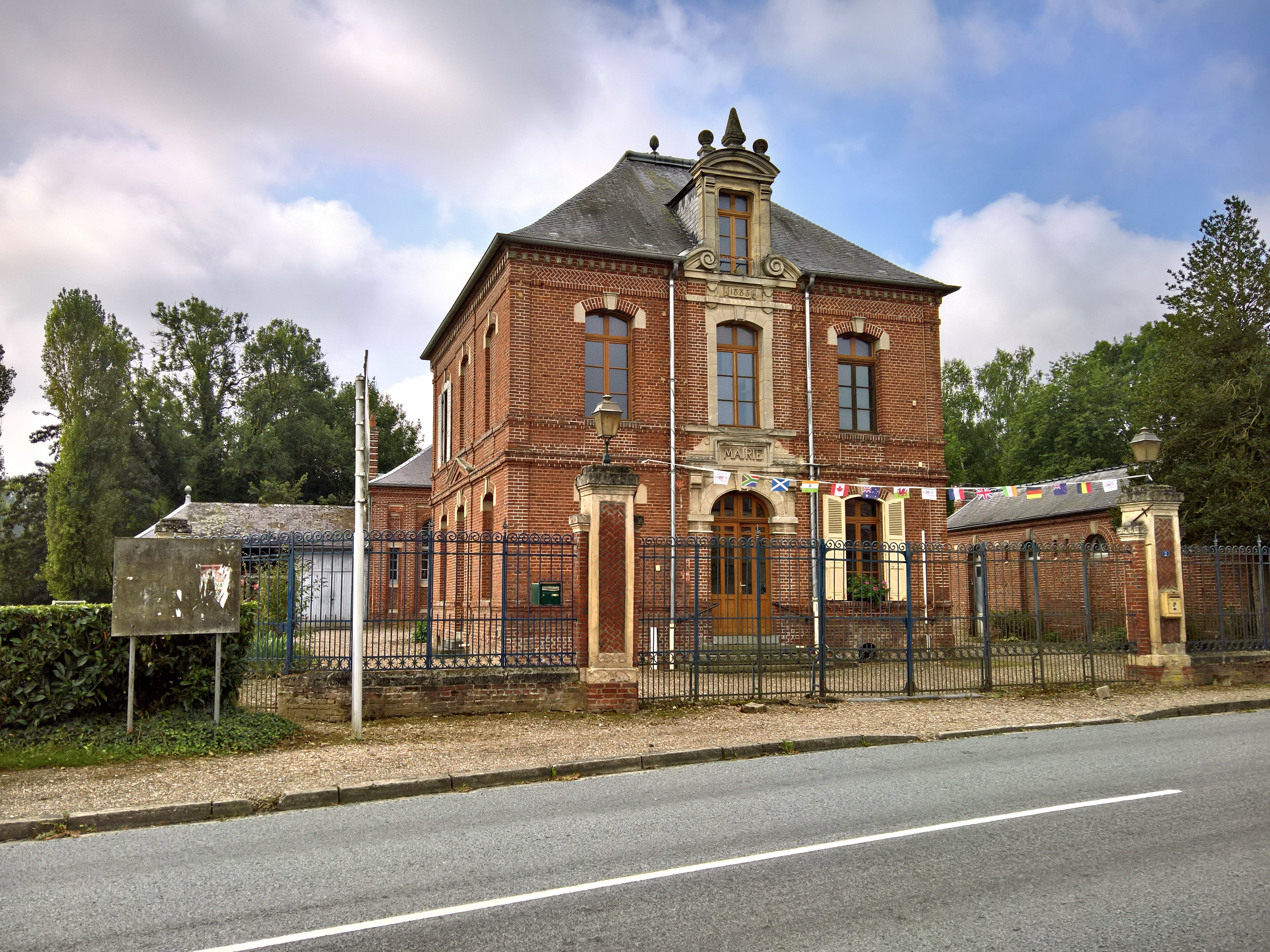
- The town hall in Frémontiers
- Location of Frémontiers
- Location within France Location within Hauts-de-France
- Coordinates: 49°45′35″N 2°04′31″E
- Country: France
- Region: Hauts-de-France
- Department: Somme
- Arrondissement: Amiens
- Canton: Ailly-sur-Noye
- Intercommunality: CC Somme Sud-Ouest

Government
  - Mayor (2020–2026): Alain Domart
- Area^{1}: 12.89 km^{2} (4.98 sq mi)
- Elevation: 74 m (243 ft)
- Highest elevation: 165 m (541 ft)
- Lowest elevation: 67 m (220 ft)
- Population (2023): 166
  - Density: 12.9/km^{2} (33.4/sq mi)
- Time zone: UTC+01:00 (CET)
  - Summer (DST): UTC+02:00 (CEST)
- INSEE/Postal code: 80352 /80160
- ^{1} French Land Register data, which excludes lakes, ponds, glaciers > 1 km^{2} (0.386 sq mi or 247 acres) and river estuaries.

Frémontiers (French pronunciation: [fʁemɔ̃tje]; Picard: Frémontyi) is a commune in the Somme department in Hauts-de-France in northern France.

== Geography ==
The commune is situated 15 miles (25 km) southwest of Amiens on the junction of the D138 and D920 roads

== Population ==
Historical population
Year	Pop.	±% p.a.
1968	163	—
1975	165	+0.17%
1982	141	−2.22%
1990	146	+0.44%
1999	180	+2.35%
2007	165	−1.08%
2012	150	−1.89%
2017	154	+0.53%
2023	166	+1.26%
Source: INSEE

== Places of interest ==
- The church
- The watermill
- Frémontiers woods

== See also ==
- Communes of the Somme department
- Jacques Frémontier (born surname Friedman; 1930–2020), French journalist and television producer
