= Lœuilly =

- Part of Ô-de-Selle
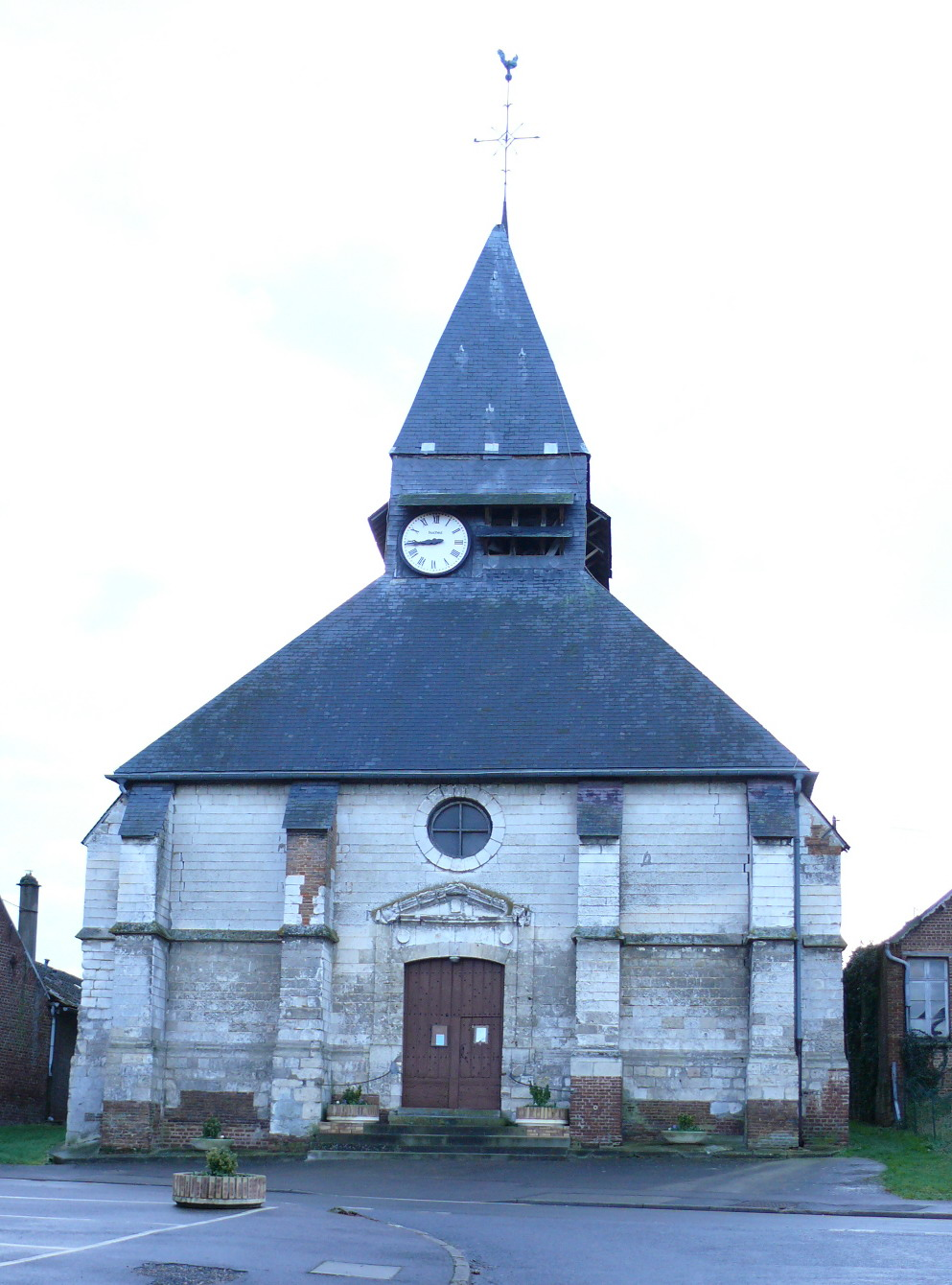
- The church in Lœuilly

- Coat of arms
- Location of Lœuilly
- Location within France Location within Hauts-de-France
- Coordinates: 49°46′36″N 2°10′34″E
- Country: France
- Region: Hauts-de-France
- Department: Somme
- Arrondissement: Amiens
- Canton: Ailly-sur-Noye
- Commune: Ô-de-Selle
- Area^{1}: 17.21 km^{2} (6.64 sq mi)
- Elevation: 53 m (174 ft)
- Highest elevation: 152 m (499 ft)
- Lowest elevation: 42 m (138 ft)
- Population (2022): 792
  - Density: 46.0/km^{2} (119/sq mi)
- Time zone: UTC+01:00 (CET)
  - Summer (DST): UTC+02:00 (CEST)
- Postal code: 80160
- ^{1} French Land Register data, which excludes lakes, ponds, glaciers > 1 km^{2} (0.386 sq mi or 247 acres) and river estuaries.

Lœuilly (French pronunciation: [lœji]) is a former commune in the Somme department in Hauts-de-France in northern France. On 1 January 2019, it was merged into the new commune Ô-de-Selle.

== Geography ==
Lœuilly is situated on the D8 road, some 10 miles (16 km) southwest of Amiens, on the banks of a tributary of the Somme river, the river Selle, which splits here into streams and forms many lakes.

The commune is subject to flooding and has measures in place to prevent it.

== History ==
Lœuilly was inhabited during Gallo-Roman times. The first settlement was alongside the river near a drinking trough, fed by a spring, the Blaire fountain. The water, renowned for its digestive qualities, was sold to the public, before mains water was available.
In 1472, Burgundian troops led by Charles the Bold destroyed the château.
In 1593, the inhabitants tried in vain to stop the Catholic League coming into the village, which was partially burnt down.

Many watermills, and later, factories powered by the water, sprang up along the river, to take advantage of the natural force. A mill pond once filled the area near where the Mairie and car-park are found today.

The railway from Beauvais to Amiens ran through the town from 1876 to 1939. The old route is now a popular walk.

== Places of interest ==
- The parish church, l'église Saint-Martin, is a seventeenth-century building. The clock on the bell-tower is unusually off-centre.
- Several old watermills on the banks of the river Selle

== Population ==
Historical population
| Year | Pop. | ±% p.a. |
|---|---|---|
| 1962 | 602 | — |
| 1968 | 621 | +0.52% |
| 1975 | 657 | +0.81% |
| 1982 | 831 | +3.41% |
| 1990 | 831 | +0.00% |
| 1999 | 809 | −0.30% |
| 2006 | 832 | +0.40% |
| 2022 | 792 | −0.31% |
Source: EHESS and INSEE

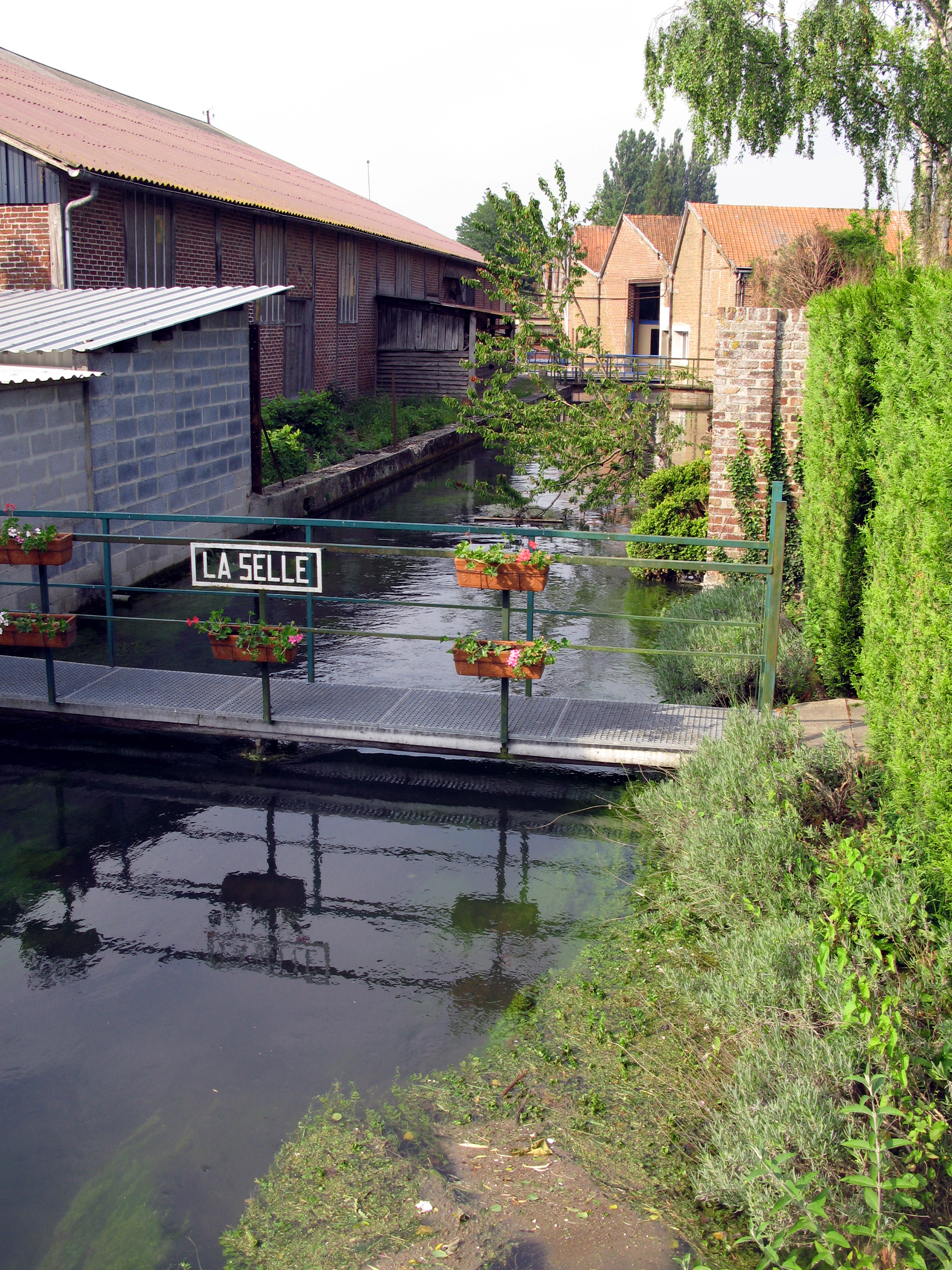
The Selle

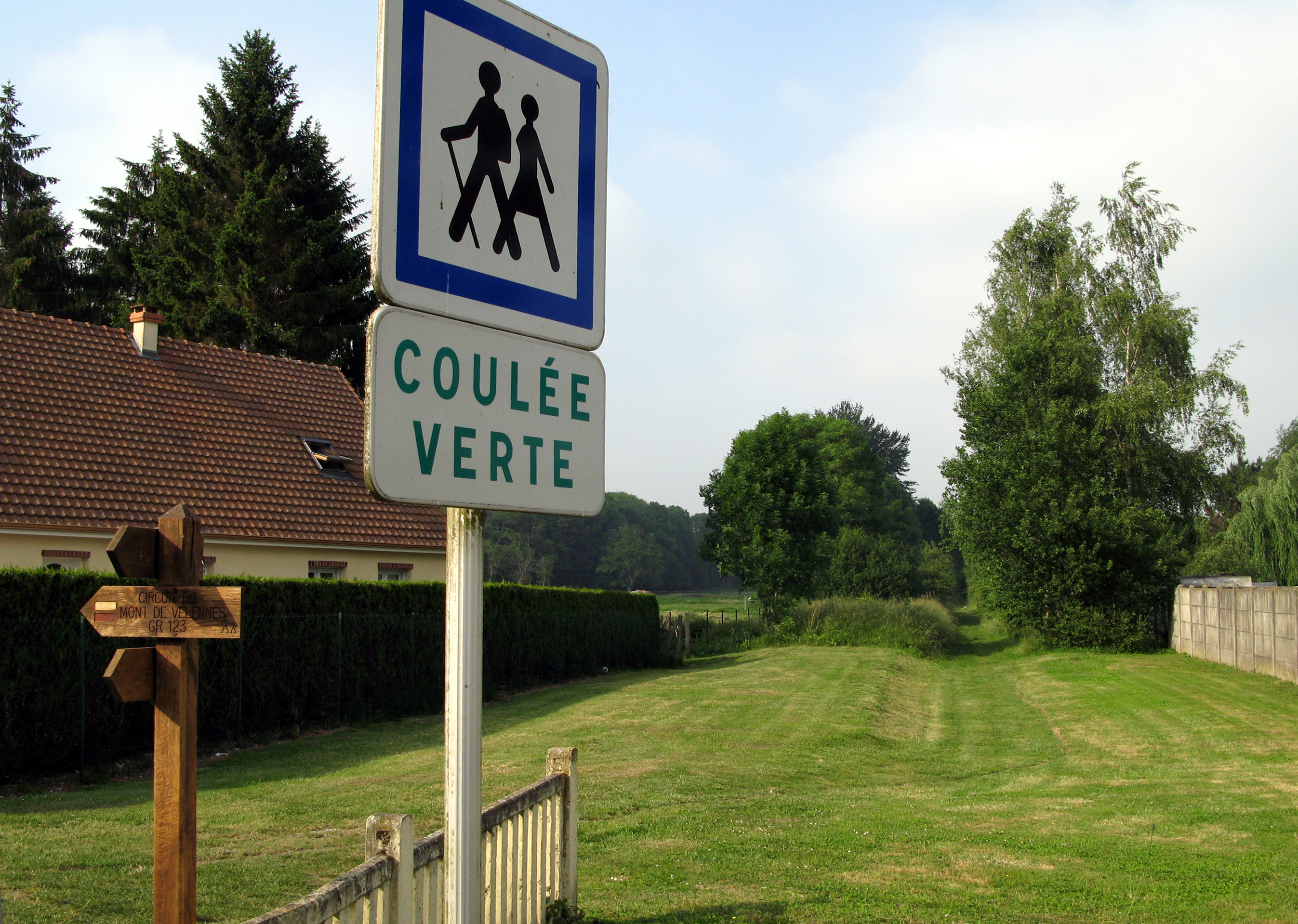
The old railway line

== See also ==
- Communes of the Somme department
