= Tilloy-lès-Conty =

- Part of Ô-de-Selle
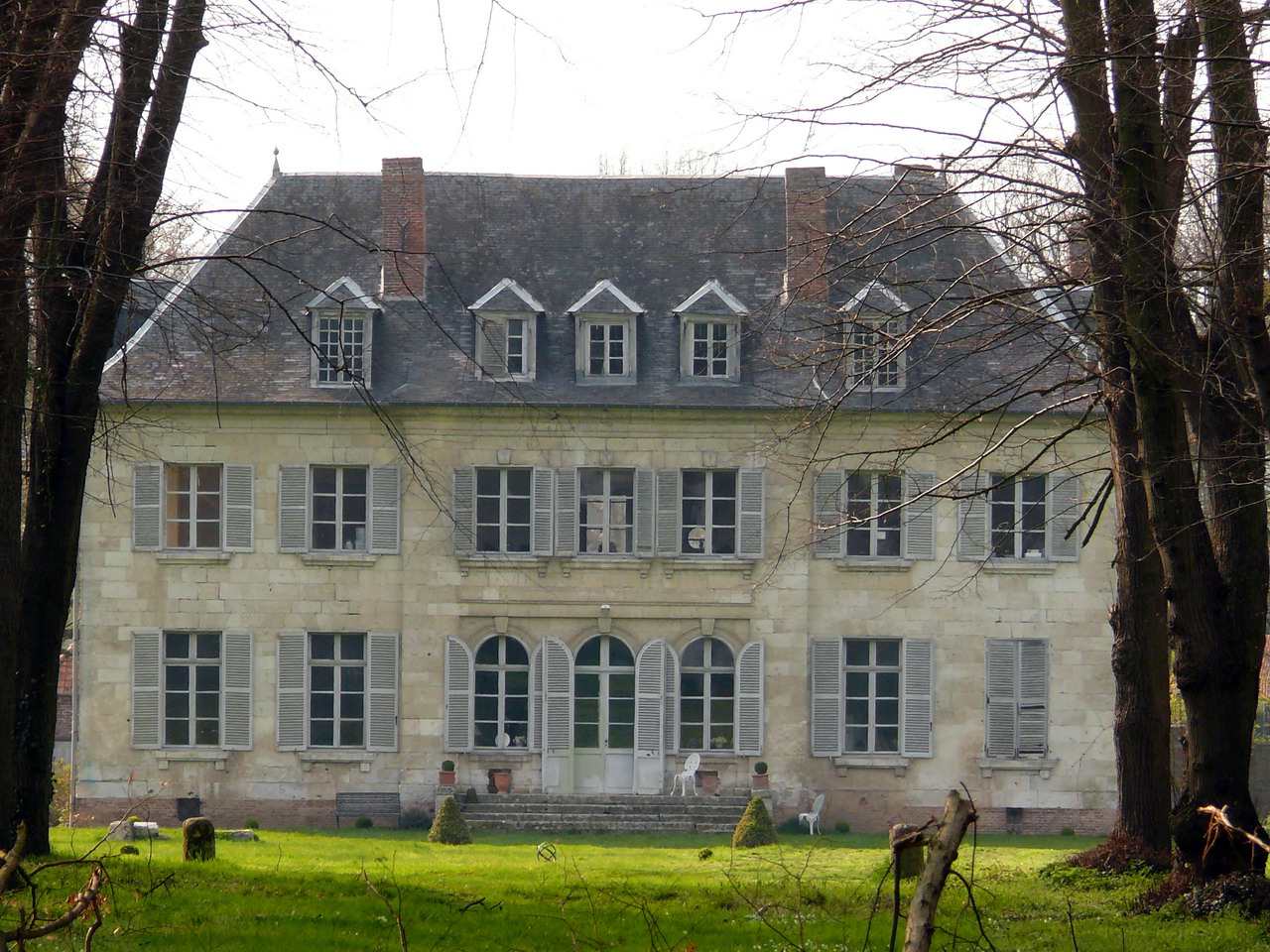
- Chateau of Tilloy-lès-Conty
- Location of Tilloy-lès-Conty
- Location within France Location within Hauts-de-France
- Coordinates: 49°45′18″N 2°10′39″E
- Country: France
- Region: Hauts-de-France
- Department: Somme
- Arrondissement: Amiens
- Canton: Ailly-sur-Noye
- Commune: Ô-de-Selle
- Area^{1}: 6.34 km^{2} (2.45 sq mi)
- Elevation: 105 m (344 ft)
- Highest elevation: 135 m (443 ft)
- Lowest elevation: 48 m (157 ft)
- Population (2022): 253
  - Density: 39.9/km^{2} (103/sq mi)
- Time zone: UTC+01:00 (CET)
  - Summer (DST): UTC+02:00 (CEST)
- Postal code: 80160
- ^{1} French Land Register data, which excludes lakes, ponds, glaciers > 1 km^{2} (0.386 sq mi or 247 acres) and river estuaries.

Tilloy-lès-Conty (French pronunciation: [tilwa lɛ kɔ̃ti], literally Tilloy near Conty) is a former commune in the Somme department in Hauts-de-France in northern France. On 1 January 2019, it was merged into the new commune Ô-de-Selle.

== Geography ==
The commune is situated 10 miles (16 km) south southwest of Amiens, on the D8e road

== Places of interest ==
- The seventeenth century church of Notre-Dame

=== Château de Tilloy-lès-Conty ===
This is the ancient fief of the seigneurs of the Croy family, restored as a country house at the end of the 17th century. It consists of a garden and a 9-hectare park, with a little English garden filled with 165 varieties of roses.

=== The gardens of the Pic-Vert ===
A 6000-square-metre garden built by Michel Driencourt around a large 19th-century Picardie farm, in four sections:

- A shady garden with old Japanese cherry trees
- An inner courtyard
- An old orchard and vegetable garden
- A conservatory of ancient varieties

2500 varieties of shrubs and perennials are on show with collections of delphinium, iris, poppies, magnolia, hydrangea and Japanese maples.

== See also ==
- Communes of the Somme department
