= Thoix =

- Commune
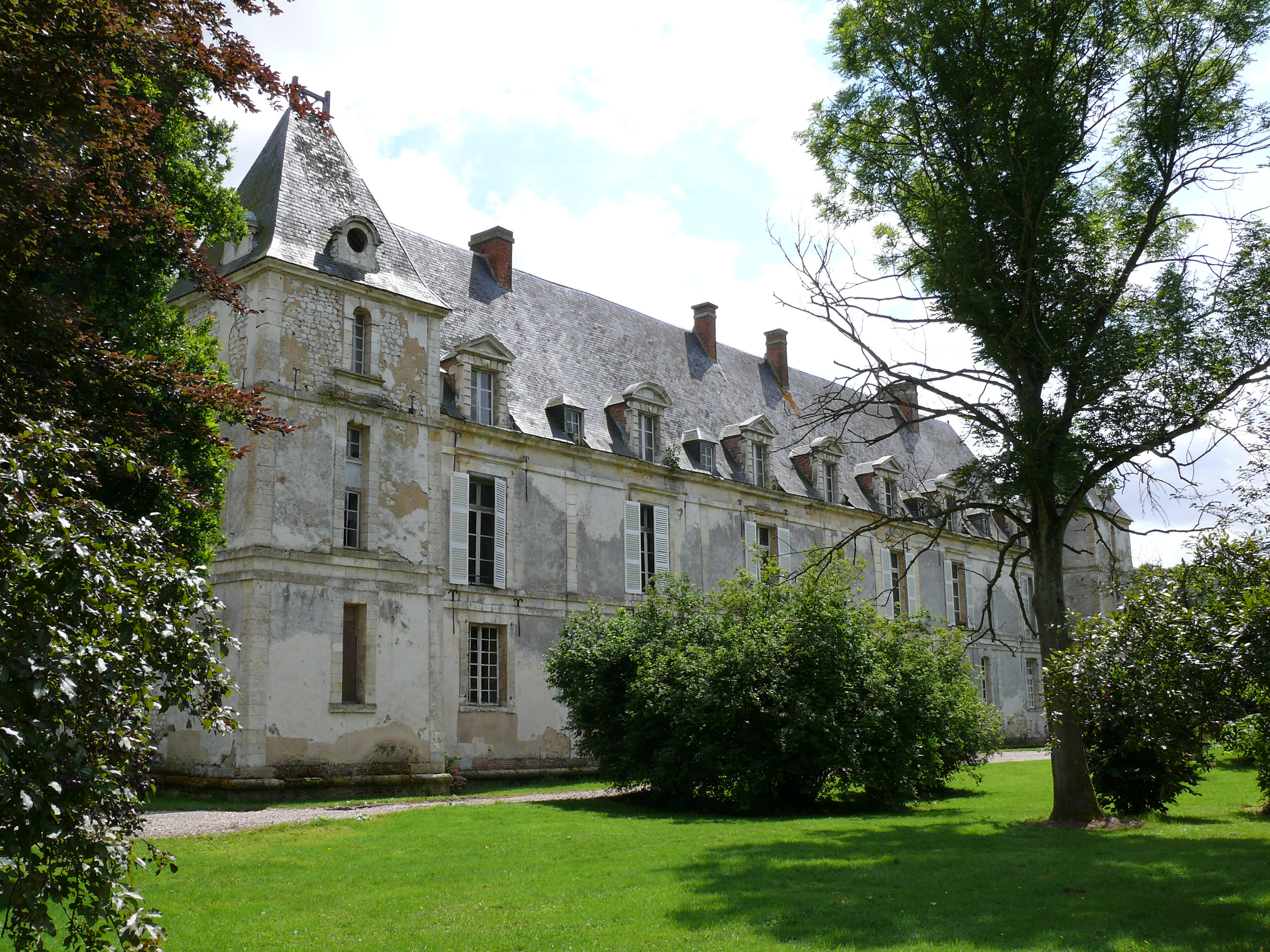
- Chateau of Thoix
- Location of Thoix
- Location within France Location within Hauts-de-France
- Coordinates: 49°45′22″N 2°04′12″E
- Country: France
- Region: Hauts-de-France
- Department: Somme
- Arrondissement: Amiens
- Canton: Ailly-sur-Noye
- Intercommunality: CC Somme Sud-Ouest

Government
  - Mayor (2020–2026): Frederic Marseille
- Area^{1}: 11.12 km^{2} (4.29 sq mi)
- Elevation: 40.00 m (131.23 ft)
- Highest elevation: 188 m (617 ft)
- Lowest elevation: 82 m (269 ft)
- Population (2023): 147
  - Density: 13.2/km^{2} (34.2/sq mi)
- Time zone: UTC+01:00 (CET)
  - Summer (DST): UTC+02:00 (CEST)
- INSEE/Postal code: 80757 /80160
- ^{1} French Land Register data, which excludes lakes, ponds, glaciers > 1 km^{2} (0.386 sq mi or 247 acres) and river estuaries.

Thoix (French pronunciation: [twa]; Picard: Toé) is a commune in the Somme department in the Hauts-de-France of northern France.

== Geography ==
Thoix is situated 15 miles (24 km) southwest of Amiens, on the D100 road. The Parquets river, a small tributary of the river Évoissons, which flows into the Selle, has its source in Thoix and also feeds the castle moat

== Population ==
Historical population
Year	Pop.	±% p.a.
1968	105	—
1975	114	+1.18%
1982	130	+1.89%
1990	135	+0.47%
1999	144	+0.72%
2007	135	−0.80%
2012	139	+0.59%
2017	144	+0.71%
2023	147	+0.34%
Source: INSEE

== History ==
The village has been known by many names over the centuries: Teoletum, Teoleium, Tois in 1140, Thois in 1212 and Thoys by 1301. The inhabitants are known as Téoduliens.

Guillaume Gouffier, seigneur de Bonnivet (1488–1525), a favourite of king Francis I, was seigneur of Thoix.

== Places of interest ==
- The fifteenth-century château.
- Saint-Etienne's fifteenth-century church
- A fifteenth-century stone cross in the square
- A dovecote in the courtyard of the farm opposite the château
- A memorial to an aerial combat between a French aeroplane and 8 German fighter planes on 5 June 1940.

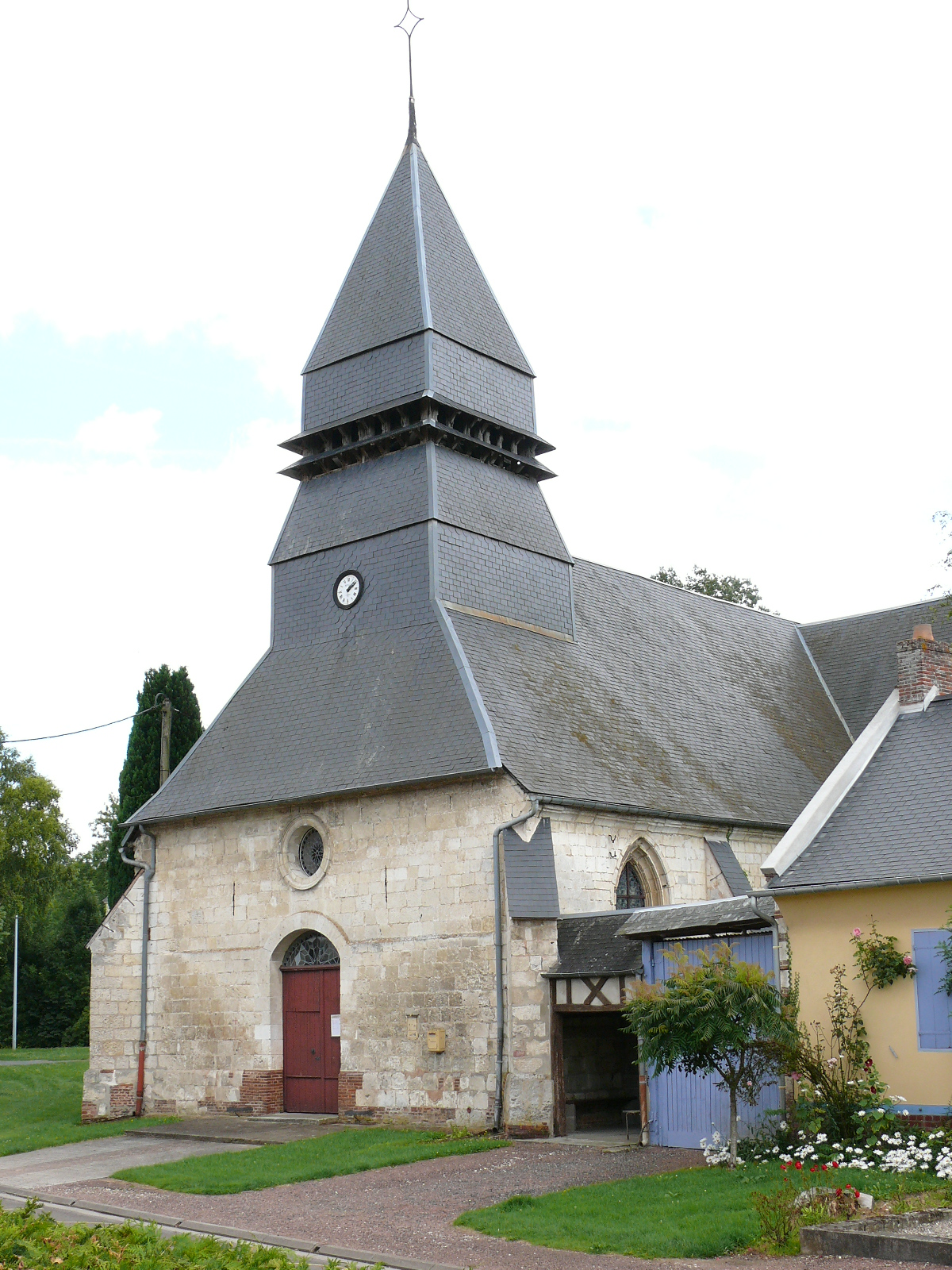
Saint-Étienne's church

== See also ==
- Communes of the Somme department
