= Darline =

Darline is a female given name. Notable people with the name include:

- Darline Graham (born 1964), American senator, sister of senator Lindsey Graham
- Darline Guest (born 1929), African American oil and acrylic painter
- Darline Nsoki (born 1989), French basketball player
- Darline Radamaker (born 1999), American-raised Haitian footballer

== See also ==
- Darlene (disambiguation)
- Darleen
