= Hôtel d'Aubière =

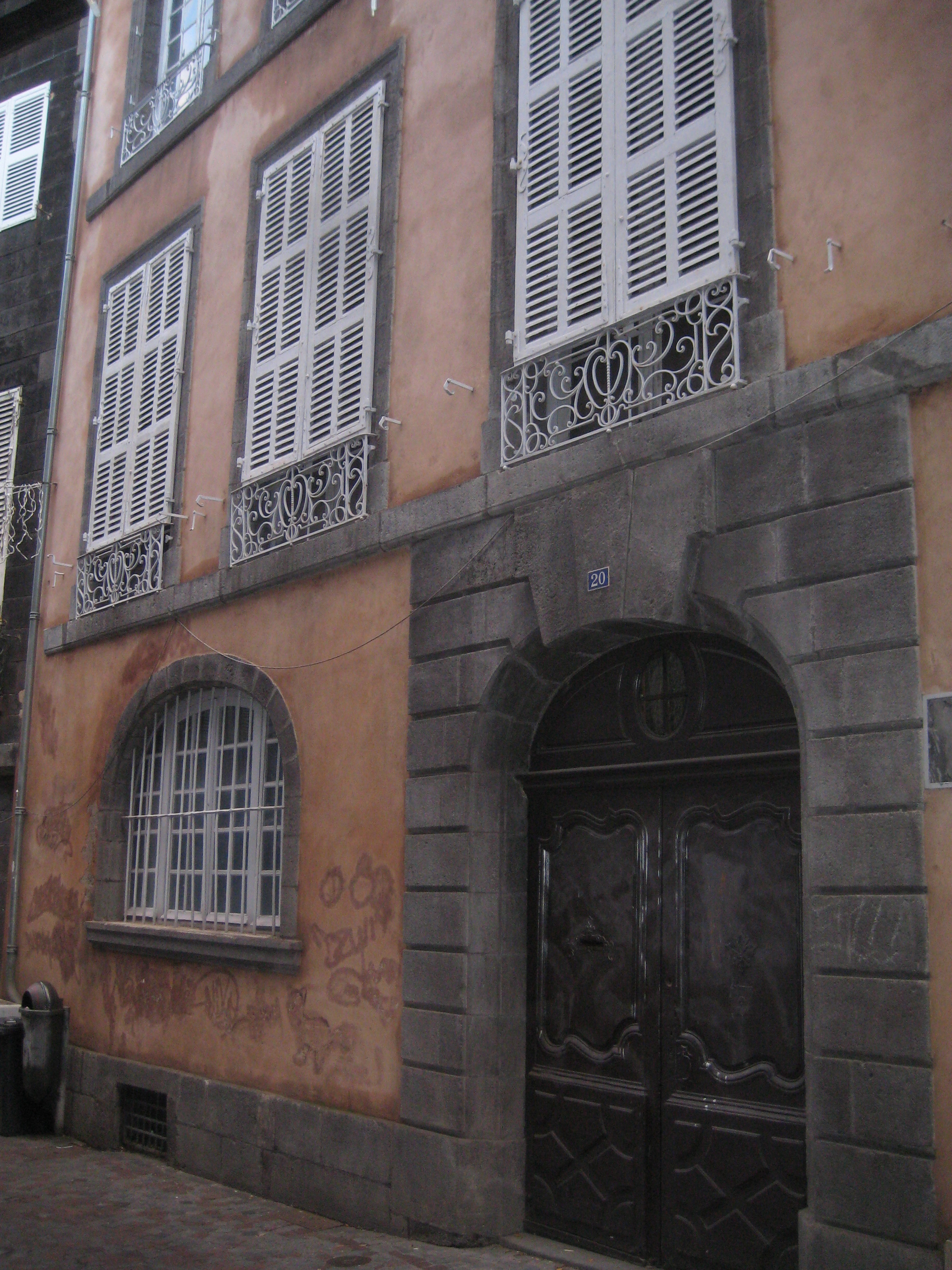
- Interactive map of the Hôtel d'Aubière area

General information
- Type: Hôtel particulier
- Location: Clermont-Ferrand, France
- Coordinates: 45°46′45″N 3°05′18″E
- Completed: 15th century; 18th century

The Hôtel d'Aubière is a historic hôtel particulier in Clermont-Ferrand, France. It was built in the 15th century, with extensions in the 18th century. It has been listed as an official historical monument since September 1, 1967.
