= Trémonteix sanctuary =

Roman temple in Auvergne-Rhône-Alpes, France

Trémonteix Sanctuary
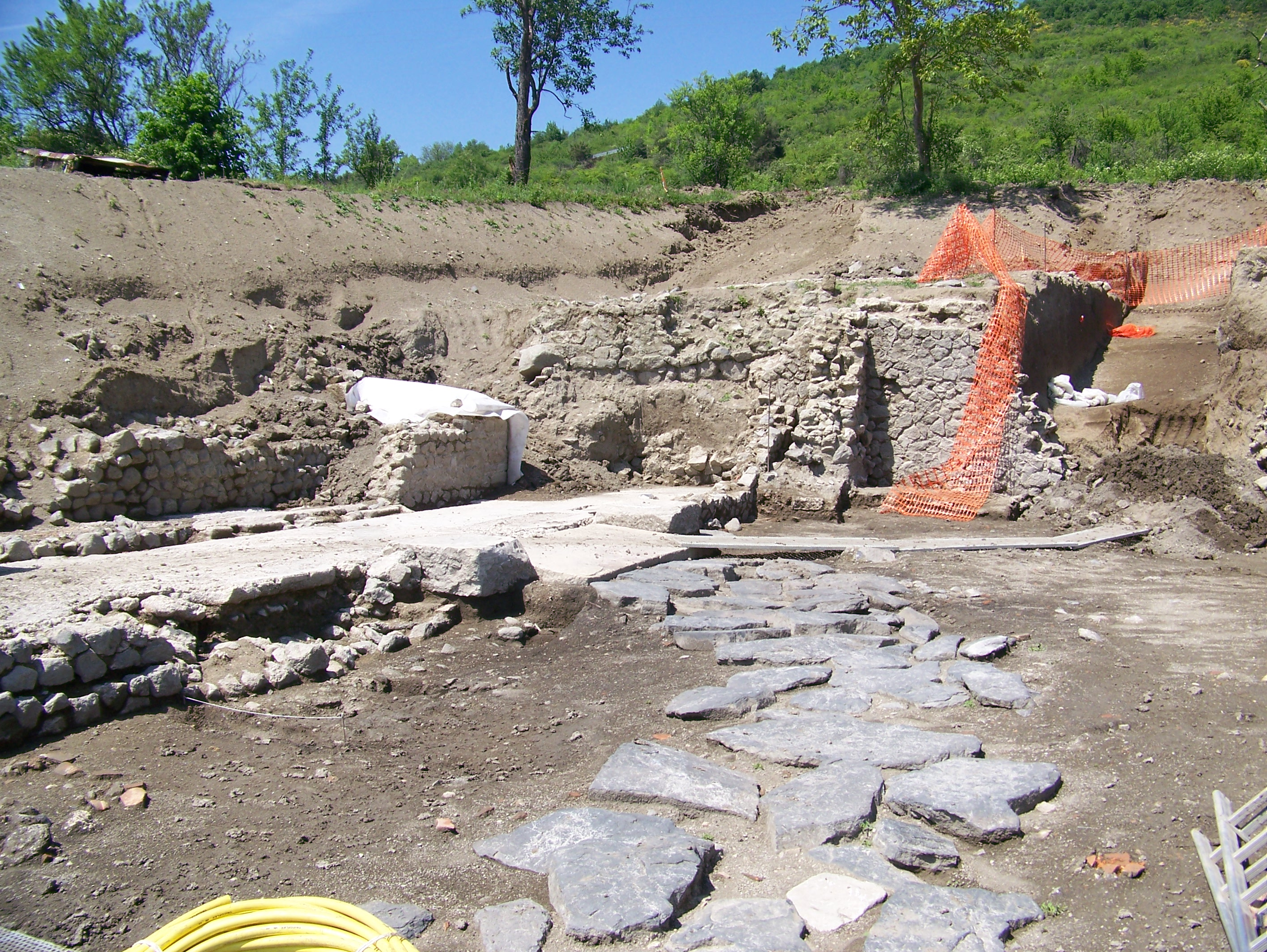
- View of the northern temple under excavation.

- Location within France Location within Auvergne-Rhône-Alpes
- 45°47′39″N 3°03′54″E
- Location: France

Site notes
- Elevation: 460 metres (1,510 ft)

Monument historique
- Ancient city: Arverni
- Current department: Puy-de-Dôme
- Current commune: Clermont-Ferrand

The Trémonteix sanctuary was a Roman sanctuary with a double fanum and a single cella linked to a Roman villa. It was built 2.5 km from the center of the ancient city of Augustonemetum/Clermont-Ferrand, France. Discovered in 2009 during a preventive archaeology study, the villa was excavated between 2010 and 2011, then partially destroyed by the subsequent development work. Only the sanctuary, listed as a historic monument in 2012, has been preserved in a green zone.

Situated at the foot of the Clermont-Ferrand hills, the archaeological site was deeply buried, ensuring its excellent preservation. Untouched by protohistoric occupation, the Trémonteix valley was developed as early as the High Empire. A first settlement, interpreted as a Roman villa, was followed by a second, built around the beginning of the 2nd century, and similarly interpreted, with a sanctuary built in a single block. The reconstruction of this settlement during the 2nd century does not seem to have led to any major reorganization of the sanctuary. However, dating the various phases of the site's occupation is complicated by the scarcity of finds, particularly ceramics, that can be used to refine the chronology of its occupation. Interpretation of the site as a villa is similarly open to debate, given the absence of any agricultural structures, with the exception of four vats whose function is uncertain.

The sanctuary occupies the northern part of the rest of the archaeological site. It is separated from the rest of the site by an enclosing wall equipped with a tower-porch, ensuring the transition between the cult space and the courtyard of the establishment. The sanctuary is located at the bottom of a slope that has been terraced to protect the site from erosion and to showcase the two temples. A number of features, including a fountain and a nymphaeum, were observed within the perimeter of the peribolos area. Both temples are centered-plan structures, with the north fanum being slightly larger than the south fanum (13 m × 9.35 m). However, only the eastern part of both fanums is known, as the rest of the area was not included in the development project and therefore not within the scope of the archaeological excavation. Although no divinity has been identified, the presence of a basin in the cella of the southern temple, the features found in the peribolos and various items of furniture indicate that this was probably a water sanctuary.

Abandoned at the end of the 4th century, the site was partially reoccupied over the following centuries, before the construction of a hamlet during the Middle Ages.

== Interventions ==
The Trémonteix archaeological site was discovered during a preventive archaeological investigation carried out by the French Institut national de recherches archéologiques préventives (Inrap) in January and February 2009, covering an area of around 16 hectares. Following this operation, a preventive excavation was ordered over a 35,000 m^{2} area and carried out by Inrap between 2010 and 2011. The area has since been developed as a 16-hectare rental district, with the exception of the sanctuary area, which was listed as a historic monument in 2012, and has been developed as a green zone. At the time of development, the Trémonteix valley was occupied by vegetable gardens and wasteland.

The area around the two temples is only partially documented, due to the limited scope of the excavation, which only allowed us to observe the eastern part of the sanctuary, i.e. around a third of the temples.

== Context ==
=== Geographic context ===
Situated at the foot of the Côtes de Clermont on an alluvial fan in a thalweg, the site has been subjected to significant sediment cover, enabling the preservation of masonry elevations up to 2.35 m high in the northern part of the site. Significant technical resources were deployed to lower the ground. The buildings were adapted to the terrain, following the direction of the slope.

The sanctuary was built some 2.5 km from the center of the ancient city of Augustonemetum, now Clermont-Ferrand. During antiquity, this town was the capital of the Roman city of the Arverni.

=== Archaeological context ===
General site plan for the second state, second phase. Documented walls Other documented structures Building footprints Restored walls Other structures restored Excavation limit

No evidence of protohistoric occupation has been found in the Trémonteix valley.

The first Roman rural settlement was composed of eleven buildings, spread over an area of 1 hectare, along a north-south axis with two alignments of buildings. The largest of the buildings, measuring around 220 m^{2}, stood at the center of this alignment. It is distinguished by a probable southern gallery and walls decorated with painted plaster, and has been identified as the residential building at the center of the estate. While most often interpreted as a Roman villa, the excavators point out that it could just as well be a "small villa or a large farm", in contrast to the settlements found on the outskirts of the Arvernian capital or in its immediate countryside. This first settlement was built in the High-Empire, around the end of the 1st century AD or the beginning of the following century, and did not extend beyond the beginning of the 2nd century, when it was almost entirely rebuilt.

At the beginning of the 2nd century, perhaps at the end of the first third of that century, the site was completely rebuilt and a second rural settlement of 6,600 m^{2} was built. The site was divided into two areas: to the north, the sanctuary proper, which appears to have been built as a single unit, and to the south, the villa courtyard, at least 98 m long, where three single-room buildings known as peripheral pavilions were found along the eastern wall. While the perimeter wall was open to the south, the two spaces were separated by a front wall featuring a porch providing a transition between the two areas. In a third phase, during the 2nd century, the courtyard was redeveloped: while the perimeter walls were preserved, the buildings along them were rebuilt with at least six pavilions whose architecture and organization were more sophisticated than in the previous phase. However, erosion makes it impossible to interpret these buildings, some of which were built side by side and some with concrete floors. With the exception of one pavilion, interpreted as a dwelling, the others are presumed to be farm buildings. During this same phase, the land to the north of the two temples was terraced to protect the site from erosion and ground pressure, and also to enhance the sanctuary. Finally, a building in the southeast corner of the sanctuary was rebuilt, adding to the complexity of the interpretation of the archaeological site. Stylistic dating of the wall plaster suggests the second half of the 1st century AD, but this is invalidated by chrono-stratigraphic data.

Because of the bipartition between pavilions in a courtyard to the south, and a less agricultural part to the north, separated from the rest of the buildings by a wall and a porch, this second settlement has also been interpreted as a villa, belonging to the category known as villas with multiple pavilions aligned, characterized by this marked bipartition between an enclosed residential part, adjoining a second enclosed part, marked by the alignment of stereotyped buildings along the two longest walls.

The site was abandoned at the end of the 4th century, but was reoccupied during the Middle Ages, in the form of a hamlet attested in 10th-century archives. The hamlet was characterized by a series of small, crude buildings with fireplaces. The medieval settlement is associated with a series of burials dated between the 5th and 9th centuries.

== The ancient sanctuary ==
Sanctuary plan for the second state, second phase. Documented walls Other structures Restored walls Excavation limit

The sanctuary is located to the north of the villa's pavilions, at the foot of the slope, which was lowered to create a flat surface. Retaining walls and terraces limited the pressure of the land towards the sanctuary.

Two temples with a centered plan (Note: While the terminology fanum is still commonly used by archaeologists, recent historiographical research shows that it is a contemporary construction linked to French archaeological research: Carpentier, Lucie (April 2, 2015). "Un axe de recherche pour l'origine des temples à plan centré en Gaule romaine: une nouvelle analyse fonctionnelle des espaces". Annales de Janua (in French) (3). ISSN 2267-1358..) were built here, as well as various other features on the peribolos. These two temples take the form of a quadrilateral corresponding to the cella where the deity resides, surrounded by a peripheral gallery of the same orientation, of a slightly higher gauge. Almost side-by-side, the two temples are separated only by a 40 cm gap designed to evacuate rainwater. The chronology of their construction is unclear, as the masonry has not been dismantled, but the two temples appear to be contemporary, having been built during the 2nd century.

== Peribolos ==
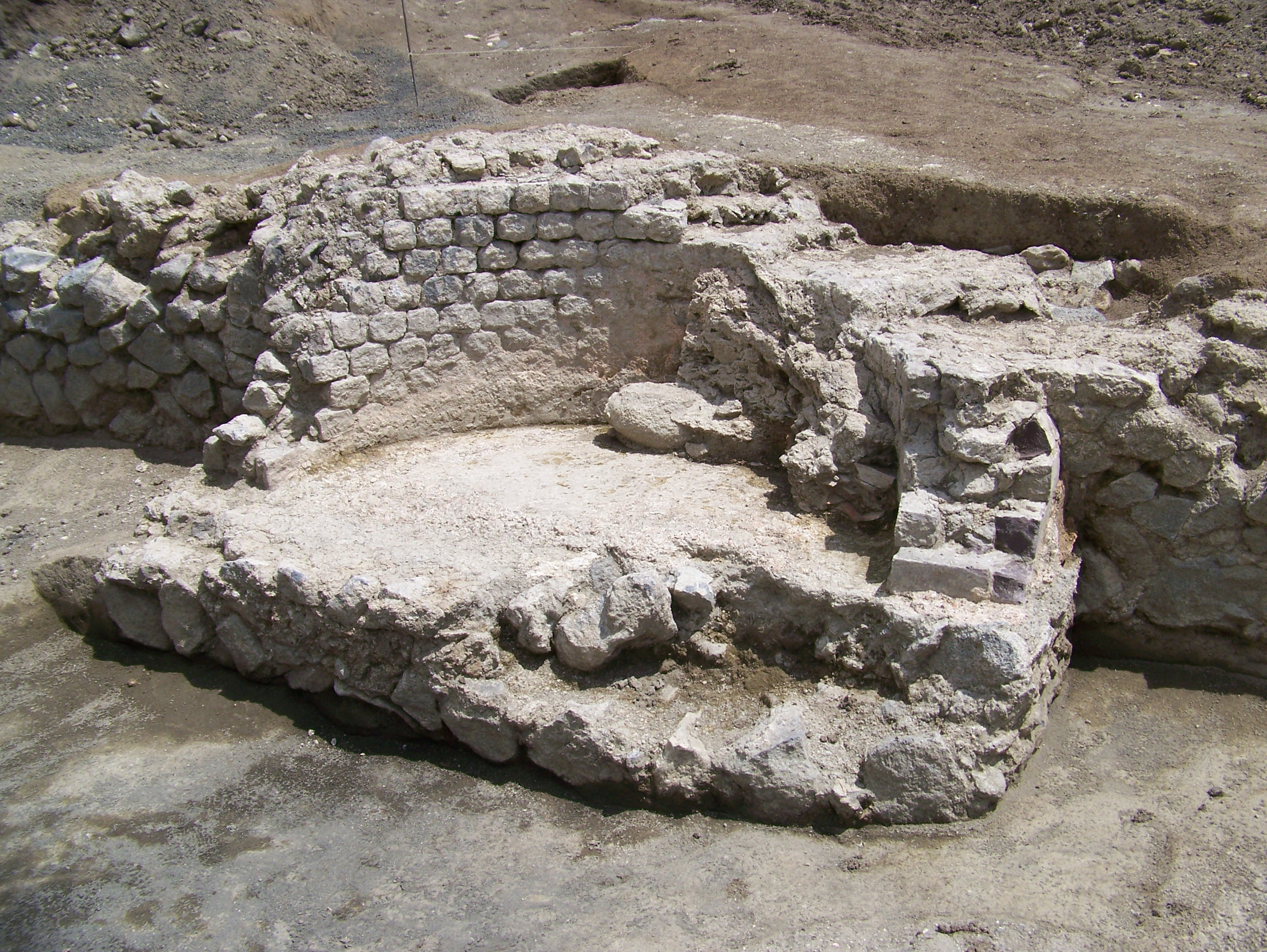
The fountain facing the entrance to the northern temple.

Only the eastern and southern parts of the peribolos around the two temples have been excavated. This is an undeveloped area where a pavement leading to the northern temple has been identified. The excavators hypothesize that the area was unfinished, with a concrete floor in particular, and that visitors passed through an area partially flooded by the discharge from a fountain with no drainage pipe, in favor of "draining the water into the open-air area".

Several structures were excavated within this perimeter: a masonry plinth possibly designed to house a statue or altar, a fountain facing the north temple, and a well accessed via an inclined plane, interpreted as a nymphaeum. Supplied with water from the west via a drain, the nymphaeum was accessible via a ramp and was fitted with a wooden casing that was not found in situ. The furnishings found during excavation included everyday items as well as religious objects (fragments of an Allier white clay statuette and an oil lamp) and game pieces. White painted plaster, embellished with red stripes, was observed on all three sides of the nymphaeum, although no hydraulic plaster was found to protect it from damp.

The fountain is the most carefully constructed structure. Overhanging the eastern perimeter wall, opposite the entrance to the northern temple, it was fed from above from the northeast of the site, thanks in particular to a small aedicula interpreted as a kind of water tower whose purpose was to channel and force the flow of water towards the fountain.

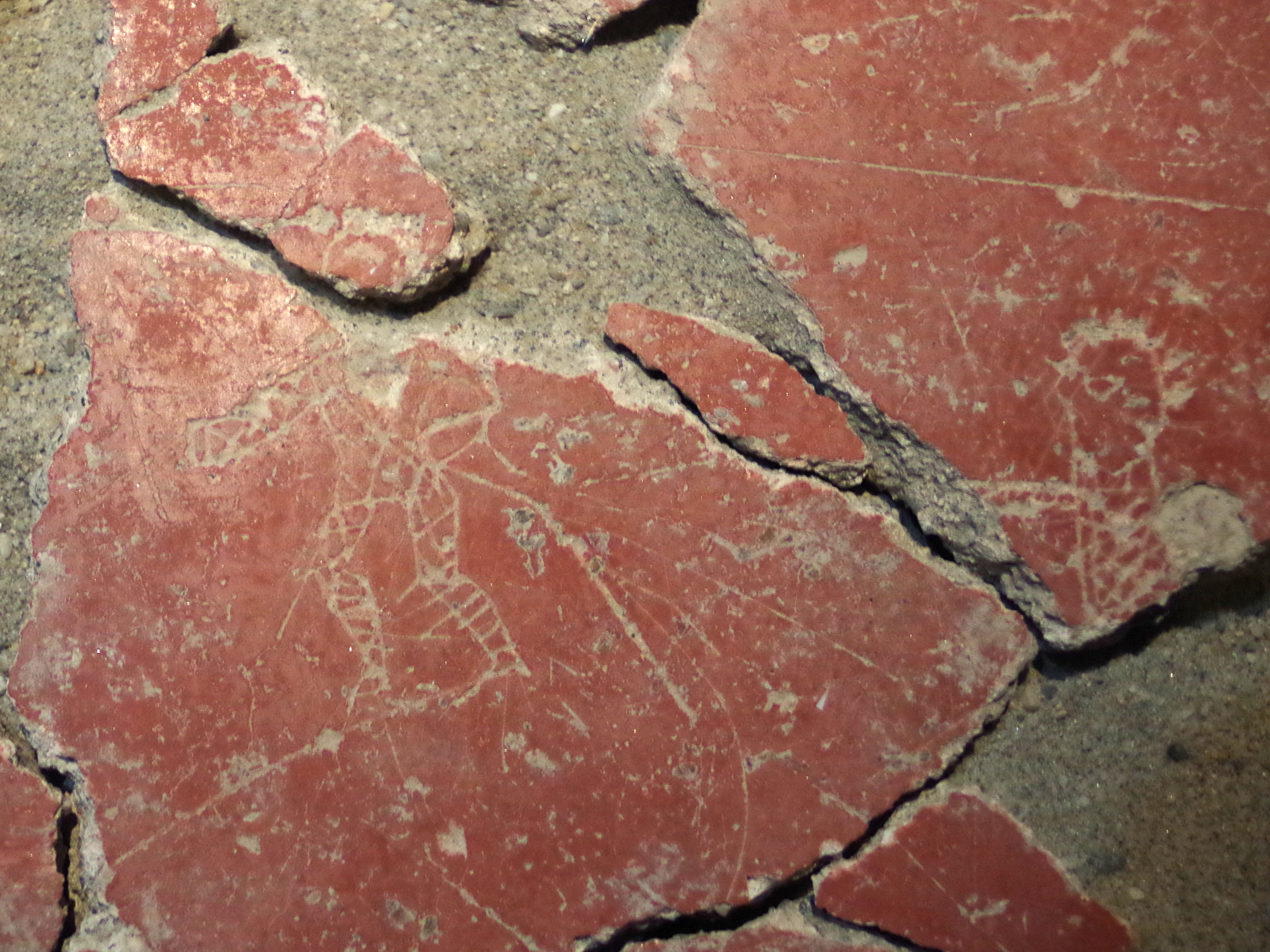
Graffiti of a gladiator on painted plaster found in building 5.

In the southeast corner of the perimeter, leaning against the dividing wall between the courtyard and the sanctuary, stands a building that underwent two phases. The function of the first building is undetermined, but its successor contains four perfectly preserved masonry vats. The southern part of the same room could have been used as a wine storehouse. The upper level, which opened directly onto the peribola, has not been preserved, but when it was destroyed, the painted plaster covering the walls collapsed to the lower level. Recomposed over a surface area of almost 5 × 2 m, the panels depict a variety of rural scenes: fruit, flowers, foliage and animals, including birds and a rooster. A Bacchic episode also appears to be depicted, while various graffiti, geometric shapes, compass exercises and figures, including a gladiator, have been identified. This was probably a ceremonial piece. The viticultural function of the vats is assumed, but not demonstrated by biomolecular analysis.

=== North temple ===
The northern temple corresponds to a single-cella temple with a central plan, whose gallery front wall is larger than that of the southern temple, measuring 13 m on each side. This second temple rests on the retaining wall to the north, and only about a third of its surface was excavated. A single opening was observed on the east side of the building, and at least part of its masonry is made of irregular rubble and ashlar quoins. The gallery had a parapet wall with clerestory and square-section pillars.

Painted plasterwork was only found in the gallery of the north temple. These included an ensemble measuring a maximum of 2.50 × 1.40 m, decorated with foliage motifs and an object reminiscent of a drinking horn. Other floral and foliage motifs were found on the other walls, while the gallery pillars were less finished, with an almost unique whitish color.

Numerous objects were found in the north temple, including a bracelet and a hairpin, while the sediment removed from the access slabs yielded a number of everyday objects that cannot be linked to cult practices.

=== South temple ===
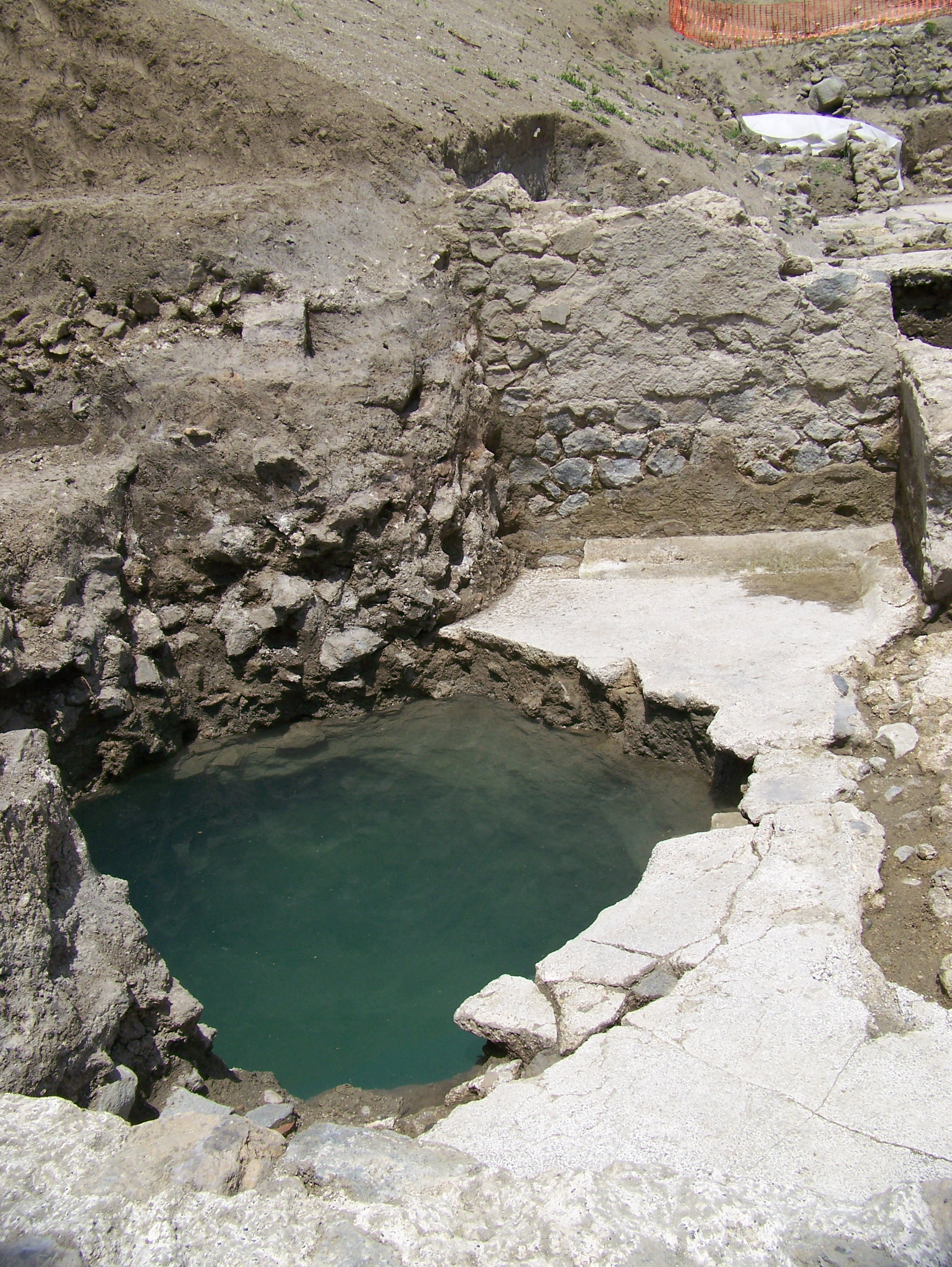
The cella basin of the southern temple. Note, on the left of the photograph, the area that was not excavated and is still occupied by sediment.

The southern temple also corresponds to a single-cella temple with a centered plan. The east-facing wall of its gallery measures 9.35 m, but it is not possible to state that the plan is perfectly square, particularly as the width of its gallery narrows to the north (1.37 m vs. 1.67 m), in contrast to the other temple; an estimate of the surface area of its cella is 21 m^{2}. Two openings provide access to this temple: the main one to the east, heavily disrupted by salvaging, and another in the southeast corner, the latter having been belatedly filled in. The north façade of the gallery, which supports the roof with plastered columns, was completely open, unlike the east and south façades, which were equipped with parapet walls with clerestory.

On the north side of the gallery, the faceted columns, made of quarter-and-half rounds of brick forming a fifteen-faceted profile, were plastered in a plain, whitish color, with a small polychrome frieze of geometric decoration 12.5 cm from the top of the columns. Although rarely attested in Gaul, this type of decoration was probably common. The parapet walls showed little in the way of white plaster flecked with red and black. In the cella, a few very fragmentary slabs reveal floral decoration.

The cella is entirely occupied by a basin fed by an underground spring and by two draining trenches. The absence of a wall and the discovery of planks suggest that the basin was lined with wood. While two drainage trenches completed the supply of this naturally occurring spring, an overflow drain led the water outside the sanctuary, towards the south. This drain was redesigned during the third phase, when the building housing the tanks was rebuilt.

=== A water sanctuary ===
While the presence of a Bacchic episode could provide a clue as to the deity honored in this sanctuary, Julien Boislève points out that this shortcut is too quick given the banality of this iconographic scheme. The presence of the pool in the southern temple, as well as a fountain and a nymphaeum, suggest that a water sanctuary is the most likely hypothesis. In the sanctuary's worship circuit, the nymphaeum's modesty nevertheless seems to indicate that it played a minor role, perhaps to the benefit of the fountain located in front of the northern temple.

Specialized studies of numismatics and glass furnishings seem to support this hypothesis. Indeed, more than half of the coins discovered during the excavation came from the cult area (105 out of 179). Of these, 72 were found in the north temple and 33 in the south temple. While those from the northern temple are more likely to be 2nd-century coins, those from the southern temple were mostly minted during the High-Empire. Nevertheless, all are common coins and several were found in positions that suggest ritual use, for example between the basalt slabs that led to the northern temple. The association of coins and hydraulic structures also seems to testify to iactatio stipis rites, which involved the throwing of coins. Only one late coin, a small unidentified Byzantine bronze, stands out from the rest. As for the glass vessels, they are mostly drinking vessels, goblets including a rare ovoid, "which suggests its association with the cultic activities carried out in the vicinity of the nymphaeum", and jugs/bottles. Although the small size of the corpus and its fragmentary aspect make it impossible to be conclusive, certain fragments do seem to be linked to this probable water sanctuary.

== Interpretation ==
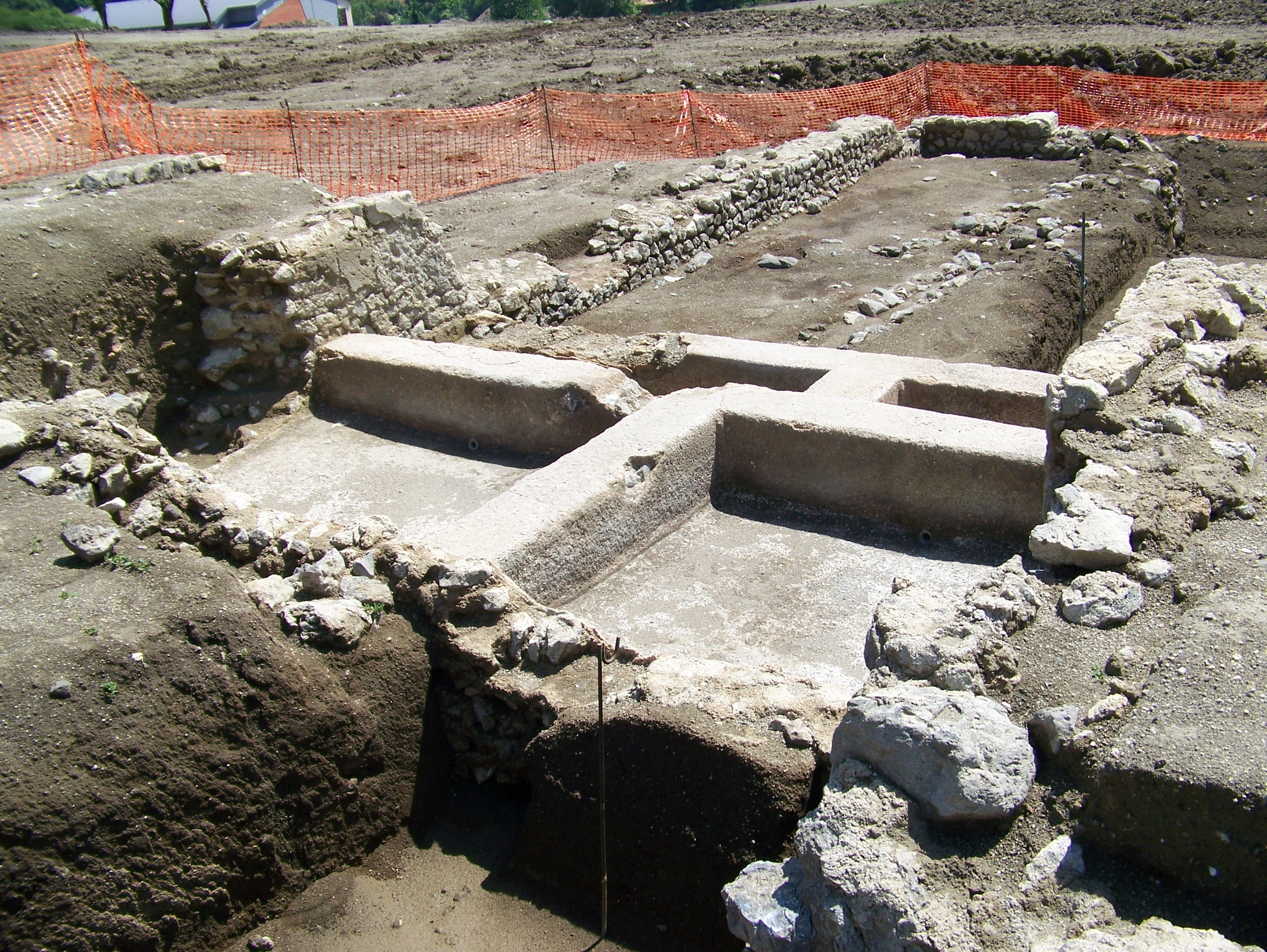
The villa's four tanks, the only identified production sites on the site.

The presence of a sanctuary associated with pavilions, following the model of aligned multi-pavilion villas, supports the hypothesis of an interpretation as a rural settlement, which is also supported by the presence of four masonry vats. However, their agricultural vocation is uncertain, and biomolecular analyses have not been able to isolate the markers of a wine or olive-growing activity.

The absence of a recognized residential part, following the traditional bipartition of villas into residential and agricultural parts, is questionable, as is the site's proximity to the center of the Augustonemetum agglomeration. However, the person in charge of the operation interprets the site as a sanctuary associated with a villa, the residential part of which must have been located nearby, perhaps to the south of the diagnosed and excavated right-of-way.

The status of the site, between a potentially private reception area with the room above the vats, and a cult space possibly open to a wider public, remains undetermined. The status of its owners is also unknown, in the absence of any epigraphic inscription linking it to a notable, for example. The vat house has yielded several graffiti that are difficult to interpret, only one of which has been read AENIV[.] and hypothetically associated with an Aelianus known elsewhere, whose status is however unknown.

== Bibliography ==
- Boislève, Julien (2014). "Le décor peint du sanctuaire de Trémonteix (Puy-de-Dôme)". In Musée Argentomagus (ed.). Dieux merci ! Sanctuaires, dévots et offrandes en Gaule romaine. Saint-Marcel. pp. 36–37. ISBN 978-2-909184-32-6.
- Boislève, Julien; Chuniaud, Kristell (2014). "Les peintures du sanctuaire de Trémonteix à Clermont-Ferrand (Puy-de-Dôme)". Peintures murales et stucs d'époque romaine. Révéler l'architecture par l'étude du décor (in French). Bordeaux: Ausonius. pp. 157–177. ISBN 978-2-35613-122-5.
- Chuniaud, Kristell (2011). "Puy-de-Dôme. Clermont-Ferrand. L'occupation antique et le sanctuaire domanial de Trémonteix". L'Archéologue (115): 4–5. ISSN 1255-5932.
- Chuniaud, Kristell (2012). Mille ans d'histoire aux portes de Clermont-Ferrand: carnet de fouille archéologique à Trémonteix (in French). Clermont-Ferrand: Reflets d'ailleurs. ISBN 978-2-918593-24-9.
- Dartevelle, Hélène (2021). Augustonemetum. Atlas topographique de Clermont-Ferrand (in French). Gollion: Infolio. ISBN 978-2-88474-415-7.
- Dartevelle, Hélène (2021). Augustonemetum. Atlas topographique de Clermont-Ferrand. Histoire et archéologie (in French). Gollion: Infolio. ISBN 978-2-88474-415-7.
- Chuniaud, Kristell (2021). "Feuille 48. Trémonteix". Augustonemetum. Atlas topographique de Clermont-Ferrand (in French). Vol. 2. pp. 247–254.
- Raux, Stéphanie; Chuniaud, Kristell; Geneviève, Vincent; Simon, Laure (2019). "Des rites de iactatio stipis et de consommation des liquides mis en évidence par les mobiliers sur le sanctuaire antique de Trémonteix à Clermont-Ferrand (Puy-de-Dôme, FR)". Mobiliers et sanctuaires dans les provinces romaines occidentales (fin du Ier s. av.-Ve s. ap. J.-C.). La place des productions manufacturées dans les espaces sacrés et dans les pratiques religieuses. Drémil-Lafarge: Mergoil. pp. 163–187. ISBN 978-2-35518-093-4.
