= Jaude Centre =

Shopping mall in Clermont-Ferrand, France

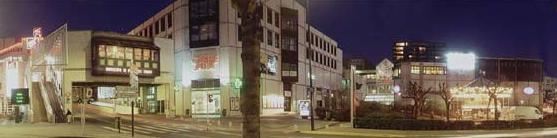
- Jaude Centre
- Location: Clermont-Ferrand (Puy-de-Dôme), France
- Coordinates: 45.7745°N 3.0838°E
- Address: 18 rue d'Allagnat 63000
- Architect: Jean-Loup Roubert

Jaude Centre is one of the most prominent shopping malls in Clermont-Ferrand, France. It is located in extreme south-East in the Jaude Square, in the city centre.

== History ==
In 1960, the local council wanted to refurbish the district called “fond de Jaude” to build a shopping mall, housing and offices. This quarter was unhealthy and particularly depreciated. It was destroyed and the construction work for the shopping mall started at the end of 1978. The shops opened their doors on September 11 of 1980.

== Architecture ==
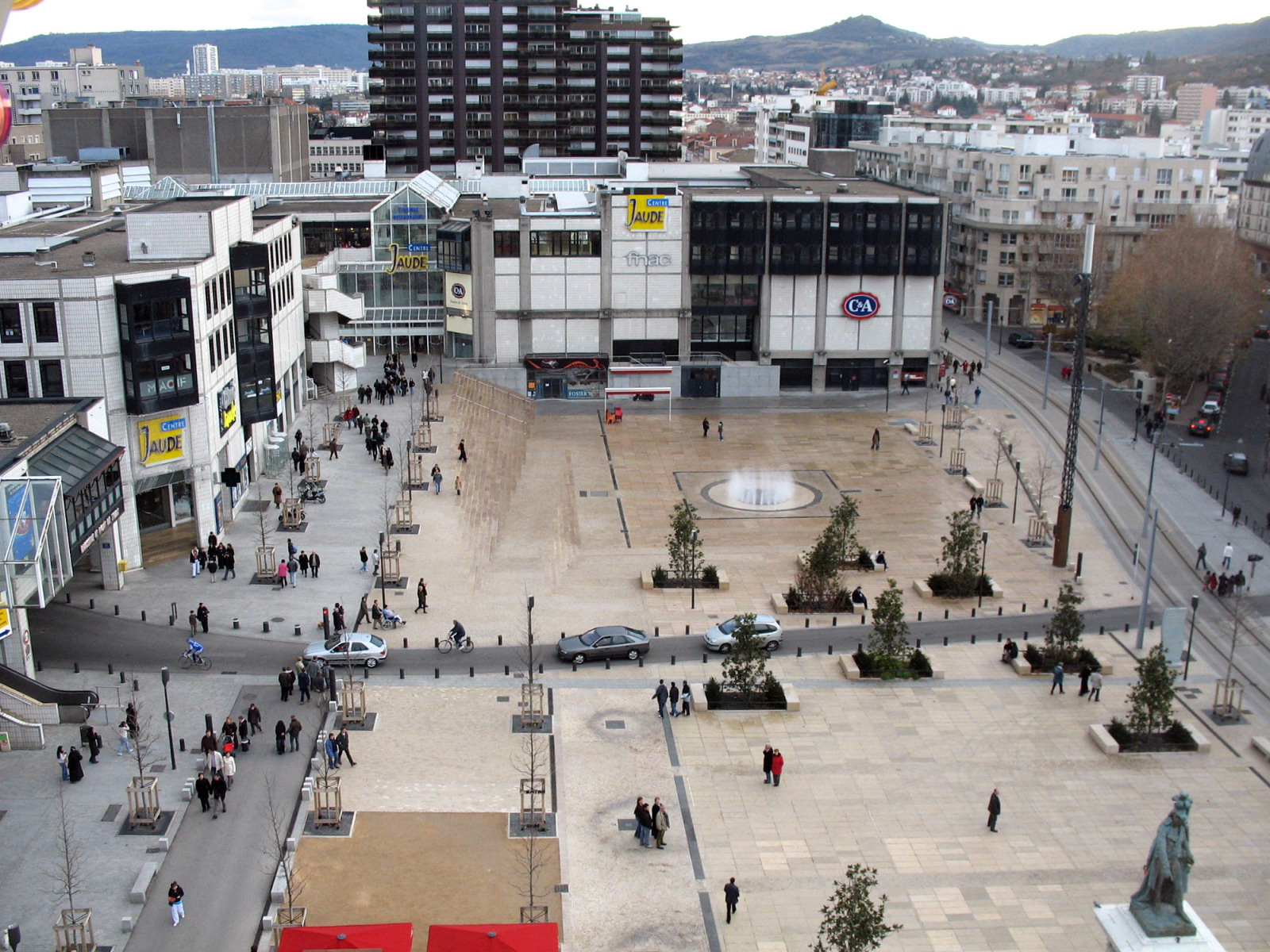
Jaude Centre in 2007

Centre Jaude was designed by the architect Jean-Loup Roubert. The building is mostly made of concrete. At the top of it and to light up the different spaces where people walk there is a glass roof.

Since its construction, the building was modified. The changes include:

• The addition of a new storey, which is now used by the shop Fnac and its bookshop department. • During 2008 a further extension was added which represents 500 square meters of retail space. The exterior facades opening onto Jaude square were partly renovated with the addition of window pane on top of the white panes which did not receive a good support from the public and were often criticized since the shopping mall's opening.

== Importance ==
Jaude Centre is composed of a shopping arcade on three storeys, representing 22646 square meters and eighty shops. In 2005, it was ranked the fifth national commercial surface for the amount of money spent per square meter. The influence of the Centre Jaude is not only measurable for the city of Clermont-Ferrand but for the entire region because of the lack of other commercial centres in the area. Indeed, Centre Jaude received 6 million visitors each year from the four departments of Auvergne.

== Present shops ==
Sizes of the biggest shops:

• C&A (4 300 square metres),
• The Fnac (2 200 square metres),
• Go Sport (1 150 square metres),
• Habitat (950 square metres),
• Cinemas, Ciné Alpes (Ciné Jaude 2000 square metres) : a seven-screen cinema.

Some of the other brands which are present: “Nature et Découvertes, Burton, Sephora, Etam, Jules, Courir, Pimkie, Zara, Lush.” Centre Jaude is a mall of culture, leisure, gifts and fashion. The third storey offers some pancake restaurants, pizzeria, brasserie, cafeteria and other fast food restaurants. There is also a baker's store and cake store on the ground floor.
