= Dumaniant =

French comedian and playwright

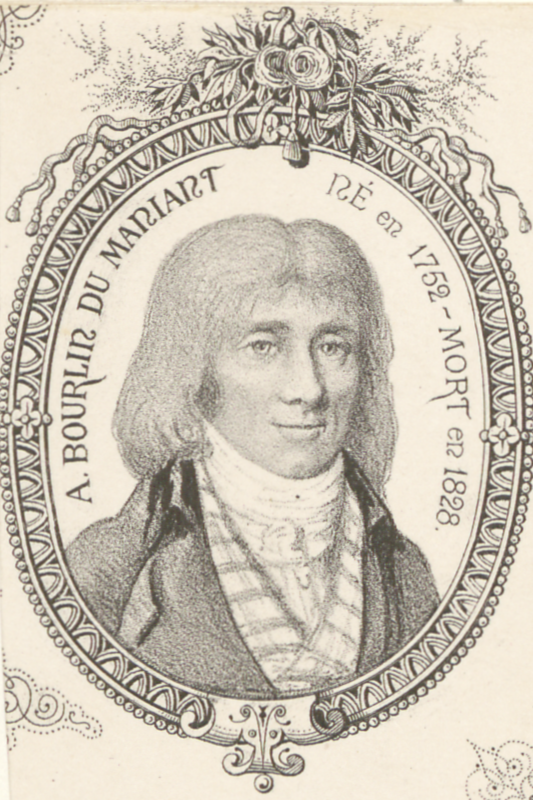
- An 1878 lithograph of Dumaniant
- Born: Antoine-Jean Bourlin; 11 April 1752; Clermont-Ferrand, France
- Died: 26 September 1828 (aged 76); Paris, France
- Occupations: Actor playwright goguettier

Antoine-Jean Bourlin, better known as Dumaniant, (11 April 1752 – 26 September 1828) was a French comedian, playwright and goguettier.

First a lawyer, he was a comedian in Paris until 1798, then patented entrepreneur of shows in the province.

In 1802, he was a member of the Parisian goguette Déjeuners des Garçons de bonne humeur

== Works ==
Theatre

- Le Médecin malgré tout le monde, three-act comedy, in prose, Paris, Théâtre du Palais-Royal, 20 February 1786
- Le Dragon de Thionville, historical fact in 1 act and in prose, Théâtre du Palais-Royal, 26 July 1786
- Guerre ouverte, ou Ruse contre ruse, comedy in 3 acts and in prose, Théâtre du Palais-Royal, 4 October 1786
- La Nuit aux avantures, comedy in 3 acts and in prose, Théâtre du Palais-Royal, 7 February 1787
- Les Intrigants, ou Assaut de fourberies, comedy in 3 acts and in prose, Théâtre du Palais-Royal, 6 August 1787
- La Belle Esclave, ou Valcour et Zéïla, comedy in 1 act and in prose, mingled with ariettes, music by Philidor, Paris, Théâtre des Petits Comédiens de Mgr le Comte de Beaujolais, 18 September 1787
- L'Amant femme-de-chambre, comedy in 1 act and in prose, Théâtre du Palais-Royal, 8 November 1787
- La Loi de Jatab, ou le Turc à Paris, one-act comedy in verse, Théâtre du Palais-Royal, 1787
- Urbélise et Lanval, ou la Journée aux aventures, three-act comédie-féerie in prose, Théâtre du Palais-Royal, 30 April 1788.
- Les Deux cousins, ou les Français à Séville, three-act comedy, in prose, Théâtre du Palais-Royal, 22 July 1788
- L'Honnête homme, ou le Rival généreux, comedy in 3 acts and in verse, Théâtre du Palais-Royal, 5 February 1789
- Le Secret découvert, ou l'Arrivée du maître, comedy in 1 act and in prose, Versailles, Théâtre Montansier, 24 February 1789
- Ricco, comedy in 2 acts and in prose, Théâtre du Palais-Royal, 26 November 1789
- La Double Intrigue, ou l'Aventure embarrassante, comedy in 2 acts and in prose, Théâtre du Palais-Royal, 10 July 1790
- La Vengeance, tragedy in 5 acts and in verse, Paris, Théâtre-Français, 26 November 1791 Text online
- La Journée difficile, ou les Femmes rusées, comedy in 3 acts and in prose, Paris, Théâtre des Variétés, 19 November 1792 Text online
- Beaucoup de bruit pour rien, comedy in 3 acts and in prose, imitated from Calderon, Théâtre des Variétés, 25 February 1793
- Isaure et Gernance, ou les Réfugiés religionnaires, comedy in 3 acts, in prose, Paris, Théâtre de la Cité, 6 November 1794
- Les Ruses déjouées, three-act comedy in prose, Théâtre de la Cité-Variétés, 14 November 1798
- Le Duel de Bambin, one-act comedy in prose, mingled with ariettes, music by citizen Tomeoni, Paris, Théâtre Montansier, 20 June 1800
- Les Calvinistes, ou Villars à Nîmes, one-act historical comedy, in prose, with Pigault-Lebrun, Paris, Théâtre Français de la République, 29 December 1800
- Henri et Perrine, comedy in 1 act and in prose, imitated from Danish, Paris, Théâtre de l'Ambigu-Comique, 5 February 1801
- L'Hermite de Saverne, tableau en mélodrame des mœurs du XIVe siècle, in 3 acts, in prose, with Thuring, music by Louis Alexandre Piccinni, Paris, Théâtre de la Porte-Saint-Martin, 16 June 1803
- Brisquet et Jolicœur, one-act comédie-vaudeville, with Servière, Paris, Théâtre Montansier, 22 January 1804
- Soyez plutôt maçon, one-act comedy, in prose, Théâtre de la Porte-Saint-Martin, 2 April 1804
- Les Français en Alger, two-act melodrama, in prose, music by Alexandre Piccinni fils, Théâtre de la Porte-Saint-Martin, 28 April 1804
- L'Adroite ingénue, ou la Porte secrète, comedy in 3 acts in verse, imitated from Calderon, with Marc-Antoine Désaugiers, Théâtre de la Porte-Saint-Martin, 3 September 1805
- L'Espiègle et le dormeur, ou le Revenant du château de Beausol, comedy in 3 acts and in prose, imitated from German, Paris, Théâtre de l'Impératrice, 28 June 1806
- L'Homme en deuil de lui-même, comedy in 1 act and in prose, with Charles Henrion, Paris, Théâtre de l'Impératrice, 15 August 1806
- La Famille des badauds, one-act comedy, imitated from English, Paris, Théâtre des Variétés-Étrangères, 7 March 1807
- L'Hôtelier de Milan, three-act comedy, imitated from the Spaniard Antonio de Solis, Théâtre des Variétés-Étrangères, 5 June 1807
- Les Folles raisonnables, two-act comedies, imitated from English by George Farquhar [The Inconstant], Théâtre des Variétés-Étrangères, 13 June 1807
- Grotius, ou le fort de Loevesteen, three-act historical melodrama extravaganza, music by Quaisain, Paris, Théâtre de l'Ambigu-Comique, 20 March 1810
- La Femme de 20 ans, comedy in 3 acts and in verse, Théâtre de l'Impératrice, 22 October 1811
- Qui des deux a raison ? ou la Leçon de danse, comedy in 1 act and in verse, Théâtre de l'Impératrice, 28 September 1813

Varia

- 1797: Les Amours et aventures d'un émigré
- 1804: Herclès, poème en 3 chants, suivi de la Création de la femme
- 1811: Trois mois de ma vie, ou l'Histoire de ma famille (3 volumes)
- 1813: Des Moyens de prévenir la décadence de l'art du comédien et d'assurer le sort de ceux qui exercent cet art
- 1823: De la situation des théâtres dans les départements
