= Vincent Cé Ougna =

French footballer (born 1985)

Personal information
- Date of birth: 3 October 1985 (age 41)
- Place of birth: Clermont-Ferrand, France
- Height: 1.74 m (5 ft 9 in)
- Position: Striker

Senior career*
Years	Team	Apps	(Gls)
2003–2006	Clermont	2	(0)
2006–2008	Montluçon	40	(2)
2008–2010	Yzeure	56	(16)
2010–2011	Luzenac	32	(2)
2011–2012	Red Star	13	(0)
2012–2017	Yzeure	78	(6)
Total		221	(26)
- * Club domestic league appearances and goals

Vincent Cé Ougna (born 3 October 1985) is a French former professional footballer who played as a striker.

He played on the professional level in Ligue 2 for Clermont Foot.

== Bibliography ==
- Vincent Cé Ougna profile at foot-national.com
