= John F. Sweets =

American historian

John F. Sweets is an American historian of modern French history specializing in the Vichy France era, the French Resistance, and occupied France.

== Early life ==
John F. Sweets graduated from Florida State University. He earned his Ph.D. from Duke University in 1972.

== Career ==
Sweets has taught at the University of Kansas since 1972.

Sweets is the author of Choices in Vichy France, which explores popular French attitudes towards the Vichy government, the French Resistance and the German occupation during World War II. His earlier work, The Politics of Resistance in France, 1940-1944, was the "first account in English of the political evolution within the Resistance that enabled it to overcome internal strife" and form an effective underground movement.

== Publications ==
- The Politics of Resistance in France, 1940-1944: A History of the Mouvements unis de la Résistance, (Dekalb, 1976)
- Choices in Vichy France: the French Under Nazi Occupation, (New York, 1986), translated into French as Clermont-Ferrand à l’heure allemande, (Paris, 1986)
