= Prouzel =

- Commune
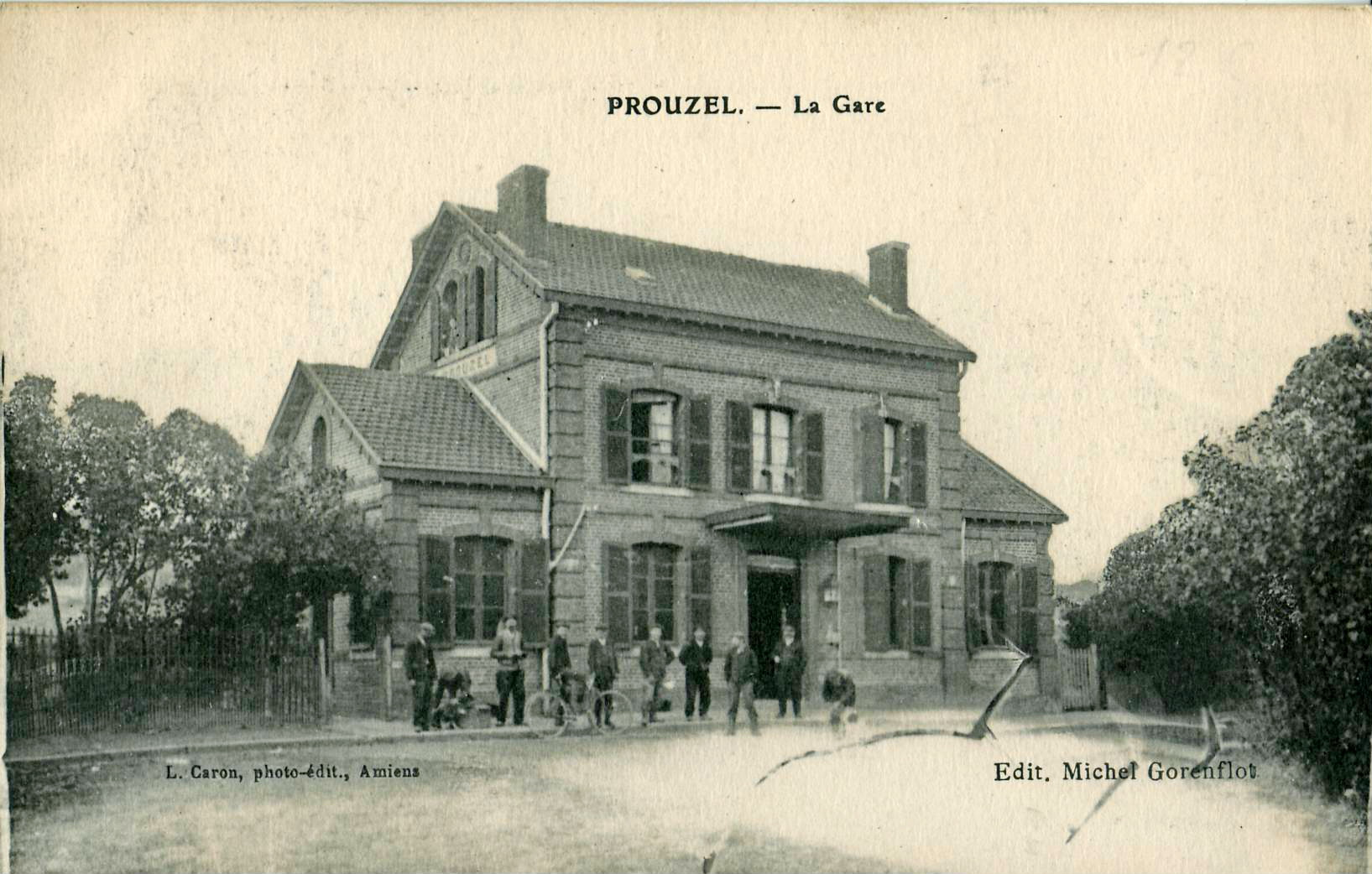
- The railway station in Prouzel
- Location of Prouzel
- Location within France Location within Hauts-de-France
- Coordinates: 49°48′59″N 2°12′15″E
- Country: France
- Region: Hauts-de-France
- Department: Somme
- Arrondissement: Amiens
- Canton: Ailly-sur-Noye
- Intercommunality: CC Somme Sud-Ouest

Government
  - Mayor (2022–2026): Nathalie Pizzaferri
- Area^{1}: 5.19 km^{2} (2.00 sq mi)
- Elevation: 42 m (138 ft)
- Highest elevation: 129 m (423 ft)
- Lowest elevation: 38 m (125 ft)
- Population (2023): 572
  - Density: 110/km^{2} (285/sq mi)
- Time zone: UTC+01:00 (CET)
  - Summer (DST): UTC+02:00 (CEST)
- INSEE/Postal code: 80643 /80160
- ^{1} French Land Register data, which excludes lakes, ponds, glaciers > 1 km^{2} (0.386 sq mi or 247 acres) and river estuaries.

Prouzel (French pronunciation: [pʁuzɛl]) is a commune in the Somme department in Hauts-de-France in northern France.

== Geography ==
Prouzel is situated on the D8b road, some 7 miles (11 km) southwest of Amiens, near the banks of the river Selle.

== Population ==
Historical population
Year	Pop.	±% p.a.
1968	352	—
1975	384	+1.25%
1982	399	+0.55%
1990	502	+2.91%
1999	503	+0.02%
2007	492	−0.28%
2012	473	−0.78%
2017	552	+3.14%
2023	572	+0.59%
Source: INSEE

== Places of interest ==
- Sixteenth-century church of Notre-Dame de la Nativité, with baptismal fonts from the twelfth century
- 17th-century château
- The ‘Coulée verte’ (en: ’Green Trail’). When the local railway closed in 1939, the derelict line was eventually converted into a pleasant nature trail.
- 18th-century pigeon house

== Personalities ==
Gabriel Ferez, a student from Prouzel, was murdered in south London in June 2008.

== See also ==
- Communes of the Somme department
