= Clermont-Ferrand =

Clermont-Ferrand Clarmont-Ferrand (Occitan)
- Prefecture and commune
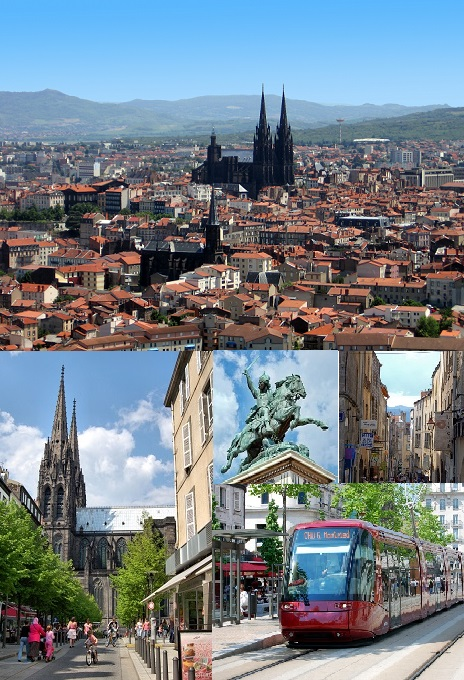
- Photomontage: view of the historic center from Montjuzet Park (top); Victoire Square and Notre-Dame-de-l'Assomption Cathedral; Statue of Vercingétorix; and Chaussetiers Street (middle); Basilica of Notre-Dame du Port (bottom)

- Flag Coat of arms
- Location of Clermont-Ferrand
- Location within France Location within Auvergne-Rhône-Alpes
- Coordinates: 45°46′59″N 3°04′57″E
- Country: France
- Region: Auvergne-Rhône-Alpes
- Department: Puy-de-Dôme
- Arrondissement: Clermont-Ferrand
- Canton: 6 cantons
- Intercommunality: Clermont Auvergne Métropole

Government
  - Mayor (2026–32): Julien Bony
- Area^{1}: 42.67 km^{2} (16.47 sq mi)
  - Urban (2020): 181 km^{2} (70 sq mi)
  - Metro (2020): 2,845 km^{2} (1,098 sq mi)
- Elevation: 358 m (1,175 ft)
- Highest elevation: 602 m (1,975 ft)
- Lowest elevation: 321 m (1,053 ft)
- Population (2023): 146,351
  - Density: 3,430/km^{2} (8,883/sq mi)
  - Urban (2023): 272,529
  - Urban density: 1,510/km^{2} (3,900/sq mi)
  - Metro (2023): 510,685
  - Metro density: 179.5/km^{2} (464.9/sq mi)
- Demonym: Clermontois
- Time zone: UTC+01:00 (CET)
  - Summer (DST): UTC+02:00 (CEST)
- INSEE/Postal code: 63113 /63000-63100
- Website: clermont-ferrand.fr
- ^{1} French Land Register data, which excludes lakes, ponds, glaciers > 1 km^{2} (0.386 sq mi or 247 acres) and river estuaries.

Clermont-Ferrand (Note: UK: /ˌklɛərmɒ̃ fɛˈrɒ̃/; US: /-moʊn -/; French: [klɛʁmɔ̃ fɛʁɑ̃]; Auvergnat: Clarmont-Ferrand or simply Clarmont [çɒʁˈmu]) is a city and commune of France, in the Auvergne-Rhône-Alpes region, with a population of 146,351 (2023). Its metropolitan area (aire d'attraction) had 510,685 inhabitants in 2023. It is the prefecture (capital) of the Puy-de-Dôme département. Julien Bony is its current mayor.

Clermont-Ferrand sits on the plain of Limagne in the Massif Central and is surrounded by a major industrial area. The city is known for the chain of volcanoes, the Chaîne des Puys, which surround it. This includes the dormant volcano Puy de Dôme, 10 kilometres (6 miles) away, one of the highest in the surrounding area, which is topped by communications towers and visible from the city. Clermont-Ferrand has been listed as a "tectonic hotspot" since July 2018 on the UNESCO World Heritage List.

One of the oldest French cities, it was known by the Romans in the first century as the capital of the Arvernie tribe before developing in the Gallo-Roman era under the name of Augustonemetum in the 1st century BC. The forum of the Roman city was located on the top of the Clermont mound, on the site of the present cathedral. During the decline of the Western Roman Empire it was subjected to repeated looting by the peoples who invaded Gaul, including Vandals, Alans, Visigoths and Franks. It was later raided by Vikings in the ninth and tenth century AD as the Carolingian Empire weakened in the early Middle Ages. Growing in importance under the Capetian dynasty, in 1095 it hosted the Council of Clermont, where Pope Urban II called the First Crusade. In 1551, Clermont became a royal town, and was declared an inseparable property of the Crown in 1610.

Today Clermont-Ferrand hosts the Clermont-Ferrand International Short Film Festival (Festival du Court-Métrage de Clermont-Ferrand), one of the world's leading festivals for short films. It is also home to the corporate headquarters of Michelin, the global tyre company founded in the city more than 100 years ago. With a quarter of the municipal population being students, and some 6,000 researchers, Clermont-Ferrand is the first city in France to join the UNESCO Learning City Network .

Among the many notable landmarks in Clermont-Ferrand are the black lava-stone Gothic Cathedral and the Place de Jaude with an equestrian statue of Vercingetorix made by Frédéric Bartholdi, surmounting the words inscribed in French "J'ai pris les armes pour la liberte de tous" ("I took up arms for the liberty of all").

== History ==
=== Name ===
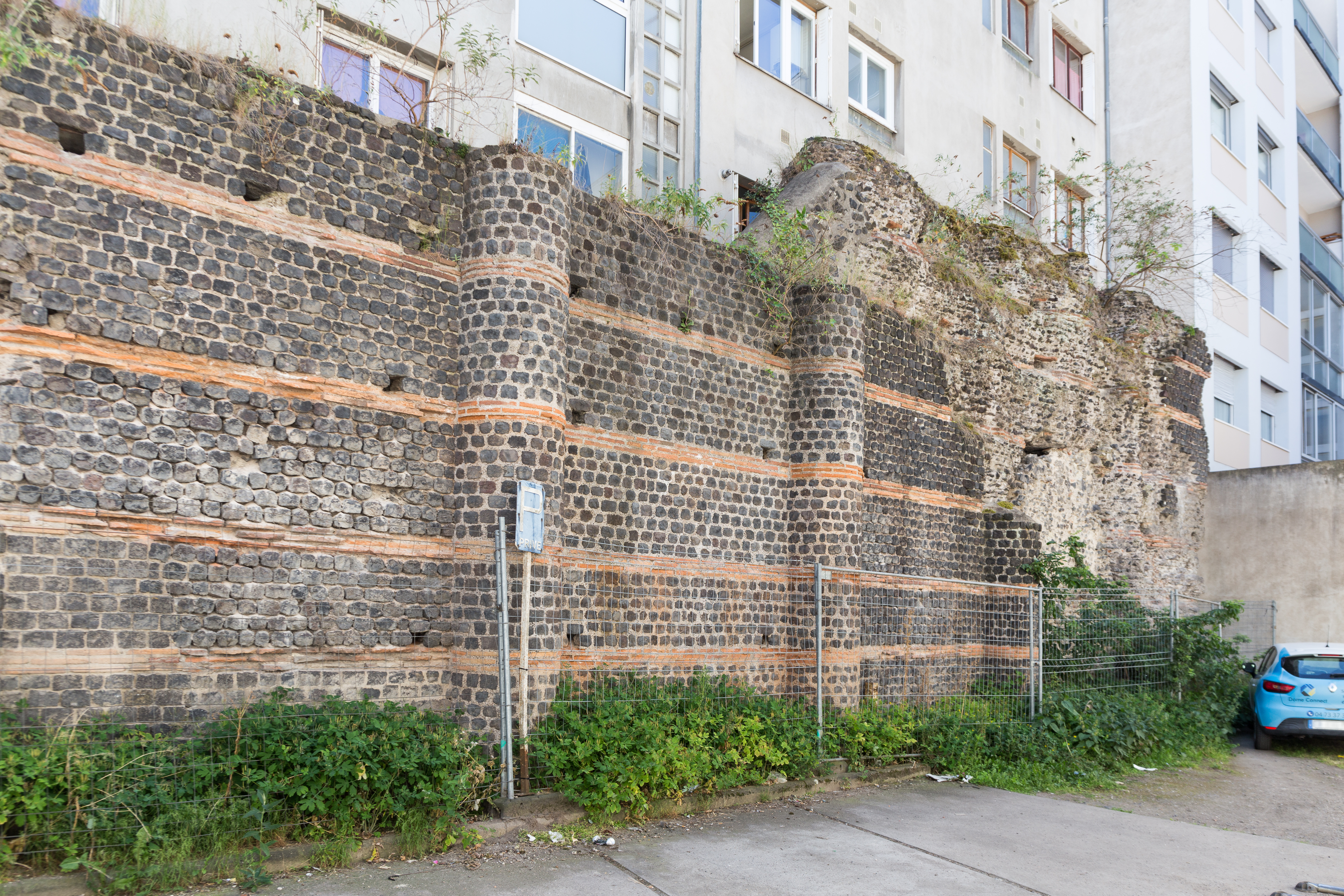
Only remaining Gallo-Roman wall of the Vasso Galate temple, Clermont-Ferrand

Clermont-Ferrand's first name was Augustonemetum, Latin for "sanctuary for Augustus", or Civitas Arvernorum (town of the Arverni people). It originated on the central knoll where the cathedral is situated today, overlooking the capital of Gaulish Arvernis. The fortified castle of Clarus Mons gave its name to the whole town in 848, to which the small episcopal town of Montferrand was attached in 1731, together taking the name of Clermont-Ferrand. The amalgamation of the two towns was decreed by Louis XIII and confirmed by Louis XV. The old part of Clermont is delimited by the route of the ramparts as they existed at the end of the Middle Ages.

=== Prehistory and Roman era ===
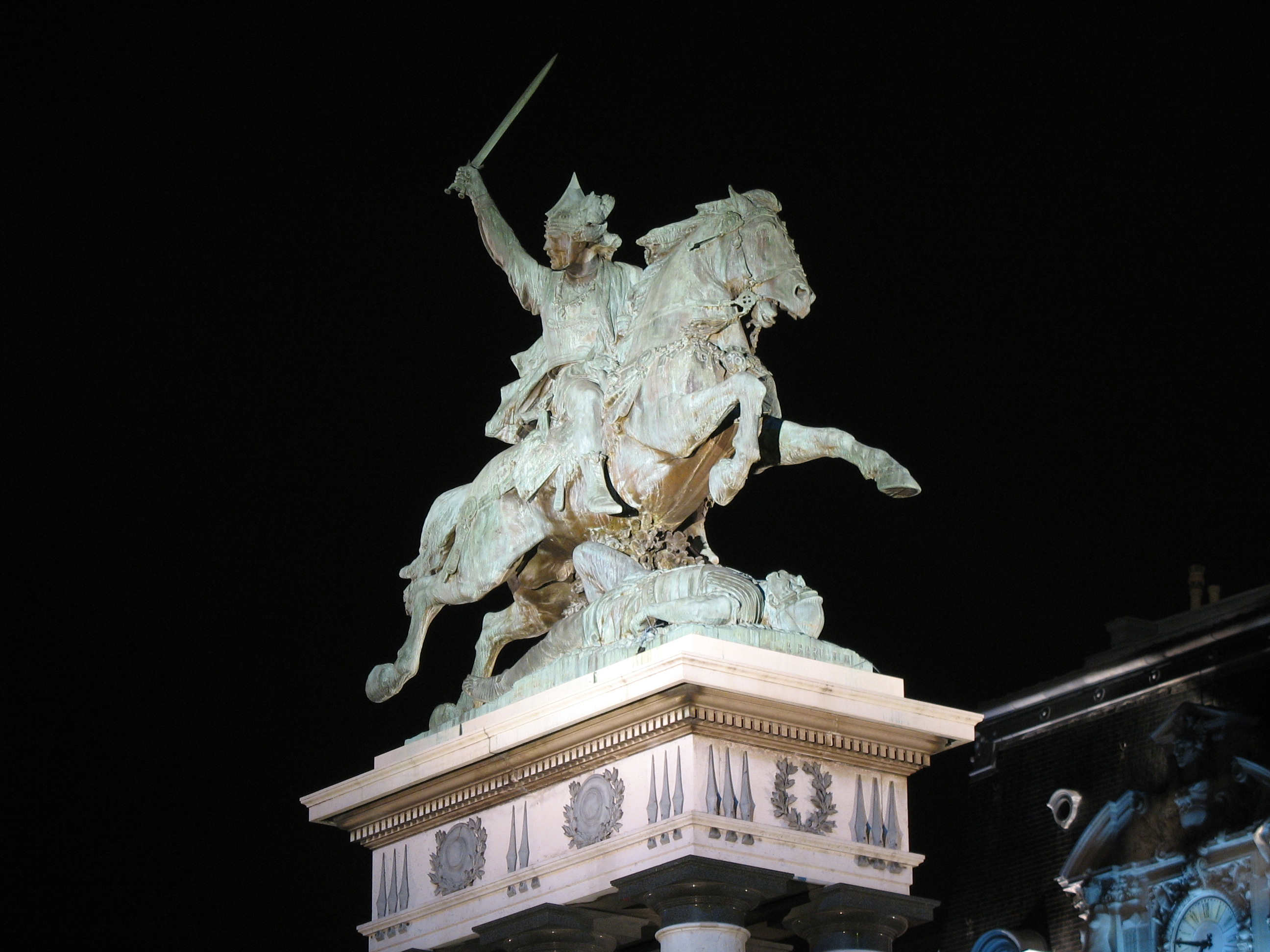
Statue of Vercingétorix by Frédéric Auguste Bartholdi on the main square of the city

Clermont ranks among the oldest cities of France. The first known mention was by the Greek geographer Strabo, who called it the "metropolis of the Arverni" (meaning their oppidum civitas or tribal capital). The city was at that time called Nemessos, a Gaulish word for a sacred forest, and was situated on the mound where the cathedral of Clermont-Ferrand stands today. Somewhere in the area around Nemossos, the Arverni chieftain Vercingetorix (later to head a unified Gallic resistance to the Roman invasion led by Julius Caesar) was born around 72 BC. Nemossos was situated not far from the plateau of Gergovia, where Vercingetorix repulsed the Roman assault at the Battle of Gergovia in 52 BC. After the Roman conquest, the city became known as Augustonemetum. The city also boasts an expansive and largely uncharted network of manmade underground cavities, or souterrains, some of which were in use during Gallo-Roman times.

=== Early Middle Ages ===
The city became the seat of a bishop in the 5th century, at the time of the bishop Namatius, who built a cathedral here described by Gregory of Tours. Clermont went through a dark period after the disappearance of the Roman Empire and during the High Middle Ages was pillaged by the peoples who invaded Gaul. Between 471 and 475, Auvergne was often the target of Visigothic expansion, and the city was frequently besieged, including once by Euric. Although defended by Sidonius Apollinaris, at the head of the diocese from 468 to 486, and the patrician Ecdicius, the city was ceded to the Visigoths by emperor Julius Nepos in 475 and remained part of the Visigothic kingdom until 507. A generation later, it became part of the Kingdom of the Franks. On 8 November 535, the first Council of Clermont opened at Arvernis (Clermont), with fifteen bishops participating, including Caesarius of Arles, Nizier of Lyons, the Bishop of Trier, and Saint Hilarius, Bishop of Mende. The Council issued 16 decrees. The second canon reiterated the principle that the granting of episcopal dignity must be made according to merit and not as a result of intrigues.

In 570, Bishop Avitus ordered the Jews of the city, who numbered over 500, to accept Christian baptism or be expelled.

In 848, the city was renamed Clairmont, after the castle Clarus Mons. During this era, it was an episcopal city ruled by its bishop. Clermont was not spared by the Vikings at the time of the weakening of the Carolingian Empire: it was ravaged by the Normans under Hastein in 862 and 864 and, while its bishop Sigon carried out reconstruction work, again in 898 (or 910, according to some sources). Bishop Étienne II built a new Romanesque cathedral which was consecrated in 946. It was almost entirely replaced by the current Gothic cathedral, though the crypt survives and the towers were only replaced in the 19th century.

=== Middle Ages ===
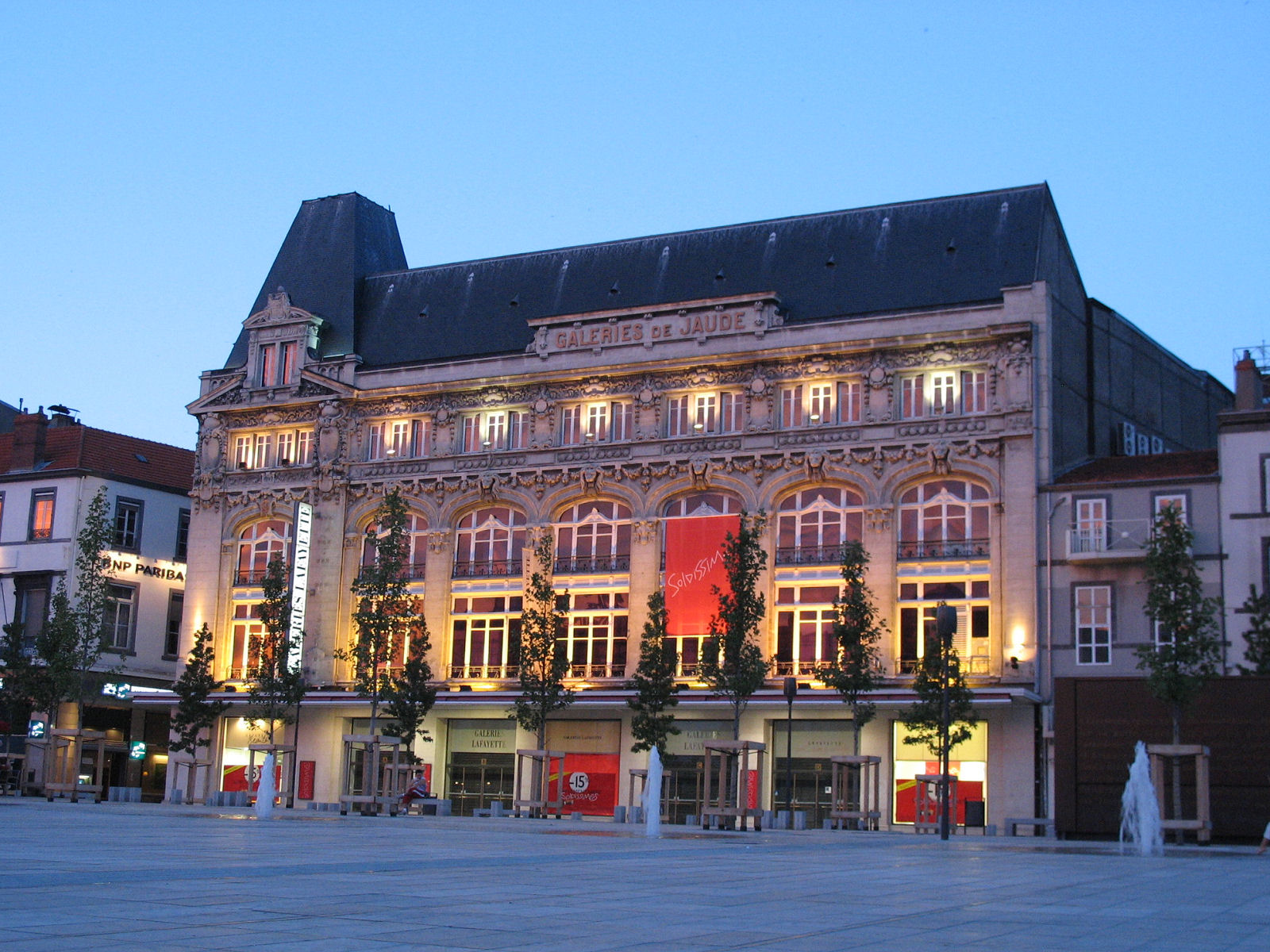
Galeries of Jaude

Clermont was the starting point of the First Crusade, in which Christendom sought to retake Muslim-ruled Jerusalem. Pope Urban II called for the crusade in 1095 at the Second Council of Clermont. In 1120, following repeated crises between the counts of Auvergne and the bishops of Clermont and in order to counteract the clergy's power, the counts founded the rival city of Montferrand on a mound next to the fortifications of Clermont, on the model of the new cities of the Midi that appeared in the 12th and 13th centuries. Until the early modern period, the two remained separate cities: Clermont, an episcopal city; Montferrand, a comital one.

=== Early modern and modern eras ===
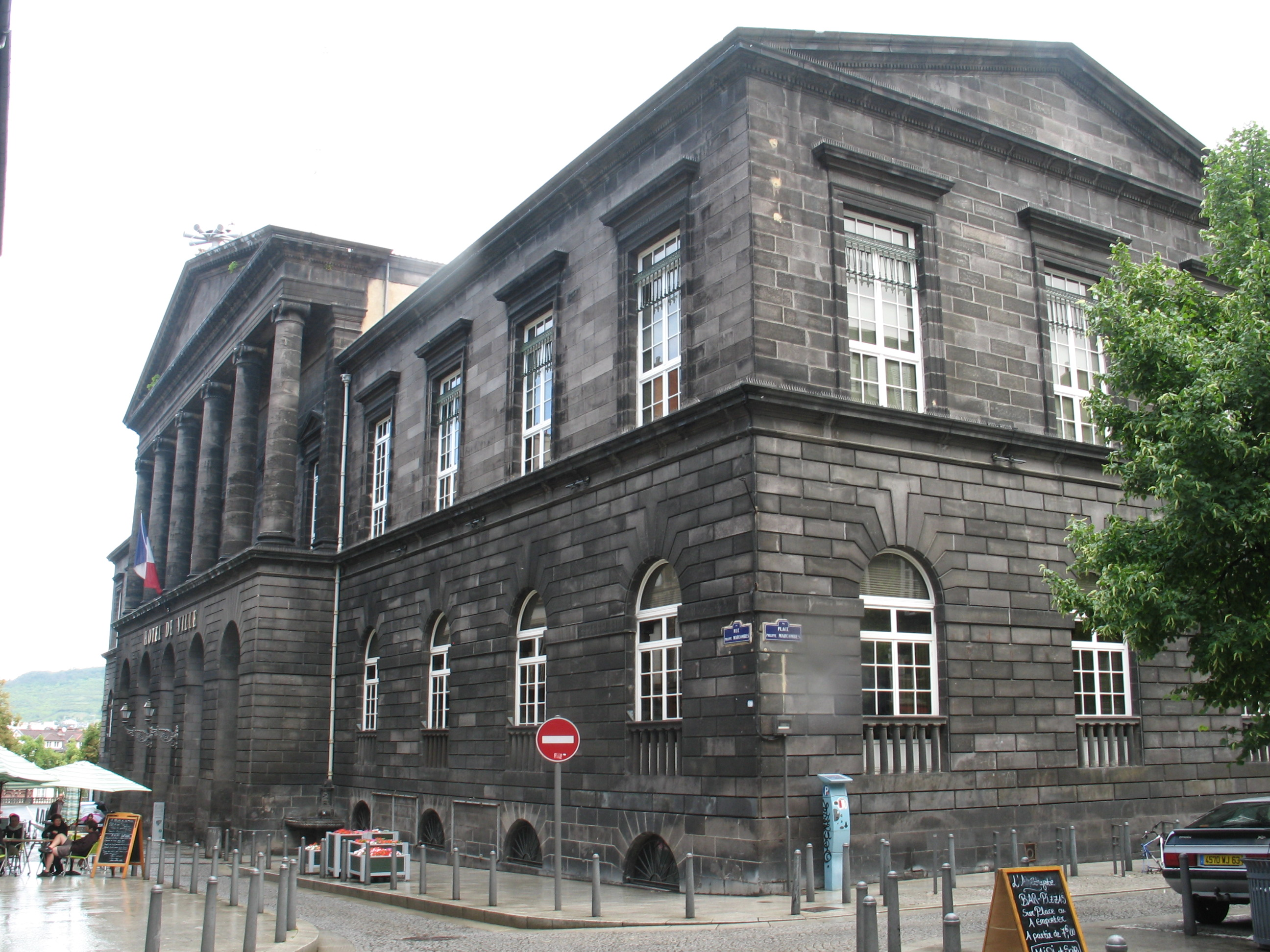
Hôtel de Ville

Clermont became a royal city in 1551, and in 1610, the inseparable property of the French Crown. On 15 April 1630 the Edict of Troyes (the First Edict of Union) joined the two cities of Clermont and Montferrand. This union was confirmed in 1731 by Louis XV with the Second Edict of Union. At this time, Montferrand was no more than a satellite city of Clermont, and it remained so until the beginning of the 20th century. Wishing to retain its independence, Montferrand made three demands for independence, in 1789, 1848, and 1863. The Hôtel de Ville (City Hall) was completed in 1844.

In the 20th century, the construction of the Michelin factories and of city gardens, which shaped modern Clermont-Ferrand, united the two cities, although two distinct downtowns survive and Montferrand retains a strong identity.

== Geography ==
=== Climate ===
Clermont-Ferrand has an oceanic climate (Cfb). The city is in the rain shadow of the Chaîne des Puys, giving it one of the driest climates in metropolitan France, except for a few places around the Mediterranean Sea. The mountains also block most of the oceanic influence of the Atlantic, which creates a much more continental climate than in nearby cities west or north of the mountains, like Limoges and Montluçon. Thus the city has comparatively cold winters and hot summers. From November to March, frost is very frequent, and the city, being at the bottom of a valley, is frequently subject to temperature inversion, in which the mountains are sunny and warm, and the plain is freezing cold and cloudy. Snow is quite common, although usually short-lived and light. Summer temperatures sometimes exceed 35 °C (95 °F), with violent thunderstorms. The highest temperature was reached in 2019 of 40.9 °C (105.6 °F) while the lowest was −29.0 °C (−20.2 °F).

Climate data for Clermont-Ferrand, elevation: 331 m (1,086 ft) (1991–2020 normals, extremes 1923–present)
Month	Jan	Feb	Mar	Apr	May	Jun	Jul	Aug	Sep	Oct	Nov	Dec	Year
Record high °C (°F)	22.1 (71.8)	25.9 (78.6)	26.6 (79.9)	31.3 (88.3)	33.0 (91.4)	40.9 (105.6)	40.7 (105.3)	40.4 (104.7)	36.8 (98.2)	33.2 (91.8)	24.7 (76.5)	21.9 (71.4)	40.9 (105.6)
Mean daily maximum °C (°F)	8.0 (46.4)	9.5 (49.1)	13.7 (56.7)	16.6 (61.9)	20.5 (68.9)	24.2 (75.6)	26.8 (80.2)	26.8 (80.2)	22.5 (72.5)	17.8 (64.0)	12.0 (53.6)	8.6 (47.5)	17.3 (63.1)
Daily mean °C (°F)	4.3 (39.7)	5.1 (41.2)	8.3 (46.9)	10.9 (51.6)	14.8 (58.6)	18.4 (65.1)	20.6 (69.1)	20.6 (69.1)	16.7 (62.1)	13.0 (55.4)	7.9 (46.2)	5.0 (41.0)	12.1 (53.8)
Mean daily minimum °C (°F)	0.6 (33.1)	0.6 (33.1)	3.0 (37.4)	5.3 (41.5)	9.1 (48.4)	12.6 (54.7)	14.5 (58.1)	14.4 (57.9)	10.9 (51.6)	8.3 (46.9)	3.9 (39.0)	1.4 (34.5)	7.1 (44.8)
Record low °C (°F)	−23.1 (−9.6)	−29.0 (−20.2)	−21.3 (−6.3)	−7.1 (19.2)	−4.2 (24.4)	1.0 (33.8)	3.8 (38.8)	2.4 (36.3)	−3.0 (26.6)	−9.2 (15.4)	−11.8 (10.8)	−25.8 (−14.4)	−29.0 (−20.2)
Average precipitation mm (inches)	26.7 (1.05)	18.7 (0.74)	26.1 (1.03)	51.1 (2.01)	66.5 (2.62)	67.5 (2.66)	63.3 (2.49)	62.0 (2.44)	57.5 (2.26)	48.8 (1.92)	46.2 (1.82)	29.1 (1.15)	563.4 (22.18)
Average precipitation days (≥ 1.0 mm)	6.4	5.0	6.5	8.3	9.4	8.0	7.4	7.5	6.7	7.8	7.8	6.4	87.2
Average snowy days	4.3	4.8	2.2	0.6	0.1	0.0	0.0	0.0	0.0	0.0	1.6	4.0	17.7
Average relative humidity (%)	79	75	69	69	72	71	68	70	73	78	78	80	74
Mean monthly sunshine hours	84.6	109.6	165.4	179.1	199.7	225.2	255.6	243.2	191.4	136.0	90.3	77.7	1,957.9
Source 1: Meteo France
Source 2: Infoclimat.fr (relative humidity 1961–1990)

=== Main sights ===
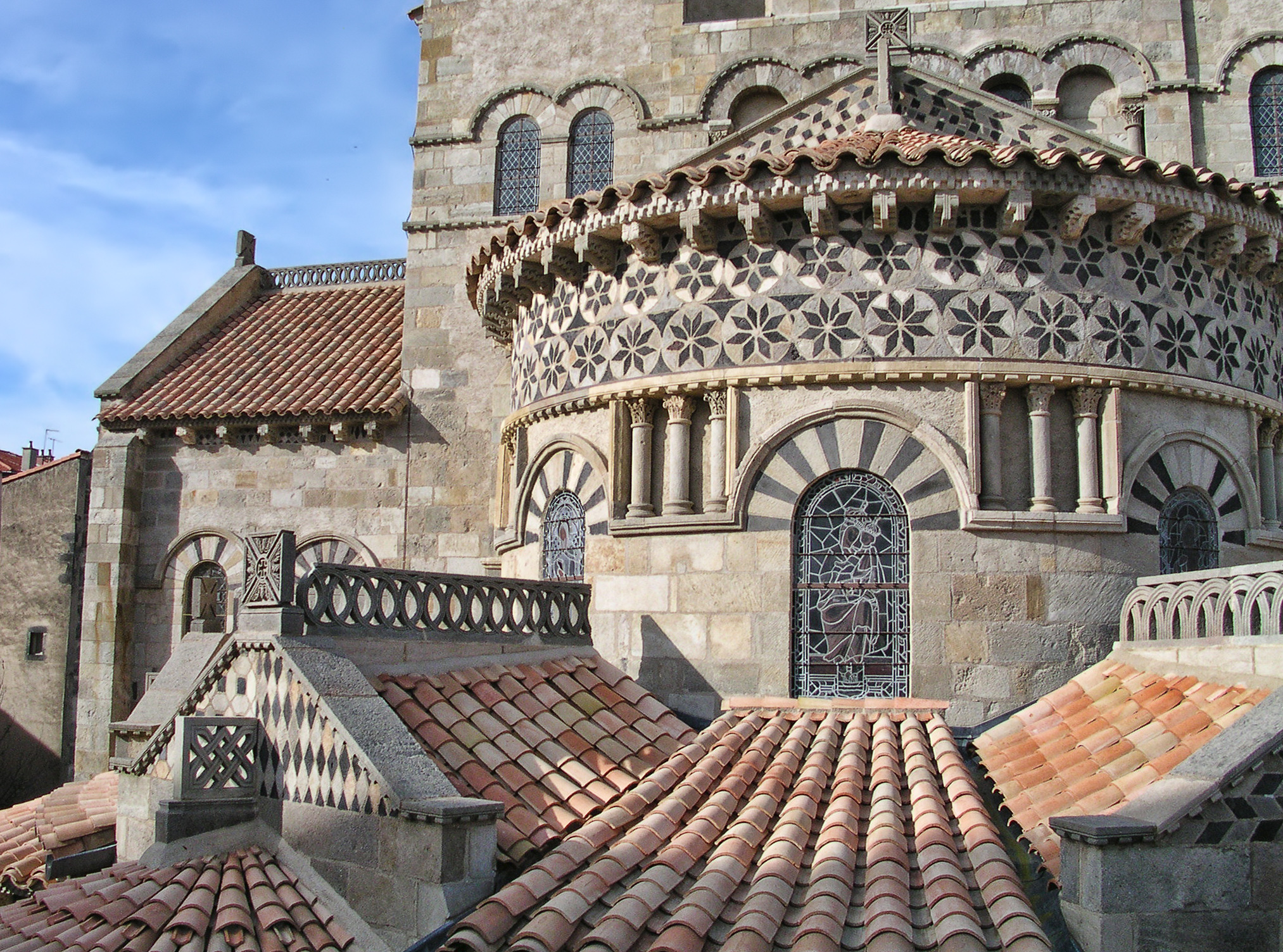
Basilica of Notre-Dame du Port

==== Religious architecture ====
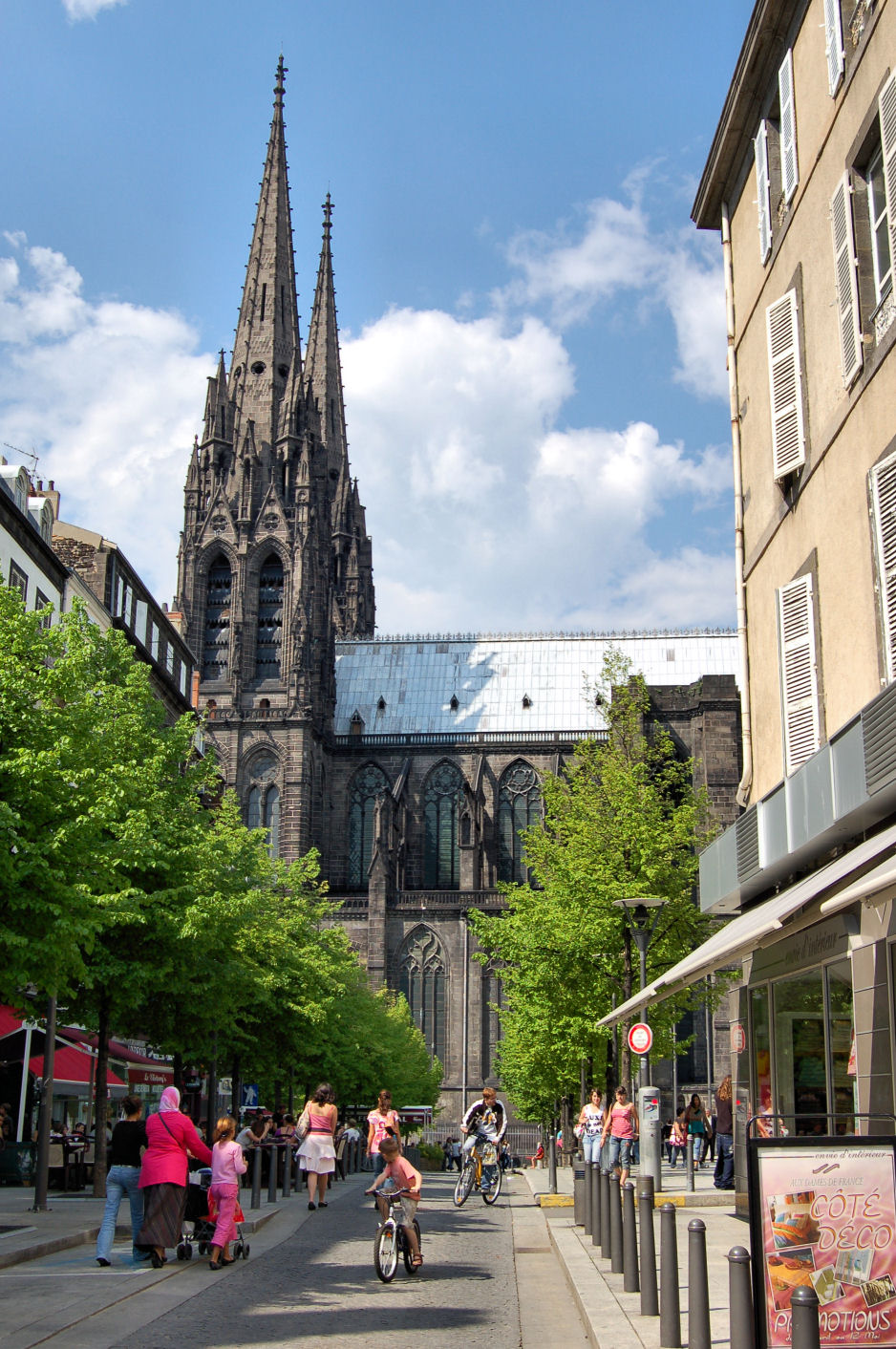
Clermont-Ferrand Cathedral of Notre-Dame de l'Assomption

Clermont-Ferrand has two famous churches. One is Notre-Dame du Port, a Romanesque church which was built during the 11th and 12th centuries (the bell tower was rebuilt during the 19th century). It was nominated as a World Heritage Site by UNESCO in 1998. The other is Clermont-Ferrand Cathedral (Cathédrale Notre-Dame-de-l'Assomption de Clermont-Ferrand), built in Gothic style between the 13th and the 19th centuries.

==== Parks and gardens ====
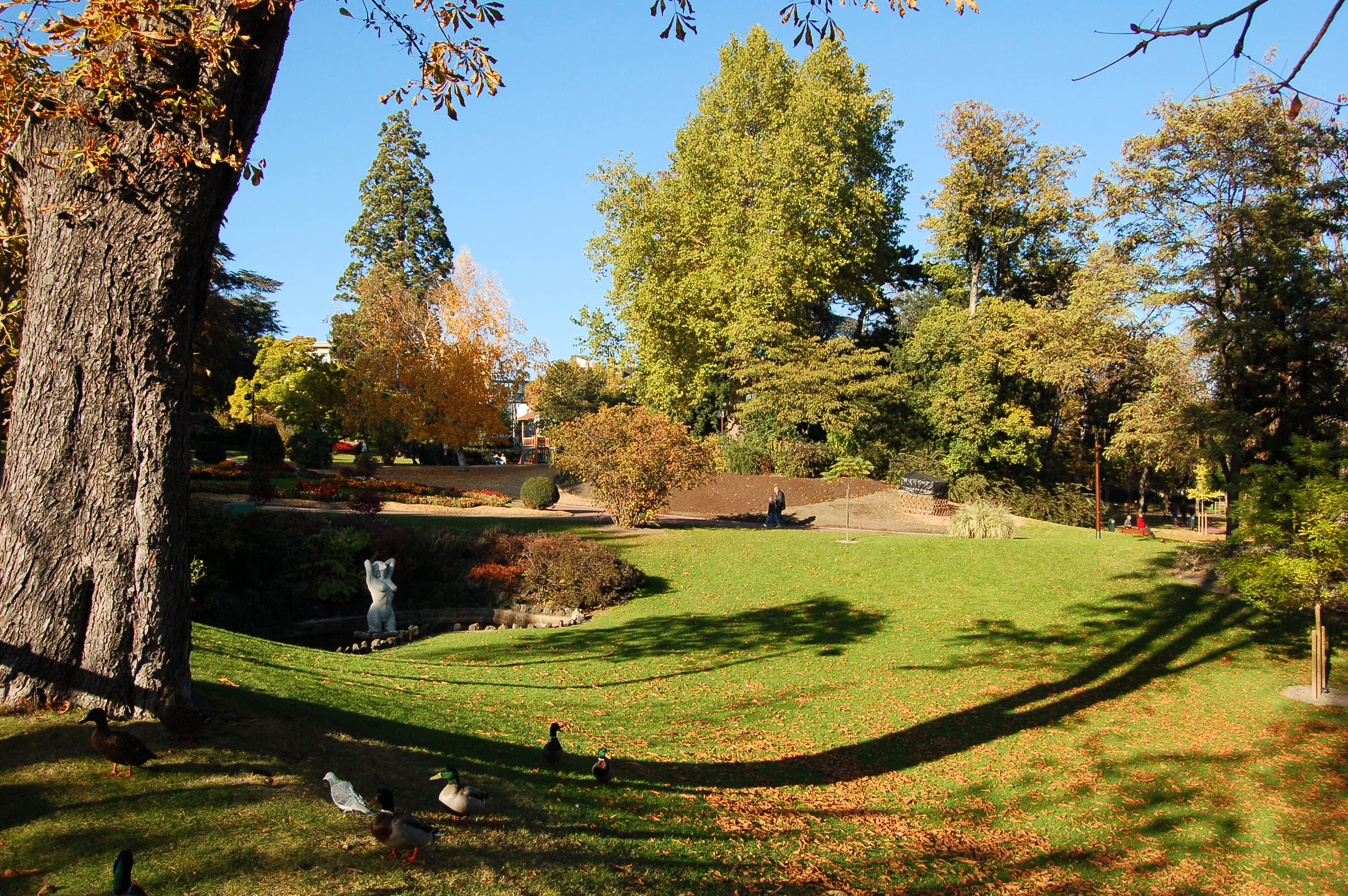
Lecoq Garden (Jardin Lecoq)

- Jardin Lecoq
- Parc de Montjuzet
- Jardin botanique de la Charme
- Arboretum de Royat
- Jardin botanique d'Auvergne

==== Buildings ====
- Galeries of Jaude
- Hôtel d'Aubière
- Hôtel de Ville
- Gallo-Roman wall of the Vasso Galate temple

== Economy and infrastructure ==
Food production and processing as well as engineering are major employers in the area, as are the many research facilities of leading computer software and pharmaceutical companies.

The city's industry was for a long time linked to the French tyre manufacturer Michelin, which created the radial tyre and expanded from Clermont-Ferrand to become a worldwide leader in its industry. For most of the 20th century, it had extensive factories throughout the city, employing up to 30,000 workers. While the company has maintained its headquarters in the city, most of the manufacturing is now done in foreign countries. This downsizing took place gradually, allowing the city to court new investment in other industries, thus avoiding the fate of many post-industrial cities and keeping it a very wealthy and prosperous area home to many high-income executives.

=== Transport ===
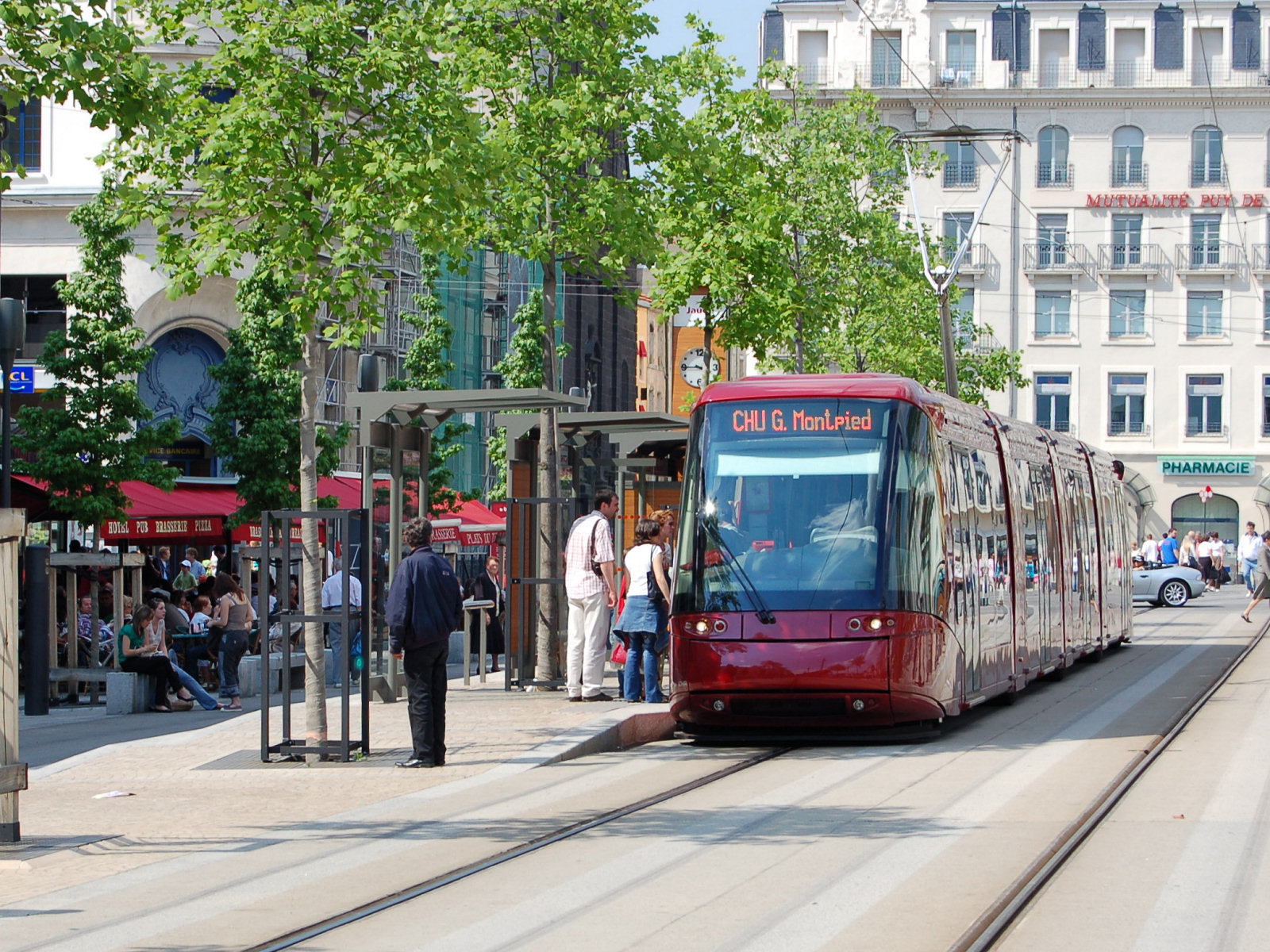
Tramway in Clermont-Ferrand

The main railway station has connections to Paris and several regional destinations: Lyon, Moulins via Vichy, Le Puy-en-Velay, Aurillac, Nîmes, Issoire, Montluçon and Thiers.

The A71 motorway connects Clermont-Ferrand with Orléans and Bourges, the A75 with Montpellier and the A89 with Bordeaux, Lyon and Saint-Étienne (A72). The airport offers flights within France. Recently, Clermont-Ferrand was France's first city to get a new Translohr transit system, the Clermont-Ferrand tramway, thereby linking the city's north and south neighbourhoods.

The TGV will arrive in Auvergne after 2030. It will be one of the last regions not to have a TGV stop.

Clermont-Ferrand Auvergne Airport serves only a handful of mostly domestic destinations. For international travel, the city is served by the nearest international airport, Lyon–Saint-Exupéry Airport, which is located 190 km (120 mi) to the east of Clermont-Ferrand.

== Population ==
Historical population

Year	Pop.	±% p.a.
1793	30,000	—
1800	30,000	+0.00%
1806	30,982	+0.54%
1821	30,010	−0.21%
1831	28,257	−0.60%
1836	32,427	+2.79%
1841	35,152	+1.63%
1846	34,083	−0.62%
1851	33,516	−0.33%
1856	38,160	+2.63%
1861	37,275	−0.47%
1866	37,461	+0.10%
1872	37,357	−0.05%
1876	41,772	+2.83%
1881	43,033	+0.60%
1886	46,718	+1.66%
1891	50,119	+1.42%
1896	50,870	+0.30%
1901	52,933	+0.80%

Year	Pop.	±% p.a.
1906	58,363	+1.97%
1911	65,386	+2.30%
1921	82,577	+2.36%
1926	111,711	+6.23%
1931	103,143	−1.58%
1936	101,128	−0.39%
1946	108,090	+0.67%
1954	113,391	+0.60%
1962	127,547	+1.48%
1968	148,759	+2.60%
1975	156,763	+0.75%
1982	147,224	−0.89%
1990	136,181	−0.97%
1999	137,140	+0.08%
2007	139,501	+0.21%
2012	141,569	+0.29%
2017	143,886	+0.33%
2023	146,351	+0.28%

Source: EHESS and INSEE (1968-2023)

== Culture ==
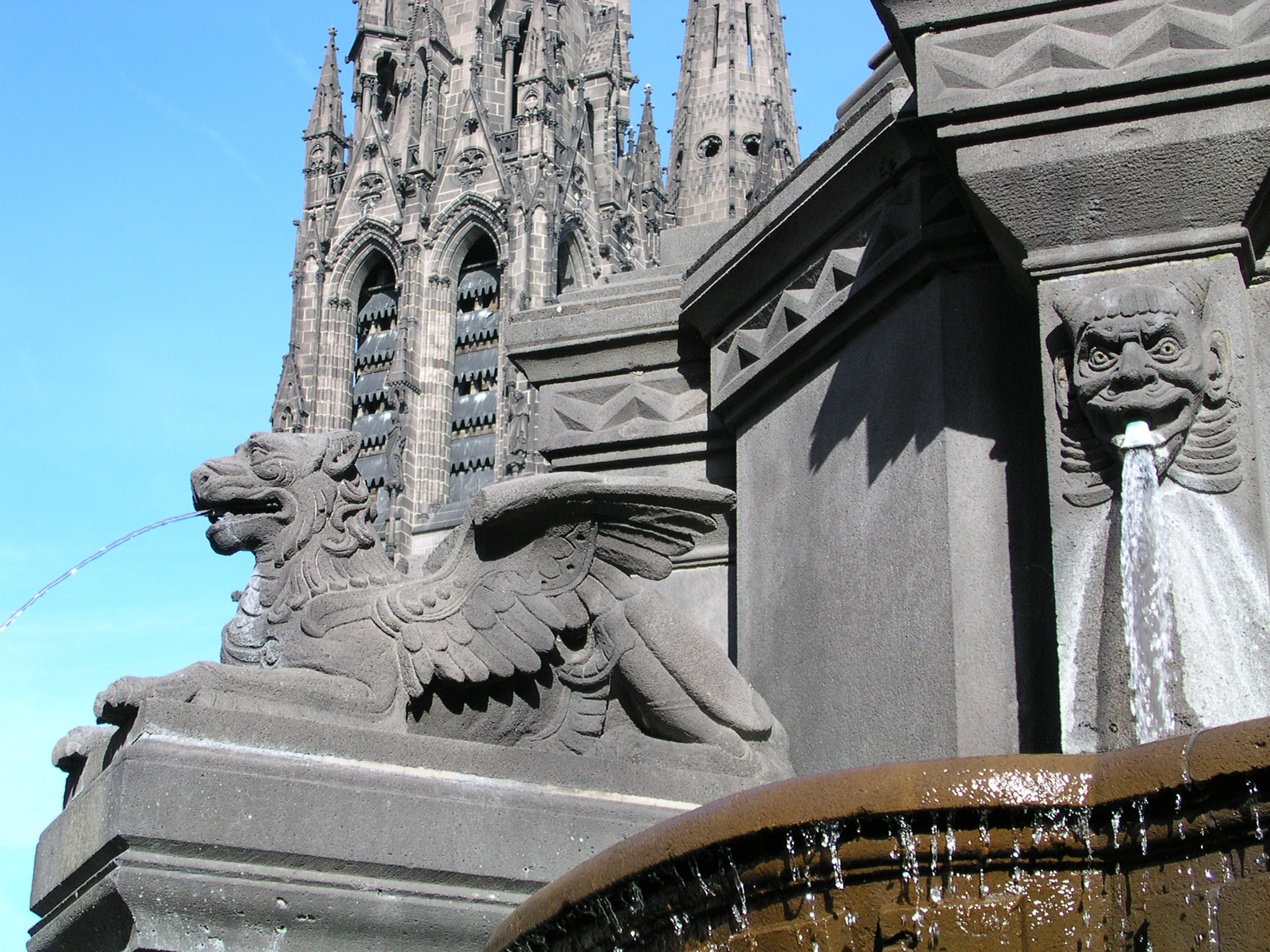
One of the 48 public fountains with the cathedral in background. The fountain and the cathedral are made with the typical black volcanic stone of the area, named "pierre de Volvic".

Clermont-Ferrand was the home of mathematician and philosopher Blaise Pascal, who tested Evangelista Torricelli's hypothesis concerning the influence of gas pressure on liquid equilibrium. This is the experiment in which a vacuum is created in a mercury tube; Pascal's experiment had his brother-in-law carry a barometer to the top of the Puy-de-Dôme. The Université Blaise-Pascal (or Clermont-Ferrand II) was located primarily in the city and is named after him.

Clermont-Ferrand also hosts the Clermont-Ferrand International Short Film Festival, the world's first international short film festival, which originated in 1979. This festival, which brings thousands of people every year (137,000 in 2008) to the city, is the second French film Festival after Cannes in terms of visitors, but ranks first for spectators (in Cannes, visitors are not allowed in theatres, only professionals). This festival has revealed many young talented directors who are now well known in France and internationally, such as Mathieu Kassovitz, Cédric Klapisch and Éric Zonka.

Beside the short film festival, Clermont-Ferrand hosts more than twenty music, film, dance, theatre and video and digital art festivals every year. With more than 800 artistic groups from dance to music, Clermont-Ferrand and the Auvergne region's cultural life is significant in France. One of the city's nicknames is "The Liverpool of France". Groups such as The Elderberries and Cocoon were formed there.

Additionally, the city was the subject of the acclaimed documentary The Sorrow and the Pity, which used Clermont-Ferrand as the basis of the film, telling the story of France under Nazi occupation and the Vichy regime of Marshal Pétain. Pierre Laval, Pétain's "handman", was an Auvergnat.

My Night at Maud's (French: Ma nuit chez Maud), a 1969 French drama film by Éric Rohmer, was set and filmed in Clermont-Ferrand in and around Christmas Eve. It is the third film (fourth in order of release) in his series of Six Moral Tales. Pascal's wager, a philosophical and theological thought experiment from Blaise Pascal's Pensées, is a major theme in the film. Pascal was born in Clermont-Ferrand in 1623.

The city also hosts L'Aventure Michelin, the museum dedicated to the history of Michelin group.

=== Sport ===
A racing circuit close to the city, the Charade Circuit, using closed-off public roads, held the French Grand Prix in 1965, 1969, 1970 and 1972. It was a daunting circuit, with such harsh elevation changes that some drivers became ill as they drove. Winners included Jim Clark, Jackie Stewart (twice), and Jochen Rindt.

Clermont-Ferrand has some experience in hosting major international sports tournaments, including the FIBA EuroBasket 1999. The city was the finish of Tour de France stages in 1951 and 1959, and hosted the start of the 2023 Tour de France Femmes.

The city is also home to a rugby union club competing at international level, ASM Clermont Auvergne, as well as Clermont Foot, a football club that has competed in France's top tier, Ligue 1 from 2021–22 to 2023–24.

In the sevens version of rugby union, Clermont-Ferrand has hosted the France Women's Sevens, the final event in each season's World Rugby Women's Sevens Series, since 2016.

=== Media ===
Local TV coverage is provided by the regional network, France 3 Auvergne-Rhône-Alpes, part of France's national public television network, France Télévisions which broadcast from Lyon. However, the network also has a studio in the Chamalières area of the city.

Local radio that broadcast to the city are Ici Pays d'Auvergne, Radio Arverne, Logos FM, Radio Scoop, and Fusion FM.

The city is served by the local newspaper, La Montagne (newspaper) which publishes daily.

== Famous people ==
=== Born in Clermont-Ferrand ===
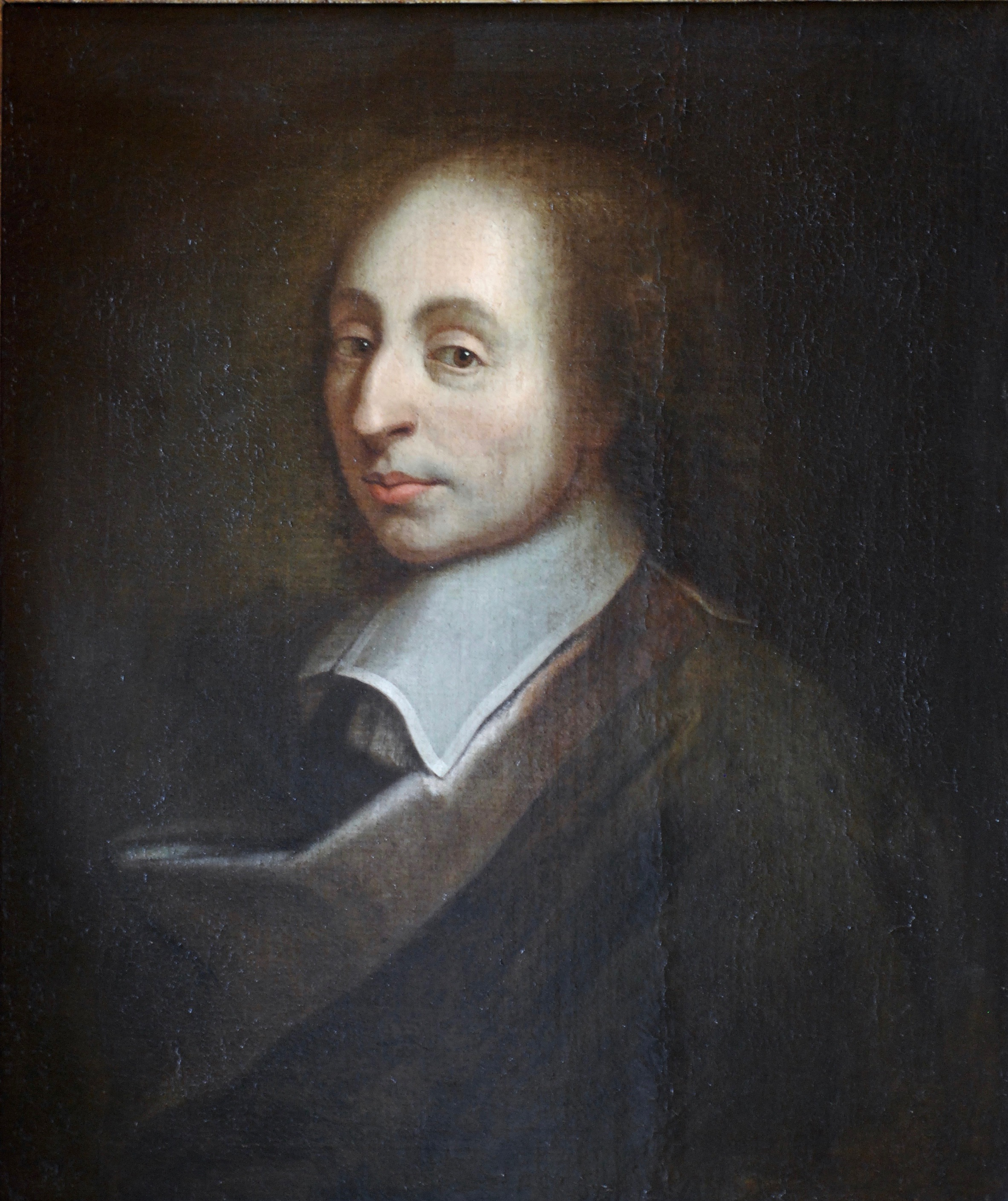
Blaise Pascal, c. 1690

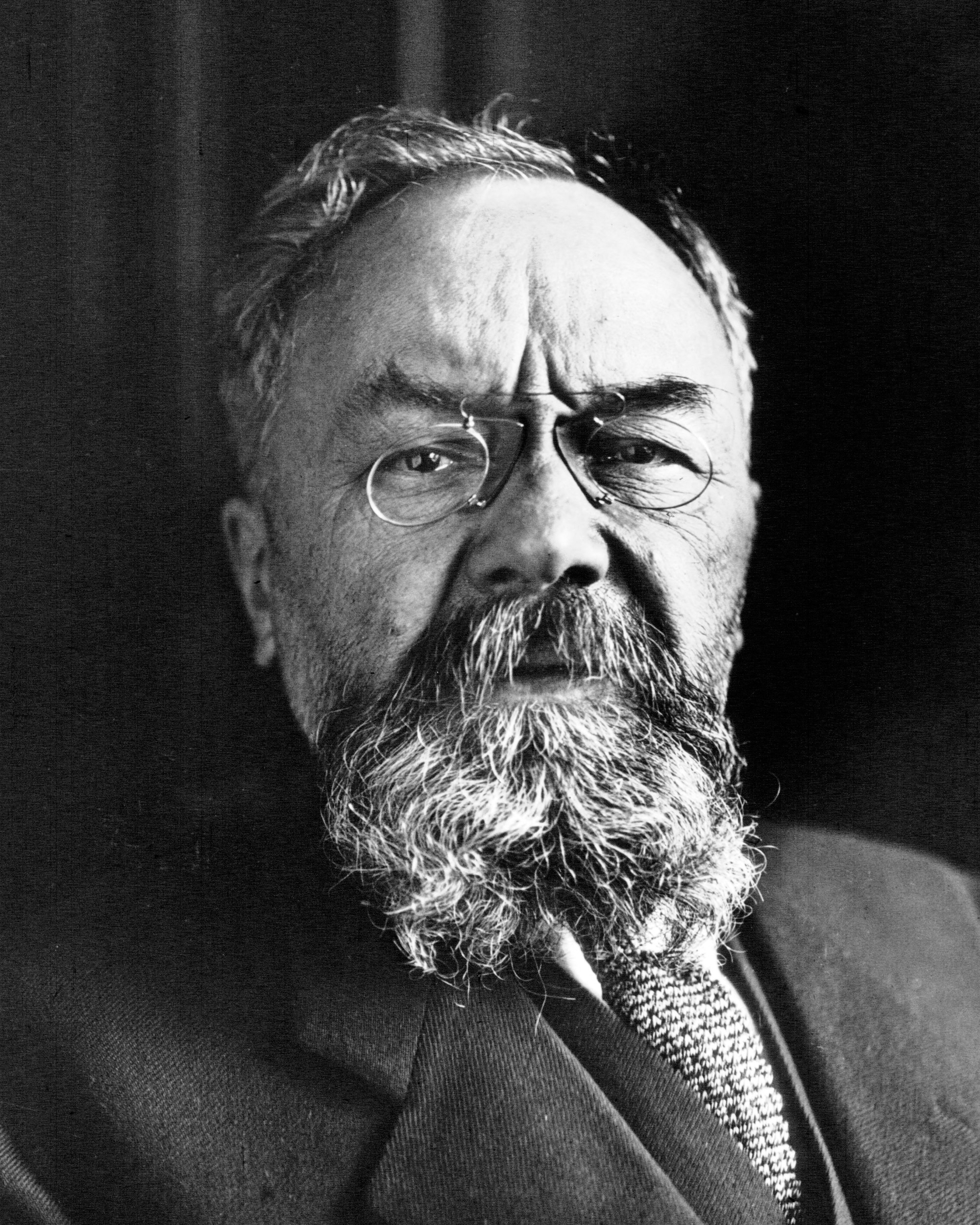
André Michelin, 1920

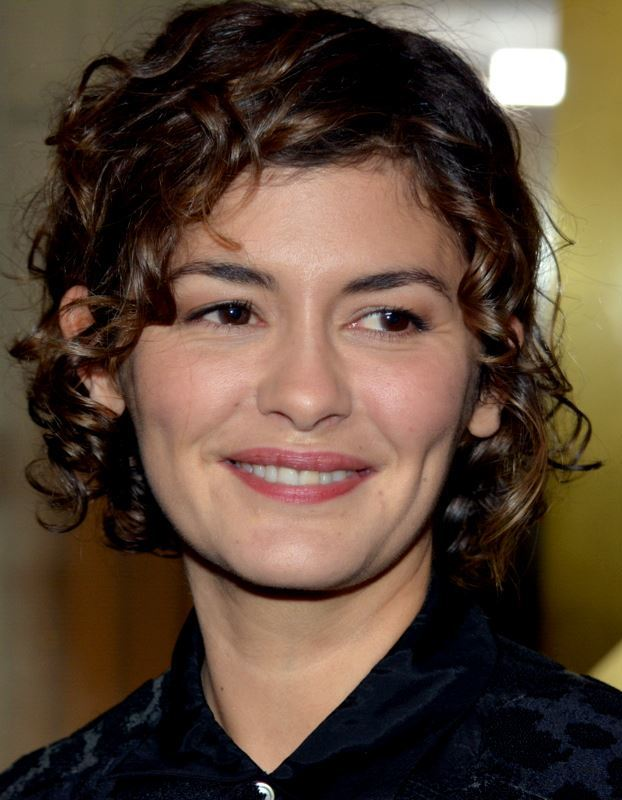
Audrey Tautou

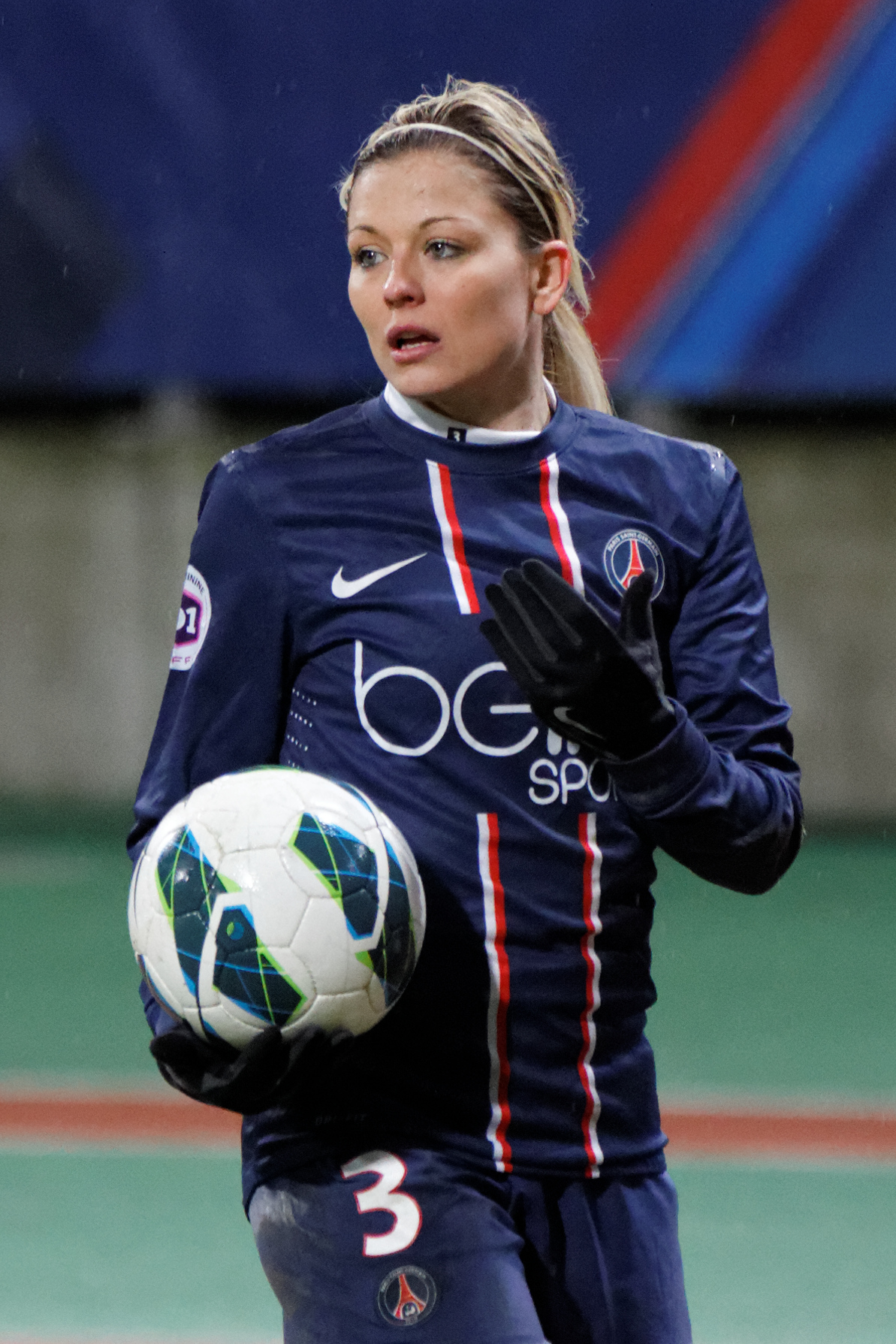
Laure Boulleau

- Avitus (c. 385 – c. 456), Roman emperor from the West from 455 to 456
- Fadela Amara (born 1964), feminist and politician
- Martine Blanc (born 1944), author and illustrator of ten books for children
- Antoine-Jean Bourlin (1752–1828), known as Dumaniant, comedian and goguettier
- Thomas Cailley (born 1980), French screenwriter and film director
- Nicolas Chamfort (1741–1794), writer of epigrams and aphorisms
- Étienne Clémentel (1864–1936), politician, government minister and painter
- Cécile Coulon (born 1990), novelist, poet and short story writer
- Jacques Delille (1738 in Aigueperse – 1813). He translated Virgil's Georgics and wrote a didactic poem on gardening.
- Lolo Ferrari (1963–2000), dancer, actress and singer with very large breast implants
- Gregory of Tours (c. 538 – 594), Gallo-Roman historian and Bishop of Tours
- Ginette Hamelin (1913–1944), French engineer and architect, member of the French resistance, died in a concentration camp
- Annelise Hesme (born 1976), actress and player of cello and piano
- Thierry Laget (born 1959), writer, winner of the 1992 Prix Fénéon
- Edmond Lemaigre (1849–1890), composer and organist
- Antoine de Lhoyer (1768–1852), composer, guitarist and soldier
- Bernard Loiseau (1951–2003), celebrity chef
- François-Bernard Mâche (born 1935), composer of contemporary music
- Antoine François Marmontel (1816–1898), pianist and teacher at the Paris Conservatory
- Léon Melchissédec (1843–1925), baritone and teacher at the Paris Conservatory
- André Michelin (1853–1931) and Édouard Michelin (1859–1940), creators of the Michelin tyre group, whose global headquarters are still located in Clermont-Ferrand
- Léonard Morel-Ladeuil (1820–1888), goldsmith and sculptor
- George Onslow (1784–1853), composer, mainly of chamber music
- Victor Pachon (1867–1938), physiologist. He worked on blood pressure.
- Blaise Pascal (1623–1662), mathematician, physicist and religious philosopher
- Jacqueline Pascal (1625–1661), child prodigy, youngest sister of Blaise Pascal. She composed verses
- Gilberte Périer (1620–1687), biographer, eldest sister of Blaise Pascal
- Dominique Perrault (born 1953), architect. He designed the French National Library.
- Henri Pognon (1853–1921), epigrapher, archaeologist and diplomat
- Henri Quittard (1864–1919), composer, musicologist and music critic
- François Dominique de Reynaud, Comte de Montlosier (1755–1838), politician and political writer
- Peire Rogier (born ca. 1145), Auvergnat troubadour (fl. 1160 – 1180) and cathedral canon
- Audrey Tautou (born 1976), actress and model
- Pierre Teilhard de Chardin (1881–1955), philosopher, Jesuit priest and paleontologist
- Alexandre Kantorow (born 1997), pianist

==== Sport ====
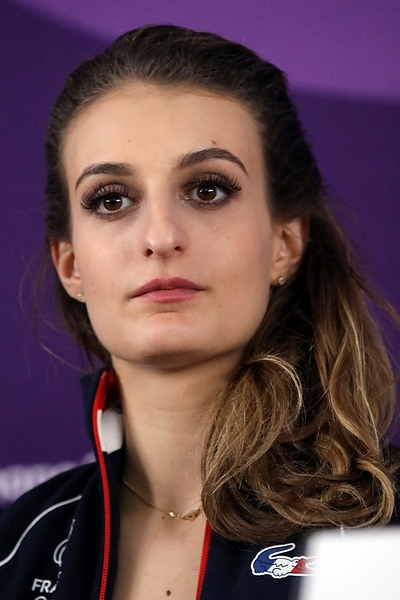
Gabriella Papadakis, 2018

- Chakir Ansari (born 1991), Moroccan freestyle wrestler. He competed at the 2016 Summer Olympics.
- Laure Boulleau (born 1986), footballer with 216 club caps and 65 for France women
- Patrick Depailler (1944–1980), Formula One driver
- Yves Dreyfus (1931–2021), epee fencer, bronze medalist at the 1956 Summer Olympics
- Raphaël Géminiani (1925–2024), French former road bicycle racer
- Jordan Lotiès (born 1984), footballer with 370 club caps
- Émile Mayade (1853–1898), motoring pioneer and racing driver
- Darline Nsoki (born 1989), basketball player
- Vincent Cé Ougna (born 1985), former footballer
- Gabriella Papadakis (born 1995), ice dancer, Olympic champion (2022), Olympic silver medalist (2018), five-time world champion (2015, 2016, 2018, 2019, 2022) and five-time European champion (2015–2019)
- Émile Pladner (1906–1980), flyweight champion boxer; 104 wins, 16 losses and 13 draws
- Jean-Louis Rosier (1925–2011), racing driver
- Aurélien Rougerie (born 1980), rugby union player, with 417 club caps and 47 for France
- Christian Sarron (born 1955), Grand Prix motorcycle road racer
- Gauthier de Tessières (born 1981), World Cup alpine ski racer
- Rémi Cavagna (born 1995), professional road cyclist

=== Resident in Clermont-Ferrand ===
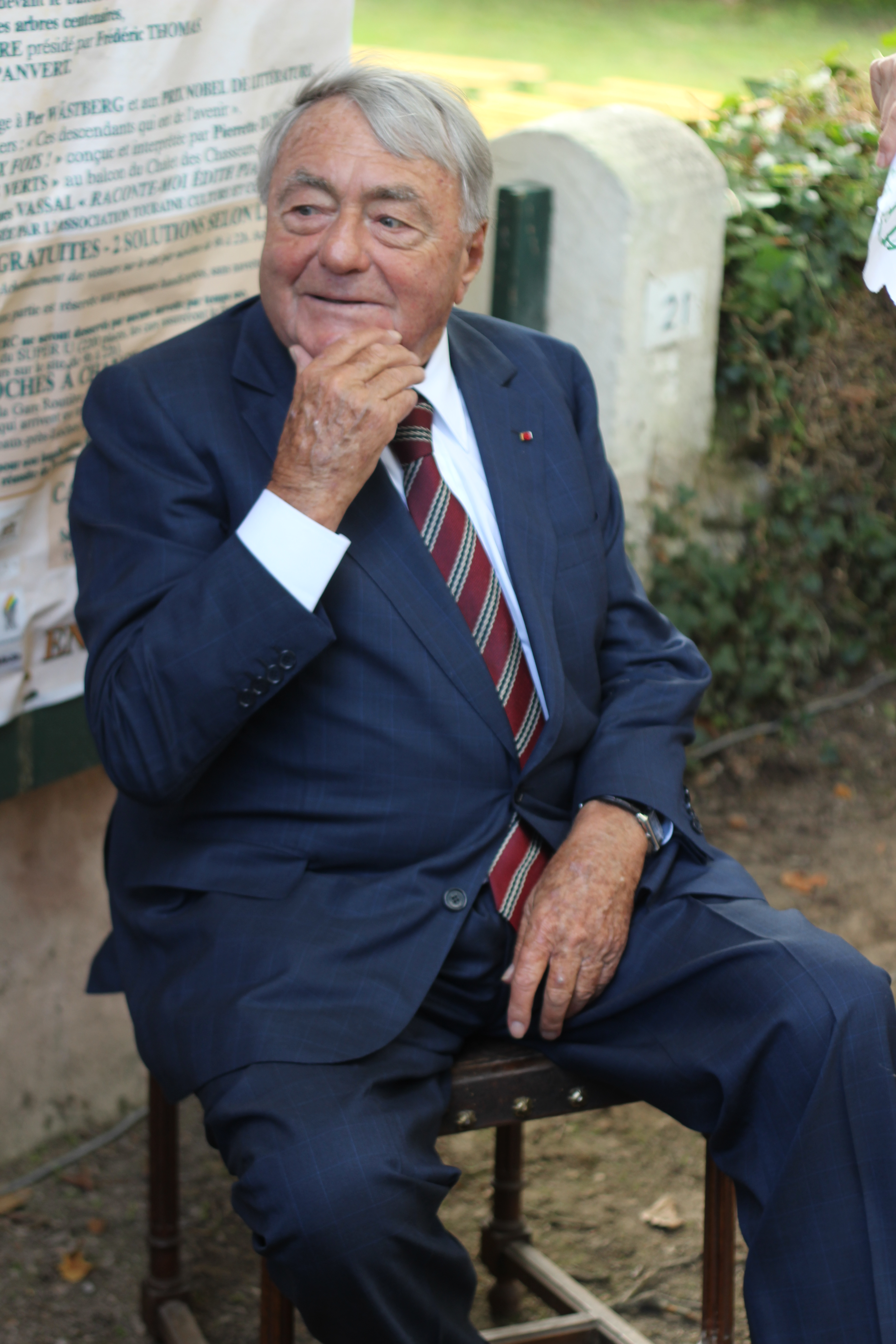
Claude Lanzmann

- Sidonius Apollinaris (c. 430 – after 489), Gallo-Roman poet, diplomat and bishop
- Henri Bergson (1859–1941), philosopher
- Olivier Bianchi (born 1970), politician and Mayor of Clermont-Ferrand from 2014 to 2026
- Paul Bourget (1852–1935), novelist and critic
- Ivor Bueb (1923–1959), British professional sports car racing and Formula One driver
- Anton Docher (1852–1928), "The Padre of Isleta", Roman Catholic priest, missionary and defender of the Indians. He lived in the pueblo of Isleta, in the state of New Mexico, for 34 years.
- Valéry Giscard d'Estaing (1927–2020), president of France from 1974 to 1981. He lived in the city of Chamalières, part of Clermont-Ferrand's metropolitan area.
- Claude Lanzmann (1925–2018), filmmaker. He attended the Lycée Blaise-Pascal.

== Education ==
Education is also an important sector in the economy of Clermont-Ferrand.

The University of Clermont Auvergne (formed in 2017 from a merger of Université Blaise Pascal and Université d'Auvergne) is located in the city and has a total student population of over 37,000, along with university faculty and staff.

With around 2,700 students, Clermont Auvergne INP is the biggest engineering graduate school in the city.

A division of Polytech (an engineering school of Clermont Auvergne INP) located in Clermont-Ferrand made the news when two of its students, Laurent Bonomo and Gabriel Ferez, were murdered in June 2008 while enrolled in a program at Imperial College in London in what was to be known as the New Cross double murder.

The ESC Clermont Business School, created in 1919, is also located in the city.

== Twin towns – sister cities ==
Clermont-Ferrand is twinned with:

- Aberdeen, Scotland (since 1983)
- Braga, Portugal
- Gomel, Belarus
- Norman, Oklahoma, United States
- Oviedo, Spain
- Regensburg, Germany (since 1969)
- Salford, England, United Kingdom

== See also ==
- Communes of the Puy-de-Dôme department
- Jaude Centre
- List of works by Auguste Carli
- List of twin towns and sister cities in France
- Trémonteix sanctuary

== Bibliography ==
- Chardonnet, Sylvain (2025). "Le quartier arménien de Clermont-Ferrand (années 1930). Un rassemblement d'Arméniens du Nord-Ouest de l'Anatolie en Auvergne". Bulletin Historique et Scientifique de l'Auvergne (in French). CXXII-2 (2023). Clermont-Ferrand, France: Académie des Sciences, Belles-Lettres et Arts de Clermont-Ferrand: 43–68.
- Sweets, John F. (1986). Choices in Vichy France: The French under Nazi Occupation. New York.
