= Darleen =

Darleen is a first name, and may refer to:

- Darleen Carr, an American actress
- Darleen Druyun, a former United States Air Force official
- Darleen Ortega, an American judge
- Darleen Wilson, a musician and producer

== See also ==
- Darlene (disambiguation)
