= New Cross double murder =

2008 murder case in the United Kingdom

The New Cross double murder occurred on 29 June 2008. Two French research students, Laurent Bonomo and Gabriel Ferez, were stabbed to death in New Cross, in the London Borough of Lewisham in South East London, England.

== Murders ==
The victims were bound, gagged, and tortured over several hours; they died after being stabbed 196 and 47 times, respectively. The bodies were discovered by firefighters in a flat in which a fire had been started deliberately. The flat, rented by Laurent Bonomo, was in Sterling Gardens, New Cross, in South East London. A post mortem exam at Greenwich Mortuary showed both died from wounds to the head, neck and chest before the fire took hold. A petrol-like accelerant was poured upon their bodies.

== Victims ==
Both victims were biochemistry students in their third year of a master's degree at Polytech Clermont-Ferrand university in France, who were on a three-month DNA research project exchange programme at Imperial College London. Bonomo was from Velaux, Bouches-du-Rhône in southern France; Ferez from Prouzel, Picardy in northern France.

== Investigation ==
It was established that the victims' bank cards and two Sony PSP handheld game consoles were missing, and it was believed they were stolen by the killers. Prior to the events, on 23 June 2008, the same flat was burgled and a laptop was stolen.

The Metropolitan Police announced on 5 July 2008 the arrest of a 21-year-old man, who was released on the afternoon of 6 July without further action.

=== E-fit ===
On 6 July 2008 police issued an image of the murders' main suspect, based on the descriptions of witnesses who had seen him running away from Sterling Gardens just after 22:00 BST. He was described as "white, 30 to 40 years of age, of slight or slim build and wearing light coloured baseball cap, a dark top with the word "Junfan" on, blue jeans and white trainers".

Ferez's parents Françoise and Olivier, of Prouzel, appealed: "Please help us to reveal the truth. Help us to know, to understand and to come to terms with our loss." They also stated: "Rest assured that we will not leave you in peace; and you will not be able to live in hiding forever." DCI Mick Duthie stated: "I also want to reiterate an appeal for anyone who saw or heard anything suspicious throughout that day, last Sunday, June 29. Just to repeat what we know: Laurent spoke to his fiancée around 01:00 BST on the Sunday morning. After that, no-one heard from Laurent or Gabriel or saw them. It is important to stress that the attack could have taken place at any time during Sunday."

=== Second arrest and charge ===
Police held in custody 33-year-old Nigel Edward Farmer who handed himself in to police at Lewisham Police Station. He was later taken to hospital for treatment of his injuries.

The thin 33-year-old man whose face and hands were badly burned had walked into Lewisham Police Station, apparently to confess to being the killer. He was told to wait in line at the reception by a civilian worker for five minutes. A witness reported him saying "I've got third degree fucking burns and they are not doing anything about it." He was released from hospital and interviewed in custody by the police. Meanwhile, 600 students, on 7 July demonstrated against the murders in Clermont-Ferrand, France. The group led by Mayor Serge Godart, included teachers, local residents and children that carried a huge banner "Pour Lolo et Gab" ("For Lolo and Gab").

==== Inquest ====
A Greenwich Magistrates' Court's judge, on the afternoon of 8 July, granted the police's request for an extension of the investigation, by issuing a 36 hours "warrant of further detention." Accordingly, Southwark Coroner's Court's Doreen Lawrence adjourned the coroner's inquest for 28 days pending police inquiries.

==== Court appearance and other arrests ====
On 10 July, Nigel Edward Farmer, unemployed and without fixed address, was charged with both murders, arson and attempting to pervert the course of justice when he appeared before Greenwich Magistrates' Court. Bench chairman Phil Rogers ordered his remand in custody until 16 October for his appearance at the Old Bailey. Wearing a white sweatshirt, a tracksuit top with rolled up sleeves and white tracksuit bottoms, and his head shaved, he stood in the dock with two security guards. No application for bail was filed.

On 11 July 2008 it was reported by ITN that another man had been arrested in connection with the murders. Armed police arrested Daniel "Dano" Sonnex, aged 23, in Peckham, south-east London, after Scotland Yard issued an alert to trace him. Described as "extremely dangerous" he was detained and investigated after his brother, Bernard, 35 and a woman, 25, handed themselves to the police. Sonnex had previously been detained regarding serious, violent incidents. His parents, Kathleen and Bernard, lived in a terraced house in New Cross.

Sonnex was charged on 12 July 2008 with murder and perverting the course of justice. He appeared at Wimbledon Magistrates' Court on 14 July. Sonnex's brother, Bernard, 35, and a woman, aged 25, had been released on bail, to return in July and August, respectively, pending further investigation. Police were also granted more time to question a man of 23 on the murders. Dano Sonnex appeared before Wimbledon magistrates and was later returned to custody until 20 October to appear at the Old Bailey.

The trial of Daniel Sonnex and Nigel Farmer began on 24 April 2009 at the Old Bailey.

The jury began to consider their verdict on 29 May 2009. Impact statements were given by the prosecutor.

On 4 June 2009, Sonnex and Farmer were found guilty of murder, Sonnex was sentenced to serve a minimum of 40 years in prison, and Farmer was ordered to stay behind bars for at least 35 years. Sonnex should have been in prison at the time of the murders but had been set free due to an administrative error. David Scott, the chief officer of London Probation, resigned in March 2009 after an investigation began into why Sonnex had not been recalled to prison. While the UK Justice Secretary Jack Straw apologised to the families over the blunders which left Sonnex free to commit the crime; the families announced their intentions to commence legal proceedings against the authorities.

== See also ==
- New Cross house fire
