= Darline Nsoki =

French basketball player (born 1989)

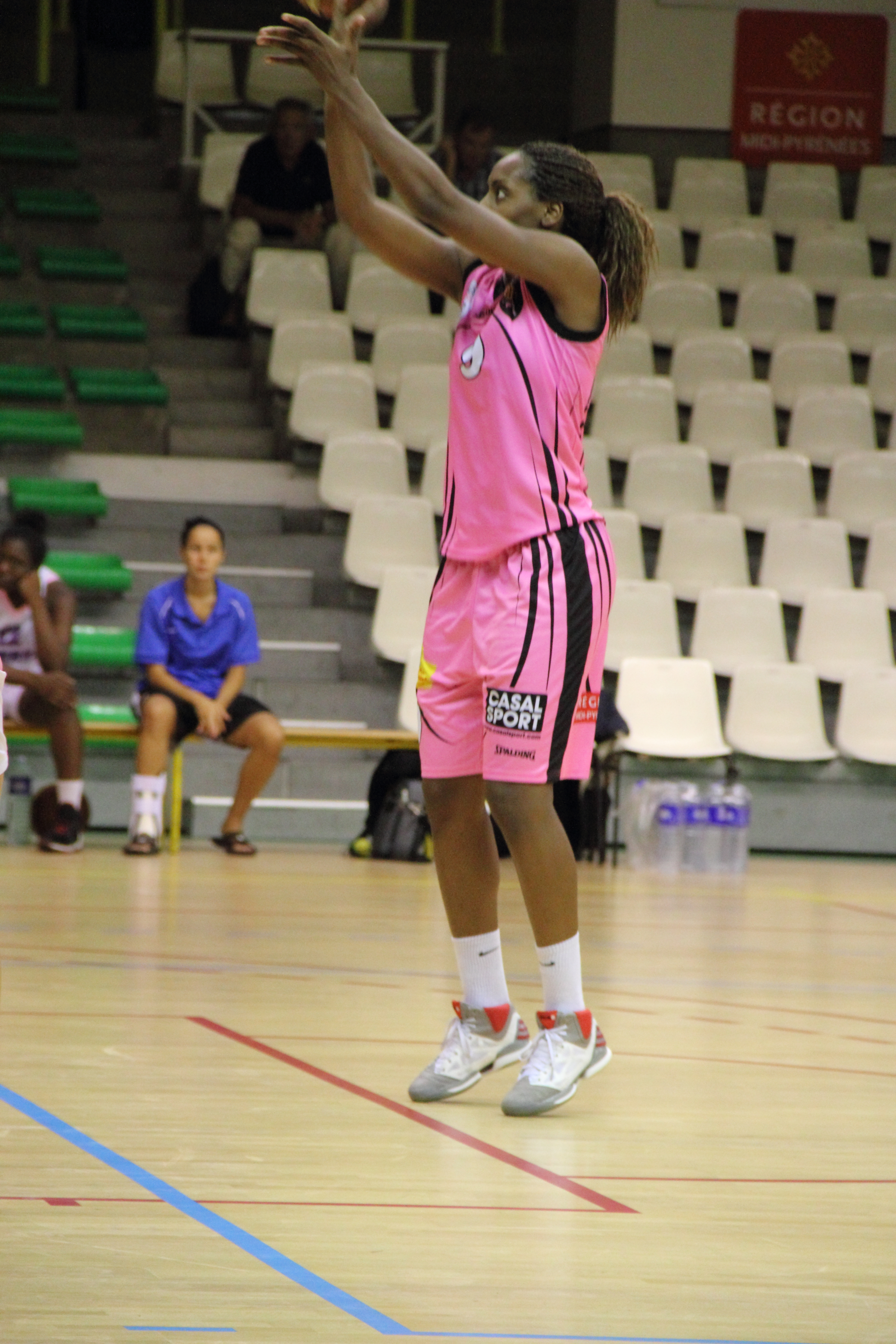
Darline Nsoki in 2012

Darline Nsoki (born 9 November 1989 in Clermont-Ferrand, France) is a French basketball player who plays for club Tarbes of the League feminine de basket, the top league of basketball for women in France.

== Career ==
After a year in Ligue Féminine de Basketball (Women's Basketball League), she returned to Ligue féminine 2 in Toulouse. However, due to a road accident before the start of the championship, her season (6 points and 3.1 rebounds) is truncated, hence the decision to resume in 2013-2014 in Ligue 2 in Strasbourg.

With 11.1 points and 7.6 rebounds in 2014-2015, she extended another season in Alsace.
