= Darlene =

Darlene may refer to:

- Darlene (given name), people with the given name Darlene
- Darlene (artist), American artist formerly known as Darlene Pekul
- "Darlene" (Led Zeppelin song)
- "Darlene" (T. Graham Brown song)
