= INP =

INP may stand for:

- INP (database), an early database system developed at the University of California, Berkeley
- Integrated National Police, a forerunner of the Philippine National Police
- Illinois Newspaper Project
- Industry and Business Party (Industri- og Næringspartiet), a Norwegian political party
- Budker Institute of Nuclear Physics
- National Polytechnic Institutes (France) (French: Instituts Nationaux Polytechniques)
- Peruvian Navy (ICAO air service code: INP), see List of airline codes (P)
- Iñapari language (ISO 639 language code: inp)
- Indium phosphide (InP)
- InPage (file extension: .inp) a word processor and page layout program
- EPANET (file extension: .inp) a geographic information system for modelling water distribution systems
- Ice nucleaction particle

== See also ==
- INP10, a protein
- 1-NP (disambiguation)
- INPS (disambiguation)
- IPN (disambiguation)
- NP (disambiguation)
- LNP (disambiguation)
- nip (disambiguation)
- NPI (disambiguation)
- PNI (disambiguation)
- Pin (disambiguation)
