= HEC Morocco =

Coordinates: 33°57′27″N 6°52′50″W

- École des Hautes Études Commerciales du Maroc
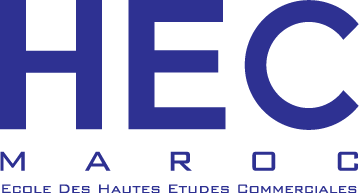
- Type: Private higher education institution
- Established: 18 October 1988
- Founder: Abdelouahab El Kouhen
- Affiliations: Accredited by the Ministry of Higher Education, Training of Executives, and Scientific Research (Decisions No. 25/88 and 70/93)
- President: Ilham Skalli Housseini
- Faculty: 75
- Students: 450
- Undergraduates: Business Administration, Communication and Marketing
- Postgraduates: Marketing and Distribution Management, Accounting, Control and Audit (CCA), Finance and Banking, Business Administration and Strategy
- Location: Rabat, Morocco
- Language: French, English, Arabic
- Website: http://www.hec.ac.ma

HEC Morocco, officially known as École des Hautes Études Commerciales du Maroc, is a Moroccan business school within private higher education. Established in 1988, the institution focuses on finance, marketing, communication, distribution, accounting, control, audit, and strategy. HEC Morocco offers accredited Bachelor's and master's degrees.

Since 2015, the school has been located in Hay Ryad, Rabat's new business center, emphasizing careers in marketing, communication, management, and finance.

== Undergraduate Programs ==
- Business Administration
- Communication and Marketing

== Graduate Programs ==
- Marketing and Distribution Management
- Accounting, Control and Audit (CCA)
- Finance and Banking

== Accreditation ==
In Morocco, accreditation is a voluntary process undertaken by higher education institutions to obtain recognition from the state for the quality of a specific program. Diplomas awarded in accredited programs may be recognized as equivalent to national diplomas under regulatory conditions. The Business Administration (Bac + 3) program is among the first accredited cohorts recognized by the state. All programs at HEC Morocco are accredited.

== Partnerships ==
France

- Blaise Pascal University (UBP) - Clermont Ferrand
- Groupe Sup de Co La Rochelle
- Institut Euro-Méditerranéen en Science du Risque (IEMSR) - Sophia-Antipolis (French Riviera)

United States

- University of California, Riverside
