= NPIS =

NPIS may refer to:

- New Pakistan International School, Hawally, Kuwait; founded in 1997
- National Poisons Information Service, of the United Kingdom
- National Police Immigration Service (Norway)

== See also ==
- NPI (disambiguation)
