= INPS =

INPS may refer to:

- Istituto nazionale della previdenza sociale (Italian: National Institute for Social Security) of Italy
- In Practice Systems Limited, British health informatics company
- Integrated Nepal Power System, a component of the Nepal Electricity Authority
- Indonesian National Press and Publicity Service (INPS), a component of Antara (news agency)
- National Polytechnic Institutes (France) (INPs; French: Instituts Nationaux Polytechniques)

== See also ==
- INP (disambiguation)
