= University of Auvergne =

Public university in Clermont-Ferrand, Auvergne, France

- Université d'Auvergne
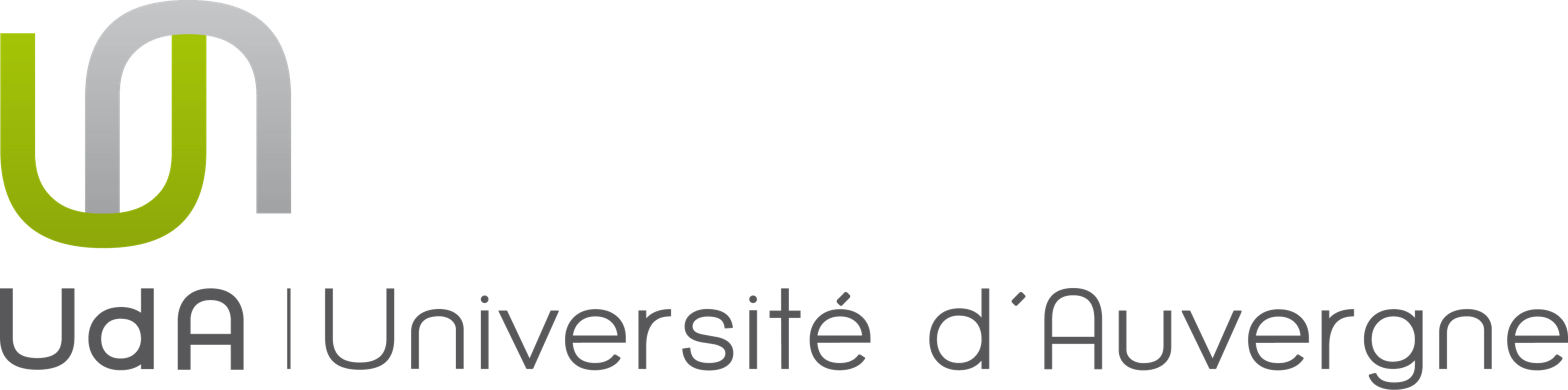
- Logo of the University of Auvergne
- Motto: "Made in UdA"
- Type: Public
- Active: 1519–2016
- President: Philippe Dulbecco
- Dean: Phillippe Dulbecco
- Students: 16,644
- Location: 49, Boulevard François-Mitterrand, Clermont Ferrand, France, Clermont-Ferrand, Auvergne, France; 45°46′14″N 3°5′19″E
- Website: http://www.u-clermont1.fr/

The University of Auvergne (French: Université d'Auvergne), also known as Université Clermont-Ferrand I, was a French public university, based in Clermont-Ferrand, in the region of Auvergne. It was under the Academy of Clermont-Ferrand. It was the head of PRES Clermont Université consortium; PRES being the league of elite universities of France. On 1 January 2017, the university merged with Blaise Pascal University to form the University Clermont Auvergne.

The Université d’Auvergne was founded in 1519 and as such in 1806 as a medical school. It became the Université d’Auvergne Clermont-Ferrand 1 on March 16, 1976.

The university has a status of EPSCSP, which is the highest French accreditation. This leads to high emphasis over the professional and research areas of the university. A comprehensive institution, it offers more than 60 national degrees in Medicine, Pharmacy, Dentistry, Law and Forensics, Economics and Politics, Management and Administration, and Technology.

The university was constantly ranked as a leading academic institution by various French academicians and newspapers, most notably Le Figaro.

== History ==
The first university existed between the 12th century and the end of the 15th century to Billom, near Clermont, with up to 2,000 students. At the beginning of the 16th century, the Bishop of Clermont, Thomas Duprat installed a university library. The King established the University in February 1519, but following protests by Charles III of Bourbon and the University of Paris, it was closed in 1520. In 1681, the King authorized the creation of a medical college in Clermont. The Faculty of Arts was founded in 1808, inaugurated in May 1810 in the hospital Charitains (demolished in 1906), but it is improvised from the Restoration in September 1815.

During the Second World War, the university hosted Clermont students and professors from the University of Strasbourg, fleeing the German occupation. The university was also severely affected: On 25 November 1943, the buildings were surrounded by the Gestapo, with orders to arrest deans, students and those from Alsace-Lorraine, and they all could be related to the resistance. Nearly 50 students and teachers were arrested and Paul Collomp, a professor of the faculty of Literature, was even killed by a gunshot.

Large differences were created in particular political interventions in the implementation of the Reform of 1969 (Act Faure), but it was not until 1976 that the University Clermont only split into two separate institutions, Clermont II retrieving Literature, the Humanities and the Applied Sciences, the Natural Science and Technology, University Clermont I keeping it on the Law, Economics, the Medical and IUT.

After the split, the relations between the two universities have been timid or nonexistent, but the situation has gradually improved. Today the two institutions have significantly come closer together and collaborate on some courses. The creation of PRES Clermont Université in May 2008 by the University of Auvergne, the Blaise Pascal University, the National School of Agricultural Engineers from Clermont-Ferrand (ENITA), the Ecole Nationale Supérieure of Chemistry of Clermont Ferrand (ENSCCF) and the French Institute of Advanced Mechanics (IFMA) is dedicated to ensuring the visibility and attractiveness of the university campus Clermont internationally.

== Components ==
With 15,000 students, including 3,000 foreign students, it consists of five faculties and 3 institutes:

- Faculty of Law and Political Science at Clermont-Ferrand
- Faculty of Economics and Management
- Faculty of Medicine
- Faculty of Pharmacy
- Faculty of Dental Surgery
- IUT (Engineering Sciences, Computer Networks, Multimedia, Biology, Management)
- IUP "Management and Business Management"
- Institute of Preparation for General Administration (IPAG)

== Research Centers ==
With twenty-three laboratories as principal four UMR (2 INSERM, CNRS 1, 1 INRA), the potential for research is mainly focused on Life sciences and Health (61.3%). The tertiary sector, Economics-Management accounts for 34.4% and the Technology sector 4.3%. In 2004, the university saw a rapid improvement in the framework and courses were significantly altered to higher standards, particularly in fields of Medicine, Law and Economics-Management. A Bilingual Bachelor program in Business-Management program (French: Licence Bilingue Economie-Gestion) was launched and receives presently the highest funding in the Economics Department. It has developed a consortium with HEC Paris, University Paris X, Carnegie Mellon University and Royal Melbourne Institute of Technology, Australia. It shall begin from 2011. The Economics-Management department has tie ups for student internships with various institutions, namely UNESCO and in Saint-Etienne, which houses the headquarters of various French and international companies.

== Board of directors ==
- Philippe Dulbecco, Member of Board of Directors of CPU.
- Vice-Chairman of the Board of Directors: Michel Madesclaire
- Vice-Chairman of the Scientific and Research: Alain Eschalier
- Vice-Chairman of the Board of Studies and University Life: Fabien Feschet
- Associate Vice-President, Finance and Real Estate: Francoise Dupont-Marillia
- Vice-President with responsibility for innovation, and entrepreneurship development: Pierre-Charles Romond
- Vice-President with responsibility for training and policy documentation: Lionel Colombel
- Vice-President with responsibility for international development policy: Jacky Mathonnat
- Executive Vice President for Information Technology and Communication for Teaching, Research, Administration and Management: Olivier Guinaldo
- Executive Vice President for Communications and Cultural Policy: Stéphane Calipel
- Executive Vice President for Legal Affairs: Didier Valette
- Vice President Student: Thomas Guerreau

== Sources ==
- Site officiel de l'Université Clermont-Ferrand-I

== See also ==
- University of Clermont-Ferrand
- Blaise Pascal University
- List of modern universities in Europe (1801–1945)
- List of public universities in France by academy
