= Non-pharmaceutical intervention (epidemiology) =

Methods that do not involve pharmaceuticals that reduce epidemic spread

In epidemiology, a non-pharmaceutical intervention (NPI), also known as a public health and social measure, is a method used to reduce the spread of an epidemic disease without requiring pharmaceutical drug treatments. Examples of non-pharmaceutical interventions that reduce the spread of infectious diseases include wearing a face mask and staying away from sick people.

The US Centers for Disease Control and Prevention (CDC) points to personal, community, and environmental interventions. NPIs have been recommended for pandemic influenza at both local and global levels and studied at large scale during the 2009 swine flu pandemic and the COVID-19 pandemic. NPIs are typically used in the period between the emergence of an epidemic disease and the deployment of an effective vaccine.

== Types ==
Choosing to stay home to prevent the spread of symptoms of a potential sickness, covering coughs and sneezes, and washing one's hands regularly, are all examples of non-pharmaceutical interventions. Another example is when administrators of schools, workplaces, community areas, etc., take proper preventive actions and remind people to take precautions when need be in order to avoid the spread of disease. Most NPIs are simple, requiring little effort to put into practice, and, if implemented correctly, have the potential to save lives.

=== Personal protective measures ===
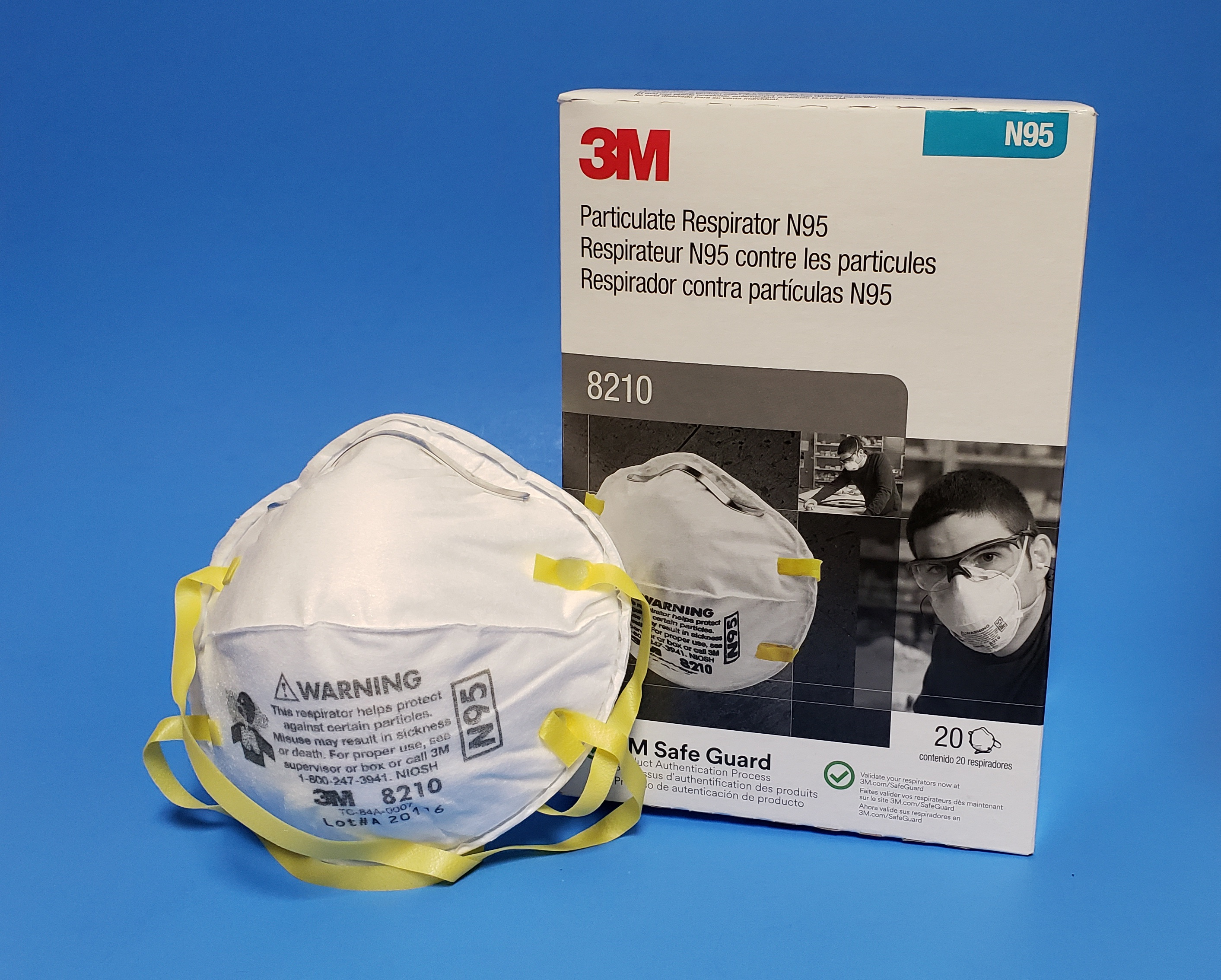
An N95 respirator

==== Hand hygiene ====
Hand washing (or handwashing), also called hand hygiene, is the process of cleaning the hands with soap or handwash and water to eliminate bacteria, viruses, dirt, microorganisms, and other potentially harmful substances. Drying of the washed hands is part of the process as wet and moist hands are more easily recontaminated. If soap and water are unavailable, hand sanitizer that is at least 60% (v/v) alcohol in water can be used as long as hands are not visibly excessively dirty or greasy. Hand hygiene is central to preventing the spread of infectious diseases in home and everyday life settings. Meta-analyses have shown that regular hand washing in community settings can significantly reduce respiratory and gastrointestinal infections.

==== Respiratory etiquette ====
In the past, suggestions have been made that covering the mouth and nose, like with an elbow, tissue, or hand, would be a viable measure towards reducing the transmissions of airborne diseases. This method of source control was suggested, but not empirically tested, in the "Control of Airborne Infection" section of a 1974 publication of Riley's Airborne Infection. NIOSH also noted that the use of a tissue as source control, in their guidelines for TB, had not been tested as of 1992.

In 2013, Gustavo et al. looked into the effectiveness of various methods of source control, including via the arm, via a tissue, via bare hands, and via a surgical mask. They concluded that simply covering a cough was not an effective method of stopping transmission, and a surgical mask was not effective at reducing the amount of displaced droplets detected compared to the other rudimentary forms of source control. Another paper noted that the fit of a face mask matters in its source control performance. (However, note that OSHA 29 CFR 1910.134 does not cover the fit of face masks other than NIOSH-approved respirators.)

==== Face masks ====
While source control protects others from transmission arising from the wearer, personal protective equipment protects the wearer themselves. Cloth face masks can be used for source control (as a last resort) but are not considered personal protective equipment as they have low filter efficiency (generally varying between 2–60%), although they are easy to obtain and reusable after washing. There are no standards or regulation for self-made cloth face masks, and source control on a well-fitted cloth mask is worse than a surgical mask.

Surgical masks are designed to protect against splashes and sprays, but do not provide complete respiratory protection from germs and other contaminants because of the loose fit between the surface of the face mask and the face. Surgical masks are regulated by various national standards to have high bacterial filtration efficiency (BFE). N95/N99/N100 masks and other filtering facepiece respirators can provide source control in addition to respiratory protection, but respirators with an unfiltered exhalation valve may not provide source control and require additional measures to filter exhalation air when source control is required.

=== Environmental measures ===
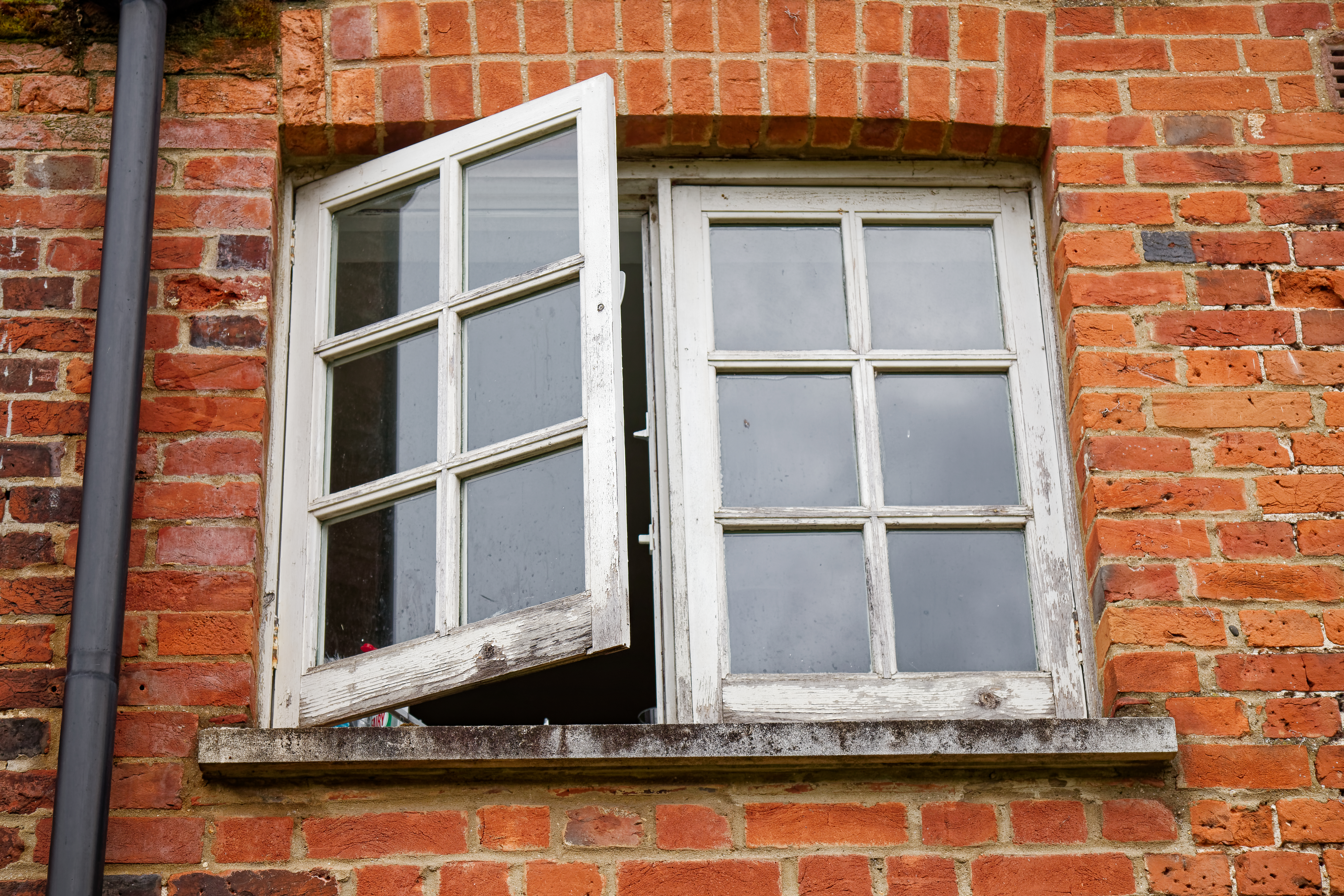
An open window can reduce infection by increasing ventilation, a cheap NPI.

==== Surface and object cleaning ====
Germs can survive outside the body on hard surfaces for periods ranging from hours to weeks, depending on the virus and environmental conditions. The disinfection of high-touch surfaces with substances such as bleach or alcohol kills germs, preventing indirect contact transmission. Dirty surfaces should be washed before the use of disinfectant.

==== Ultraviolet lights ====
Ultraviolet (UV) light can be used to destroy micro-organisms that exist in the environment. The installation of UV light fixtures can be costly and time consuming; it is unlikely that they could be used at the outbreak of an epidemic. There are possible health concerns involving UV light, as it may cause cancer and eye problems. The WHO does not recommend its use.

==== Increased ventilation ====
Increased ventilation of a room through opening a window or through mechanized ventilation systems may reduce transmission within the room. Although opening a window may introduce allergens and air pollution, or, in some climates, cold air, it is overall a cheap and effective type of intervention, and its advantages probably outweigh its disadvantages.

==== Modifying humidity ====
Viruses such as influenza and coronavirus thrive in cold, dry environments, and increasing the humidity of a room may reduce their transmission. Higher humidity, however, may cause mold and mildew, which may in turn cause respiratory problems. Humidifiers are also expensive and will probably be in short supply at the start of an epidemic.

=== Social distancing measures ===
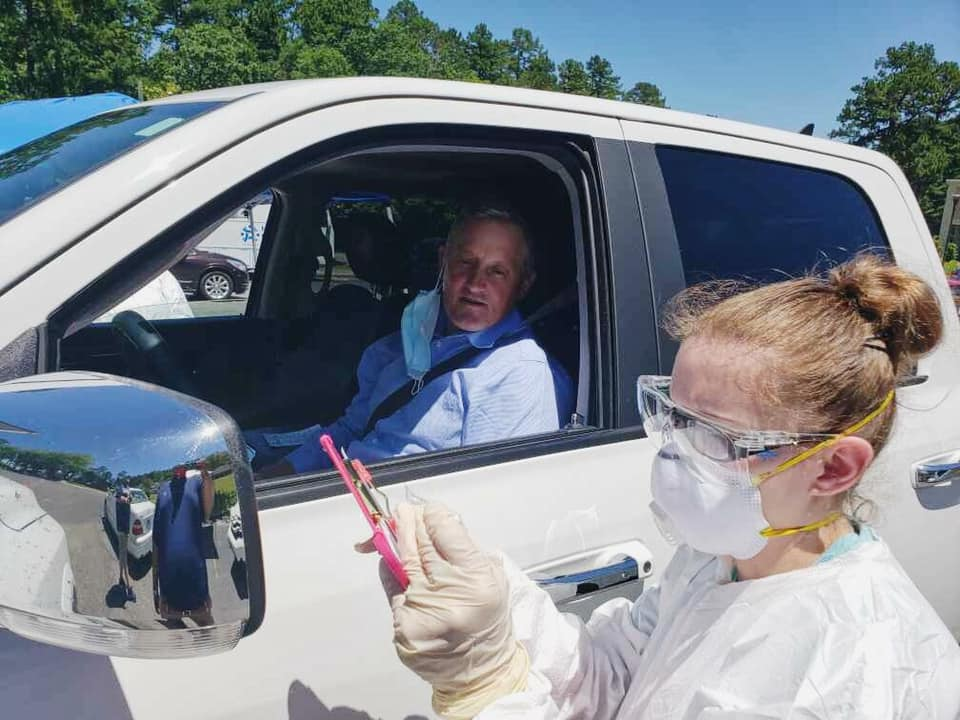
COVID-19 testing

==== Contact tracing ====
In public health, contact tracing is the process of identifying people who may have been exposed to an infected person ("contacts") and subsequent collection of further data to assess transmission. By tracing the contacts of infected individuals, testing them for infection, and isolating or treating the infected, this public health tool aims to reduce infections in the population. In addition to infection control, contact tracing serves as a means to identify high-risk and medically vulnerable populations who might be exposed to infection and facilitate appropriate medical care. In doing so, public health officials utilize contact tracing to conduct disease surveillance and prevent outbreaks. In cases of diseases of uncertain infectious potential, contact tracing is also sometimes performed to learn about disease characteristics, including infectiousness. Contact tracing is not always the most efficient method of addressing infectious disease. In areas of high disease prevalence, screening or focused testing may be more cost-effective.

==== Isolation of sick individuals ====
In health care facilities, isolation represents one of several measures that can be taken to implement in infection control: the prevention of communicable diseases from being transmitted from a patient to other patients, health care workers, and visitors, or from outsiders to a particular patient (reverse isolation). Various forms of isolation exist, in some of which contact procedures are modified, and others in which the patient is kept away from all other people. In a system devised, and periodically revised, by the U.S. Centers for Disease Control and Prevention (CDC), various levels of patient isolation comprise application of one or more formally described "precaution".

==== Quarantine of exposed individuals ====
Quarantine involves the voluntary or imposed confinement of potentially non-ill persons who have been exposed to an illness, regardless of whether they have contracted it. Quarantine will often happen at home, but it may happen elsewhere, such as aboard ships (maritime quarantine) or airlines (onboard quarantine). Like isolation of sick individuals, forced quarantine of exposed individuals brings with it ethical concerns, although in this case the concerns may be greater; quarantine involves restricting the movement of those who may otherwise be well, and in some cases may even cause them greater risk if they are quarantining with the sick person to whom they were exposed, such as a sick family member or roommate with whom they live. Like isolation, quarantine brings with it financial risk, because of work absenteeism.

==== School measures and closures ====
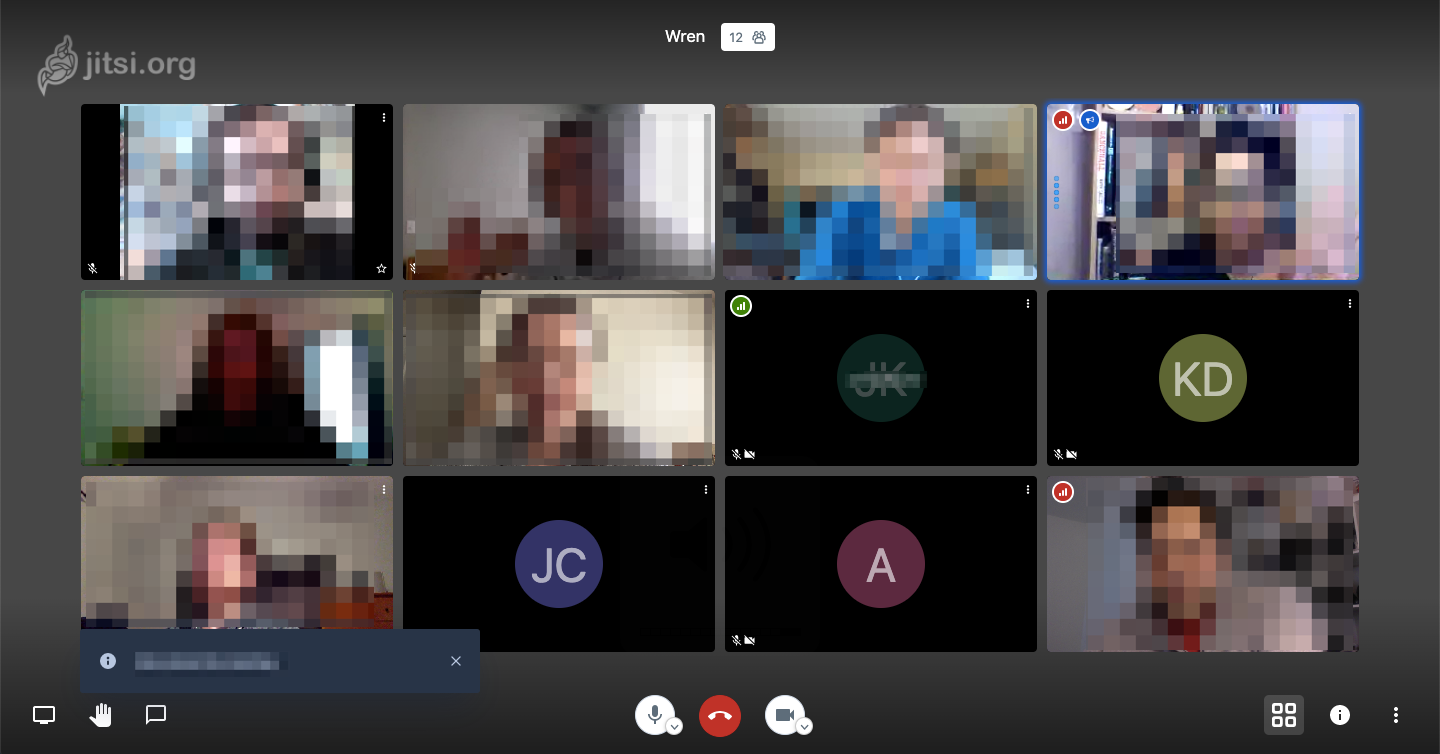
Teleconferencing is a way of facilitating the NPI measure of remote learning and remote work.

Measures taken involving schools range from making changes to operations within schools to complete school closures. Lesser measures may involve reducing the density of students, such as by distancing desks, cancelling activities, reducing class sizes, or staggering class schedules. Sick students may be isolated from the greater student body, such as by having them stay at home or otherwise segregate them from other students.

More drastic measures include class dismissal, in which classes are cancelled but the school stays open to provide childcare to some children, and complete school closure. Both measures may be either reactive or proactive: In a reactive case, the measure takes place after an outbreak has occurred in the school; in a proactive case, the measure takes place in order to prevent spread within the community.

Closures of schools may affect the families of affected children, especially low-income families. Parents may be forced to miss work to care for their children, affecting financial stability; children may also miss out on free school meals, causing nutritional concerns. Long absences from schools because of closures can also have negative effects on students' education.

However, in the months following the onset of the COVID-19 pandemic, instead of closures, remote learning was turned to as an intervention against infection by SARS-CoV-2 in the days before vaccines.

==== Workplace measures and closures ====
Measures taken in the workplace include: remote work; paid leave; staggering shifts such that arrival, exit, and break times are different for each employee; reduced contact; and extended weekends.

Workplace closure is a more drastic measure. The financial effect of workplace closure on both the individual and the economy can be severe. When remote work is not possible, such as in essential services, businesses may not be able to comply with guidelines. In one simulation study school closure coupled with 50% absenteeism in the workplace would have had the highest financial impact of all the scenarios studied, although some studies have found that the combination would be effective in reducing both the attack rate and the height of an epidemic.

One benefit of workplace closure is that when used in conjunction with school closures they avoid the need for parents to make childcare arrangements for children who are staying away from school.

The WHO recommends workplace closure in the case of extraordinarily severe epidemics and pandemics.

==== Avoiding crowding ====
Avoiding crowding may involve: avoiding crowded areas such as shopping centres and transportation hubs; closing public spaces and banning large gatherings, such as sports events or religious activities; or setting a limit on small gatherings, such as limiting them to no more than a few people. There are negative consequences to the banning of gatherings; banning cultural or religious activities, for example, may prevent access to support in a time of crisis. Gatherings also allow sharing of information, which can provide comfort and reduce fear.

The WHO recommends this intervention in moderate and severe epidemics and pandemics.

=== Travel-related measures ===
Travel restrictions are another type of NPI.

==== Travel advice ====
Travel advice involves notifying potential travelers that they may be entering a zone that is affected by a disease outbreak. It allows informed decisions to be made before travel, and it increases awareness when the traveler is in the destination country. Public awareness campaigns have been used in the past for areas affected by infectious diseases such as dengue, malaria, Middle East respiratory syndrome, and H1N1 influenza. Although such awareness campaigns may reduce exposure among those traveling abroad, they may cause economic impact, owing to reduced travel in countries about which the advice has been issued. Overall, this intervention type is considered both feasible and acceptable.

==== Entry and exit screening ====
Entry and exit screening involves screening travelers at ports of entry for symptoms of illness. Measures include: health declarations, in which travelers make a declaration that they have not recently had symptoms of illness; visual inspections of the traveler; and the use of non-contact thermography, in which a device such as a thermographic camera is used to measure the traveler's body temperature, in order to determine if they have a fever. Such a method may be circumvented by the traveler through the use of antipyretics before travel in order to reduce fever. More intensive measures such as molecular diagnostics and point-of-care rapid antigen detection tests may also be used, but they carry a high resource cost and may not be applicable to a large number of travelers. A substantial number of resources may be needed in order to train staff and acquire equipment.

Although there is probably no harm to the traveler by the use of this type of intervention, a limitation of it is that travelers may be asymptomatic on arrival and symptoms may not show until several days after entry, at which point they may have already exposed others to their illness. There are also ethical concerns involving invading the privacy of the traveler. Screening is considered by the WHO to be both acceptable and feasible, though they did not recommend its use in the case of influenza outbreak due to its inefficacy in identifying asymptomatic individuals.

==== Internal travel restrictions ====
Travel within a country may be restricted in order to delay the spread of disease. Restriction of travel within a country is likely to slow the spread of disease, but not prevent it entirely. Its use would be most effective at the start of a localized and extraordinarily severe pandemic for only a short period of time. It would only be effective if the measures were strict: while a 90% restriction was projected to delay spread by one or two weeks, a 75% restriction saw no effect. An analysis of the spread of influenza in America following complete airline closures due to the September 11 attacks saw reduced spread by 13 days compared with previous years.

Restricting travel brings both ethical, and in many countries, legal challenges. Freedom of movement is considered in many places to be a human right, and its restriction may have an adverse effect, particularly among vulnerable populations, such as migrant workers and those traveling to seek medical attention. Although 37% of the Member States of the WHO included internal travel restrictions as part of their pandemic preparedness plan as of 2019, some of those countries may face legal challenges in implementing them, because of their own laws. Such restrictions may also bring economic effects because of disruption in the supply chain.

==== Border closure ====
Border closure is a measure that involves complete or severe restriction of travel across borders. This had a beneficial effect in delaying the spread of cases of influenza during the 1918 influenza pandemic, and was predicted to delay epidemic spread between Hong Kong and mainland China by 3.5 weeks. While border closure is expected to slow the spread of infection, it is not expected to reduce the duration of an epidemic. Strict border closure in island nations could be effective, although supply chain problems may cause adverse disruptions.

Supply chain problems due to border closure are likely to cause disruption of essential goods, such as food and medications, as well as serious economic effects. They may have adverse effects on the daily lives of individuals. Border closure also has serious ethical implications, because, like internal travel restrictions, it involves restricting the movements of individuals. It should only be used as a voluntary measure to the maximum extent possible. There may also be stigmatization of individuals from affected areas.

Border closure would be most feasible at the very start of a pandemic. The WHO recommended it only in extraordinary circumstances, and asked that they be notified by any nation implementing it. Experiments in the UK and US during COVID‑19 showed that while higher perceived pandemic threat modestly increased public support for border closures, reminders of the WHO's guidance against such measures and legal obligations under the International Health Regulations significantly reduced that support.

== 1918 influenza pandemic ==
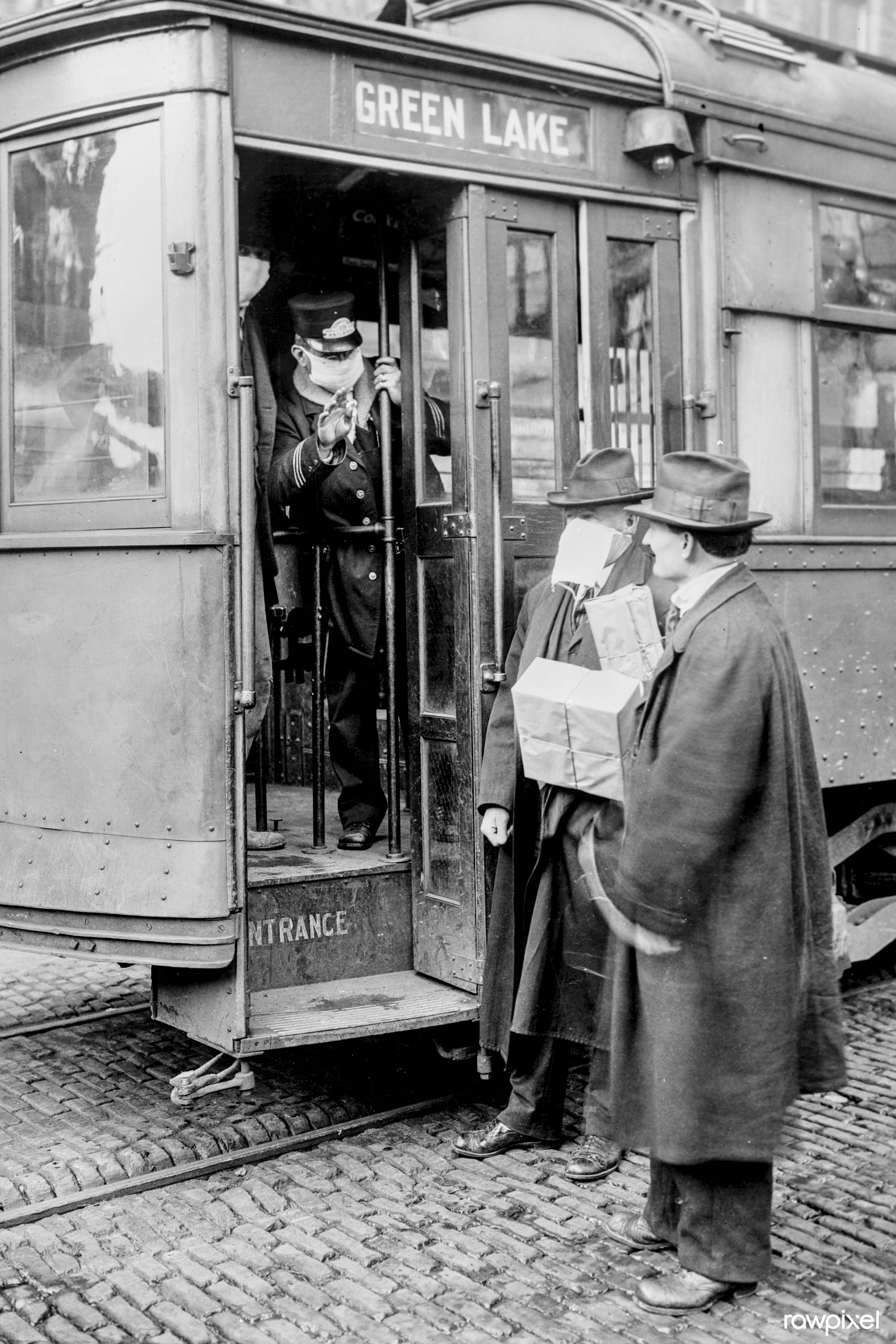
Early use of face masks during the Spanish flu

Non-pharmaceutical interventions were widely adopted during the 1918 flu outbreak – most famously, the radical quarantine of Gunnison, Colorado resulted in sparing the town the worst of the earlier waves of the pandemic. Interventions used included the wearing of face masks, isolation, quarantine, personal hygiene, use of disinfectants, and limits on public gatherings. At the time, the science behind NPIs was new, and was not applied consistently in every area. Retroactive studies on the outbreak have shown that the measures were effective in mitigating the spread of the infection.

The use of non-pharmaceutical interventions during the 1918 flu pandemic also gave rise to new societal concerns. There was a growing awareness of "overreacting" and "under-reacting" among U.S. public health authorities, and these opposing perspectives often added to the uncertainties inherent in the epidemic. Likewise, public perceptions varied with respect to adherence to public health guidelines, giving rise to terms such as "mask slackers" and "careless consumptives."

== COVID-19 ==
COVID-19 is a disease caused by the SARS-CoV-2 virus, which spread from China, creating a pandemic. Several COVID-19 vaccines are now being used, 6.54 billion doses having been administered worldwide as of 12 October 2021.

In the early stages of the COVID-19 pandemic, before vaccines had been developed, NPIs were key in mitigating infections and reducing COVID-19-related mortality. Some NPIs remained in place or were reinstituted for a time after vaccine rollout. One report identified over 500 specific NPIs for controlling transmission and spread of the SARS-CoV-2 virus; most of these have been tried in practice. Evidence suggests that highly effective strategies include closing schools and universities, banning large gatherings, and wearing face masks. A natural experiment study finds that a partial lockdown (with curfews) was just as effective as a full lockdown (with business closures) at reducing the spread of the virus.

=== Engineering controls ===
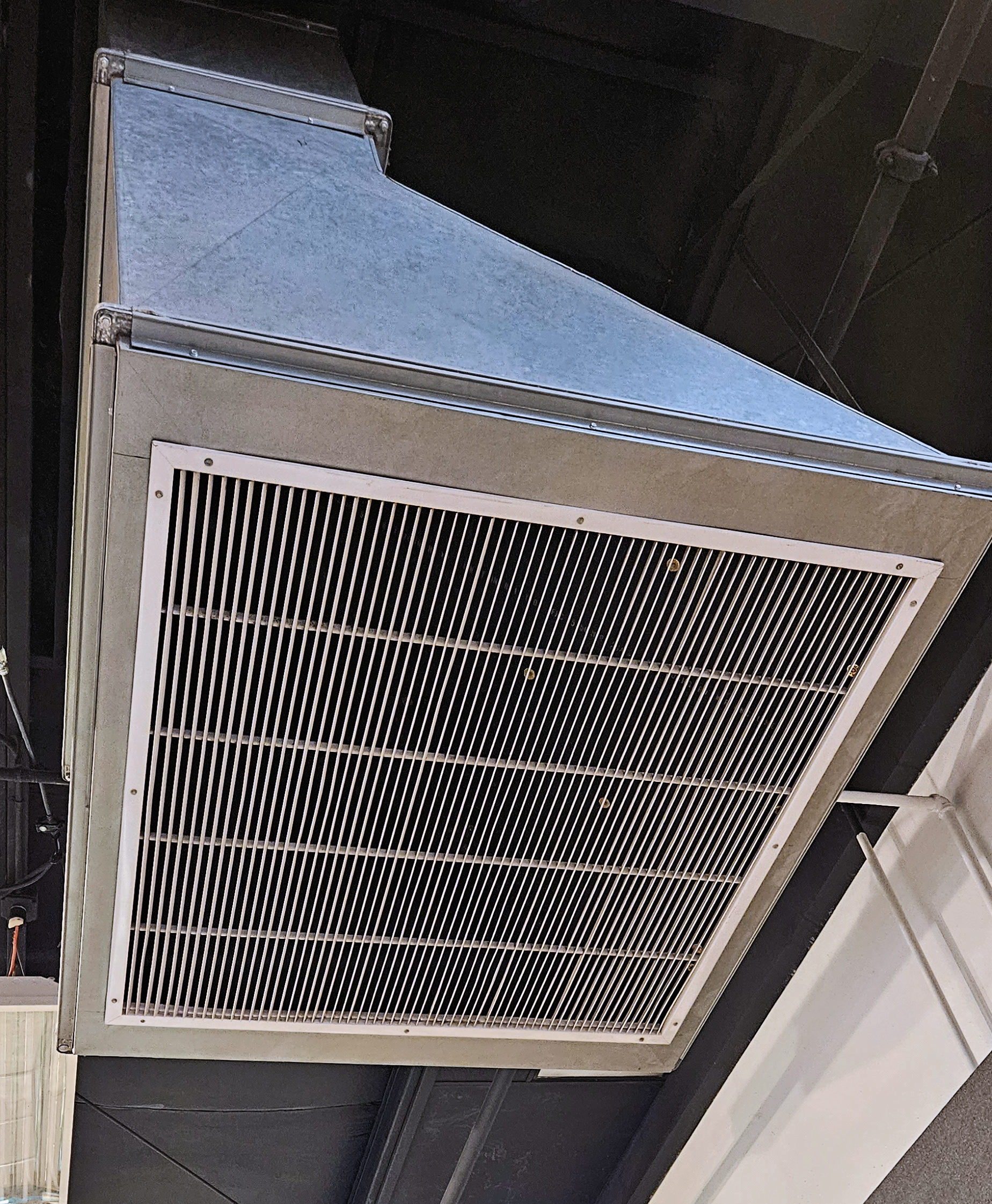
Upgrades to HVAC systems are an example of a non-pharmaceutical intervention for the prevention of disease, and should be designed to reach at least 5 air changes per hour (12 in hospitals).

NPIs are still key to mitigating infections. NPIs, which include engineering controls under the Hierarchy of hazard controls, do not require compliance with PPE mandates, or require administrative changes, like lockdowns, to prevent the spread of disease among the general public.

The CDC suggests that, in non-healthcare settings, building ventilation should be brought up to 5 air changes per hour, along with the use of MERV-13 filters, the use of air purifiers (air cleaners), and upper-room Ultraviolet germicidal irradiation (UVGI) to reduce the odds of infection and people coming down with COVID-19. The UVGI systems are said to be similar to the UVGI systems used against tuberculosis in the past in healthcare facilities. As for ventilation, a survey conducted under 1989 ASHRAE standards showed that, of the buildings constructed in prior years and surveyed, all but one did not meet the recommended 5 ACH.

Corsi–Rosenthal Boxes have been suggested as a viable temporary air cleaner. When tested by NIOSH, the boxes were found to reduce aerosols up to 73%, but most did not operate below noise standards.

==== Proposed controls ====
These fixtures have been suggested as forms of "engineering controls" in the Hierarchy of hazard controls:

- Instead of the use of UVGI, use of far-UVC lighting to inactivate the virus causing COVID-19.
- Use of ceiling fans to aid in the removal of viral aerosols in the air, and support other engineering control measures, particularly ventilation. One paper found that by using ceiling fans to mix the air, the particles involved in short-range transmission could drop significantly, at the cost of a small increase in the amount of particles involved in long-range transmission. However, for ceiling fans to be effective, the authors noted that occupancy in a given ventilated room should generally stay within ASHRAE 241 recommendations, at around 36-154 m^{3} ventilated air/hr/person.

== See also ==
- Flatten the curve
