= University of Clermont-Ferrand =

University in Auvergne, France (1896–1976)

The University of Clermont-Ferrand was a French university. It was founded in 1896, by merging of two existing faculties (Literature and Sciences) and a medical school.

In 1976, due to political issues, the university split into the University Clermont-Ferrand I (University of Auvergne) and University Clermont-Ferrand II (Blaise Pascal University). They later remerged as Clermont Auvergne University in 2017.

== See also ==
- List of split up universities
