= Polytechnic Institute of Clermont-Auvergne =

French university cluster

Coordinates: 45.7595573°N 3.1139096°E

Clermont Auvergne INP
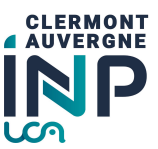
- Type: Grande école
- Established: 2021
- Affiliations: Clermont Auvergne University, Group INP
- Director General: Sophie Commereuc
- Students: 2700
- Location: Clermont-Ferrand, Auvergne-Rhône-Alpes, France
- Campus: Aubière
- Website: www.clermont-auvergne-inp.fr

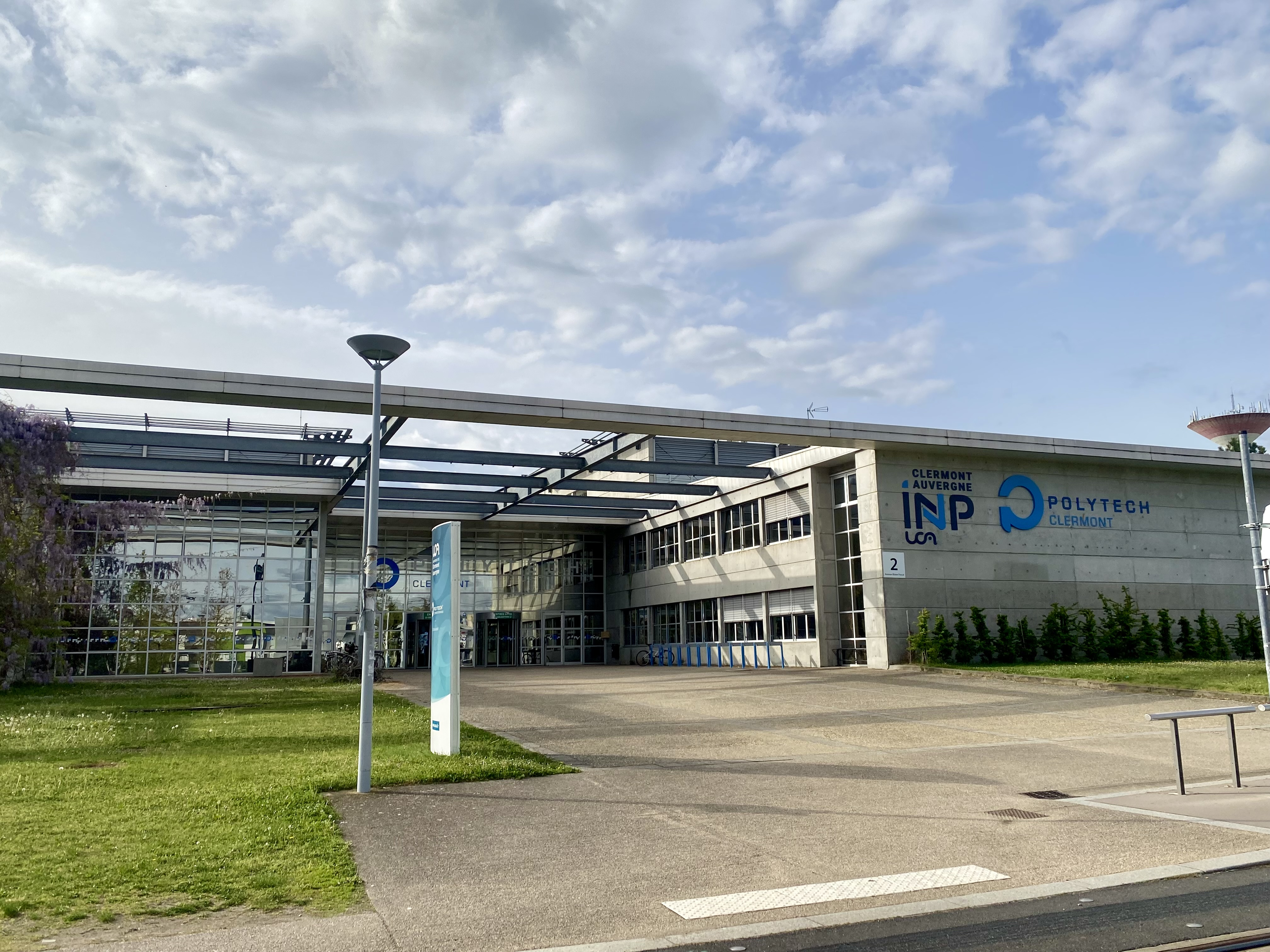
Clermont Auvergne INP - Polytech Clermont

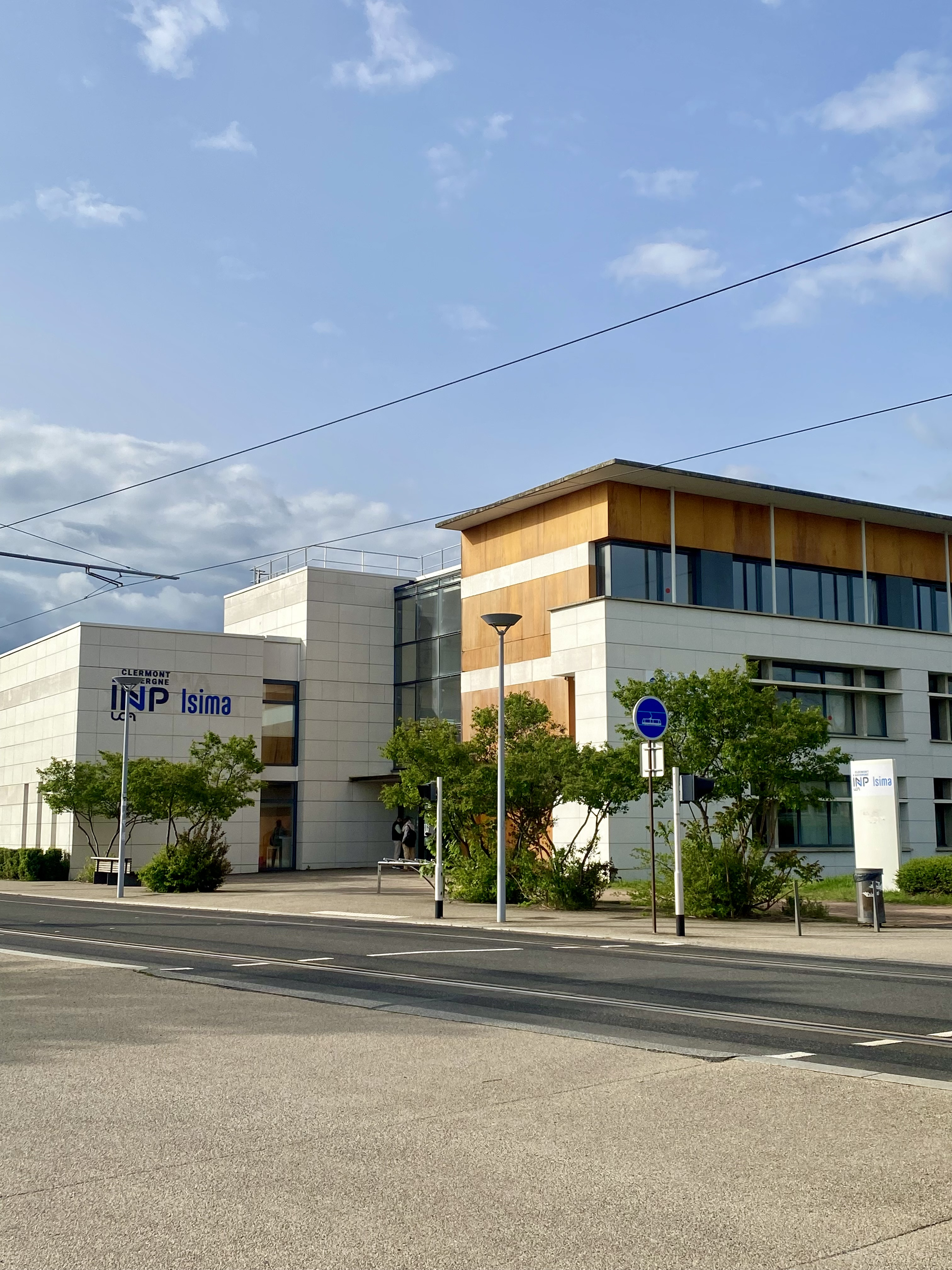
Clermont Auvergne INP - ISIMA

Clermont Auvergne INP (Institut national polytechnique Clermont-Auvergne) is a French technological university system consisting of three engineering graduate schools. Together with Grenoble INP, Toulouse INP, Bordeaux INP and Lorraine INP it is part of the INP Group. Clermont Auvergne INP is an autonomous member institute of the University of Clermont Auvergne. It is located on the science campus "Les Cézeaux" in the South of Clermont-Ferrand.

The institute is a Établissement public à caractère scientifique, culturel et professionnel.

== History ==
The institute traces its origins to the founding of the École Nationale Supérieure de Chimie de Clermont-Ferrand (ENSCCF) in 1911, now part of the SIGMA Clermont. Over the years, it has expanded and diversified its curriculum and research areas, eventually merging with other institutions based in Clermont-Ferrand in order to form the current Clermont Auvergne INP on January 1, 2021.

Currently the institute consists of three member schools: ISIMA, Polytech Clermont and SIGMA Clermont.

== Academics ==
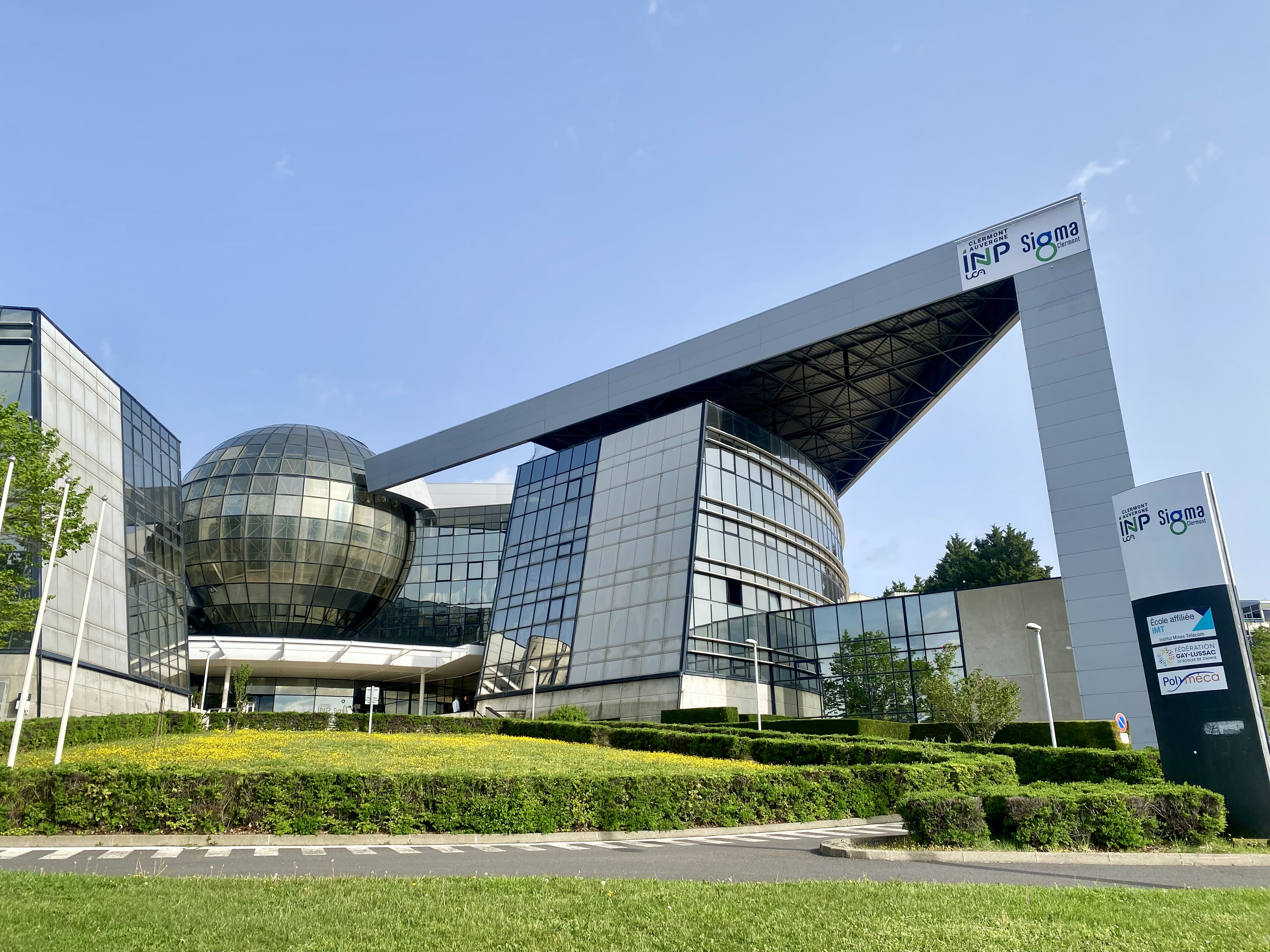
Clermont Auvergne INP - SIGMA Clermont

Clermont Auvergne INP offers engineering programs including graduate level and two-year engineering preparation programs. The institute is organized into several engineering graduate schools, each specializing in different fields:

- Polytech Clermont: biological engineering, electrical engineering, applied mathematics, systems engineering production, engineering physics or industrial engineering.
- ISIMA: Specializes in computer science and software engineering
- SIGMA Clermont: chemistry, chemical engineering, mechanical engineering, materials engineering, industrial engineering

A doctoral school ED SPI provides several PhD programs in engineering and sciences

The university teaching approach blends elements from both North American and French traditions. The program spans five years: the initial two years emphasize basic sciences (Classes préparatoires), followed by three years concentrated on engineering sciences (Diplôme d'ingénieur). Most students enroll immediately after the competitive exam (Concours) in year 3, although some may join directly after their high school degree (baccalauréat). Students customize their curriculum by selecting courses, supplemented by guided classwork (Travaux dirigés) and practical laboratory exercises (Travaux pratiques). Industrial experience through at least 3 different internships is mandatory for obtaining the engineering diploma.

All Clermont Auvergne INP engineering degrees are accredited by CTI and are equivalent to a master's degree (M.Sc.).

== Research ==
Clermont Auvergne INP is involved in research across various disciplines, including materials science, chemistry, computer science, and engineering.

Affiliated CNRS laboratories include ICCF, Institut Pascal and LIMOS

== International ==
Clermont Auvergne INP has formed partnerships with leading universities across Europe for student exchange and combined degree programs. It has furthermore partnered with many universities worldwide for exchanges.
