= NPI =

NPI may refer to:

== Institutes ==
- Non-profit institution
- Nationaal Pop Instituut: the Dutch Rock & Pop Institute
- National Policy Institute, an American white supremacist think tank
- New Policy Institute, a British think tank focusing on poverty
- Nordic Patent Institute, a patent search organisation for Nordic countries
- Northwest Progressive Institute, a liberal American think tank concerned with social policy
- Norwegian Polar Institute, performs environmental research in the polar regions

== Other uses ==
- Narcissistic Personality Inventory, a standard personality test for evaluating self-centredness
- National pollutant inventory
- National Provider Identifier
- Negative polarity item, grammatical form used during negation
- New Politics Initiative
- New product introduction
- Nickel pig iron
- Non-pharmaceutical intervention, health measures that are not centred on drug treatments
  - Non-pharmaceutical intervention (epidemiology), measures such as social distancing, face masks etc. to prevent COVID-19 etc.
- Nonpublic personal information (Gramm–Leach–Bliley Act)
- No pun intended
- Nottingham Prognostic Index
- NP-intermediate, a complexity class in computational complexity theory
- Numbering plan indicator

== See also ==
- NPI-1
- No pun intended
