= Bacterial filtration efficiency =

Bacterial Filtration Efficiency or BFE is a measurement of a respirator material's resistance to penetration of bacteria. Results are reported as percent efficiency and correlate with the ability of the fabric to resist bacterial penetration. Higher numbers in this test indicate better barrier efficiency. Wrap fabrics were compared based on grade as well as basis weight.

== Measurement Methodology ==
Kimberly-Clark uses a test procedure where samples were challenged with a biological aerosol of Staphylococcus aureus and the results employ a ratio of the bacterial challenge counts to sample effluent counts, to determine percent bacterial filtration efficiency (%BFE).

Surgical mask standards in China, Europe, and the United States measure BFE by using particles of size 3.0 μm.
