= 1-NP =

1-NP may refer to:

- Naphthylpiperazine
- 1-Nitropropane
