= Nottingham Prognostic Index =

Index for breast cancer surgery

The Nottingham prognostic index (NPI) is used to determine prognosis following surgery for breast cancer. Its value is calculated using three pathological criteria: the size of the tumour; the number of involved lymph nodes; and the grade of the tumour. It is calculated to select patients for adjuvant treatment.

== Calculation ==
The index is calculated using the formula:

NPI = [0.2 x S] + N + G

Where:

- S is the size of the index lesion in centimetres
- N is the node status: 0 nodes = 1, 1-3 nodes = 2, >3 nodes = 3
- G is the grade of tumour: Grade I =1, Grade II =2, Grade III =3

== Interpretation ==
Score	5-year survival
>/=2.0 to </=2.4	93%
>2.4 to </=3.4	85%
>3.4 to </=5.4	70%
>5.4	50%
