= LNP =

LNP may refer to:

== In science ==
- Lecture Notes in Physics, a book series in the field of physics.
- Linear-Nonlinear-Poisson cascade model, a model of neural responses.
- Lipid nanoparticles, a drug delivery system in pharmacology.
- LNP section, a structural steel standard for a family of unequal angle steel sections.

== In sport ==
- Lega Nazionale Professionisti, Italian football league.
- Liga Nacional Profesional, Honduran football league.

== In politics and government ==
- Liberal–National Coalition, Australia
  - Liberal National Party of Queensland
- Liberian National Police
- Local Nature Partnership, environmental coalitions in England

== Others ==
- Local number portability, of telephone numbers
- Lonesome Pine Airport, Virginia, US, IATA code
- LNP (newspaper), Lancaster, Pennsylvania, US
  - LNP Media Group, publisher of the LNP newspaper
