= Blaise Pascal University =

Former French university (1976 to 2016)

Coordinates: 45.76173°N 3.113075°E

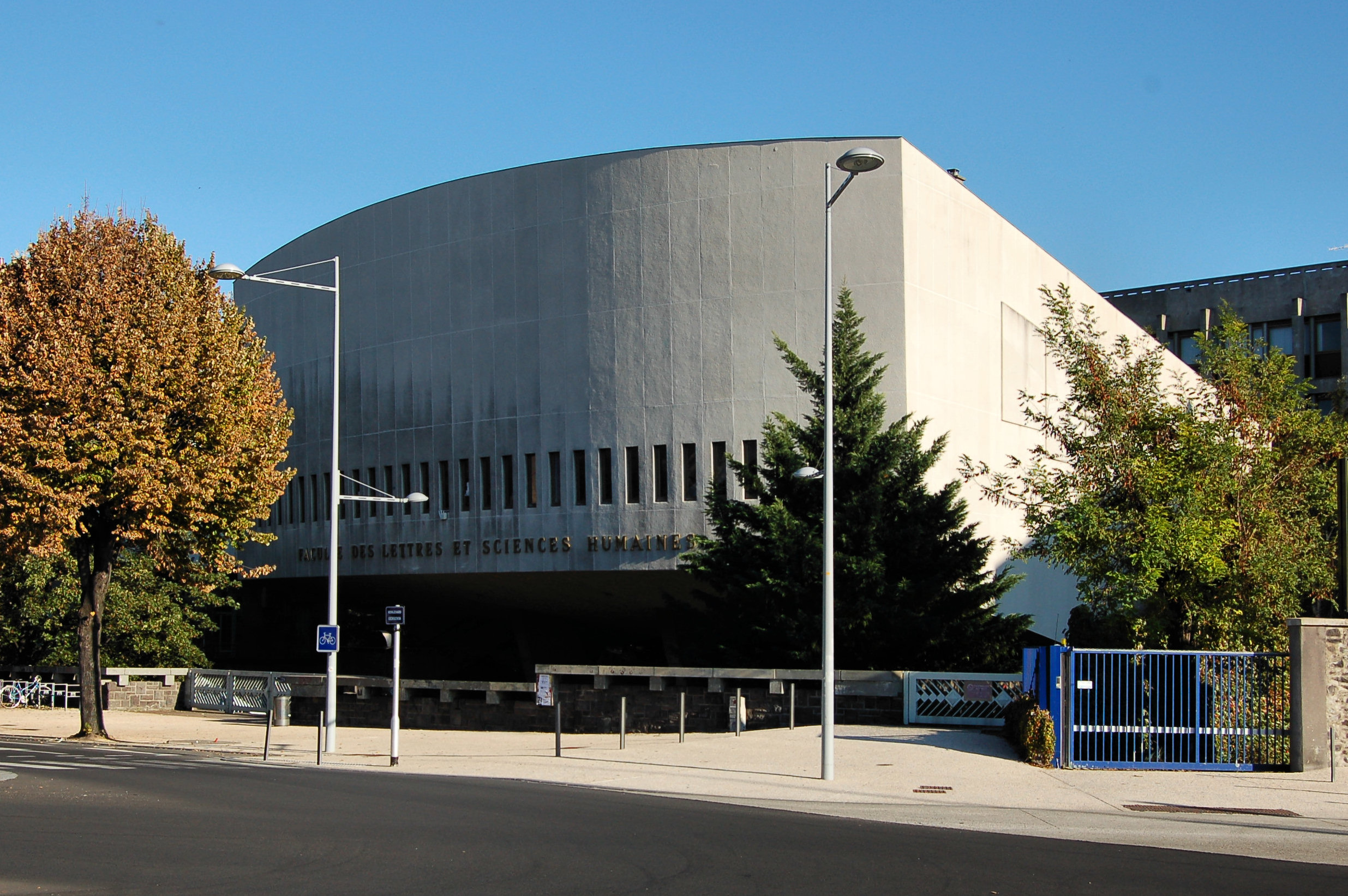
- Blaise Pascal University, Gergovia
- Motto: "An open mind" (L'esprit d'ouverture)
- Type: Public
- Active: 1976–2016
- President: Mathias Bernard
- Academic staff: 1,223
- Administrative staff: 972
- Students: 16,007
- Location: Clermont-Ferrand, France
- Campus: Urban
- Website: www.univ-bpclermont.fr

Blaise Pascal University (French: Université Blaise-Pascal), also known as Université Clermont-Ferrand II, was a public university with its main campus in Clermont-Ferrand, France, with satellite locations in other parts of the region of Auvergne, including Vichy, Moulins, Montluçon, and Aubière. On 1 January 2017, the university merged with the University of Auvergne to form the Clermont Auvergne University.

== History ==
It was founded in 1854, as part of Clermont-Ferrand University.

The Blaise Pascal University was created by the division of the University of Clermont-Ferrand into two entities following a 1976 decree.

In 1987 it was named for mathematician, scientist, and philosopher Blaise Pascal, who was born in Clermont.

Mathias Bernard was elected in 2012 as president of the university.

However, both Clermont-Ferrand universities have announced their intention to merge. As of 2017, Clermont-Ferrand became part of the University Clermont Auvergne.

== Statistics ==
For the 2013–2014 academic year, the university had an enrollment of 16,007 students, of which nearly 2,500 were foreign students. Additionally, it had 970 research professors between its multiple campuses. Students may choose from among 250 degrees and programs.

== Courses ==
It offers bachelor's, master, and doctorate degrees in arts and humanities, engineering, language and cultural studies, and science and technology. It also offers bachelor's or master's degrees in business and social science.

== See also ==
- University of Auvergne or University Clermont I
