= Surgical mask =

Mouth and nose cover against bacterial aerosols

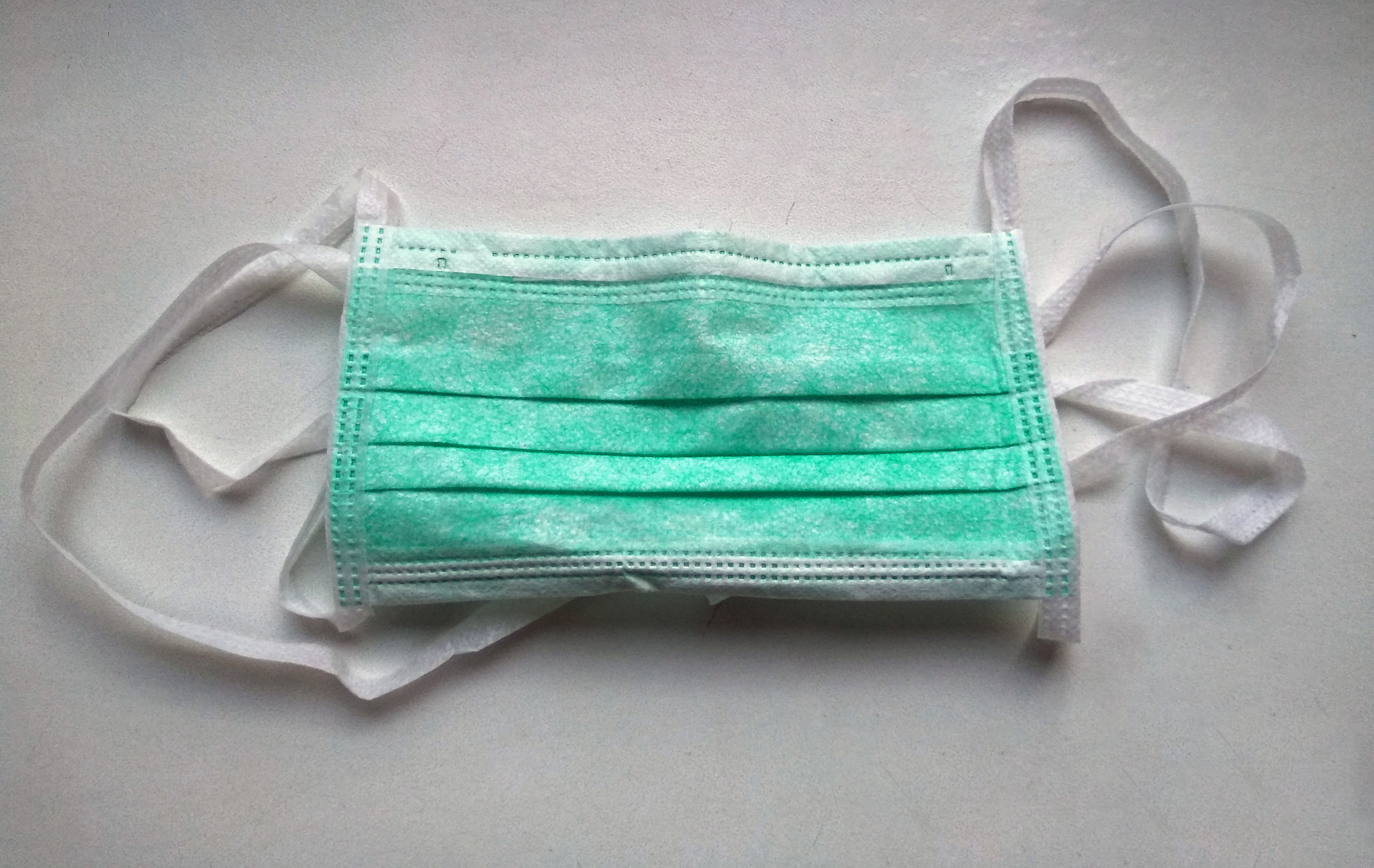
- A surgical mask with hand-tied straps
- Other names: Procedure mask, medical mask, isolation mask, laser mask, fluid-resistant masks, face mask

A surgical mask, also known by other names such as a medical face mask or procedure mask, is a personal protective equipment used by healthcare professionals that serves as a mechanical barrier that interferes with direct airflow in and out of respiratory orifices (i.e. nose and mouth). This helps reduce airborne transmission of pathogens and other aerosolized contaminants between the wearer and nearby people via respiratory droplets ejected when sneezing, coughing, forceful expiration or unintentionally spitting when talking, etc. Surgical masks may be labeled as surgical, isolation, dental or medical procedure masks.

Although the material of which surgical masks are made will filter out some viruses and bacteria by trapping the aerosol suspended in breathed air, they only provide partial protection from airborne diseases because of the typically loose fit between the mask edges and the wearer's face. Surgical masks are distinct from filtering respirators, such as those made to the American N95 standard, which are more airtight and purposefully designed to protect against finer airborne particles.

Comparison of breathing out without (top) and with (bottom) a mask. Note that without a mask jets of air are exhaled that can carry viruses and bacteria rapidly towards a person in front of the person breathing out. But with a mask these jets are blocked, meaning the air instead mostly rises due to convection. Note that although jets are blocked, the same amount of air moves in both cases, allowing the wearer to breathe easily.

Evidence from randomized controlled trials that surgical masks reduce infection from diseases such as influenza is weak. Although a recent very large (over 300,000 people) study found some evidence that they reduced transmission in the community, surgical masks can vary greatly in quality which may make these studies less useful. The effect of surgical masks is partially attributed to filtering out some of aerosol particles that are how airborne diseases are transmitted. Surgical masks are highly variable but the material of which they are made typically filter out more aerosol particles than do cloth masks but much less than does the material of which N95, FFP2 and similar masks, are made. This combined with the poor fit suggests that surgical masks offer some protection to airborne diseases such as COVID-19 but less than do N95, FFP2 and similar masks.

There are standards for the materials masks are made from. For example, the European EN 14683 Type II standard requires the material of the mask to filter particles (mean diameter close to 3 micrometres) containing the bacterium Staphylococcus aureus. The bacterial filtration efficiency of the mask material is the fractional reduction in the number of colony-forming units (CFUs) when the aerosol is passed through the material. For a Type II mask under this standard, the material must filter enough of the aerosol particles containing the bacteria to achieve a CFU reduction of at least 98%.

ASTM International has an F2100 standard with similar bacterial filtering standard to the European Type II standard but in addition uses a test aerosol of 0.1 micrometre particles. The Level 3 standard F2100 standard requires that these particles must be filtered out with at least 98% efficiency. Euro II and F2100 tests measure filter efficiency in a sealed environment - failing to account for air leakage when worn. Personal protection equipment standards such as the FFP test both ideal and worn conditions to account for air leakage.

Surgical masks are made of a nonwoven fabric created using a melt blowing process. They came into use in the 1960s and largely replaced cloth facemasks in developed countries. The colored (usually dark blue, green, or occasionally yellow) side of the mask (fluid-repellant layer) is to be worn outwards, and the white side (absorbent layer) inwards.

In some East Asian countries, masks have often customarily been worn by people who are sick in order to avoid spreading it, to protect against air pollution or allergens, as a fashion statement, or to deter social interaction. The use of surgical masks during the COVID-19 pandemic was a subject of debate, as mask shortage was a central issue.

== Function ==
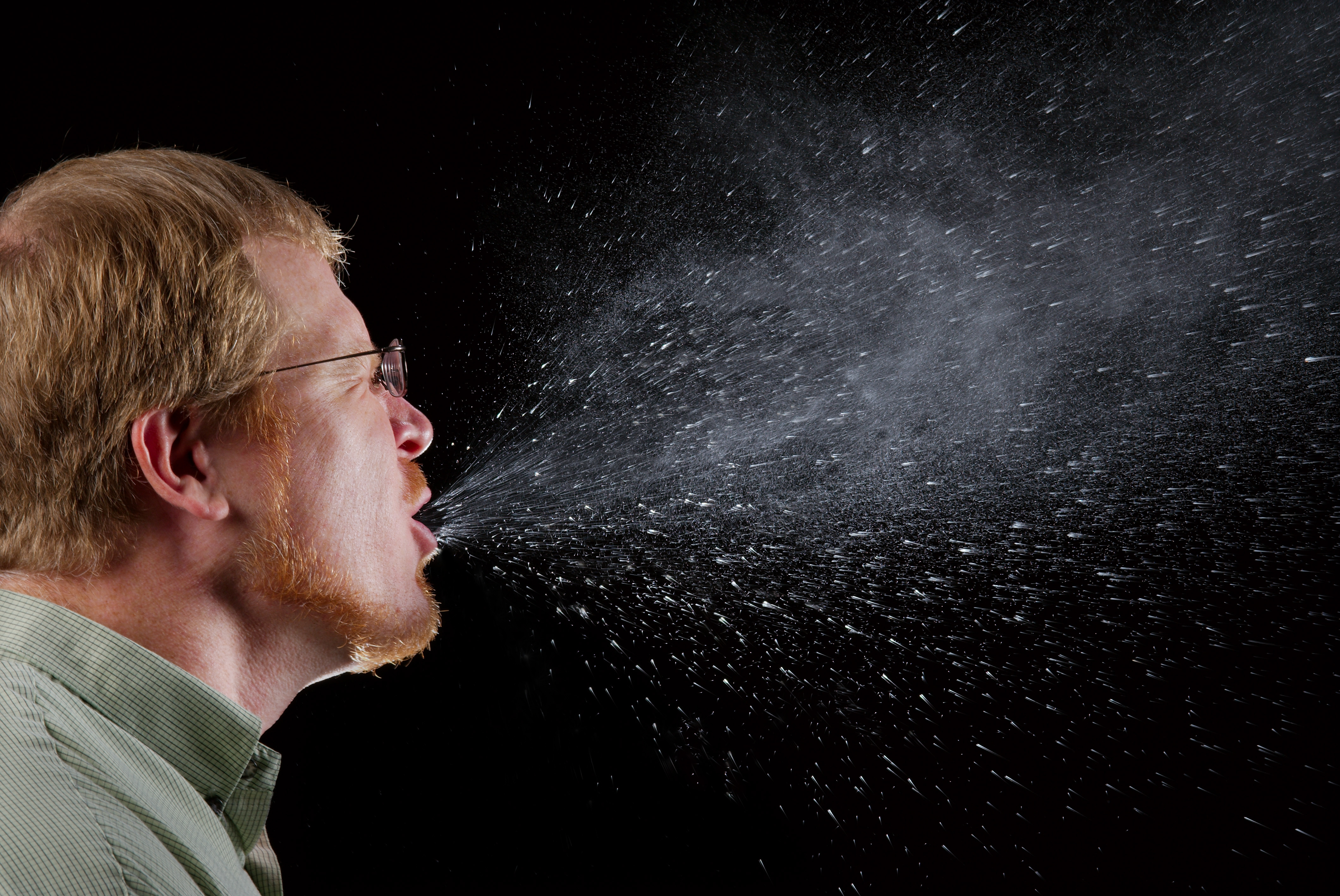
Spraying of respiratory droplets when sneezing. Surgical masks (when used correctly) can retain most of the aerosols released from the wearer, thus reducing airborne spread of pathogens.

Shadowgraph videos of the outer airflow during a sneeze, comparing an unmasked sneeze with several different method of covering one's mouth and nose

A surgical mask serves as a mechanical barrier that interferes with direct airflow in and out of respiratory orifices (i.e. nose and mouth). Most commonly used surgical masks are designed to only trap respiratory droplets, and therefore do not filter or block fine airborne particles that are smaller than the designed filtration ratings, which may be transmitted by coughs, sneezes, unintentional spitting during talking, or certain aerosol-generating medical procedures (e.g. bronchoscopy, laryngoscopy or dental procedures). Surgical masks also cannot provide complete protection from germs and other contaminants because of the often loose fit between the mask edges and the wearer's face, especially when the mask is worn outright incorrectly (e.g. low with the nose and/or mouth exposed).

A surgical mask is a disposable device that creates a physical barrier between the respiratory tract openings (nose and mouth) of the wearer and potentially pathogenic contaminants in the immediate environment. If worn properly, surgical masks are meant to help block out most (if not all) large-particle droplets, splashes, sprays, or splatter that may contain viruses and bacteria, keeping them from entering the wearer's nose and mouth., and conversely are also effective barriers for retaining large droplets released from the wearer's the mouth and nose. Surgical masks help reduce exposure of the wearer's saliva and respiratory secretions to others that could otherwise travel up to 7.9 metres (26 ft). Surgical mask also remind wearers not to touch their mouth or nose, which could otherwise transfer viruses and bacteria after having touched a contaminated surface.

A surgical mask is not to be confused with a respirator (which is specifically rated for sub-micron particles) and is not certified as such. Surgical masks are not designed to protect the wearer from inhaling airborne bacteria or virus particles and are less effective than respirators, which are designed for this purpose. Collection efficiency of surgical mask filters can range from less than 10% to nearly 90% for different manufacturers' masks when measured using the test parameters for NIOSH certification. However, a study found that even for surgical masks with "good" filters, 80–100% of subjects failed an OSHA-accepted qualitative fit test, and a quantitative test showed 12–25% leakage.

Modern surgical masks are made from paper or other non-woven material and should be discarded after each use.

=== Physical form ===
Physical properties of surgical masks
| Parameter | Typical unit |
|---|---|
| Pressure differential, ∆P | cm of H_{2}O / cm^{2} |
| Filtration and exposure | % |
| Liquid penetration resistance | mbar |
| Air permeability | ml/s⋅cm^{2} at 100 Pa |
| Water vapor permeability | g/24 hr⋅cm^{2} |
| Water repellency | grade |

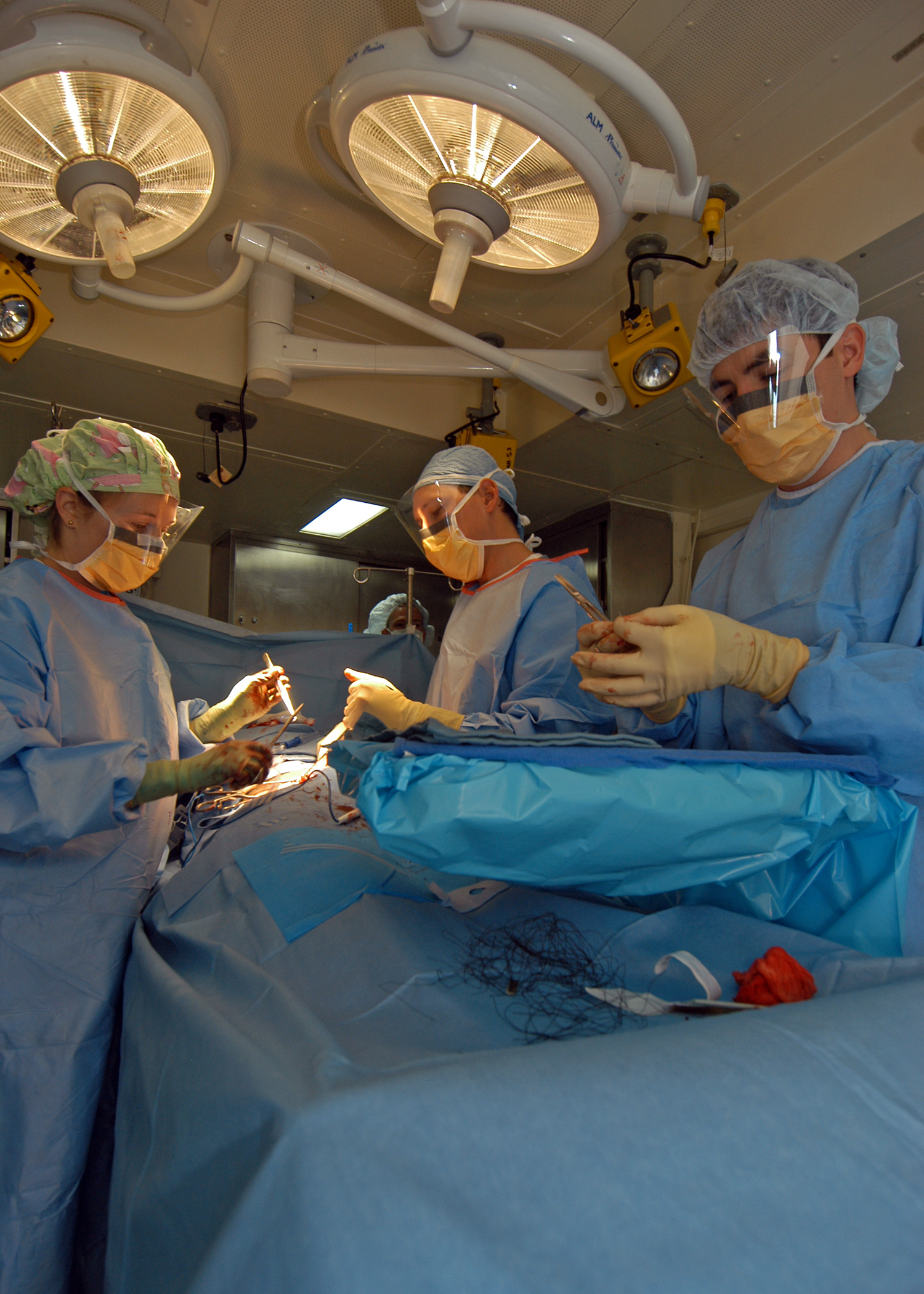
A surgical team of (from left) operating surgeon, assistant and scrub nurse, all wearing masks with integral protective face shields and horizontally hand-tied straps.

The design of the surgical masks depends on the intended usages. Usually, the masks are rectangular shaped with pleats to allow the wearer to expand and curve the mask so it can better cover the entirety of the area from the nose to around the chin. The outward-facing side of the mask is typically colored (usually blue, green, or yellow) and made thicker, tougher, and water impermeable. The inner layers of the mask are made of three-ply (three layers) melt-blown polymer (most commonly polypropylene) placed between non-woven fabric. The melt-blown material acts as the filter that stops microbes from penetrating and exiting the mask. Some masks have an attached thin polyethylene faceshield (known as a "splash shield") to provide additional spray protection over the eye area.

A different type of mask, known as "duckbill" masks, uses a trapezoid pouch-like design that has significantly shortened side edges — sometimes none at all — to minimize loose gaps that pathogens can leak past. These masks are typically made to the N95/P2 standards, and are commonly used for clinical situations that demand fine particulates protection, such as tuberculosis.

Small strips of foam or thickened fabric are often sewn along the top edge of the mask to help better seal away exhaled water vapors (which can fog up eyewears and faceshields) and soak up excess perspiration dripping from above. Small bendable metal strips are frequently added to the top edge to better fit over the nasal bridge. Occasionally adhesive tapes can also be added to secure the seal and prevent the mask from slipping up and down.

The masks are typically fastened to the head with straps or elastic bands that are attached to the mask's four corners. Straps come in four free-hanging ribbons that are manually tied in two pairs horizontally around the back of the head, and are most frequently used in surgical operations due to the ability to customize the strap length and tension comfortably to the wearer's face shape and head movements. Elastic bands come in a pair of loops that can either be horizontally or vertically attached. Horizontal loops go around the head like tied straps, designed to exert tension on the top and bottom edges of the mask for firmer contact seal, and are usually seen on duckbill masks; while vertical loops hook around the ears with less tension (due to the weaker rigidity of the elastocartilaginous auricles compared to the bony skull) and thus less firmly secured to the face, but are more popular in non-procedural usages due to the ease of putting on and taking off.

Filter material in the middle layer may be made of microfibers with an electrostatic charge; that is, the fibers are electrets. An electret filter increases the chances that smaller particles will veer and hit a fiber, rather than going straight through (electrostatic capture). While there is some development work on making electret filtering materials that can stand being washed and reused, current commercially produced electret filters are ruined by many forms of disinfection, including washing with soap and water or alcohol, which destroys the electric charge. During the COVID-19 pandemic, public health authorities issued guidelines on how to save, disinfect and reuse electret-filter masks without damaging the filtration efficiency. Standard disposible surgical masks are not designed to be washed.

=== Physical properties and quality ===
Performance of surgical masks is evaluated based on such parameters as filtration (mask capture of exhaled aerosols), exposure (transfer of aerosols from outside), mask airflow resistance (pressure difference during breathing, ΔP, also known as breathability), liquid penetration resistance, air and water vapor permeability, water repellency (for outer and inner surfaces).

Filtration and exposure is typically measured in bacterial filtration efficiency (BFE) using particles of size 3.0 μm. Particulate filtration efficiency (PFE) using particles of size 0.3 μm is only measured in China.

== History ==
Face masks for use in surgery were developed in Europe by several physicians, including Jan Mikulicz-Radecki at the University of Breslau and Paul Berger in Paris, in the late nineteenth century, as a result of increasing awareness of germ theory and the importance of antiseptic procedures in medicine. In response to a pneumonic plague in Manchuria and Mongolia in 1910, Chinese-Malaysian epidemiologist Dr. Wu Lien-teh greatly improved on the designs he had seen in Europe to develop a face mask of layers of gauze and cotton that would protect both the wearer and others.

Modern surgical masks began to be used in the 1960s. Their adoption caused cloth facemasks, which had been used since the late 19th century, to completely fall out of use in the developed world. However, cloth masks and surgical masks both continued to be used in developing countries.

=== COVID-19 pandemic ===
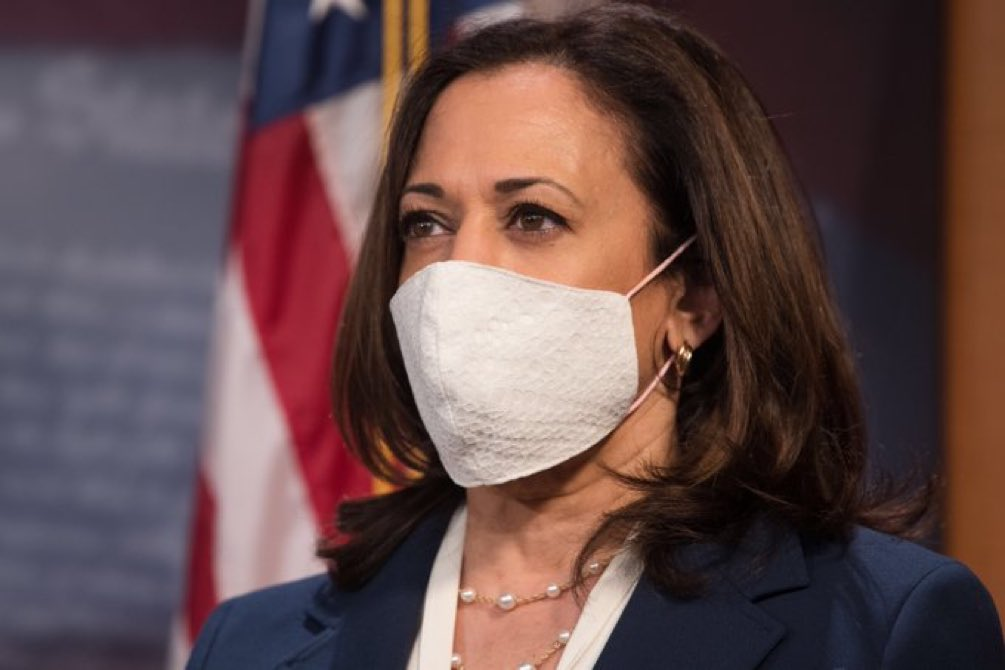
Then-senator Kamala Harris wearing a face mask during the COVID-19 pandemic in October 2020

During the COVID-19 pandemic, face masks or coverings, including N95, FFP2, surgical, and cloth masks, were used as public and personal health control measures against the spread of SARS-CoV-2, the virus that causes COVID-19.

In community and healthcare settings, the use of face masks was intended as source control to limit transmission of the virus and for personal protection to prevent infection. When properly worn, face masks can limit the respiratory droplets and aerosols that are spread by infected individuals, helping protect healthy individuals from infection.

Scientific studies concluded that the use of face masks was effective in protecting the individual using them against COVID-19. Various case-control and population-based studies also showed that the increased use of masks in a community reduced the spread of SARS-CoV-2, although there was a scarcity of evidence from randomized controlled trials (RCTs). Masks varied in their effectiveness. Fitted N95s outperform surgical masks, while cloth masks provided marginal protection. During the public health emergency, governments widely recommended (and, in some jurisdictions, mandated) the wearing of masks. Prominent national and intergovernmental health agencies and their leaders recommended the use of masks to reduce transmission, including the WHO, American, European, and Chinese Centers for Disease Control and Prevention.

As the pandemic raged on, healthcare workers were required to continue wearing surgical masks for 12 or more hours a day. This caused the ear loops of the masks to chafe the back of their ears. Ear savers, plastic straps and hooks that go around wearer's heads, were invented to move the ear loops away from the wearer's ears. They could be made on demand by using 3D printing process.

== Use ==
=== Healthcare workers ===
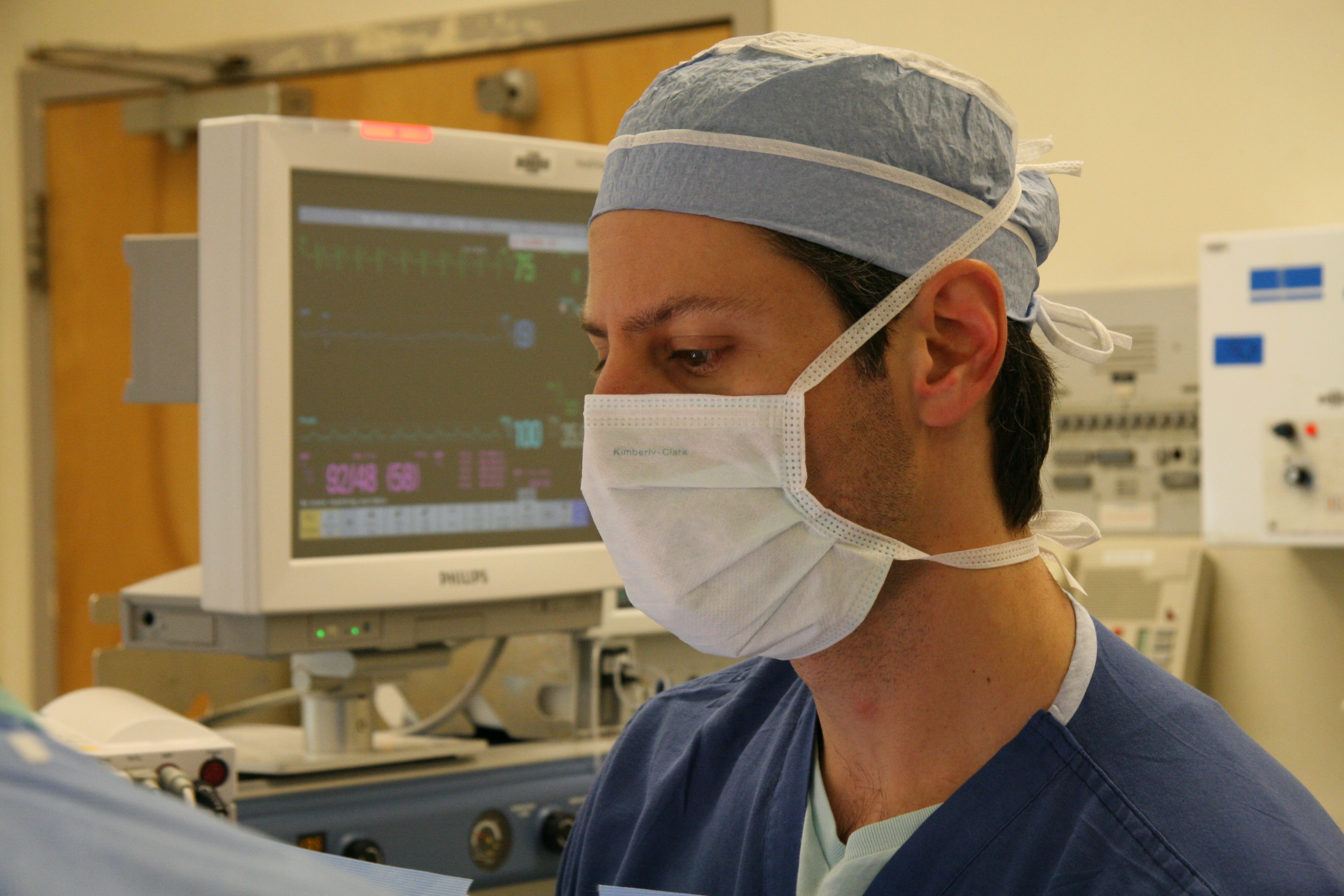
A medical professional (anesthesiologist) wearing a surgical mask during an operation

A surgical mask is intended to be worn by health professionals during surgery and certain health care procedures to catch microorganisms shed in liquid droplets and aerosols from the wearer's mouth and nose. Evidence supports the effectiveness of surgical masks in reducing the risk of infection among other healthcare workers and in the community. However, a Cochrane review found that there is no clear evidence that disposable face masks worn by members of the surgical team would reduce the risk of wound infections after clean surgical procedures. However, the review cautioned that the studies examined are of low quality and that the result should not be generalized.

Healthcare workers are trained in how to put on, handle, remove, and dispose of surgical masks. For healthcare workers, safety guidelines recommend the wearing of a face-fit tested N95 or FFP3 respirator mask instead of a surgical mask in the vicinity of pandemic-flu patients, to reduce the exposure of the wearer to potentially infectious aerosols and airborne liquid droplets.

=== General public ===
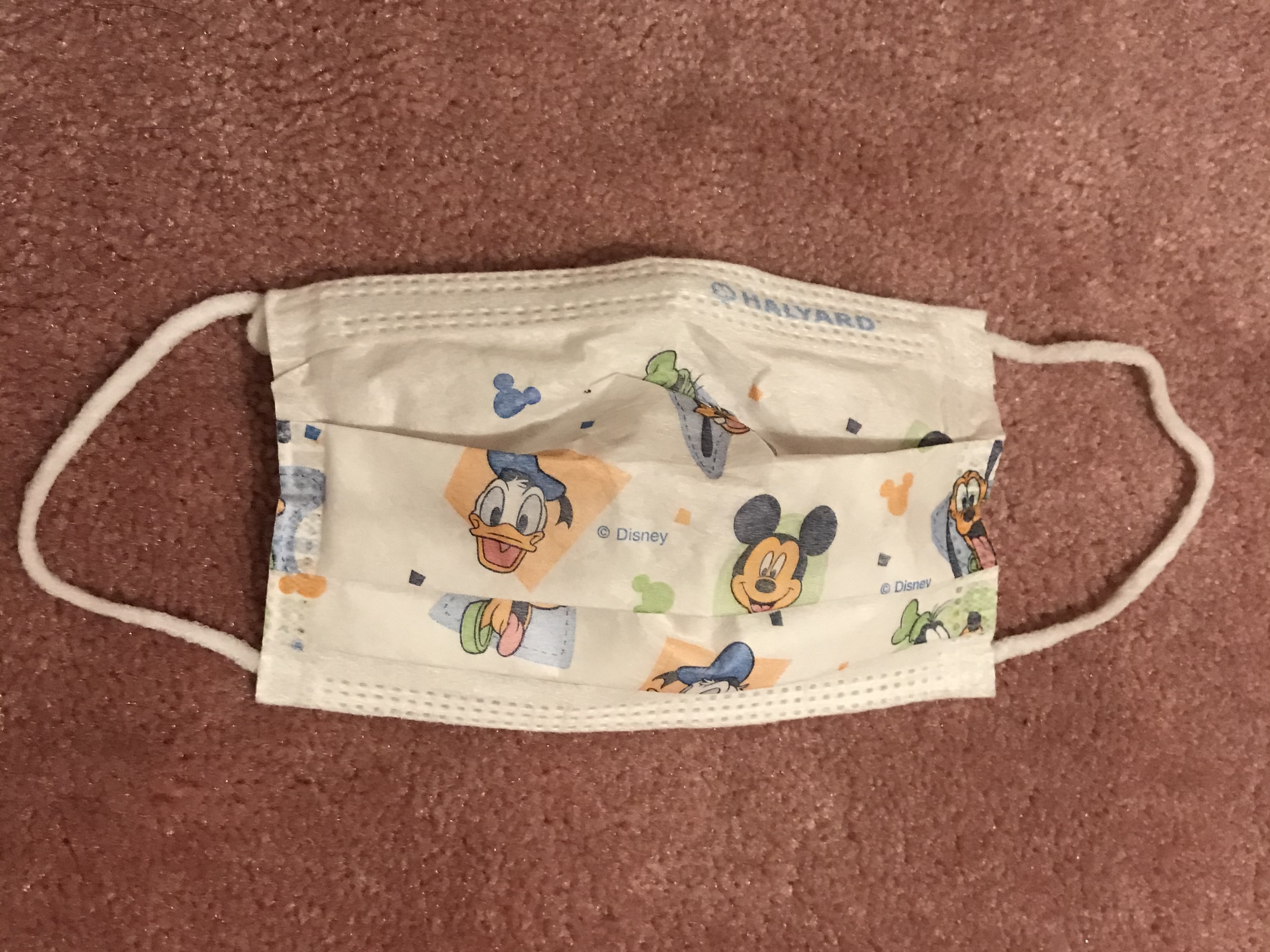
A face mask with Disney characters, designed for children

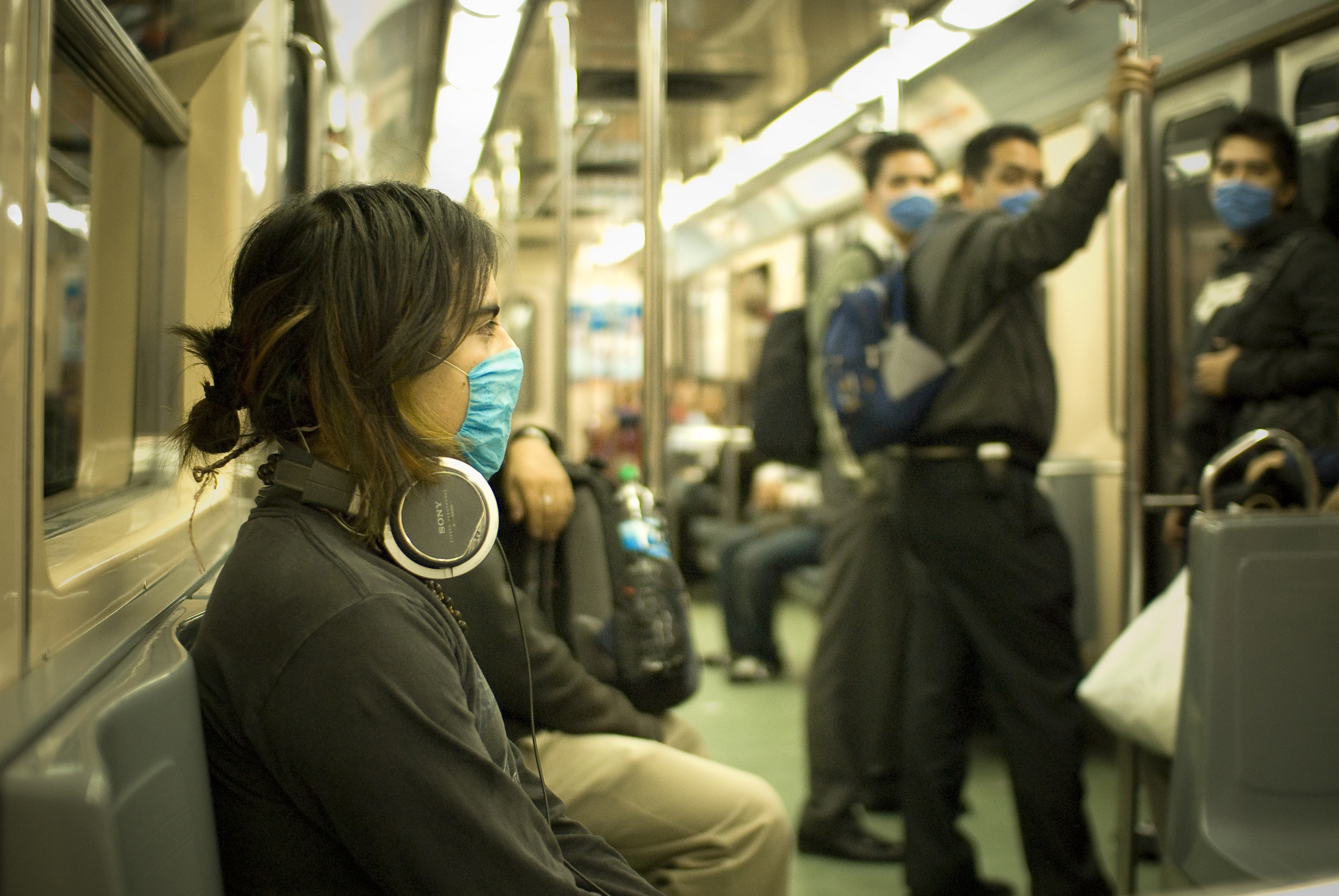
Passengers on public transport in Mexico City wearing face masks during the 2009 swine flu pandemic

In community and home settings, the use of facemasks and respirators is generally not recommended, with other measures such as avoiding close contact, maintaining good hand hygiene, and wearing cloth face coverings being preferred instead. Surgical masks provide some protection against the spread of diseases, and improvised masks provide about half as much protection.

The custom of wearing surgical masks in public began in Japan in the early 20th century during the Spanish flu pandemic, which killed 20 to 40 million people worldwide. A second global influenza pandemic in 1934 established the use of surgical masks in Japan. Later, this custom spread to other parts of East Asia.

In Japan and Taiwan, surgical masks have commonly been worn in winter months during the flu season by those who have respiratory illnesses as a courtesy intended to prevent viral transmission. People in Japan, as well as Korea and China, may also wear masks in any season to guard against air pollution or allergies. Some younger Japanese people wear masks and audio headsets to signal a desire to avoid interaction. Hay fever has been common in Japan since the 1980s, and as of 2019, 42.5% of the Japanese population suffers from some form of hay fever, with 38.8% suffering from cedar pollinosis, making the use of surgical masks more common in winter and spring. On the other hand, acupuncturist Michelle M. Ching says that mask-wearing as a custom appeared in East Asia rather than other parts of the world also facing pollution and disease due to the historical influence of Traditional Chinese Medicine and its ideas about air and wind.

More recently, due to the rising issue of smog in South and Southeast Asia, surgical masks and air filtering face masks are now frequently used in major cities in India, Nepal and Thailand when air quality deteriorates to toxic levels. Additionally, face masks are used in Indonesia, Malaysia and Singapore during the Southeast Asian haze season. Air filtering surgical-style masks are quite popular across Asia and as a result, many companies have released masks with fashionable designs. In Japan, some use masks as fashion statements, at times as a result of influence from lolita fashion, black metal and K-pop stars.

Surgical masks may also be worn to conceal identity. In the United States banks, convenience stores and other businesses have banned them from being worn as a result of criminals using them for that purpose, but became more lenient due to the COVID-19 pandemic. In the 2019–20 Hong Kong protests, some protestors wore surgical masks amongst other types of mask to avoid facial recognition, and the government banned such use.

Research carried out during the COVID-19 pandemic found that surgical masks increase the attractiveness of the wearer and this effect is greater than with other types of face coverings.

== Research and development ==
Researchers are developing face-masks which may help reduce viral spread better than existing ones and/or have possibly useful properties such as biodegradability or better breathability. Some are exploring whether attachments could be added to existing face-masks to make them more effective such as due to virus-deactivating fabrics or impregnations. The COVID-19 pandemic increased efforts to develop such masks.

There also is an experimental face mask with an embedded biosensor that can detect a pathogenic signature (such as one of SARS-CoV-2) and face masks that glow under ultraviolet light if they contain SARS-CoV-2 when the filter is taken out and sprayed with a fluorescent dye that contains antibodies from ostrich eggs.

Other research investigated environmental pollution associated with face mask waste management and weak spots of masks with product designs of the widely applied FFP standards, in particular variants with exhalation valves.

== Regulation ==
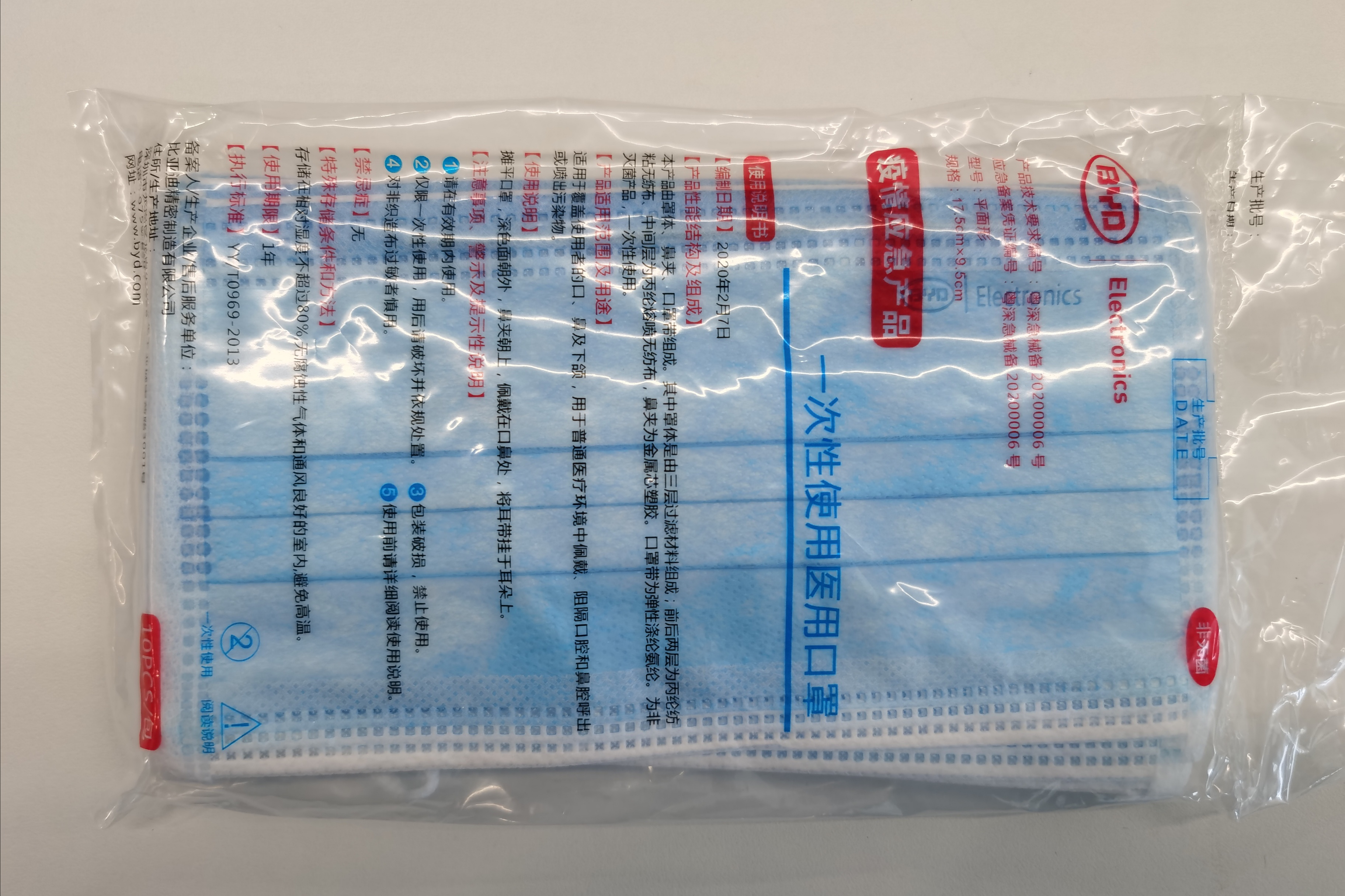
Single-use medical masks

In the United States, surgical masks are cleared for marketing by the U.S. Food and Drug Administration. In the European Economic Area (EEA), surgical masks have to be certified through the CE marking process in order to be commercialized. CE marking of surgical masks involves the respect of many obligations indicated in the Medical Device Regulation (Council Regulation 2017/745 of 5 April 2017 concerning medical devices, OJ No L 117/1 of 2017-05-05).

Surgical masks for use in the US and the EEA conform to ASTM F2100 and EN 14683 respectively. In both standards, a mask must have a Bacterial Filtration Efficiency (BFE) of more than 95%, for an aerosol of particles of size approximately 3.0 μm.

In China, two types of masks are common: surgical masks that conform to YY 0469 standard (BFE ≥ 95%, PFE ≥ 30%, splash resistance) and single-use medical masks that conform to YY/T 0969 standard (BFE ≥ 95%). Daily protective masks conforming to GB/T 32610 standard is yet another type of masks that can have similar appearance to surgical masks.

== Sensorized Surgical Masks ==
In 2014, Firat Güder while he was a research fellow at Harvard University, together with Professor George Whitesides, invented a wireless surgical face mask that can monitor breathing of the individual wearing the mask. Their technology relied on disposal paper-based printed sensors which could be integrated into the mask. The technology, which was first published in 2016, led to the formation of a start-up (Spyras Ltd) company to commercialize it which was later acquired.

== See also ==
- N95 respirator, another mask often worn by healthcare professionals – Particulate respirator meeting the N95 standard
- Dust mask
- Nose filter
- Sterilization (microbiology)
