= Clermont Auvergne University =

French university

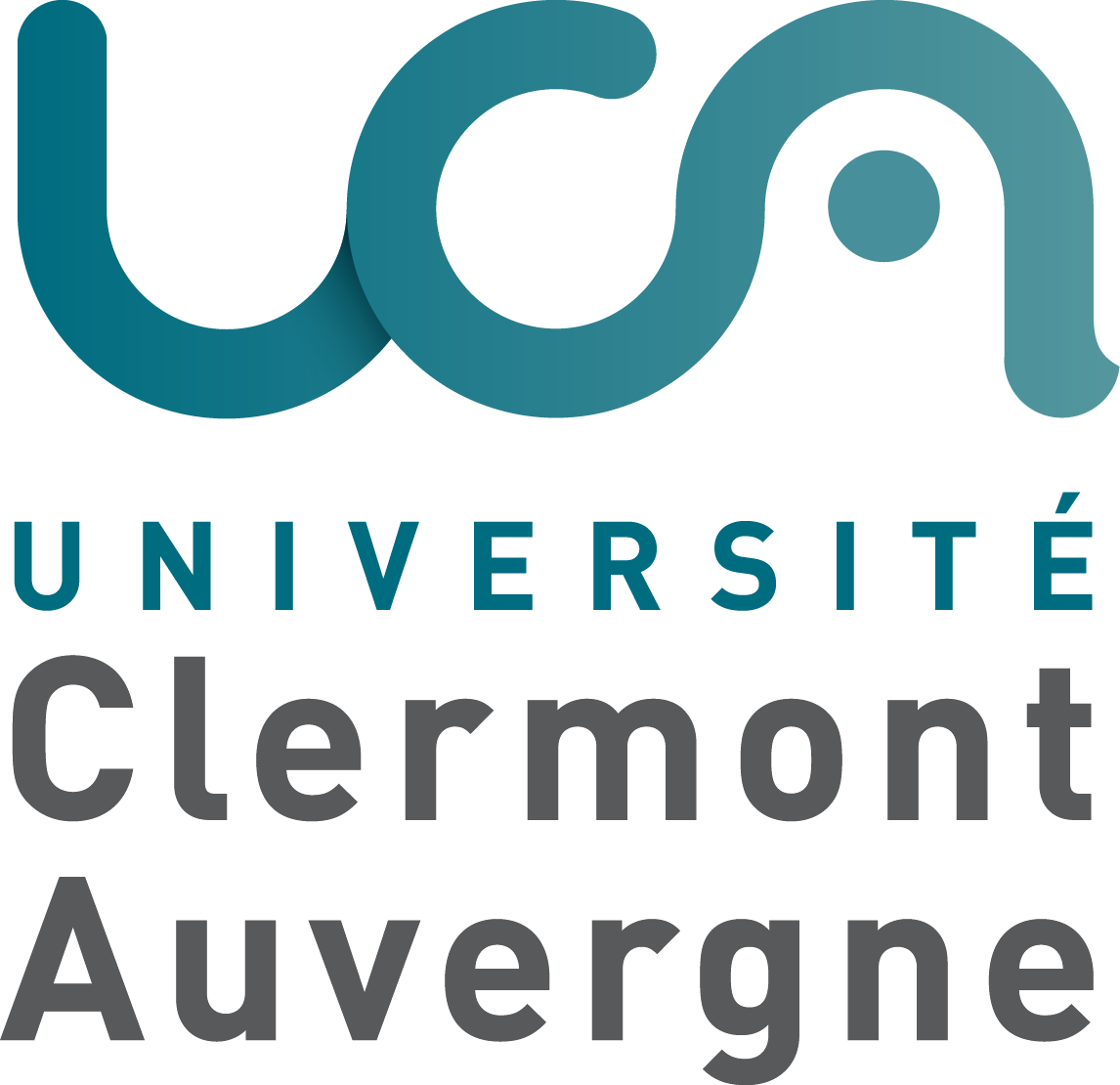
- Type: Public
- Established: 2017
- President: Mathias Bernard
- Faculty: 1281
- Administrative staff: 1937
- Students: 39,000
- Location: Clermont-Ferrand, Auvergne-Rhône-Alpes, France; 45°45′42″N 3°06′47″E
- Website: http://www.uca.fr/
- Location in Auvergne-Rhône-Alpes

Clermont Auvergne University (French: Université Clermont Auvergne, or UCA) is a public research university with its main campus in Clermont-Ferrand, France. It was created with the merger of Blaise Pascal University and the University of Auvergne on 1 January 2017.

Clermont Auvergne University comprises 22 components, divided into Training and Research Units (UFR, formerly faculties), Schools and Institutes (IUT).

== History ==
There had been only one university in Clermont-Ferrand since the 19th century. In 1976, due to political disagreements following the 1969 loi Faure, the university was split in two, Clermont I University (later renamed University of Auvergne) and Clermont II University (Blaise Pascal University) 16 March 1976.

Discussions about the possibility of merging the two universities were started in 2012, and the merging was officially announced on 23 September 2013 by the two university presidents.

The name of the new university was publicly announced in January 2015. The merging was officialized by a government decree on 13 September 2016, and effective as of January 1, 2017.

On January 1, 2021, Clermont-Auvergne University status changed and it became an experimental public establishment (EPE) and integrated the National Polytechnic Clermont Auvergne Institute (itself a merger of the SIGMA Clermont Engineering School and the training activities and research of the schools Polytech Clermont-Ferrand and Institut d'informatique d'Auvergne).

== Locations ==
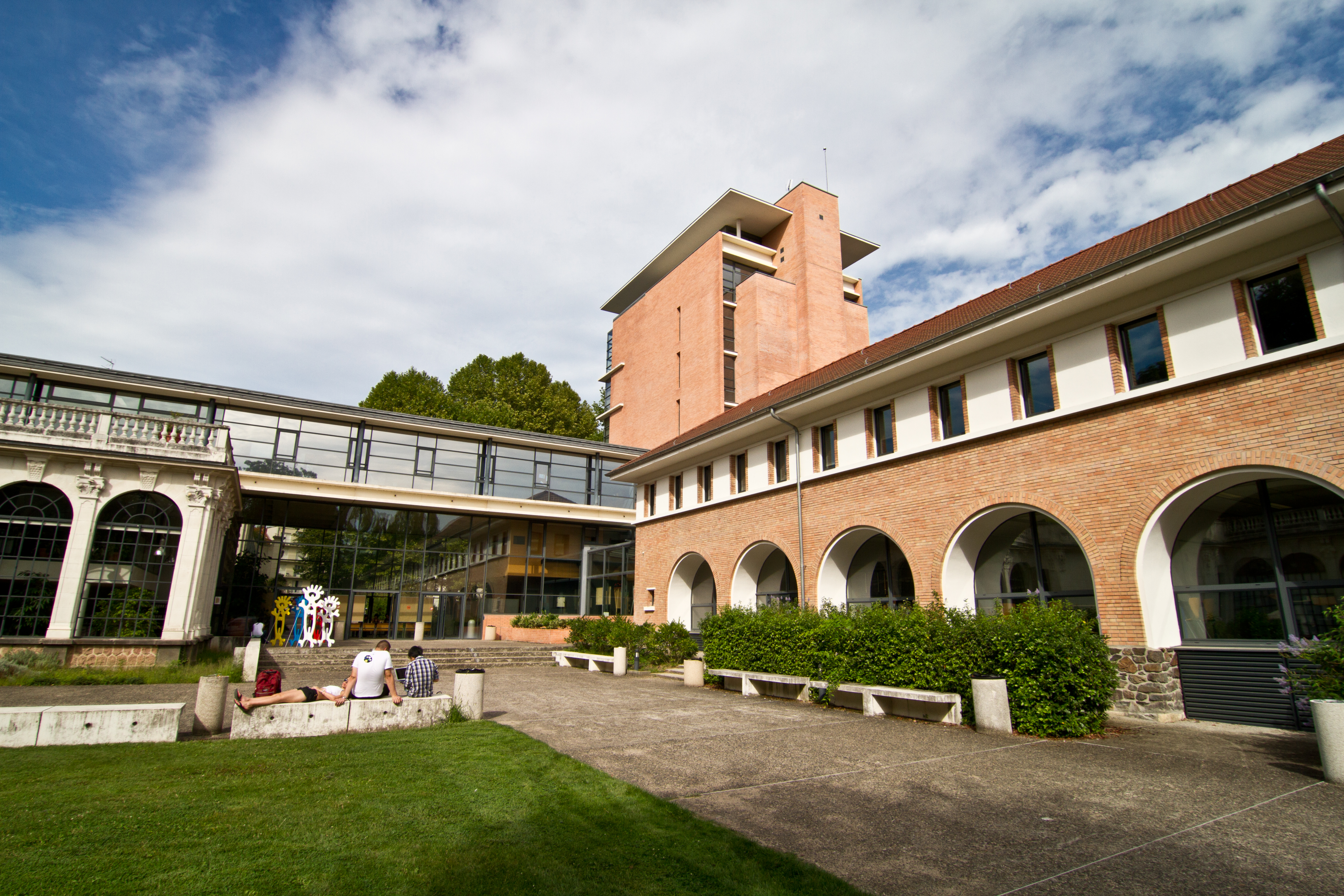
Vichy campus.

The university has several campuses in Clermont-Ferrand and throughout the Auvergne region.

Near the city center of Clermont, there is the Carnot site to the east and the Gergovia site to the south. The Cézeaux campus is located further south in the neighboring town of Aubière.

The Clermont Auvergne University Institute of Technology is also present in Aurillac, Clermont-Ferrand, Montluçon, Moulins, Le Puy and Vichy.

The institute that trains teachers for the national public education is present in Chamalières, Moulins, Le Puy and Aurillac.

== Notable faculty ==
- Anne Zink - historian

== Notable alumni ==
- Paul Aulagnier (1943-2021) - Traditionalist Catholic priest
- Fabienne Mackay - French Australian research immunologist
