= Paul Collomp =

French scholar (1885–1943)

- Born: 15 December 1885; Niort
- Died: 25 November 1943 (aged 57); Clermont-Ferrand
- Occupations: Hellenist; Papyrologist

Paul Collomp (15 December 1885 – 25 November 1943) was a French scholar who specialized in the history of the Ptolemaic Kingdom. He was shot by the Gestapo during a raid on the University of Strasbourg, which at the time had been evacuated to Clermont-Ferrand.

== Works ==
- 1926: Recherches sur la chancellerie et la diplomatique des Lagides, (thesis).
- 1927: La papyrologie, introduction à cette discipline.
- 1928: Michel Andrieu et Paul Collomp, Fragments sur papyrus de l'anaphore de Saint Marc, in Revue des sciences religieuses, (p. 500–501).
- 1931: La critique des textes, Paris, Belles lettres, 128 p.

== Bibliography ==
- Gustave Dupont-Ferrier, Nécrologie, Comptes rendus de l'Académie des inscriptions et belles-lettres, 87, 1943, (p. 589–590).
