= PNI =

PNI may refer to:

== Organizations ==
- Indonesian National Party (Partai Nasional Indonesia), the name used by several political parties in Indonesia
- Palestinian National Initiative, a Palestinian political party
- PNI Atlantic News, a Canadian newspaper publisher (formerly SaltWire Network)
- PNI Digital Media (Photochannel Networks Inc), a US company that operates an on-demand photographic printing service
- United Nations Crime Prevention and Criminal Justice Programme Network, a global research- and information-sharing network

== Science ==
- Perineural invasion, cancer spreading along a nerve
- Psychoneuroimmunology, the study of interaction between the nervous system and immune system

== Technology ==
- Prescott New Instructions, also known as SSE3, an instruction set introduced with the Intel Prescott processor in 2004
- Private Network Interconnect, a method of Internet peering

== Other uses ==
- PNI, IATA Airport Code for Pohnpei International Airport in Micronesia
