= National Polytechnic Institutes (France) =

French engineering universities (1969-)

The National Polytechnic Institutes (Instituts Nationaux Polytechniques or INPs) in France are five consortiums of grandes écoles that offer engineering degrees.

== Description ==
The consortiums were established in 1969. They are classed with French universities by Article 24 of the Law regarding the Organization of Higher Education in France (law 84-52 of 26 January 1984, the loi Savary). However, the institutions are quite different from the public universities, both in their organization and in the fact that they have competitive admissions.

The group educates 1 in every 6 engineers in the country.

== Group ==
The institutions in the National Polytechnic Institutes are:

- The Grenoble Institute of Technology (Institut National Polytechnique de Grenoble or INP Grenoble)
- The National Polytechnic Institute of Lorraine (Institut National Polytechnique de Lorraine or Lorraine INP)
- The Polytechnic Institute of Bordeaux (Institut Polytechnique de Bordeaux or Bordeaux INP)
- The Polytechnic Institute of Clermont-Auvergne (Institut national polytechnique Clermont-Auvergne or Clermont Auvergne INP)

Clermont Auvergne INP is a consortium consisting of three graduate schools: ISIMA, Polytech Clermont, and SIGMA Clermont. In January 2021, they joined the group as Clermont Auvergne INP. In July 2022, the National Polytechnic Institute of Toulouse (Toulouse INP) left the group. The same month, the National School of Engineering in Brest (ENIB) expressed its desire to work more closely with the group.

== CCINP entrance exams ==
The Concours Commun des Instituts Nationaux Polytechniques (CCINP) are entrance exams for scores of engineering schools in France. The exams were originally created by and for the INP but are now used as entrance exams for numerous schools in the country.
