= Jean Frydman =

French politician and businessman (1925–2021)

Jean Frydman (26 June 1925 – 14 March 2021) was a French-Israeli businessman, film and television producer, and a decorated member of the French Resistance during the Second World War. He received the Légion d'honneur for his wartime efforts.

He was a media pioneer and played a key early role in launching private radio and television in France. He co-founded Europe 1 and serving as an executive at Télé Monte-Carlo. Later, he became central to a major scandal involving L'Oréal, where he exposed the wartime collaborationist pasts of senior executives while pursuing legal action over an alleged Arab boycott-related dismissal.

== Early Life and Resistance ==
He was born on 26 June 1925 in Warsaw, Poland, to a Jewish family. Frydman moved to Paris as a child, where his parents operated a small factory. He grew up in France and became deeply engaged in the anti-Nazi activities at a young age. During World War II, at the age of 15, he joined French Resistance and Free France army. He crossed into Spain to link up with them. He operated in southern France with the Franc-Tireur movement, and participated in sabotage operations against trains, industrial plants, and power infrastructure. In 1942, upon learning of impending round-ups of Jews in Paris, he returned to the Paris to warn his family which enabled them to evade the Vel' d'Hiv roundup.

In the summer of 1944, he was captured by Gestapo and was imprisoned at Fresnes. He was then sentenced to death. Due to his Jewish identity, he was not immediately executed but was deported in one of the final convoys from Paris to Buchenwald (where he was registered as prisoner number 79). En route to the camp, he and two companions sawed through the floorboards and escaped. One of the deportees in the same train car was Marcel Dassault.

== Post-WWII and Media ==
After the Second World War, he co-founded Europe 1, one of France's first independent radio station, and established its advertising régie (sales division) in 1956; he served till 1962. In 1967, he became managing director (administrateur-délégué) of Télé Monte-Carlo. He later founded and presided over Médiavision, a major cinema and media advertising agency. He has been described as "the secret gardener of the French audiovisual sector".

He was also a producer of multiple television series and films, including the long-running TV series Les dossiers de l'écran (starting 1967) and the 2006 feature film O Jerusalem.

From 1981 onward, Frydman lived primarily in Israel (dual French-Israeli citizen).

== L'Oréal ==
In 1988, Frydman and his brother, formed an audiovisual joint venture with L'Oréal, Paravision International. In 1989, L'Oréal acquired Helena Rubinstein, a brand with Israeli operations, which placed the company on the Arab League boycott list. In order to resolve the blacklist, with French government backing, Frydman was allegedly pressured by L'Oréal to resign from Paravision board due his Jewish heritage and Israeli citizenship. When he refused, the company purportedly forged his resignation letter and forced him out.

After having been forced to leave the Board of Paravision, he filed lawsuits in both France and United States for forgery, use of forgery, racial discrimination, and illegal compliance with the Arab boycott. He claimed L'Oréal owed him approximately $31 million for his stake. The dispute involved into protracted legal battles in France and the United States. L'Oréal eventually settled U.S. charges of boycott violations for $1.4 million but denied the core allegations and asserted that Frydman had resigned voluntarily.

The affair gained public notarity when Frydman uncovered and publicized the wartime collaboration records of L'Oréal leadership. It was revealed that Jacques Corrèze, CEO of L'Oréal's U.S. operations, had been a leader in the far-right terrorist group La Cagoule. Corrèze collaborated with Nazis during the occupation, including service on the Eastern Front with SS units, received a death sentence post-war but was released. Corrèze resigned in 1991 and expressed regret for "acts that I may have committed 40 years ago".

Frydman also released over 60 virulently anti-Semitic articles written by André Bettencourt (L'Oréal deputy chairman and husband of heiress Liliane Bettencourt) for the Nazi-financed propaganda sheet La Terre Française during the occupation. Bettencourt dismissed the writings as "errors of youth" before stepping down. L'Oréal's founder Eugène Schueller also had ties to La Cagoule and collaborationist publications. These revelations implicated L'Oréal's leadership and also intersected with ongoing controversies around President François Mitterrand. Mitterrand reportedly urged Frydman to drop the lawsuit for France's image. All the lawsuits and complaints were settled out of court.

== Later life and Activism ==
Frydman served as a member of the advisory board of the Israel Council on Foreign Relations and was instrumental in starting the Oslo Peace Accords. He was involved in negotiations between Israel and Palestine, as he advised Shimon Peres, Yitzhak Rabin, and Ehud Barak. In 1995, he helped organize a major peace rally in Tel Aviv backing the Oslo Accords. It was at this event, Prime Minister Yitzhak Rabin was assassinated.

In 2016, President François Hollande awarded him the Légion d'honneur for his patroitism and wartime service.

== Personal life ==
Jean Frydman had six children, ten grandchildren, and was married to his third wife, Daniela Frydman at the time of his death. He was a friend of former French President Valéry Giscard d'Estaing, former Israeli President Shimon Peres, former Israeli Prime Minister Ehud Barak, and former IMF Managing Director Dominique Strauss-Kahn.

Jean Frydman died in Savyon, Israel, on 14 March 2021, at the age of 95. His passing was announced by Michael Bar-Zohar and confirmed by a family spokesperson in France. A biography, Jean Frydman, tableaux d'une vie, was written by former Israeli ambassador Elie Barnavi.

== See also ==
- L'Oréal
