= Helena Rubinstein =

Polish and American businesswoman, art collector, and philanthropist

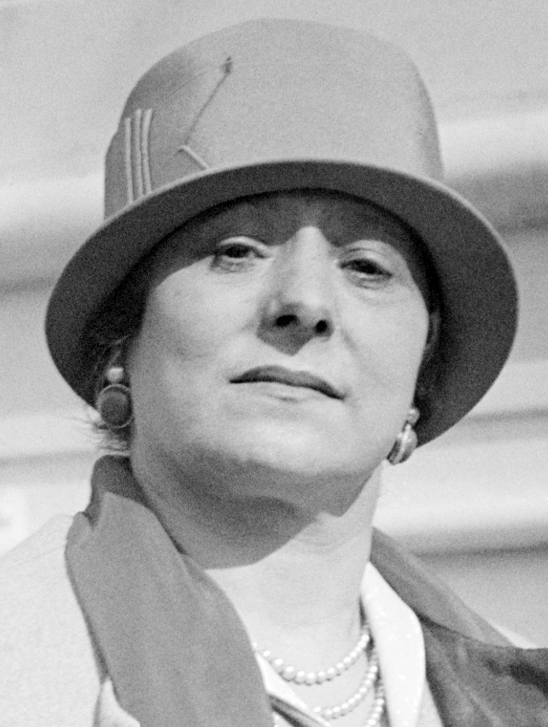
- Born: Chaja Rubinstein; December 25, 1872; Kraków, Grand Duchy of Kraków, Austria-Hungary
- Died: April 1, 1965 (aged 92); New York City, US
- Other names: Princess Gourielli, Madame Helena Rubinstein, Chaja Rubinstein
- Occupations: Businesswoman; philanthropist; art collector; cosmetician
- Known for: Founder and eponym of Helena Rubinstein Incorporated cosmetics company
- Spouses: Edward William Titus (m. 1908; div. 1938) Prince Artchil Gourielli-Tchkonia (m. 1938; died 1955)

Helena Rubinstein (born Chaja Rubinstein; December 25, 1872 – April 1, 1965) was a Polish-born businesswoman, art collector, and philanthropist. She founded Helena Rubinstein Incorporated cosmetics company, which ultimately made her one of the world's wealthiest women.

== Early life and education ==
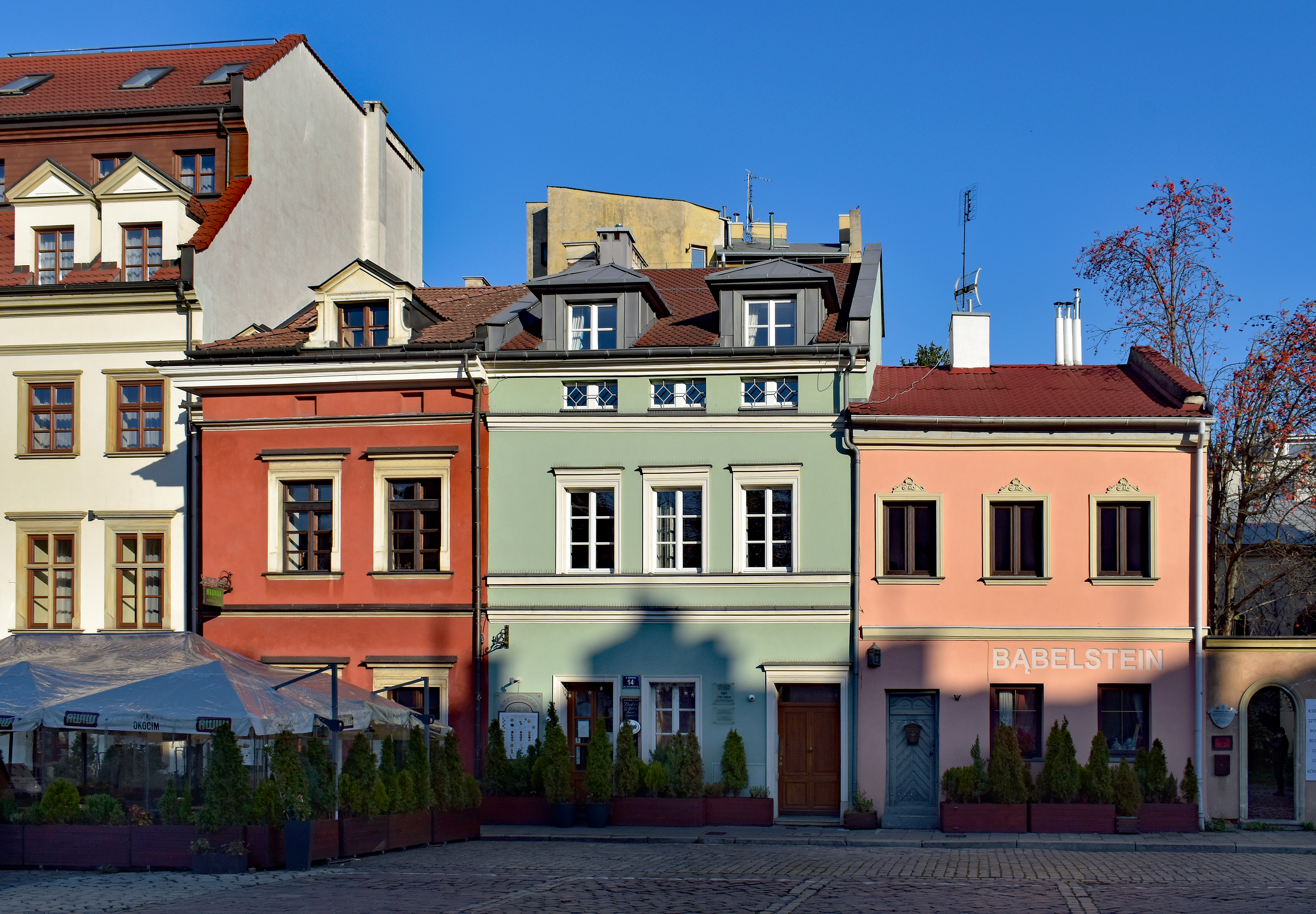
One of the many houses where the family lived in Kraków's Kazimierz district

Helena Rubinstein was born Chaja Rubinstein on December 25, 1872, into the Kazimierz district of Kraków, then part of Austria-Hungary following the partitions of Poland. She was the eldest of eight daughters born to Polish Jews, Gitel Scheindel "Augusta" Rubinstein (née Silberfeld) and Naftali Herz "Horace" Rubinstein, a shopkeeper in Kraków.

She briefly studied medicine in Switzerland.

She was the cousin of the existentialist philosopher Martin Buber and of Ruth Rappaport's mother.

== Career ==
=== Australia ===
Rubinstein emigrated with no financial security and little command of the English language from Poland to Australia, after declining an arranged marriage, in 1896. She found accommodation with her uncle, a shopkeeper in Coleraine, in the Western Victoria region. This was an area with sheep-farming industry that produced lanolin, one of the ingredients of the face creams she had brought with her from Poland. She developed the idea to use lavender, pine bark, and water lilies to mask the lanolin's pungent odour in the creams she began to produce herself. She soon found enthusiastic buyers for the jars of beauty cream in her luggage, and, spotting a market for them, began to make her own. The key ingredient was lanolin, which was readily at hand.

After a disagreement with her uncle and a period employed as a governess, Rubinstein began working as a waitress at the Winter Garden tearooms in Melbourne. There, she secured a loan of £100 from James Thompson, the general manager of the Robur Tea Company to invest in the production and launch of a face cream called "Crème Valaze". She subsequently opened a salon in Melbourne. According to Angus Trumble of the National Portrait Gallery of Australia, Rubinstein claimed that her cream was "made with rare herbs from the Carpathian Mountains and imported from Russia", whereas it consisted mostly of lanolin, wax, and cheap perfume, manufactured in Melbourne by Felton Grimwade in Flinders Lane. It cost around sixpence to make and was sold for six shillings, so made very large profits. It was sold with the slogan "Beauty is power".

Her business expanded to Sydney within five years, and she moved there in 1902. It was soon so successful, that it generated enough revenue to fund a salon called "Salon de Beauté Valaze" in London.

=== London and Paris ===
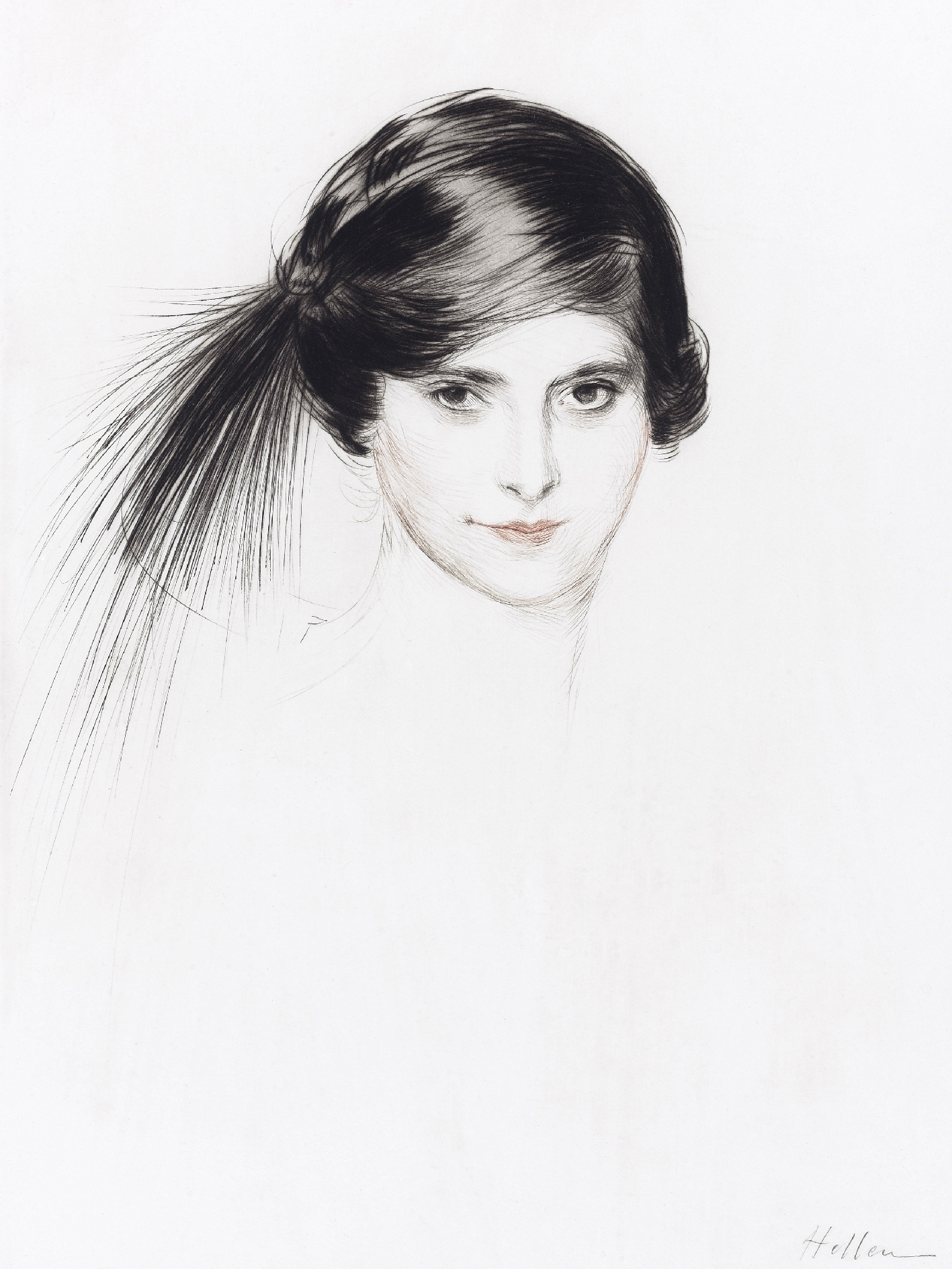
Helena Rubinstein by Paul César Helleu (1908)

In 1908, her sister Ceska took over the management of the Melbourne salon, allowing Helena to relocate to London to expand internationally. She financed the move herself, since women were not yet allowed to obtain business loans from banks.

In the same year, she married the Polish-born American journalist Edward William Titus in London. After their two sons were born, the family eventually moved to Paris, France, where she opened a salon in 1912. Her husband helped with the salon's publicity material and set up a small publishing house.

=== United States ===
Rubinstein and Titus relocated to New York City at the outbreak of World War I (1914), where she opened a cosmetics salon in 1915, the forerunner of a chain throughout the country. During that period, she competed openly with another successful female cosmetics entrepreneur, Elizabeth Arden. The two businesses pursued similar business strategies, seeking celebrity endorsement, perceived value of overpricing, and marketing claims anchored pseudoscience of skincare. The rivalry with Arden lasted all her life.

From 1917, Rubinstein took on the manufacturing and wholesale distribution of her products directly. In 1928, she sold the American business to Lehman Brothers for $7.3 million, (equal to $127 million in 2022). Following the onset of the Great Depression, she repurchased the company's stock, by then greatly reduced in value, for under $1 million and later grew the company's value to $100 million, with salons and outlets operating in nearly a dozen US cities.

Her spa at 715 Fifth Avenue included a restaurant, a gymnasium and rugs by painter Joan Miró.

Rubinstein's cosmetics empire made her one of the richest women in the world.

In 1959, Rubinstein represented the US cosmetics industry at the American National Exhibition in Moscow.

== Portraits ==
Rubinstein commissioned Spanish artist Salvador Dalí to design a powder compact as well a portrait of herself in 1943, titled Princess Arthchild Gourielle-Helena Rubinstein.

American artist Andy Warhol drew a stylized portrait of Rubinstein in Kyoto, Japan in 1956. Other artists who painted her portrait were Graham Sutherland in 1957 for the Helena Rubinstein Foundation (now in the National Portrait Gallery of Australia); Marie Laurencin in 1934 (now in the US National Portrait Gallery); Raoul Dufy (1930), and Roberto Montenegro (1941). After Rubinstein's last visit to Australia, William Dobell painted a series of eight portraits in 1957.

== Personal life ==
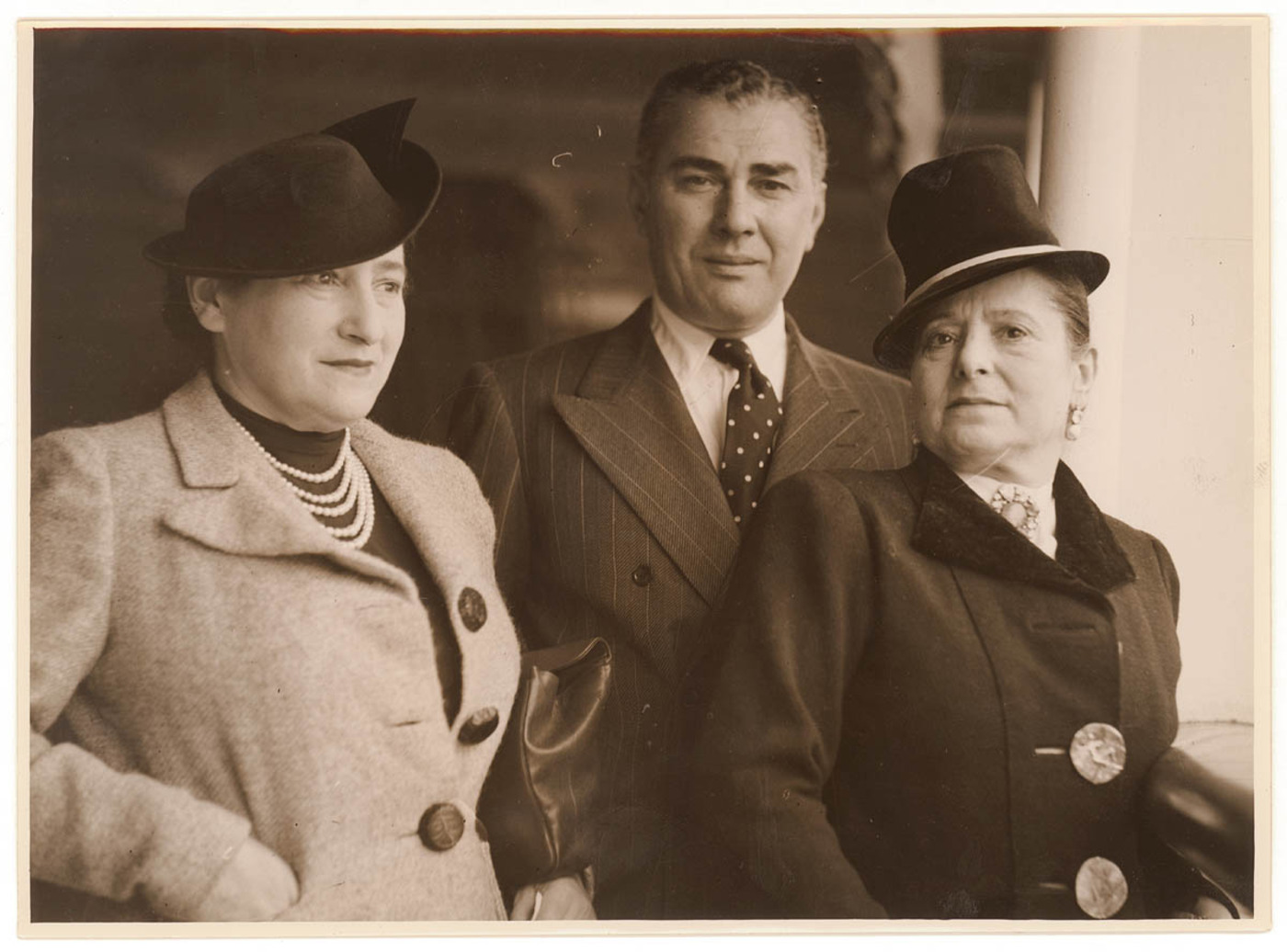
Rubinstein and Prince Gurielli-Tchkonia in 1938

In 1908, Rubinstein married the Polish-born American journalist Edward William Titus in London. Their two sons, Roy Valentine Titus (December 12, 1909 – June 18, 1989) and Horace Titus (April 23, 1912 – May 18, 1958), were born in London.

Following her divorce from Titus in 1938, Helena married Prince Artchil Gourielli-Tchkonia (sometimes spelled Courielli-Tchkonia; born in Georgia, February 18, 1895, died November 21, 1955) who was 23 years younger than his new wife. His claim to the Gourielli title from Georgian nobility derived from his grandmother's side of the family. Rubinstein later named a male cosmetics line after her second husband.

== Death and legacy ==
Rubinstein never retired. She died on April 1, 1965, aged 95, of natural causes, and was buried in Mount Olivet Cemetery in Queens. Her business was valued at more than $US60 million at her death. Some of her estate, including African and fine art, Lucite furniture, and Victorian furniture upholstered in purple, was auctioned in 1966 at the Parke-Bernet Galleries in New York City.

In 1953, she established the philanthropic Helena Rubinstein Foundation. Rubinstein first awarded scholarships to young women to fund higher education and to pursue nontraditional careers. The foundation later widened its scope, including the arts, community service, and health. Diane Moss led the foundation from 1968 until its closure. From 2008, the foundation funded scholarships for continuing education students at City University of New York (CUNY) colleges, and provided ongoing grants to the university. In 2011, the foundation gifted $2 million to CUNY to endow the scholarship fund, enabling these students to access funding for their programs in perpetuity. The foundation, which closed in 2011, ultimately distributed nearly $130 million over the course of its existence, primarily to education, arts, and community-based organizations in New York City. At the time of its closure, its assets included over 600 photographs, which were bestowed to the Fashion Institute of Technology of the State University of New York, as well as 27 portraits of Rubenstein by artists including Salvador Dali, Pavel Tchelitchew, and Marie Laurencin, which were auctioned by Sotheby's.

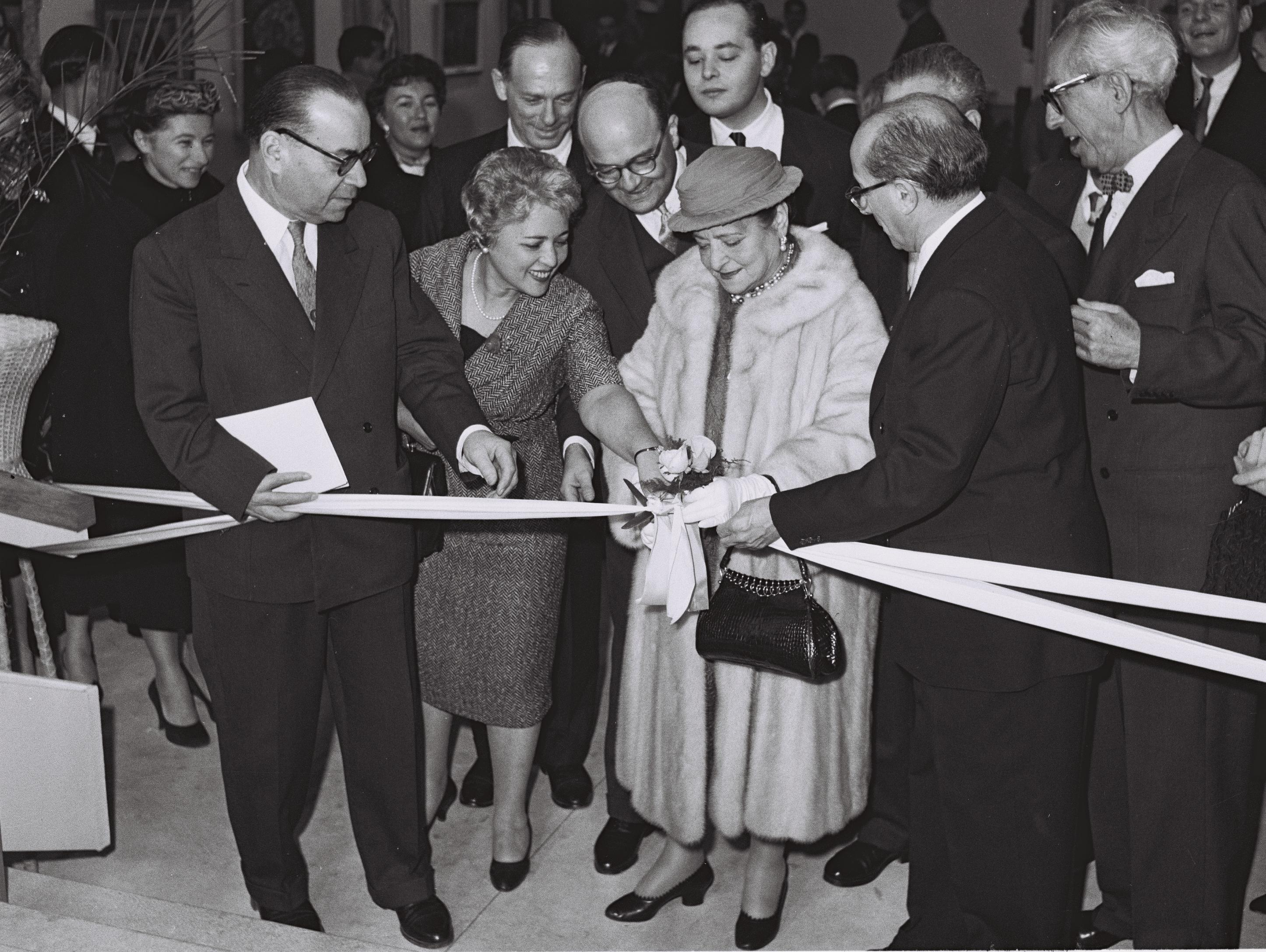
Helena Rubinstein 1959 Tel Aviv Museum of Art

Rubinstein founded the Helena Rubinstein Pavilion of Contemporary Art at the Tel Aviv Museum of Art, which opened in 1959, and in 1957 she established the Helena Rubinstein Travelling Art Scholarship in Australia, funded by her foundation.

A one-off Rubinstein Mural Prize was awarded in 1958 to Erica McGilchrist for her work in the Women's College at the University of Melbourne.

The Helena Rubinstein Portrait Prize was an annual prize of £300 for portraiture by an Australian artist between 1960 and 1966, mostly staged at the Claude Hotchin Gallery in Western Australia.

The Manhattan Jewish Museum hosted the exhibition "Helena Rubinstein: Beauty Is Power", the first museum show devoted to Rubinstein, from October 31, 2014, until March 22, 2015.

=== The company after her death ===
In 1973, the company Helena Rubinstein, Inc. was sold to Colgate-Palmolive. By the 1980s the brand had grealy declined in the US market. In 1984 it was acquired by L'Oréal.. Jacques Corrèze, who engineered the takeover, has a past being active in expropriating Jewish property in Paris. The brand was re-launched in the US market in 1999 but without much commercial success despite good performance in Asia, Europe, and South America. The US operation was therefore closed down in 2003. Since 2011, L'Oréal has been repositioning the brand as an ultra-premium skin care franchise. As of 2023, high-end Helena Rubinstein products remain unavailable in the US but are sold in international markets.

== In literature and popular culture ==
A scholarly study of her exclusive beauty salons and how they blurred and influenced the conceptual boundaries at the time among fashion, art galleries, the domestic interior, and versions of modernism is explored by Marie J. Clifford in the journal Winterthur Portfolio in 2003. A feature-length documentary film, The Powder & the Glory (2009) by Ann Carol Grossman and Arnie Reisman, details the rivalry between Rubinstein and Elizabeth Arden.

In her book Ugly Beauty (2011), Ruth Brandon described her methodology:

She knew how to advertise—using 'fear copy with a bit of blah-blah'— and introduced the concept of 'problem' skin types. She also pioneered the use of pseudo-science in marketing, donning a lab coat in many advertisements, despite the fact that her only training had been a two-month tour of European skin-care facilities. She knew how to manipulate consumers' status anxiety, as well: If a product faltered initially, she would hike the price to raise the perceived value.

Based on Woodhead's book, the 2016 musical War Paint dramatizes her rivalry with competitor Elizabeth Arden. After a run Chicago's Goodman Theatre, the show opened on Broadway at the Nederlander Theatre on April 6, 2017, starring Patti LuPone as Rubinstein and Christine Ebersole as Arden.

The comedy Lip Service by the Australian dramatist John Misto chronicles the life and career of Rubinstein and her rivalry with Elizabeth Arden and Revlon. Lip Service premiered April 26, 2017, at the Park Theatre in London, under the title Madame Rubinstein, before opening at Sydney's Ensemble Theatre in August of the same year. Miriam Margolyes starred as Rubinstein.

The early period of Rubinstein's business career was the subject of a Harvard Business School case in 2019.

== See also ==
- History of cosmetics
- List of Polish people § Business
