= Château d'Ételan =

Château in France

Coordinates: 49°27′59″N 0°37′41″E

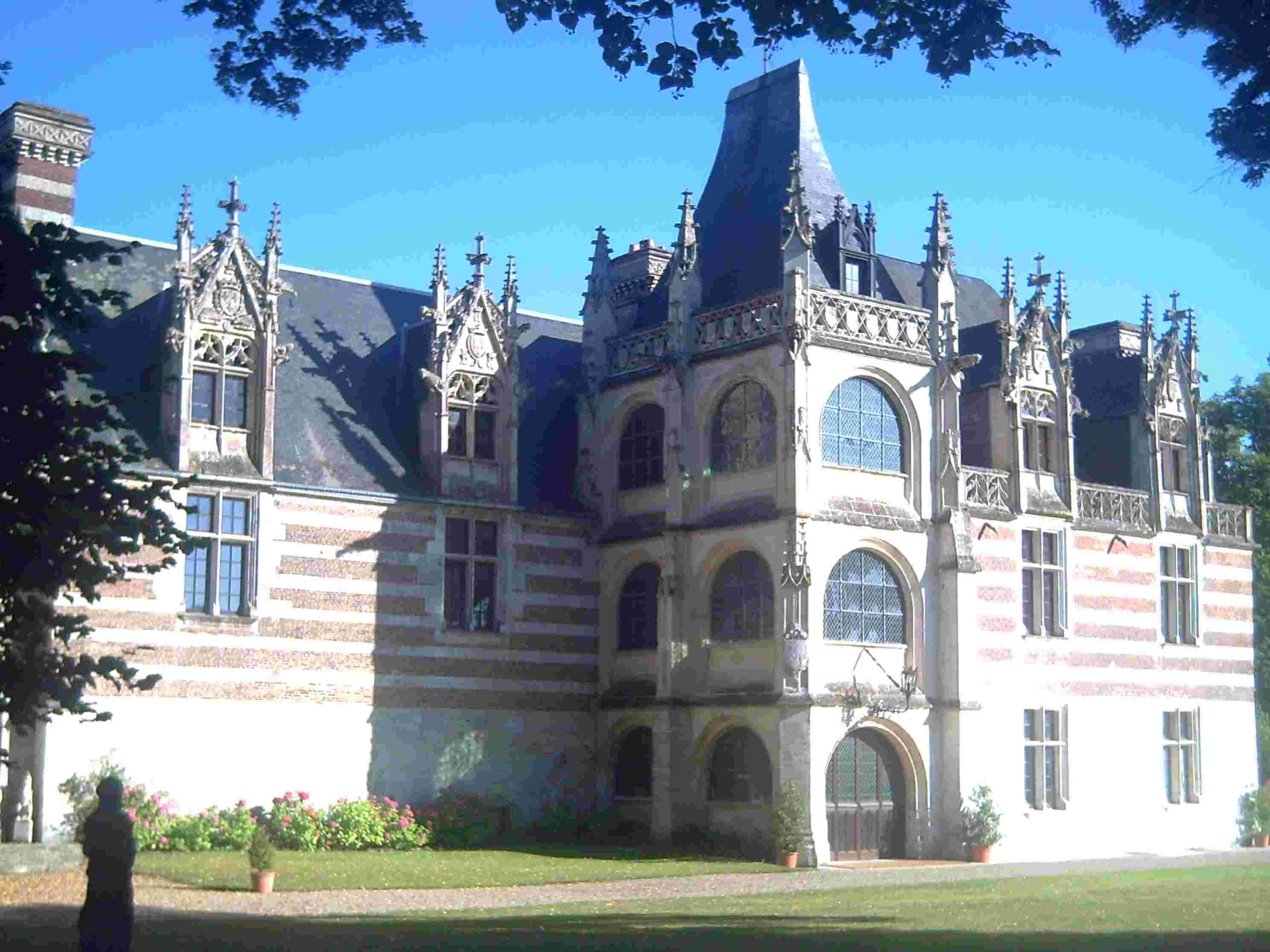
Chateau d'Etelan - Normandy (France).

Location of Château d'Ételan in France.

The Château d'Ételan is a historical building in the commune of Saint-Maurice-d'Ételan in the Seine-Maritime département in Normandy, France. Situated on the right bank of the Seine between the Brotonne and Tancarville bridges, the Château d’Ételan commands a site overlooking the final loop of the river Seine.

Originally designed as a castle, it was later converted to a 15th-century flamboyant gothic mansion.

== Place name ==
It is not known if the village gave its name to the first castle, or the opposite. It was called Esteilant in 1050–1066, from the Old English land and maybe Old English stēġili that means "steep" or "sheer". Many farmers from the Danelaw had settled in Normandy with the Danes in the 10th century, which explains why there are typical Old English place name elements in the Norman toponymy, for example: croft > crot > croc(q): Vannecrocq (Wanescrotum 11th century) = Walshcroft, Lincolnshire or stān > esta(i)n, éta(i)n: Fatouville-Grestain (Grestano 11th century) = Garston, Hertfordshire (Grestan 11th century) 'great stone', etc.

Simon the Norman is well known in England from the story of his dismissal and disgrace by Henry III early in 1240, but less as Master Simon of Steland (or Steyland, de Esteilant, de Esteyland) whom Henry presented to the archdeaconry of Norfolk in May 1237. He originated from this place.

== History ==
In 1494 Louis Picart, magistrate of Troyes and Tournaisis, friend and chamberlain of King Louis XII with whom he went to Italy, undertook the construction of the chateau.

In August 1563, the Regent, Catherine de' Medici and the young King Charles IX visited Ételan, having just recaptured Le Havre from the English (27 July 1563). Thus it was in Ételan that Regent, advised by Michel de l'Hôpital decided to proclaim one year early the majority of the King (4 August 1563).

At Ételan she had drawn up, signed and sealed the letter proclaiming "the King’s of age" convening the Parliament of Rouen to register the summons.

History or legend tells us that the following people have spent time at Ételan : Louis XI (6 June – 13 July 1475), Francis I (during the construction of le Havre), Catherine de' Medici and Charles IX with the future kings Henry III and Henry IV, Marguerite de Navarre and Michel de l'Hôpital (August, 1563), Voltaire (1723–1724). André Caplet, composer and winner of the Grand Prix of Rome often stayed in Ételan and composed some of his works there including Mass for three voices.

== Description ==
The château is listed as a monument historique in the Historical Monuments File of the French Ministry of Culture. Completed in 1494 by Louis Picart, the Château d’Ételan was built on the site of a fortress which has been destroyed under the order of Louis XI. Of the medieval construction, only the cellar, the castle wall and the guard house dating from 1350 remain.

Constructed in a flamboyant Gothic style, it is the contemporary with the Law Court and the hôtel de Bourgtheroulde in Rouen and as old as the Château de Clères. The building consists of two dwellings built from layers of bricks and stones and joined by a magnificent stone staircase dating from the first Renaissance.

As integral part of the main building, the chapel, dedicated to Mary Magdalene, include stained glass windows, wall paintings and statues which characterised the first Norman Renaissance.

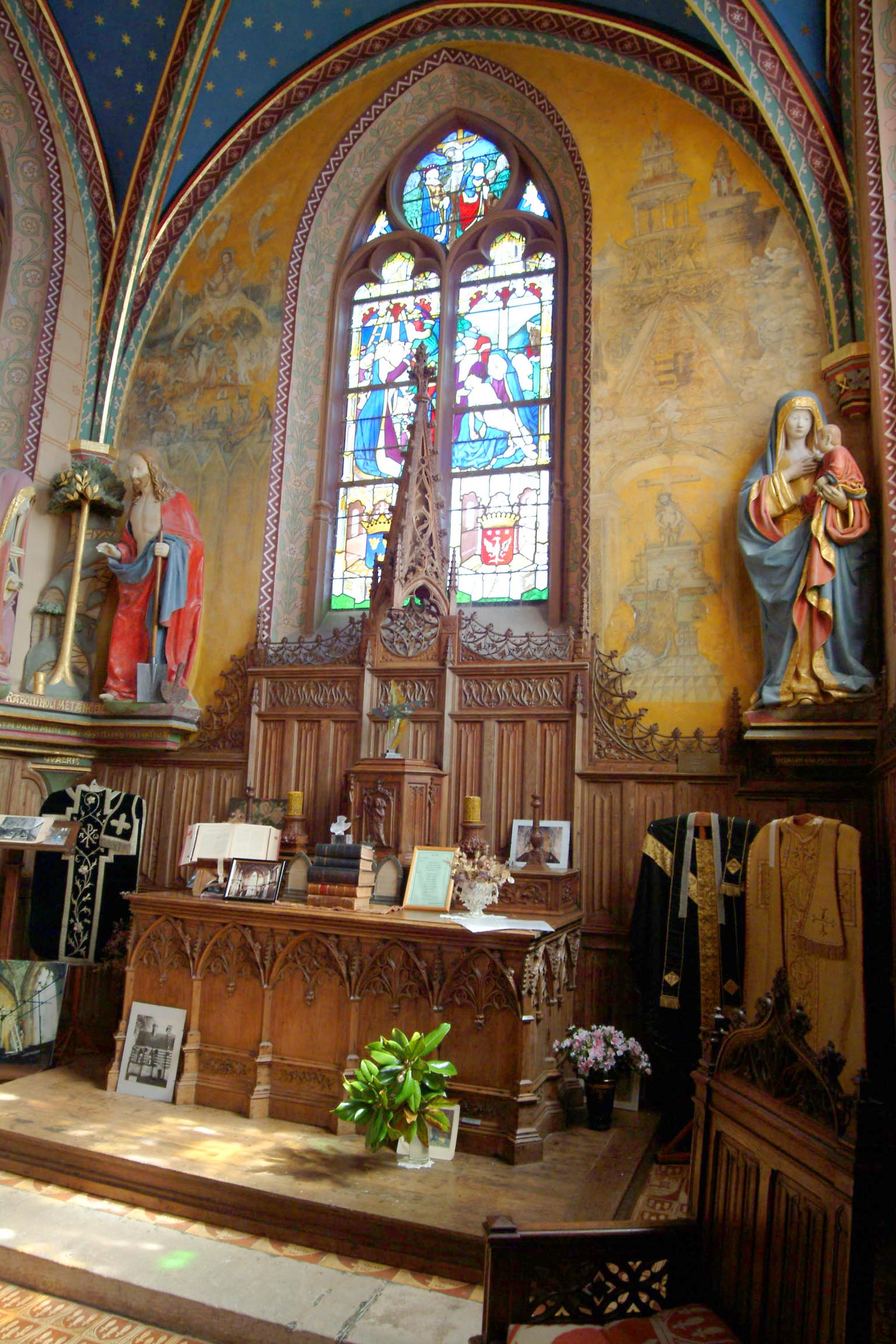
The chapel

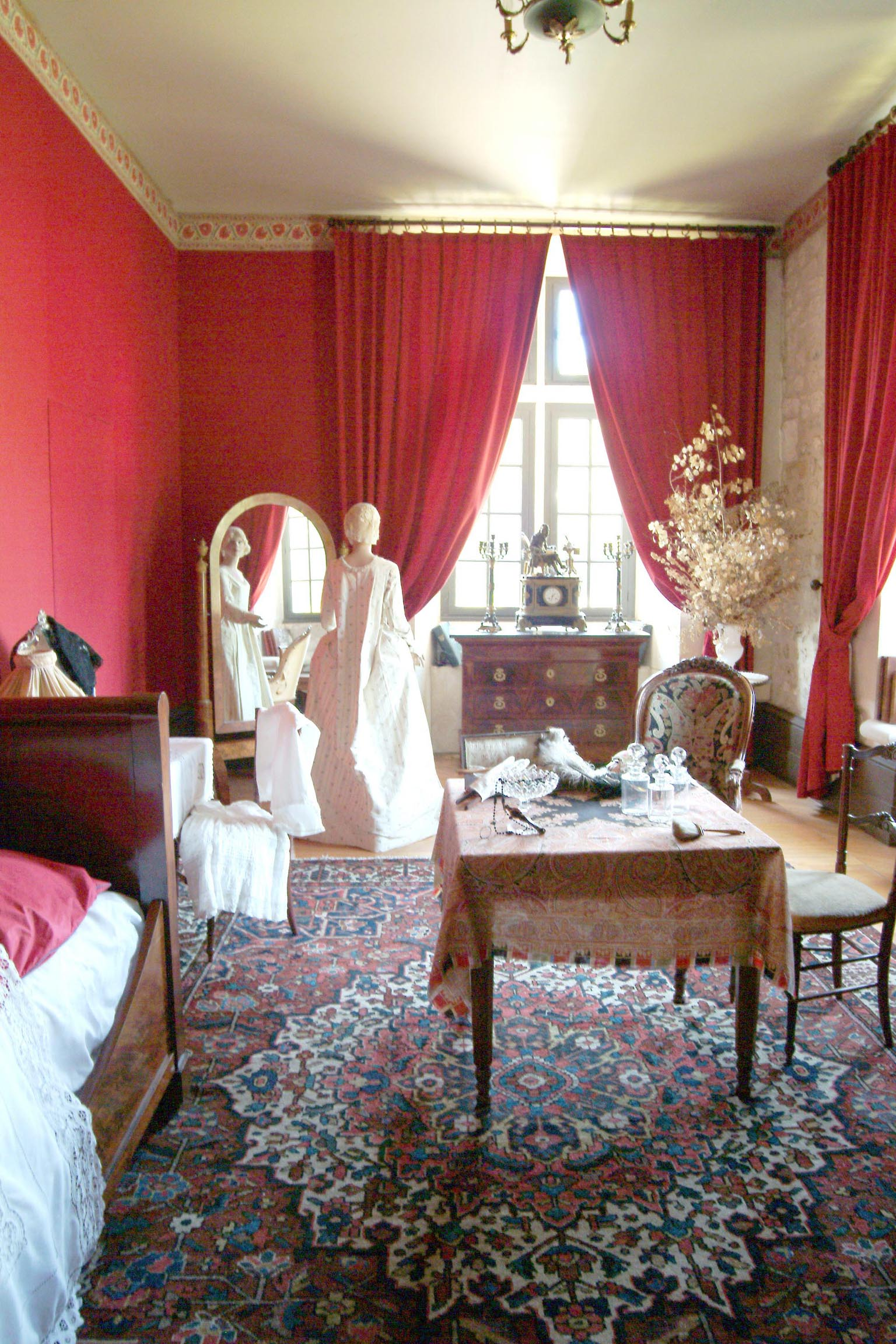
The "antichambre de la Reine"

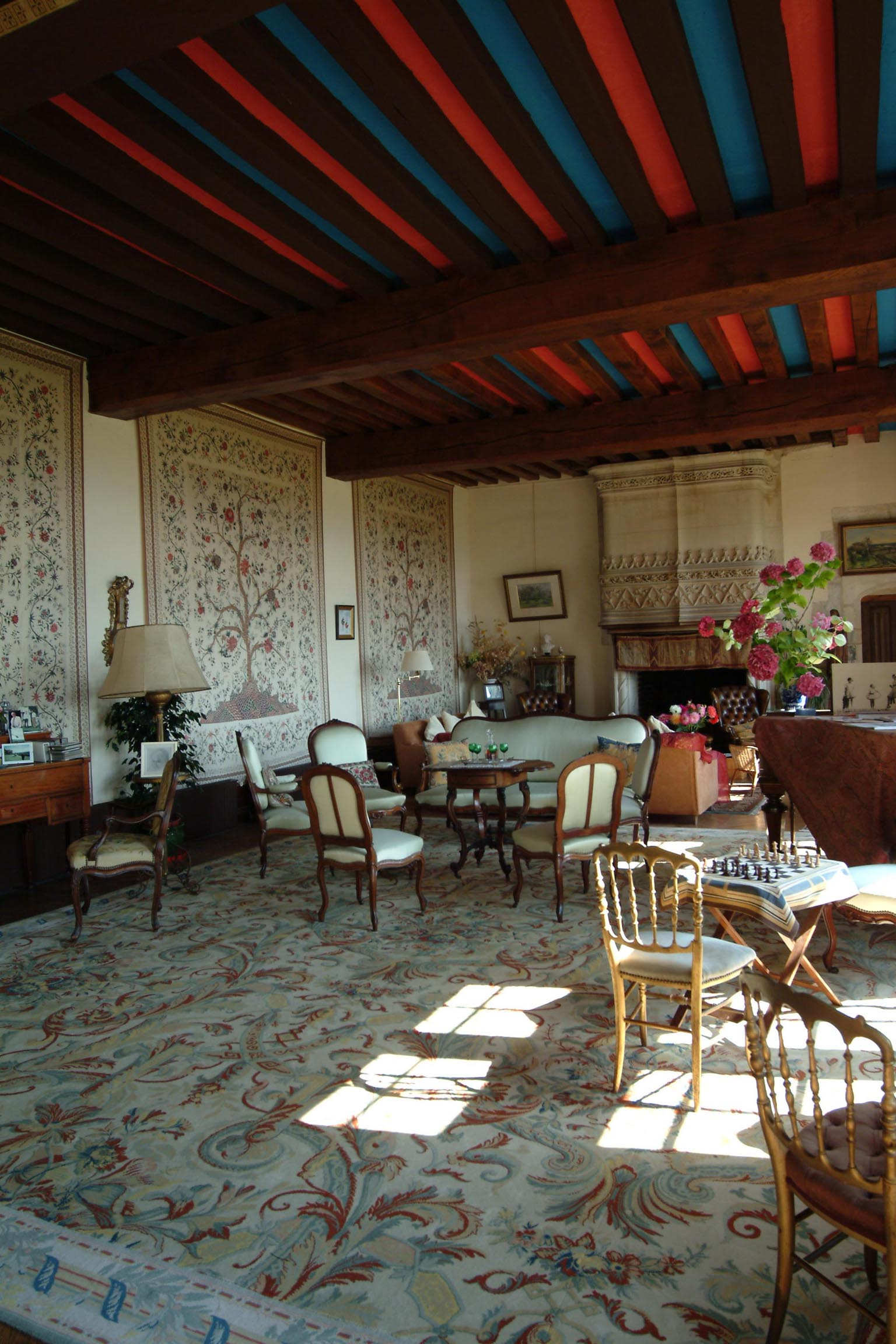
The "Grand salon"

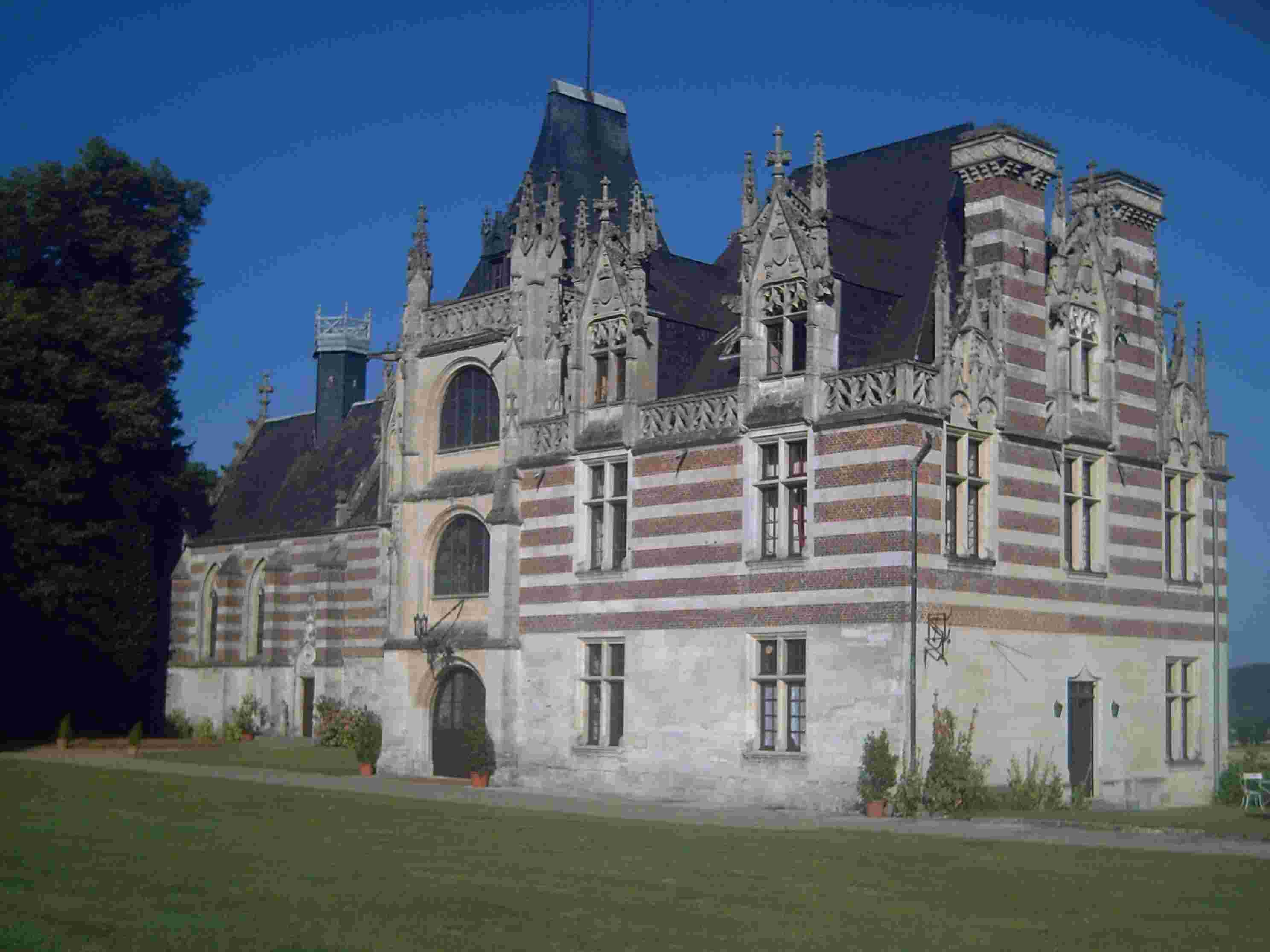
Château d'Ételan (East)

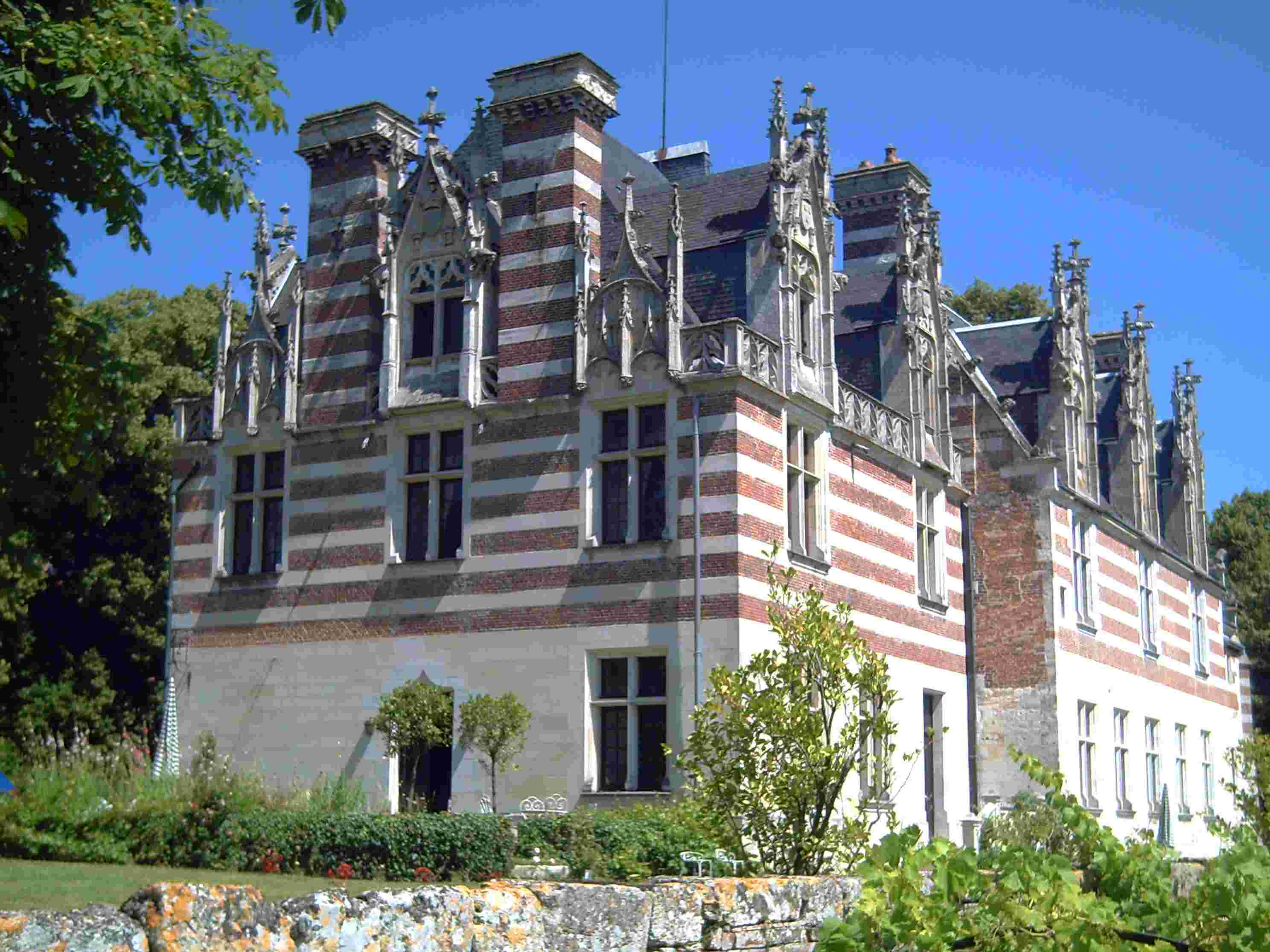
Château d'Ételan (West)

== See also ==
- Normandy
- Pays de Caux
- List of castles in France
