= Helena Rubinstein Incorporated =

Cosmetics company founded in 1902

- Type: Subsidiary
- Founded: 1902; 124 years ago
- Founder: Helena Rubinstein
- Headquarters: Levallois-Perret, Hauts-de-Seine, Île-de-France, France
- Area served: Austria, Belgium, China, France, Germany, Hong Kong, Italy, Japan, Malaysia, Netherlands, Singapore, South Korea, Spain, Switzerland, Taiwan, Thailand, United Kingdom
- Key people: Myriam Bekkar Schneider (Global Brand President)
- Products: Cosmetics, and skin care
- Parent: L'Oréal Group S.A. (since 1984 (Japanese and Latin American markets); since 1988 (entire company)); Albi International (1980–1984 (complete ownership); 1984–1988 (all markets except Japan and Latin America)); Colgate-Palmolive (1973–1980); Lehman Brothers (1928–1930 (American branch))
- Subsidiaries: Current; Helena Rubinstein brand Former; House of Gourielli for Men
- Website: helenarubinstein.com

Helena Rubinstein Incorporated is a major cosmetics, and skin care company and brand that was founded in 1902 by Helena Rubinstein. As of 1988, the company is a wholly owned subsidiary of L'Oréal Group S.A.. Before being completely owned by L'Oréal, it was jointly owned by both L'Oréal and Albi International. Other notable former owners are Colgate-Palmolive and Lehman Brothers, the latter of which owned the American branch of the company.

== History ==
=== Origins and company 1902 to 1965 ===
==== Origins and Australian beginning ====
Helena Rubinstein, in the 1890s, had begun to study medicine, in Switzerland, at the age of 18. Around the same time as her youth, Rubinstein was introduced to a special cream from Polish actress, Helena Modjeska, that was created especially for her, which would go on to be called La Crème Valaze (English: Valaze Cream). The cream was crafted through a recipe from a Polish doctor and scientist. The cream was said to be made of a mixture of herbs, bark, and almond, but was really made of vegetable oil, mineral oil and wax. With the wax often being lanolin.

Rubinstein was later set to be married in arranged marriage, but refused the marriage. As a result, she emigrated to Australia to live with an uncle, after being sent there by her mother. The uncle lived in Coleraine in what is now the Western District of the Australian State of Victoria. Before she left, Rubinstein and her mother had packed 12 jars of the Valaze Cream to be taken with Rubinstein to Australia. When Rubinstein was in Coleraine, the local women noticed how her complexion was and wanted to know the cream she was using to keep her complexion and to protect her skin from the harsh sun damage in Australia. Rubinstein started selling the cream to the local women, which proved to be successful as she ended up having to order and reorder the cream over and over again.

After the success in Coleraine with selling the Valaze cream, Rubinstein moved to Melbourne, and opened a salon, laboratory, and boutique selling not only the Valaze cream, but other creams, lotions, and soaps. The business opened in 1902, on the Main Street (Collins Street). She would also install a cabin in there and invent the concept of a beauty institute (Beauty School), which she called a "boutique-institute". Rubinstein would later open up a salon, laboratory, boutique, beauty institute in Sydney, within the following years. The two Australian salons became so profitable that they were able to finance a Salon de Beauté Valaze (English: Valaze Beauty Salon) in London, as such allowing Rubinstein to form one of the world's first cosmetics companies.

==== Move to London and later Paris ====
In 1908, Rubinstein's sister, Ceska, took over operations of the Australian salons, while Helena Rubinstein herself, took the money she had saved up, about $100,000 (Australian), and moved to London to begin what would eventually become an international enterprise and empire. The reason why she had to save up money to pursue the venture in London, was that women were not allowed to take out loans at the bank at that point in time. The London salon opened in 1908 and was profitable. London high society was at an all time high under King Edward VII of the U.K., very luxurious and pleasure loving. Wealth allowed the women of high society London to pursue the illusive goal of beauty much to the profit of Helena Rubinstein. After the death and state funeral of Edward VII, Rubinstein felt that London was no longer as profitable as it once was due to the city being in mourning. In 1912, Rubinstein moved to Paris, while leaving her sister, Manka, in charge of the London salon, to investigate new business opportunities in the city.

Rubinstein would end up buying a small beauty business and writing letters to some of the smartest women in Paris, offering them a complementary Swedish massage. One of them was French actress, Colette, who would praise massages as essential for women. Rubinstein would also experiment with coal to invent a mascara, for American actress Theda Bara, which would go on to serve as the precursor to her later mascara, "Mascara Matic" years later. Other notable customers during this time period were, French actresses Sarah Bernhardt and Cécile Sorel. Helena Rubinstein stayed in Paris until 1915, when she moved to New York City, due to events and circumstances relating to World War I.

==== Move to New York City, World War I and move back to Paris ====
Before the end of her first year in New York City, Rubinstein opened up her first American salon on West 49th Street in Manhattan. During this time she would begin what was to become a bitter rivalry with Elizabeth Arden and her company, Elizabeth Arden, Inc., that would last for the rest of her life. Rubinstein said of her rival, "With her packaging and my product, we could have ruled the world." Rubinstein adopted various new ideas of the Jazz Age before hurrying back to Paris after World War I ended. With her new ideas, she would always be experimenting for an elusive new beauty idea. Rubinstein would also use her own image in advertising for her company and brand as she thought it was good for business because it was her carefully constructed image, her style, and her singularity and beauty that women were getting when purchasing her products. Beauty treatments and how to demonstrations were becoming very popular at her salons during this time as well, along with the first modern face masks. Skin toning and skin cleansing had become an art during this period.

By frequently traveling between Europe and the United States on luxury cruise liners, Rubinstein was able to keep her empire together, reading the newspapers every day. During the beginning of the latter half of the 1920s, the world may have appeared carefree, but Rubinstein felt that something troubling was on the horizon. As a result, she sold the American branch of Helena Rubinstein Incorporated to Lehman Brothers for about $8 million in cash in 1928. About a year later, in October 1929, the Wall Street crash of 1929 occurred, in which the world economy plummeted, along with the company's stock, which at its 1929 high had stood at 26 1/4, hitting 1/8. Rubinstein waited until 1930 before reacquiring the American branch of the company, by writing to many stockholders and shareholders, who were mostly women, enabling her to secure their proxy vote, as well as by buying any shares that came on the market. Then she forced Lehman Brothers to sell the company back to her for her price of about $1–2 Million, cheap when compared to her original selling price of about $8 Million, thus profiting off of the original sale of the company. Harvard Business School even did a case study on this episode of both Helena Rubinstein and her company.

==== Move back to New York City. World War II and its aftermath ====
In 1938, after marrying Prince Artchil Gourielli-Tchkonia, a Georgian aristocrat, Rubinstein and her new husband moved back to New York City fulltime. In the late 1930s and into the 1940s, more and more women were influenced by advertising by the beauty industry and thought that if they worked hard and spent about 30 minutes per day on a beauty routine they could achieve the Rubinstein look. By the end of the 1930s, the once small company had become an empire. Rubinstein's sister, Ceska, was in charge in London, another sister, Manka, was in charge in Paris, and other sisters were employed in the business as well. Middle-class women, in addition to high-society women, started to purchase products from the company and brand. The business greatly expanded as a result, allowing a variety of cosmetics and makeup to be sold globally with display materials always linking Rubinstein to the products that had her name.

When World War II started, Rubinstein kept her factories in the United States running at full capacity, with more and more new concepts being developed by the day, while the beauty industry climbed from millions to billions. After World War II ended, more prosperity and expansion occurred in the United States which allowed Helena Rubinstein products to be sold not just in her salons, but department stores as well, where women were able to purchase one of the 466 preparations that bore her name. Salons were later expanded to include spas and workout gyms allowing women to exercise, receive beauty advice, and have special Rubinstein products made for them. Treatment lessons, mostly instructed by Rubinstein's niece, Mala, were also popular at the salons as well. Personal massages, facial misting, deep steaming, rubber masks, bubble baths, eye lift classes, and eyelash dying, were all also offered, which at the time was the latest trendy beauty treatments.

==== Brief venture into men's cosmetics ====
In the 1940s, Rubinstein launched the House of Gourielli for Men, introducing fresh fragrances for men, as well as a barber shop, and boutique for men. It was revolutionary, but wasn't profitable, and was closed down in the 1950s. Even though men would get their own cosmetics industry in later decades, she's still considered to be a pioneer in men's cosmetics.

==== Expansion during the 1950s and company during the later years of the founder's lifetime ====
Rubinstein would constantly look for new products that would attract the post-war generation, as the business grew bigger and bigger with advertising becoming even more important. Discoveries would become miracles. She launched products containing Vitamin A and stressed its benefits, as early as 1954. In 1958, she launched beauty creams, oils, lotions, and foundations with hormones in them. Estrogen was the primary hormone used in these products. Rubinstein would also utilize television to carry her beauty messages to more and more women. She would also open more factories to cater to the increased demand for her products.

The United States Food and Drug Administration would eventually crackdown on some of her products and restrict them and/or ingredients that could be used in them.

The ingredients in the products would include pure silk, water lily pads, cucumber juice, Irish moss, and Italian parsley and seaweed, among others. Various problems were attended to, with new scents, masks, complexion colors, and even a new primitive color computer called "Complexion Colorama".

As the 1950s drew on, Rubinstein's niece, Mala, began to play a larger role at the company due to her being the only one showing interest in the empire created by Rubinstein. While in 1959, Helena Rubinstein would represent herself, her brand, and the American cosmetics industry at 1959 World's Fair in Moscow. Russian women would flock to her pavilion to see her demonstrations. Rubinstein would continue to look for new beauty ideas wherever she was in the world. Even in her later years, she still had input in her company and would frequently visit her factories. Rubinstein would even continue to rule her empire even when she had to be in bed most of the time due to her age and would even go as far as to have boardroom meetings in her bedroom. On 1 April 1965, Helena Rubinstein died of natural causes at age 92.

=== Company after the 1965 death of the founder ===
==== Ownership of the company and brand ====
After the death of Helena Rubinstein in 1965, a period of successive sales of the company and brand began. The company was first sold to Colgate-Palmolive in 1973 and they continued to own the company until 1980, when they sold it to Albi International. Albi International owned the entire company before selling part of it in 1984.

The partial selling was to L'Oréal Group S.A., who purchased the Japanese and Latin American divisions and the markets for those divisions. This joint venture partnership continued until 1988, when L'Oréal brought the remainder of the company and has owned the entire company since then.

==== Brand in the United States market ====
The brand and company started in the United States in 1915, and continued to remain on the U.S. market until fully fading away from the market in 1985. The brand tried to make a comeback and was re-launched in the United States in 1999, but was not successful despite having successful resurgences in parts of Asia, Europe, and South America. The brand left the US market again in 2003, and has not returned to the US since, as of 2023.

==== Brand in other markets ====
Despite being gone from the US market, the brand still finds success in other parts of the world, and is sold in international markets, such as parts of Asia, with the brand being available in not only Japan, but later on South Korea, Taiwan, Hong Kong, and China. The brand would eventually would move into Southeast Asia, by expanding into Thailand. In October 2024, the brand announced that it will be opening in Singapore, and in the following month (November 2024), the brand announced its intent to open in Malaysia as well. The brand also relaunched in parts of Europe as well through E-commerce on its website.

==== Products ====
In 1997, "Face Sculptor" was the first treatment sold as a "no-scalpel surgery" complementary to cosmetic surgical procedures.

The launch of "Prodigy Re-Plasty" in 2008 was carried out in partnership with the Laclinic Montreux clinic and laboratory in Montreux, Switzerland, along with collaboration with the University Hospitals of Besançon in Besançon, France, and Liège in Liège, Belgium. In July 2025, it was announced that Re-Plasty had a new enhanced and revitalized formula.

Later, "Collagenist V lift" was released, which acts on sagging and plumpness of the face

In 2009, the company launched the perfume "Wanted", created by Dominique Ropion and Carlos Benaim, a Franco-American fragrance, symbolizing Helena Rubinstein, a woman torn between two continents. From the United States, the fragrance takes lily of the valley and apple, symbols of cleanliness, and from Europe it takes violet and iris, exalting a woody and floral sensuality.

Since the 2010s, L'Oréal Group S.A. has been repositioning the brand as ultra-premium luxury skin care brand. With the tagline: "Avant Garde Skincare Since 1902".

==== Spokespeople ====
American actress Demi Moore is the brand's anti-aging ambassador. Other notable brand ambassadors and/or spokespeople are Michelle Yeoh, Gabrielle Caunesil Pozzoli, Faye Wong, Adriana Lima and Zhang Ruonan.

== Innovations in cosmetics ==
Helena Rubinstein was the inventor of many innovations in the world of beauty and cosmetics, thanks, in part, to her relationships with numerous scientists, as well as, listening to her clients. As mentioned above, in 1902, she invented the concept of cabins (beauty institutes/beauty schools), beauty salons, and beauty boutiques all in one venue.

In 1910, Rubinstein established the classification of skin types. She was the first to state the principle that not all skin types could be treated in the same way, a concept that may seem commonplace today, but was completely innovative at the time. She was the first to think that the first basic care was skin hydration, to imagine using milk as a light emulsion, and was also the first to market a Sunless tanning product.

In 1939, Rubinstein bought a non-exclusive license of the world's first waterproof mascara that the Austrian singer Helene Winterstein-Kambersky had invented ("La Bella Nussy") and in 1958, Rubinstein created the first refillable mascara in a tube ("Mascara Matic"), with a brush to easily spread it on the eyelashes. This mascara, which was enriched with silk fibers (which makes the eyelash more flexible), was renamed "Long Lash" in 1964. She also created a marketing event, in 1939, where she presented her new "waterproof cake mascara" during an aquatic ballet, and in 1941 in New York, for the launch of her third perfume, "Heaven Sent", she organized a release of 5,000 balloons with messages and samples.

Rubinstein was also the first to highlight the essential link between food, nutrition and beauty. As stated above, Rubinstein would talk about the benefits of Vitamin A in 1954. Around 1944, she created "Beauty classes" to teach skincare and makeup techniques, famously stating: "There are no ugly women, only lazy women." Among them were sophisticated facial and neck massages, some of which is still in use today.

== Controversies ==
=== FDA regulation and inspection of products ===
The Food and Drug Administration (FDA) in the United States, was starting to regulate the cosmetics industry as early as the 1930s under the Federal Food, Drug, and Cosmetic Act of 1938 (FFDCA). The FDA would often focus its attention on extravagant beauty claims and ingredients used in cosmetics. Eventually, as stated above, they would restrict the use of certain ingredients that Helena Rubinstein, both her and her brand, along with other brands as well, wanted to use in their products due to increased power under the FFDCA. Rubinstein was not pleased when the FDA cracked down on the cosmetics industry and her products.

=== Controversial L'Oréal takeover ===
The L'Oréal takeover was controversial for both the brand and L'Oréal.

For the Helena Rubinstein brand, it was controversial as the founder of L'Oréal, Eugène Schueller, was a collaborator during World War II, and in its aftermath L'Oréal became notorious for employing ex-Nazis on the run, with one of them being the very man that engineered the takeover of the Helena Rubinstein brand, Jacques Corrèze, who also had been expropriating Jewish property in Paris. Corrèze was also a senior executive at L'Oréal and chairman of Cosmair, which was a private US company and the sole licensee for L'Oréal in the United States, before becoming CEO of the US operations of L'Oréal after Cosmair was integrated into L'Oréal as a subsidiary and was renamed L'Oréal USA.

For L'Oréal, it was controversial as when the Helena Rubinstein brand was acquired by L'Oréal, the brand had a manufacturing plant in Israel, which then prompted a boycott of all L'Oréal products and brands by the Arab League and its members. Corrèze later had to be in charge of negotiations with the Arab governments to comply with the league's requests from its Bureau of Economic Boycotts.
