= André Bettencourt =

French politician

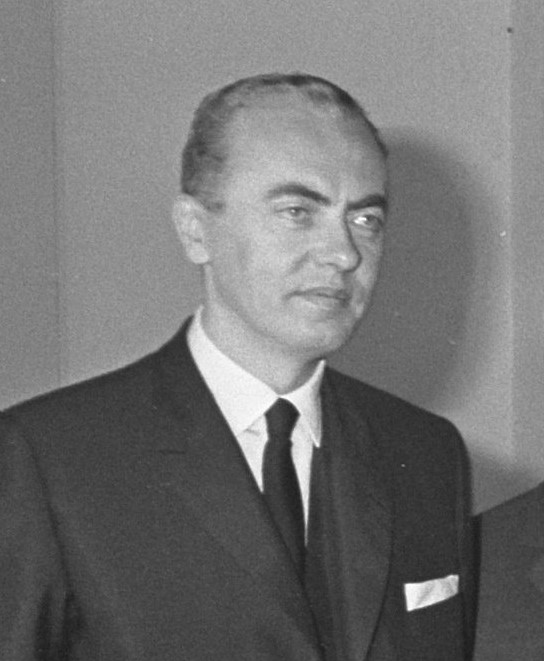
- André Bettencourt in 1967

French Minister of Foreign Affairs
- In office 15 March 1973 – 2 April 1973
- President: Georges Pompidou
- Prime Minister: Pierre Messmer
- Preceded by: Maurice Schumann
- Succeeded by: Michel Jobert

Personal details
- Born: 21 April 1919 Saint-Maurice-d'Ételan, France
- Died: 19 November 2007 (aged 88) Neuilly-sur-Seine, France
- Spouse: Lilianne Schueller (m. 1950)
- Children: Françoise Bettencourt Meyers
- Occupation: Journalist, businessman

André Bettencourt (French pronunciation: [ɑ̃dʁe bɛtɑ̃kuʁ]; 21 April 1919 – 19 November 2007) was a French politician. He had been a member of La Cagoule, a violent French fascist-leaning and anti-communist group, before and into the Second World War; he then joined the anti-German Resistance late in the war. His earlier affiliation was not known when he later served as a cabinet minister under presidents Pierre Mendès France and Charles de Gaulle, and was awarded for his bravery in the Resistance against the Nazis.

== Biography ==
He was born in Saint-Maurice-d'Ételan (Seine-Maritime) in an old Catholic Norman noble family.

Bettencourt served in several posts in the government of France, most notably as interim minister of foreign affairs for two weeks in the spring of 1973. He also served as president of the regional council of Haute-Normandie from 1974 to 1981. In addition, he was the mayor of Saint-Maurice-d'Etelan from 1965 to 1989.

== Controversy ==
In his youth, Bettencourt was a member of La Cagoule (The Hood), a violent French fascist-leaning and anti-communist group. Eugène Schueller, founder of L'Oréal, provided financial support and held meetings for La Cagoule at the company's headquarters. In the 1990s, Jean Frydman, a shareholder and board member of L'Oréal's film and television subsidiary Paravision, alleged that he had been sacked in 1989 as the senior management at L'Oréal sought to avoid an Arab boycott of firms with Jewish links. Frydman held joint French and Israeli citizenship. Frydman also turned up the fact that Bettencourt had written many articles for a Nazi propaganda organ during World War II. From 1940 to 1942, Bettencourt wrote more than 60 articles for La Terre Française, a weekly newspaper that flourished with Nazi German financing during the occupation of France. In a special Easter issue in 1941, he described Jews as 'hypocritical Pharisees' whose 'race has been forever sullied by the blood of the righteous. They will be cursed'. Bettencourt attempted to dismiss the journalism as "errors of youth", claiming that his judgement was clouded by the propaganda of Vichy France. "I have repeatedly expressed my regrets concerning them in public and will always beg the Jewish community to forgive me for them".

== Honours ==
For his acts of resistance during the Second World War, Bettencourt received the French Croix de Guerre 1939–1945 and Resistance Medal and was appointed a Knight of the Legion of Honour.

He was elected a member of the Académie des beaux-arts, one of the five academies of the Institut de France, as an unattached member on 23 March 1988.

== Family ==
In 1950, Bettencourt married Liliane, daughter of Eugène Schueller, the founder of L'Oréal, a leading cosmetics company. They had one daughter, Françoise Bettencourt Meyers, who is a member of L'Oréal's board of directors. Françoise Meyers is married to Jean-Pierre Meyers (*1948), whose grandfather was murdered in Auschwitz concentration camp.

Bettencourt died on 19 November 2007 at the age of 88.

== See also ==
- Jacques Corrèze

Political offices
Preceded by Yves Guéna	Minister of Posts and Telecommunications; 1968	Succeeded by Yves Guéna
Preceded by Albin Chalandon	Minister of Industry; 1968–1969	Succeeded by François-Xavier Ortoli
Preceded by Maurice Schumann	interim Minister of Foreign Affairs; 1973	Succeeded by Michel Jobert
