= Françoise Bettencourt Meyers =

French billionaire heiress (born 1953)

- Born: Françoise Bettencourt; 10 July 1953 (age 73); Neuilly-sur-Seine, France
- Occupation: Businesswoman
- Title: Vice Chairman of L'Oréal
- Spouse: Jean-Pierre Meyers
- Children: 2
- Parent(s): André Bettencourt; Liliane Bettencourt
- Relatives: Eugène Schueller (grandfather)

Françoise Bettencourt Meyers (French: [fʁɑ̃swaz bɛtɑ̃kuʁ mɛjɛʁs]; born 10 July 1953) is a French entrepreneur, philanthropist, writer and billionaire. She is the only child of Liliane Bettencourt and the granddaughter of Eugène Schueller, founder of L'Oréal. She was the world's richest woman for several years. In December 2023, she became the first woman to amass a fortune exceeding US$100 billion. As of 23 October 2026, her estimated net worth was US$103.5 billion, according to Forbes. Her mother died in September 2017, after which her fortune tripled with her investments through her family holding company, Téthys Invest, and the high valuation of L'Oréal shares on the stock exchange.

== Personal life ==
Raised to be Catholic, she has written several Bible commentaries. She is the only child and heir of Liliane Bettencourt. She married Jean-Pierre Meyers, business executive and grandson of a rabbi murdered at Auschwitz. She converted to Judaism and they raised their children, Jean-Victor and Nicolas, as Jewish. Her marriage caused controversy because her grandfather Eugène Schueller, L'Oreal's founder, had been prosecuted for collaboration with the Nazi government. Bettencourt Meyers and her family still own a 33 per cent stake in the company.

In 2008, she sued François-Marie Banier for taking money from her mother, and started proceedings to have her mother declared mentally incompetent. The revelations in the secret recordings that she used in evidence led to the Woerth–Bettencourt scandal. In December 2010, Bettencourt Meyers announced that she had settled out of court with both her mother and Banier.

Her mother died in September 2017 when her net worth was about $39.5 billion.

After a fire severely damaged Notre-Dame de Paris, Bettencourt Meyers and L'Oréal pledged $226 million to repair the cathedral.

== In popular culture ==
The 2025 movie The Richest Woman in the World was loosely based on Bettencourt Meyers' mother, Liliane Bettencourt, and features a character based on Bettencourt Meyers (played by Marina Foïs).

== Bibliography ==
- The Greek Gods. Genealogy (Les Dieux grecs. Généalogies), Paris, éd.
- A Look at the Bible (Regard sur la Bible), 5 vol., Introduction by Alain Decaux, Published November 2008, awarded the prix des Lauriers Verts (section « Spirituality »)

== See also ==
- List of female billionaires
