= Saint-Maurice-d'Ételan =

- Commune
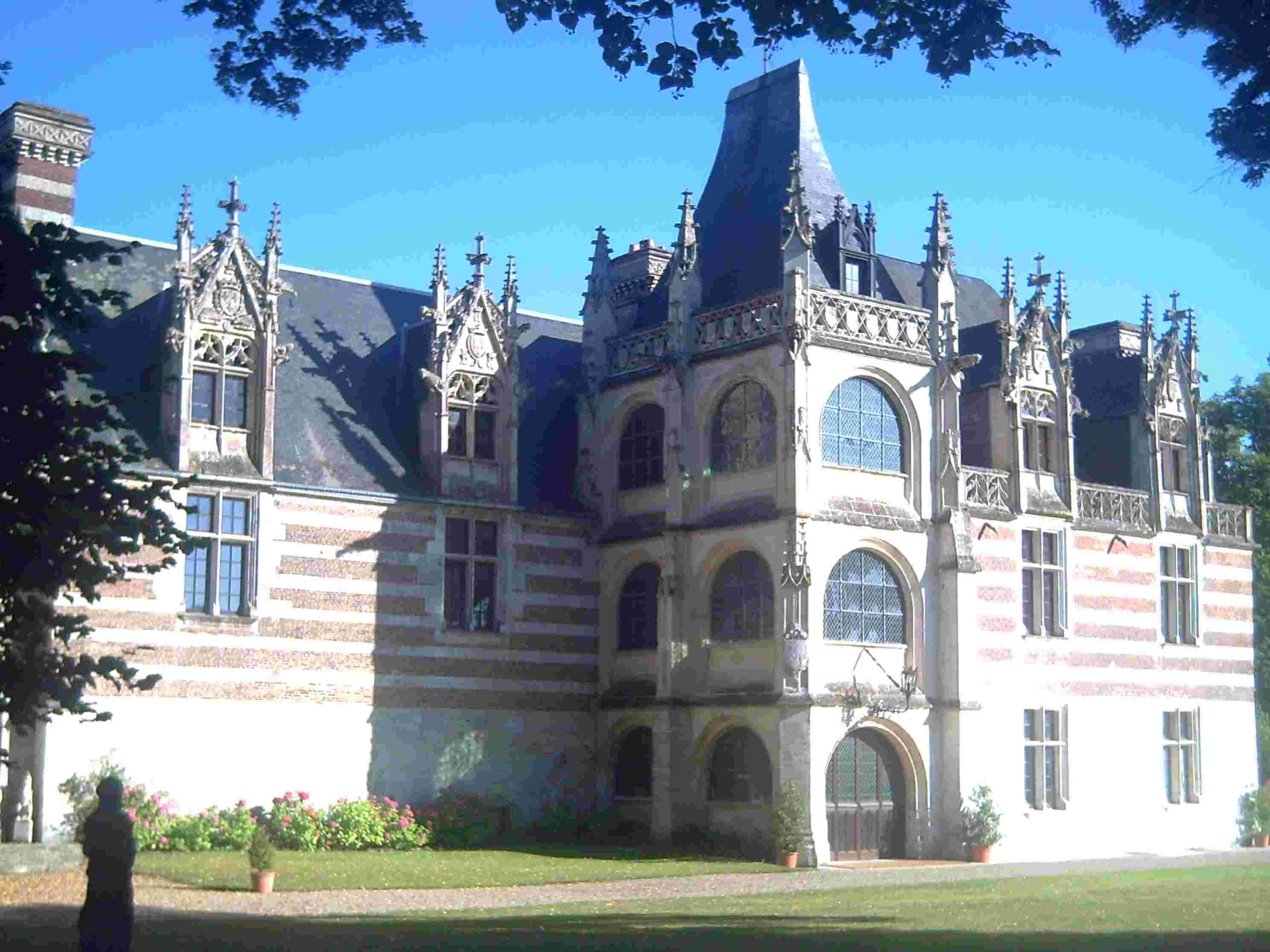
- The chateau of Ételan
- Location of Saint-Maurice-d'Ételan
- Location within France Location within Normandy
- Coordinates: 49°27′36″N 0°36′47″E
- Country: France
- Region: Normandy
- Department: Seine-Maritime
- Arrondissement: Le Havre
- Canton: Port-Jérôme-sur-Seine
- Intercommunality: Caux Seine Agglo

Government
  - Mayor (2020–2026): Franck de Belloy
- Area^{1}: 14.24 km^{2} (5.50 sq mi)
- Elevation: 20 m (66 ft)
- Highest elevation: 121 m (397 ft)
- Lowest elevation: 3 m (9.8 ft)
- Population (2023): 284
  - Density: 19.9/km^{2} (51.7/sq mi)
- Time zone: UTC+01:00 (CET)
  - Summer (DST): UTC+02:00 (CEST)
- INSEE/Postal code: 76622 /76330
- ^{1} French Land Register data, which excludes lakes, ponds, glaciers > 1 km^{2} (0.386 sq mi or 247 acres) and river estuaries.

Saint-Maurice-d'Ételan is a commune in the Seine-Maritime department in the Normandy region in northern France.

== Geography ==
A farming village in the Pays de Caux, situated some 21 miles (34 km) east of Le Havre, on the D81 and D281 roads, by the banks of the meandering river Seine, which forms the commune's southern border.

== Population ==
Historical population
Year	Pop.	±% p.a.
1968	255	—
1975	243	−0.69%
1982	230	−0.78%
1990	211	−1.07%
1999	239	+1.39%
2007	322	+3.80%
2012	317	−0.31%
2017	305	−0.77%
2023	284	−1.18%
Source: INSEE

== Places of interest ==
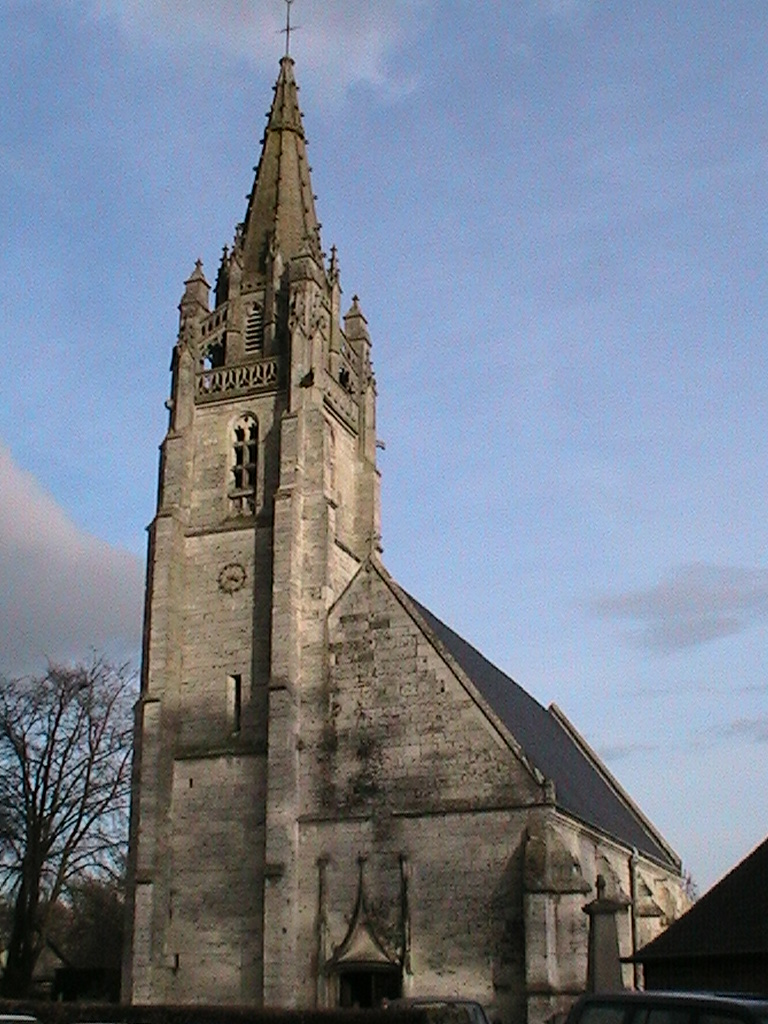
The church

- The church of St. Maurice, dating from the fifteenth century.
- The fourteenth-century chateau.

== People ==
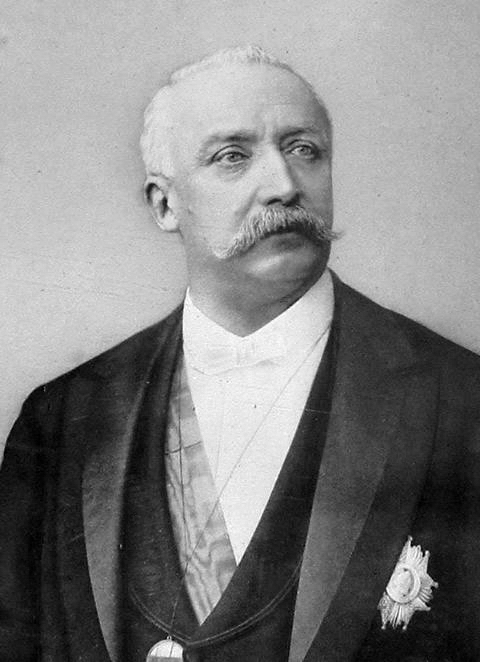
Félix Faure - 7th President of France

- Félix Faure (1841–1899), 7th president of France
- André Bettencourt (1919–2007), government minister
- Ernest Picard-Destelan (in French), French navy officer
- Laurence de Cambronne (1951–), editor in chief of the magazine Elle

== See also ==
- Château d'Ételan
- Communes of the Seine-Maritime department
