= Vannecrocq =

- Commune
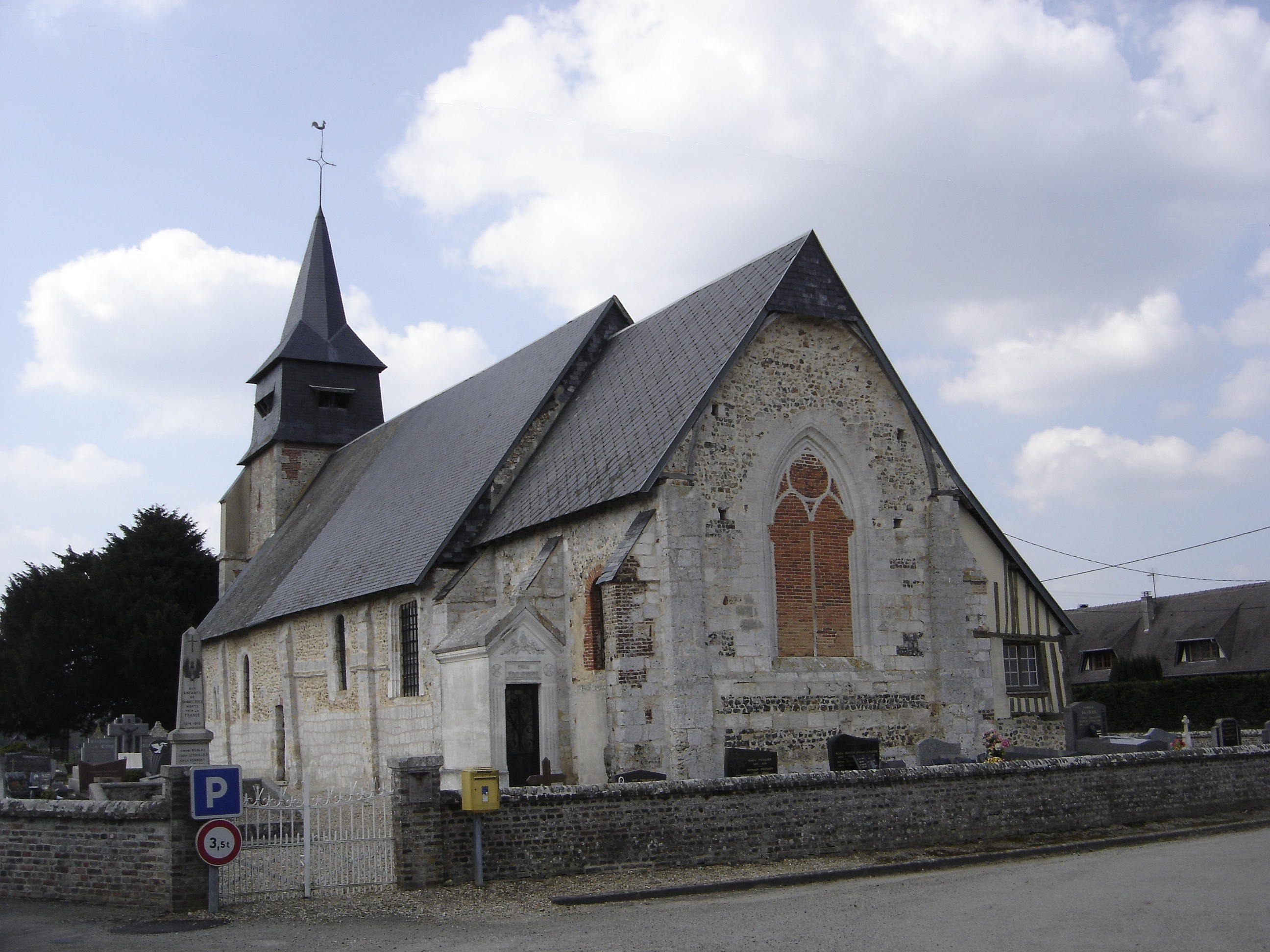
- The church in Vannecrocq
- Location of Vannecrocq
- Location within France Location within Normandy
- Coordinates: 49°18′26″N 0°25′35″E
- Country: France
- Region: Normandy
- Department: Eure
- Arrondissement: Bernay
- Canton: Beuzeville

Government
  - Mayor (2024–2026): Marc-Antoine Rabel
- Area^{1}: 4.93 km^{2} (1.90 sq mi)
- Elevation: 129 m (423 ft)
- Highest elevation: 153 m (502 ft)
- Lowest elevation: 75 m (246 ft)
- Population (2023): 164
  - Density: 33.3/km^{2} (86.2/sq mi)
- Time zone: UTC+01:00 (CET)
  - Summer (DST): UTC+02:00 (CEST)
- INSEE/Postal code: 27671 /27210
- ^{1} French Land Register data, which excludes lakes, ponds, glaciers > 1 km^{2} (0.386 sq mi or 247 acres) and river estuaries.

Vannecrocq (French pronunciation: [vanəkʁo]) is a commune in the Eure department in Normandy in northern France.

== Population ==
Historical population
Year	Pop.	±% p.a.
1968	89	—
1975	100	+1.68%
1982	99	−0.14%
1990	110	+1.33%
1999	110	+0.00%
2007	118	+0.88%
2012	140	+3.48%
2017	153	+1.79%
2023	164	+1.16%
Source: INSEE

== See also ==
- Communes of the Eure department
