= Jacques Corrèze =

French businessman and politician (1912–1991)

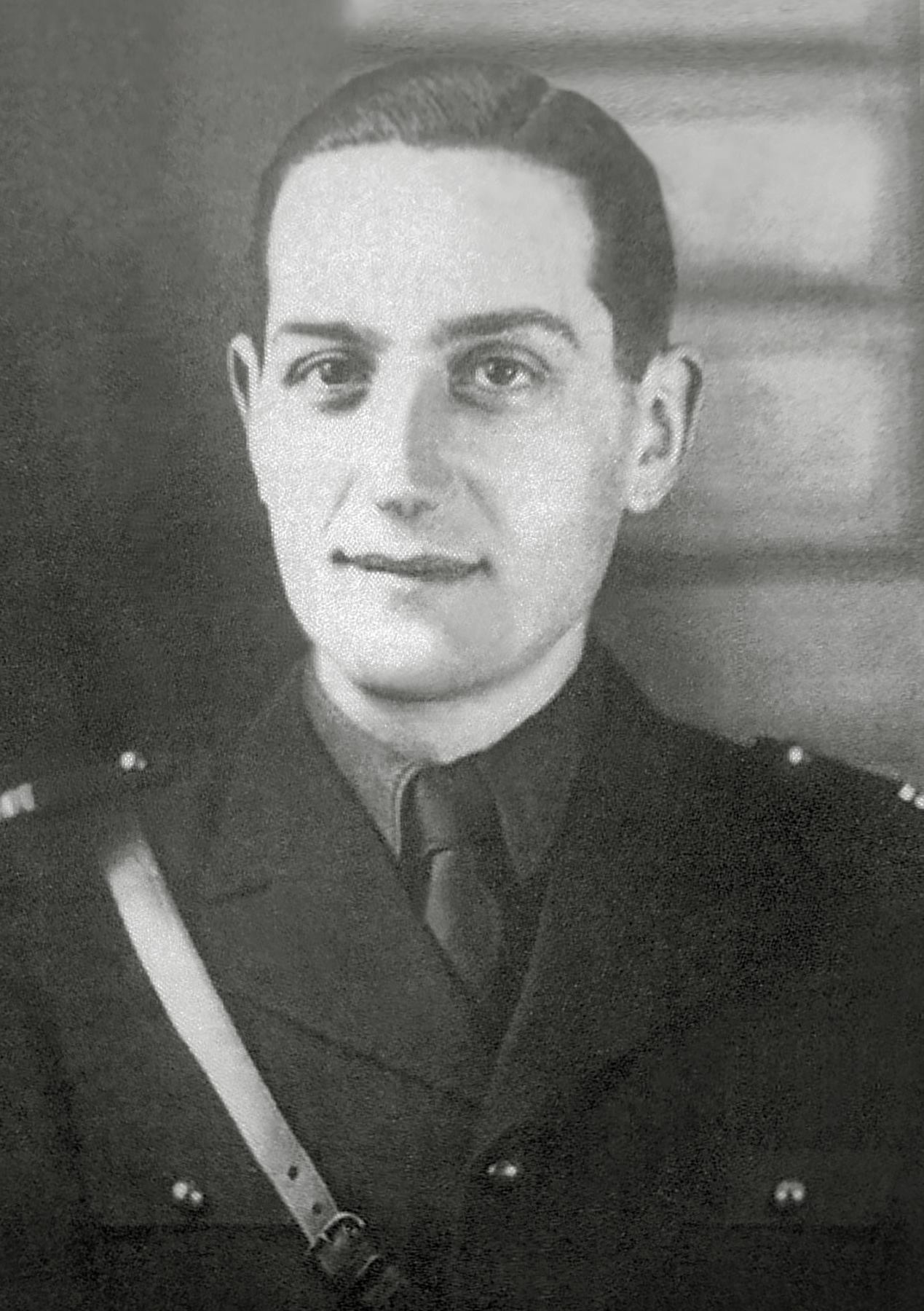
- Born: 11 February 1912; Auxerre, France
- Died: 28 June 1991 (aged 79); Paris, France
- Employer: L'Oréal
- Organization(s): La Cagoule, LVF

Jacques Corrèze (11 February 1912 – 28 June 1991) was a French businessman and politician. He was the chief executive officer of the United States-based operation of L'Oréal for the Americas (Cosmair), the world's leading company in cosmetics and beauty products. He was the secretary of Eugène Deloncle.

== About ==
Corrèze was a member of La Cagoule, a violent fascist-leaning and anti-communist group. During its early period, Eugène Schueller, founder of L'Oréal, provided financial support and held meetings for La Cagoule at L'Oréal headquarters.

During the Second World War both Corrèze and Eugene Schueller, as well as many other L'Oréal executives, were very active supporters of the Vichy regime. When the Gestapo raided Deloncle's home, killed him and injured gravely his son Louis Deloncle, Corrèze was present but escaped. He later married Deloncle's widow, Mercedes Deloncle.

After the war Corrèze was convicted of a number of crimes, and sentenced to ten years in prison in France. He was released after serving five years and shortly thereafter became a senior executive at L'Oréal and Chairman of Cosmair, a private U.S. company and the sole licensee of L'Oreal in the United States.

Corrèze was in charge of negotiations with Arab governments to comply with the Arab League Bureau of Economic Boycott requests, after the Arab League began a boycott of L'Oréal when it was revealed that the group had acquired Helena Rubinstein Incorporated, a company with a manufacturing plant in Israel.

Corrèze was also under investigation by the Office of Special Investigations (United States Department of Justice) in 1991 for his active participation in antisemitic acts and for his membership of the anti-communist Légion des volontaires français. Correze resigned from L 'Oreal in 1991 as well, claiming that it was not due to his health. However, he was forced to leave the United States and died of pancreatic cancer a week later in Paris, aged 79. His wife died three years earlier.

== See also ==
- L'Oréal
- Eugène Schueller
- Liliane Bettencourt
- André Bettencourt
- La Cagoule
