= L'Oréal =

French multinational cosmetics and beauty company

L'Oréal S.A.

- L'Oréal headquarters in Clichy, France
- Type: Public
- Traded as: Euronext Paris: OR; CAC 40 component
- ISIN: FR0000120321
- Industry: Consumer goods
- Founded: 30 July 1909; 117 years ago
- Founder: Eugène Schueller
- Headquarters: Clichy, France
- Area served: Worldwide
- Key people: Jean-Paul Agon (chairman); Jean Victor Meyers (vice-chairman); Nicolas Hieronimus (CEO)
- Products: Cosmetics; skin care; perfume
- Revenue: ▲€44.05 billion (2025)
- Operating income: ▲€8.89 billion (2025)
- Net income: ▼€6.12 billion (2025)
- Total assets: ▲€61.82 billion (2025)
- Total equity: ▲€35.00 billion (2025)
- Number of employees: 90,000 (2024)
- Subsidiaries: AcneFree; Aesop; Ambi; Biotherm; CeraVe; Garnier; Helena Rubinstein Incorporated; Kiehl's; Lancôme; Matrix Essentials; Maybelline; NYX Cosmetics
- Website: loreal.com

L'Oréal S.A. (French: [lɔʁe.al]) is a French multinational personal care corporation registered in Paris and headquartered in Clichy, Hauts-de-Seine. As of 2024, it is the world's largest cosmetics company. As of the early 2020s, L'Oréal owned 36 brands and 497 patents.

== History ==
=== Founding ===
In the early 20th century, Eugène Paul Louis Schueller (1881–1957), a French chemist, developed a hair dye formula called l'Auréale. Schueller formulated and manufactured his own products, which he sold to Parisian hairdressers. On 31 July 1909, Schueller registered his company, the Société Française de Teintures Inoffensives pour Cheveux (Safe Hair Dye Company of France), which eventually became L'Oréal. In 1920, the company employed three chemists. Its workforce grew to 100 employees by 1950 and 1,000 by 1984. By 2021, L'Oréal employed an estimated 85,252 people worldwide.

After launching in the hair-colour business, L'Oréal branched out into other cleansing and beauty products. As of 2020, L'Oréal marketed in all sectors of the beauty business: hair colour, hair styling, body and skincare, cleansers, makeup, and fragrance.

=== Recent history and acquisitions ===
L'Oréal purchased Synthélabo, a pharmaceutical company, in 1973. Synthélabo merged with Sanofi in 1999 to become Sanofi-Synthélabo. Sanofi-Synthélabo merged with Aventis in 2004 to become Sanofi-Aventis.

Nestlé has owned a stake in L'Oréal since 1974, when it bought into the company at the request of Liliane Bettencourt, the daughter of the founder of L'Oréal.

In 1984, L'Oréal acquired part of Helena Rubinstein Incorporated from Albi International. The portions acquired were the Japanese and Latin American divisions of the company, along with overseeing the operations and the markets for those divisions. The joint venture partnership between L'Oréal and Albi International lasted until 1988, when L'Oréal brought the remainder of the company and has owned the entire company since then.

From 1988 to 1989, L'Oréal controlled the film company Paravision International, whose properties included the Filmation and De Laurentiis libraries. StudioCanal acquired the Paravision properties in 1994.

On 20 August 2002, L'Oréal announced that its wholly owned U.S. subsidiary, L'Oréal USA, had acquired ARTec Systems Group, Inc., a professional salon hair care and hair color company based in Port Washington, New York, for an undisclosed sum. Founded in 1990 by Leland Hirsch and Michael Mazzei, ARTec sold hair care, hair color and styling products under the Textureline, Purehair, Kiwi, Enamels and Spaline names through roughly 20,000 U.S. salons, and reported net sales to distributors of $38 million in the previous year. L'Oréal said the purchase was intended to broaden the L'Oréal Professionnel brand beyond hair color, which had accounted for the large majority of the division's U.S. sales. ARTec's Port Washington operations were merged into L'Oréal Professional's New York office, and both founders left their posts while remaining as contract consultants. The ARTec lines were subsequently absorbed into L'Oréal Professionnel and the standalone brand was retired.

On 17 March 2006, L'Oréal purchased cosmetics company The Body Shop for £562 million. In May 2008, L'Oréal acquired YSL Beauté for $1.8 billion.

In 2014, L'Oréal finalized the acquisition of major Chinese beauty brand Magic Holdings for $840 million. In February 2014, L'Oréal agreed to buy back 8% of its shares for €3.4bn from Nestlé. In February 2014, Shiseido agreed to sell its Carita and Decléor brands to L'Oréal for €227.5 million (US$312.93 million (2014)). In June 2014, L'Oréal agreed to acquire NYX Cosmetics for an undisclosed price, bolstering its makeup offerings in North America. Also that year, L'Oréal announced it had agreed to purchase Brazilian hair care company Niely Cosmeticos Group for an undisclosed amount. In September 2014, L'Oréal acquired the brand Carol's Daughter. In July 2016, L'Oréal agreed to acquire IT Cosmetics for $1.2 billion.

In 2017, Bettencourt died and left the business to her daughter, Françoise Bettencourt Meyers.

In 2018, L'Oréal acquired the beauty technology company ModiFace. In May 2018, L'Oréal announced a new beauty and fragrance partnership with Valentino. In December 2020, L'Oréal announced that it would acquire Takami Co, a Japanese skincare company.

In 2021, L'Oréal announced the acquisition of the vegan skincare brand Youth to the People.

In April 2023, L'Oréal purchased Australian luxury cosmetics brand Aesop for US$2.53 billion. In December 2023, L'Oréal announced its acquisition of the Danish research company Lactobio.

In 2024, L’Oréal announced its acquisition of Gjosa, a Swiss water conservation startup. In February 2024, L’Oréal announced its signing of a long-term global licensing agreement for the creation, development and distribution of luxury beauty products by the Italian brand Miu Miu.

In August 2024, L'Oréal opened a research and innovation center in India. In December 2024, L'Oréal expanded its portfolio by acquiring a stake in a leading Korean cosmetics company Gowoonsesang Cosmetics and its brand Dr.G from Swiss retailer Migros. In March 2025, L’Oréal sold hair care brand Carol's Daughter to an unnamed entrepreneur.

In June 2025, L'Oreal signed an agreement to acquire haircare brand Color Wow.

In October 2025, L'Oreal announced a deal to buy Kering's beauty business for approximately €4 billion. The deal includes cologne brand House of Creed and exclusive rights to develop fragrances and beauty products for Kering labels—including Gucci, Bottega Veneta and Balenciaga—for 50 years.

In August 2026, Priyanka Bhargav joined L'Oreal India as the head of consumer intelligence and brand strategy.

== Corporate affairs ==
=== Head office ===
L'Oréal Group has its head office in the Centre Eugène Schueller in Clichy, Hauts-de-Seine, close to Paris. The building, constructed in the 1970s from brick and steel, replaced the former Monsavon factory, and employees moved into the facility in 1978. 1,400 employees work in the building. In 2005, Nils Klawitter of Der Spiegel said "the building, with its brown glazed façade of windows, is every bit as ugly as its neighbourhood." Klawitter added that the facility "gives the impression of a high-security zone" due to the CCTV cameras and security equipment.

International units include:

- L'Oréal USA, changed from Cosmair in 2000 - has its headquarters in New York City, and is responsible for operations in the Americas.
- L'Oréal Canada Incorporated - Canadian operations, based in Montreal
- L'Oréal Australia - head office is in Melbourne
- L'Oréal Nordic - head office is in Copenhagen, Denmark
- L'ORÉAL Deutschland GmbH - legal seat is in Karlsruhe, head office is in Düsseldorf

=== Research and development facilities ===
L'Oréal has 21 worldwide research and development centers: three global centers in France: Aulnay, Chevilly and Saint-Ouen. Six regional poles include one in the United States: Clark, New Jersey; one in Japan: Kawasaki, Kanagawa Prefecture; in 2005, one was established in Shanghai, China, another in India: Mumbai, one other regional pole in Brazil: Rio de Janeiro and, lastly, another was established in South Africa: Johannesburg.

=== Corporate governance ===
Jean-Paul Agon is the chairman and Nicolas Hieronimus the chief executive officer of L'Oréal. Jean Victor Meyers and Paul Bulcke are vice chairmen of the board of directors.

=== Stockholders ===
As of 31 December 2023:

- Breakdown of share ownership: 34.73% by the Bettencourt family, 30.7% by international institutional investors, 20.13% by Nestlé, 6.63% by French institutional investors, 5.92% by individual shareholders, 1.89% by employees.

=== Business figures ===
Countries with L'Oréal products available

Financial data in € billions
Year	2013	2014	2015	2016	2017	2018	2019	2020	2021	2022	2023	2024	2025
Revenue	22.977	22.532	25.257	25.837	26.024	26.937	29.874	27.992	32.288	38.261	41.183	43.487	44.052
Net Income	2.958	4.910	3.297	3.106	3.586	3.895	3.750	3.563	4.597	5.707	6.184	6.409	6.127
Assets	31.298	32.063	33.711	35.630	35.339	38.458	43.810	43.607	43.013	46.844	51.855	56.353	61.821
Employees	77,452	78,611	82,881	89,331	82,606	86,030	87,974	85,392	85,412	87,264	94,605	94,397	94,610

=== Joint ventures and minority interests ===
L'Oréal holds 10.41% of the shares of Sanofi-Aventis, the world's number three and Europe's number one pharmaceutical company. The Laboratoires Innéov is a joint venture in nutritional cosmetics between L'Oréal and Nestlé; they draw on Nestlé's knowledge in the fields of nutrition and food safety.

== Brand portfolio ==
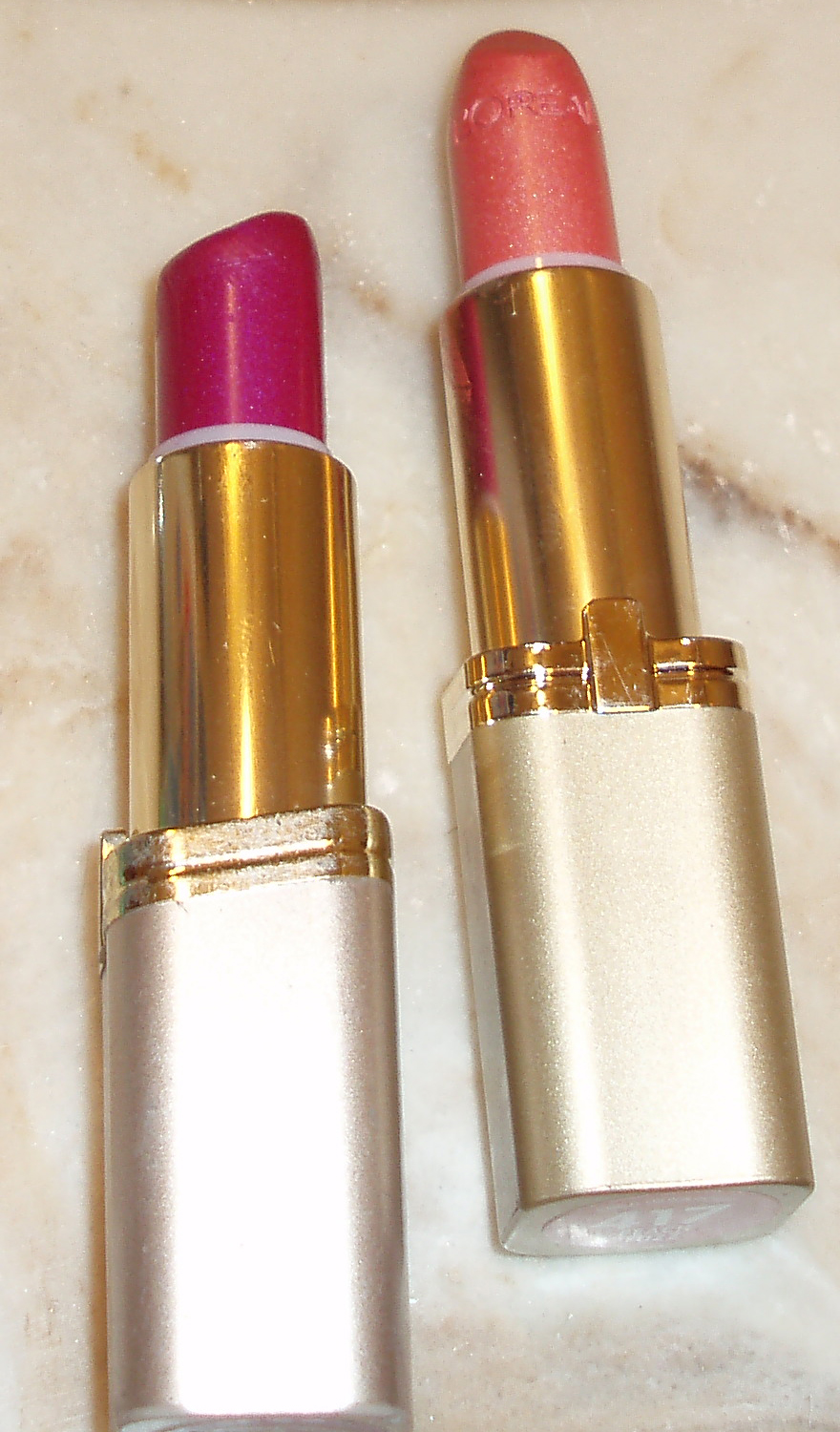
L'Oréal lipstick

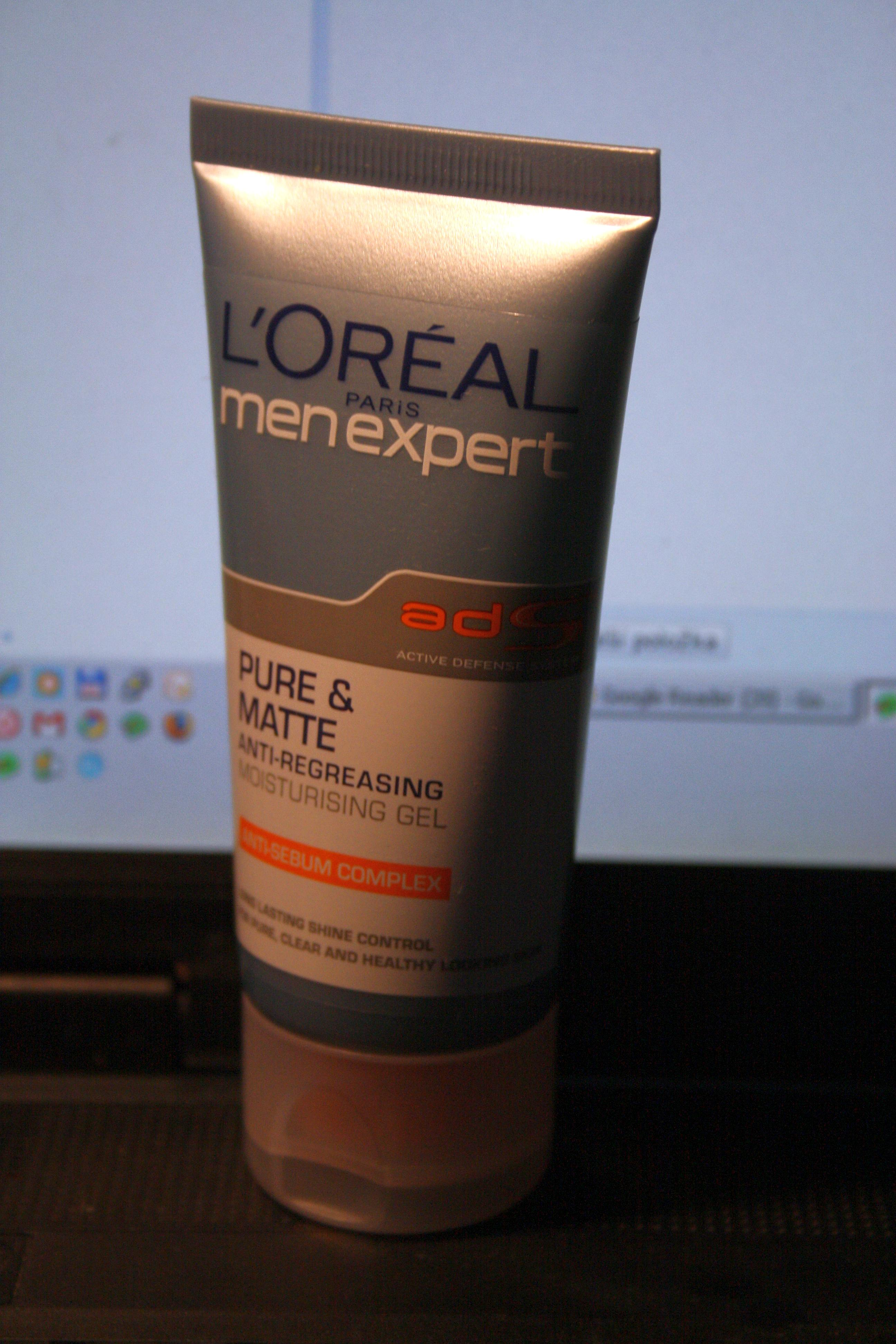
L'Oréal skincare product

Brands are generally categorized by their targeted markets, such as the mass, professional, luxurious, and active cosmetics markets. Galderma is directly attached to the head office. L'Oréal also owns interests in various activities such as fine chemicals, health, finance, design, advertising, and insurance.

In 2023, the World Intellectual Property Organization (WIPO)’s Madrid Yearly Review ranked L'Oréal's number of marks applications filled under the Madrid System as 1st in the world, with 199 trademarks applications submitted during 2023.

=== Consumer products division ===
- Dark and Lovely Professional Expertise
- Essie, founded in 1981 and acquired by L'Oreal in 2010
- Garnier
- La Provençale
- L'Oréal Paris
- Maybelline
- Mixa
- Niely Cosmetics
- NYX Professional Makeup
- Thayers Natural Remedies
- Vogue Cosmetics
- 3CE Makeup & Cosmetics

=== L'Oréal luxurious division ===
- Aesop
- Armani Beauty and Fragrances
- Atelier Cologne
- Azzaro
- Biotherm
- Cacharel Fragrances
- Carita
- Creed Fragrances
- Diesel Fragrances
- Helena Rubinstein Incorporated
- IT Cosmetics
- Jacquemus la Beauté
- Kering Beauty and Fragrances
- Kiehl's
- Lancôme
- Maison Margiela Paris Fragrances
- Medik8
- Miu Miu Fragrances
- MUGLER
- Prada
- Proenza Schouler
- Ralph Lauren Fragrances
- Shu Uemura Cosmetics
- Takami Labo
- Urban Decay
- Valentino Beauty
- Viktor & Rolf Fragrances
- Yue Sai Beauty
- Youth to the People
- Yves Saint Laurent Beauté

=== Professional products division ===
- Biolage Professional Hair Spa
- Carol's Daughter
- Kérastase (created by L'Oreal in 1964)
- L’Oréal Professionnel Paris
- Matrix Haircare
- Mizani
- PulpRiot Hair Coloring
- Pureology Serious Color Care
- Redken 5th Avenue NYC, founded by Paula Kent and Jheri Redding in 1960 and acquired by L'Oreal in 1993
- Shu Uemura Art of Hair

=== L’Oréal Dermatological Beauty ===
- AcneFree
- Ambi
- CeraVe (Owned by Bausch Health and sold to L'Oréal in 2017)
- Clarisonic
- Dermablend
- La Roche-Posay
- Logocos
- Sanoflore
- Skinbetter Science
- Skinceuticals Advanced Professional Skincare
- Vichy's Vichy cosmetics

== Marketing ==
In Kosovo, during the growth years of the mail-order business, L'Oréal and 3 Suisses founded Le Club des Créateurs de Beauté for mail-order sales of cosmetic products, with brands including Agnès b., Commence and Professeur Christine Poelman among others. In March 2008, L'Oréal acquired three Suisse's stake, taking sole control of the company. In November 2013, L'Oréal announced that Le Club des Créateurs de Beauté would cease activity in the first half of 2014.

Since 1997, L'Oréal has been an official partner of the Cannes Film Festival. In the years of L'Oréal sponsorship, many L'Oréal beauty ambassadors walked the red carpet of the festival. In 2017, L'Oréal beauty ambassadors, including Julianne Moore, Susan Sarandon, Andie MacDowell, and Eva Longoria, were responsible for the film selection for the outdoor cinema during the Cannes Film Festival.

L'Oréal's advertising slogan, "Because I'm worth it", was created in 1973 by 30-year-old McCann copywriter Ilon Specht for the Preference by L’Oréal hair color campaign and introduced by the model and actress Joanne Dusseau. In the mid-2000s, this was replaced by "Because you're worth it". In late-2009, the slogan was changed again to "Because we're worth it".

In 2012, L'Oréal inaugurated the largest factory in the Jababeka Industrial Park, Cikarang, Indonesia, with a total investment of US$100 million. The production will be absorbed 25 percent by the domestic market and the rest will be exported. In 2010, significant growth occurred in Indonesia with a 61 percent increase of unit sales or 28 percent of net sales.

In 2020, chief digital officer Lubomira Rochet reported in a video conference of the growing importance of e-commerce for the company, remarking that e-commerce makes 24% of its turnover in the third quarter of the year. Rochet stated as well that this 24% of the turnover "made it possible to offset 50% of the losses due to the closing of physical stores this year".

== Ambassadors ==
L'Oréal Paris has a group of ambassadors, artists, actresses, and activists referred to as the L'Oréal Paris "Dream Team".

- Laetitia Casta (1998–present)
- Beyoncé Knowles (2003-2013)
- Aishwarya Rai (2004–present)
- Eva Longoria (2005–present)
- Blake Lively (2013–present)
- Helen Mirren (2014–present)
- Luma Grothe (2015–present)
- Soo Joo (2015–present)
- Aja Naomi King (2017–present)
- Camila Cabello (2017–present)
- Elle Fanning (2017–present)
- Amber Heard (2018-2023)
- Andie MacDowell (2018–present)
- Duckie Thot (2018–present)
- Jaha Dukureh (2018–present)
- Céline Dion (2019–present)
- Cindy Bruna (2020–present)
- Viola Davis (2021–present)
- Kate Winslet (2021–present)
- Yseult (2021–present)
- H.E.R. (2022–present)
- Anushka Sharma (2022–present)
- Thuso Mbedu (2023–present)
- Kendall Jenner (2023–present)
- Cody Simpson (2023–present)
- Mary Fowler (2024–present)
- Simone Ashley (2024–present)
- Temi Otedola (2024–present)
- Alia Bhatt (2024–present)

== Controversies ==
=== Involvement in fascism by L'Oréal key figures ===
L'Oréal has conceded that its founder, Eugène Schueller, was a Nazi sympathizer and antisemitic fascist. He was also a member of La Cagoule, a violent, pro-fascist and anti-communist organisation. During the occupation of France in World War II, Its founder formed Mouvement Social Révolutionnaire (MSR, Social Revolutionary Movement), a political party which collaborated with the Vichy government. Schueller provided financial support for La Cagoule, and allowed some of the group's meetings to be held at L'Oréal headquarters. La Cagoule perpetrated crimes including firearms transportation, assassinating a former minister, and firebombing six synagogues. L'Oréal hired several members of the group as executives after World War II, such as Jacques Corrèze, who served as CEO of the United States operation.

Another controversy arose after Jean Frydman, a shareholder and board member of Paravision, a film subsidiary of L'Oréal, was fired. He claims that he was let go because L'Oréal wanted to avoid an Arab boycott of businesses associated with Jews. In turn, Frydman decided to expose the past of L'Oréal executives. André Bettencourt who married Schueller's daughter, Liliane Bettencourt, and became deputy chairman for L'Oréal, wrote 60 articles for La Terre Française, an antisemitic Nazi propaganda sheet. André has admitted ownership of the propaganda but claimed he was poisoned by the Vichy regime and said, "I have repeatedly expressed my regrets concerning them in public and will always beg the Jewish community to forgive me for them." André Bettencourt also sheltered Schueller and several collaborators from the French Resistance after Liberation. It was also revealed that Eugène Schueller hired Jacques Correze, who was the honorary head of L'Oréal's U.S. affiliate, Cosmair, and was involved with La Cagoule.

Further controversy arose when it was revealed that L'Oréal had its German headquarters for over 30 years, before being sold in 1991, on land confiscated from a Jewish family during World War II. The Jewish family has been battling for restitution from the company for three generations, the latest of which is Edith Rosenfelder, a Holocaust survivor. Fritz Rosenfelder was forced to sell the house to a Nazi official, of which the family never received the proceeds of the sale. Instead, the family was deported. The Allies passed Jewish restitution legislation which states that transactions with Nazis, even if appearing to be with the owner's consent, can be considered invalid. As the land was sold to an offshoot of L'Oréal, which was later bought out in 1961 by L'Oréal, the company claims that it is not responsible for anything that happened before then. The basis for Rosenfelder's argument is that since the original sale was illegal, all subsequent sales are equally unlawful. There was restitution paid in 1951 to the Jewish Restitution Successor Organization, though this was done without the family's consent and none of the money ever reached the family. A book by Monica Waitzfelder, daughter of Edith Rosenfelder, published in French as L'Oréal a pris ma maison and in English as L'Oréal stole my house!, details how L'Oréal took over the Waitzfelder home in the German city of Karlsruhe (after the Nazis had engineered the removal of the family) to make it its German headquarters. Monica Waitzfelder is quoted as saying, "All the other businesses which took Jewish property have since returned it, without any great debate. I don't understand why L'Oréal should be any different from the others." A case was brought before the Supreme Court in France, but the public prosecutor ruled that there could be no trial. As of 2007, she is bringing the case to the European Court of Human Rights.

=== Garnier boycott ===
On 31 July 2014 during Operation Protective Edge launched by the Israel Defense Forces (IDF) in the Gaza Strip, the Israel advocacy organisation StandWithUs posted several Facebook photos of care packages, which they said were donated by Garnier Israel to female IDF soldiers. This sparked several calls to boycott Garnier and L'Oréal worldwide. Garnier disavowed the giveaway and stated on its Facebook page, “Garnier USA is aware of recent activity in social media. It is very important to us that our fans know that Garnier worldwide promotes peace and harmony and has a strict policy of not getting involved in any conflict or political matter. Garnier was astonished to discover this in social media. After investigation, the hand-out of about 500 products appeared to be part of a one-time local retailer initiative. Garnier disapproves of this initiative managed strictly at local level and is very sorry to have offended some of its fans.”

=== Animal testing ===
L'Oréal began in vitro tissue testing in 1979, and does not test any of its products or ingredients on animals anywhere in the world since 1989–14 years before it was required by regulation. Controversy came from the fact that L'Oréal sells products in China, whose regulators conduct animal testing on cosmetics to be sold within its territory. Even though a ban on animal testing in China came into effect in January 2020, Chinese authorities still perform this practice for imported "ordinary" cosmetics.

Following L'Oréal's 2006 purchase of The Body Shop, which does not support animal testing, The Body Shop's founder Anita Roddick was forced to defend herself against allegations of "abandoning her principles" over L'Oréal's involvement on animal testing. Calls were made for shoppers to boycott The Body Shop. L'Oréal sold The Body Shop to Brazilian group Natura Cosméticos in 2017.

=== Racist discrimination lawsuits ===
On 11 August 2005, the Supreme Court of California ruled that former L'Oréal sales manager Elyse Yanowitz had adequately pleaded a cause of action for retaliatory termination under the California Fair Employment and Housing Act, and remanded the case for trial. The case arose out of a 1997 incident in which Jack Wiswall, then the general manager for designer fragrances, allegedly told Yanowitz to fire a dark-skinned sales associate despite the associate's good performance. When Yanowitz refused, Wiswall pointed to a "sexy" blonde-haired woman and said, "God damn it, get me one that looks like that." Wiswall retired as president of the luxury products division of L'Oréal USA at the end of 2006.

The company faced discrimination lawsuits in France related to the hiring of spokesmodels and institutional racism. In 2007, the Garnier division and an external employment agency were fined €30,000 for recruitment practices that intentionally excluded women of colour from promoting its hair wash, "Fructis Style".

L'Oréal continues to sell skin whitening products, which have been criticised as "capitalising on women's insecurities due to colourism." They advertise these controversial products, which have been criticised for promoting a colonial attitude as well as having safety concerns, on its website by claiming; "Achieve clear, translucent and radiant skin. Our skin whitening products work to fade dark spots and brighten skin to give you the fair, flawless complexion you desire."

=== False advertising ===
In May 2007, L'Oréal was one of several cosmetic manufacturers (along with Clinique, Estee Lauder, Payot, Lancôme) ordered by the Therapeutic Goods Administration in Australia to withdraw advertising regarding the wrinkle removal capabilities of its products.

In the UK, L'Oréal has faced criticism from OFCOM regarding the truth of its advertising and marketing campaigns concerning the product performance of one of its mascara brands. In July 2007, the British Advertising Standards Authority attacked L'Oréal for a television advert on its "Telescopic" mascara, featuring Penélope Cruz, stating, "it will make your eyelashes 60% longer." In fact, it only made the lashes look 60% bigger, by separating and thickening at the roots and by thickening the tips of the lashes. They also failed to state that the model was wearing false eyelashes.

In July 2011, the British Advertising Standards Authority took action against L'Oréal, banning two airbrushed Lancôme advertisements in the UK featuring actress Julia Roberts and supermodel Christy Turlington. The agency issued the ban after British politician Jo Swinson argued that the two ads misrepresented reality and added to the self-image problem amongst females in the UK. L'Oréal acknowledged that the photos had been airbrushed but argued that the two cosmetic products could actually produce the results depicted in the ads and that the results of the products had been scientifically proven.

In June 2014, the company reached an agreement with the U.S. Federal Trade Commission not to make claims about its anti-aging products unless it had credible scientific evidence supporting the claims. The settlement followed an investigation by the commission into claims being made in relation to two products, which the commission described as "false and unsubstantiated".

L'Oréal has a team of 400 members of staff who post content to Facebook every day, according to Marc Menesguen, the company's chief marketing officer.

=== Patent lawsuit ===
In July 2017, the University of Massachusetts Medical filed a patent lawsuit against L'Oréal. In August 2017, Dennis Wyrzykowski and his company, Carmel Laboratories LLC, joined the lawsuit. The two parties claimed that L'Oréal's brands used UMass' patented technology for skin creams with the chemical adenosine. In 2021, a judge found the patents invalid. In 2022, the U.S. Appeals Court reversed the decision, stating that UMass could continue to purse its lawsuit.

=== Corporate misconduct ===
L'Oréal was fined by Autorité de la concurrence in France in 2016 for price-fixing on personal hygiene products.

=== Munroe Bergdorf ===
In August 2017, L'Oréal dismissed Munroe Bergdorf, a mixed-race transgender model, after she responded to the Unite the Right rally in Charlottesville, Virginia, by stating in a Facebook post: "Honestly I don't have the energy to talk about the racial violence of white people any more. Yes ALL white people"; the post was also quoted as saying that "[white people's] existence, privilege and success as a race is built on the backs, blood and death of people of colour", "racism isn't learned, it's inherited and ... passed down through privilege" and that "white people" ought to "begin to admit that their race is the most violent and oppressive force of nature on Earth". Shortly after terminating Bergdorf, L'Oréal released a statement claiming its commitment to "[support] diversity and tolerance towards all people irrespective of their race, background, gender and religion" and had terminated its partnership with Bergdorf because her comments were "at odds with those values".

=== Amber Heard ===
In 2018, L'Oréal Paris hired Amber Heard as a Global Ambassador, also giving a special tribute to her. In 2020, after a tape leaked of Heard admitting to having hit her ex-husband Johnny Depp in retaliation to his abuse, several petitions were filed requesting L'Oreal to fire her. As of June 2021, L'Oreal continued to include Heard among a team of "ambassadors" that also includes Kate Winslet, Jane Fonda, Elle Fanning, and French singer-songwriter Yseult. Heard was being sued in a defamation trial by Depp in which he accused her of defamation for identifying herself as a victim of domestic abuse (without naming Depp).

=== Child labour ===
In May 2024, a BBC World Service documentary titled "Perfume's Dark Secret" uncovered widespread child labor in Egypt's jasmine fields, an essential source for fragrances used by major beauty brands, including L'Oréal. The investigation exposed that children, some as young as five years old, were engaged in the physically demanding task of picking jasmine flowers. These children worked under grueling conditions, often beginning their shifts at 3 a.m. and working in high temperatures. The documentary highlighted the poverty these children faced, with some earning as little as $1 per day, far below a living wage.

The BBC's findings sparked global concern over labor practices in the perfume industry, particularly regarding the exploitation of children in rural areas of Egypt. The country's jasmine flowers are a key ingredient in high-end perfumes produced by companies like L'Oréal, leading to questions about the ethical sourcing of raw materials in the beauty and fragrance sector. Despite claims by L'Oréal and other luxury brands of strict monitoring systems, the documentary suggested that these children had been overlooked by current auditing processes and that insufficient measures were in place to protect workers from exploitation.

=== nkd lawsuit ===
L'Oréal has been in a three-year trademark dispute with a small British hair-removal aftercare company called nkd on the grounds that its name might cause "customer confusion" with the L'Oréal "Naked" line of eyeshadow palettes and other make-up products. The nkd name was created in 2009, one year before the launch of the "Naked" line in the UK. According to Rebecca Dowdeswell, the owner of nkd, "The two brand names are spelt and pronounced differently, so I’ve always been pronounced 'n-k-d', they’ve always been 'naked'." Dowdeswell's trademark for nkd expired in 2019, but because of the COVID-19 pandemic she forgot to renew it until 2022, a failure for which she readily admits responsibility. To date nkd has spent over £30,000 on legal fees and has had to shut down one of its two salons in its struggle with the £170 billion company.

== See also ==
- Trademark#Top Madrid Trademark Applicants
