= Eugène Schueller =

French pharmacist and entrepreneur, founder of L'Oréal (1881–1957)

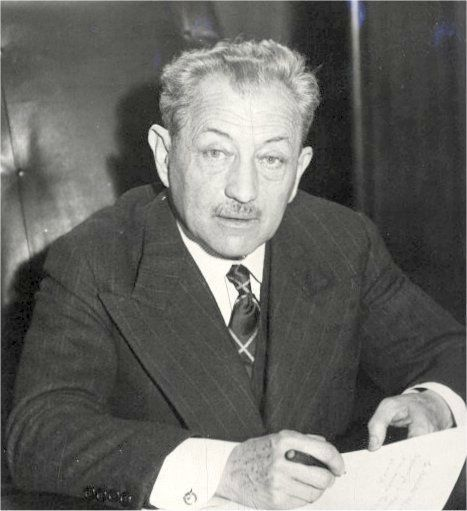
- Born: Eugène Paul Louis Schueller; 20 March 1881; Paris, France
- Died: 23 August 1957 (aged 76); Paris, France
- Education: Chimie ParisTech
- Occupations: Chemist and entrepreneur
- Known for: Founding L'Oréal
- Children: Liliane Bettencourt

Eugène Paul Louis Schueller (20 March 1881 – 23 August 1957) was a French chemist and entrepreneur who was the founder of L'Oréal, a leading company in cosmetics and beauty.

== Founding of L'Oréal ==
Schueller was of Alsatian origin. He graduated in 1904 from the Institut de Chimie Appliquée de Paris (now Chimie ParisTech) and became a laboratory assistant under Victor Auger (father of Pierre Victor Auger) at Sorbonne. A barber asked him to develop a new hair dye, but Schueller took this opportunity to lead his own research shop.

Schueller developed an innovative hair-color formula in 1907, which he called Oréale. He formulated and manufactured his own products, and sold them to Parisian hairdressers.

In 1909, he registered his company, the Société Française de Teintures Inoffensives pour Cheveux (French Company of Inoffensive Hair Dyes), the future L'Oréal. In his production unit, he developed the concept of proportional salary. In 1936, the social reforms led by Léon Blum in France suddenly created a vacation industry, and the sales of L'Oréal's sunscreen (Ambre Solaire) skyrocketed.

== Support for fascism ==
During the early twentieth century, Schueller provided financial support and held meetings for La Cagoule at L'Oréal headquarters. La Cagoule was a violent French fascist-leaning, antisemitic and anti-communist group whose leader formed a political party Mouvement Social Révolutionnaire (MSR, Social Revolutionary Movement) which in Occupied France supported the Vichy collaboration with the conquerors from Nazi Germany.

In La révolution de l’économie (1941), he wrote:

I know full well that we don't have the chance that the Nazis did, coming to power in 1933... We don't have the gift that the Germans had…We don't have the faith of national-socialism. We don't have the dynamism of a Hitler pushing the world.

L'Oréal hired several members of the group as executives after World War II, such as Jacques Corrèze, who was CEO of the US operation. This involvement was extensively researched by Michael Bar-Zohar in his book Bitter Scent.

== Family ==
Schueller's daughter, Liliane Bettencourt, was the widow of André Bettencourt, with whom she had one daughter, Françoise Bettencourt Meyers, chairwoman of L'Oréal's board of directors and, according to Bloomberg Billionaires Index, the richest woman in the world and the 12th richest person, with a net worth of US$ 94.9 billion as of January 2022. Françoise Meyers is married to Jean-Pierre Meyers, whose rabbi grandfather was murdered in Auschwitz. In 2017, Liliane Bettencourt was the wealthiest woman in the world, with holdings estimated at $39.5 billion.

== Legacy ==
The head office of L'Oréal in Clichy, Hauts-de-Seine is named Centre Eugène Schueller.
