= Liliane Bettencourt =

French heiress, socialite and businesswoman (1922–2017)

- Born: Liliane Henriette Charlotte Schueller; 21 October 1922; Paris, France
- Died: 21 September 2017 (aged 94); Neuilly-sur-Seine, France
- Occupations: Board member and principal shareholder of L'Oréal
- Spouse: André Bettencourt (m. 1950; died 2007)
- Children: Françoise Bettencourt Meyers
- Parent(s): Eugène Schueller; Louise Doncieux

Liliane Henriette Charlotte Bettencourt (French: [liljan ɑ̃ʁjɛt ʃaʁlɔt bɛtɑ̃kuʁ]; née Schueller; 21 October 1922 – 21 September 2017) was a French heiress, socialite and businesswoman. She was a board member and one of the principal shareholders of L'Oréal. At the time of her death, she was the richest woman in the world, and the 14th richest person in the world, with a net worth of US$44.3 billion.

== Biography ==
She was born Liliane Henriette Charlotte Schueller on 21 October 1922 in Paris, the only child of Louise Madeleine Berthe (née Doncieux) and Eugène Schueller, the founder of L'Oréal, one of the world's largest cosmetics and beauty companies. When Liliane was five years old, her mother died, and she formed a close bond with her father, who later married Liliane's British governess. At the age of 15, she joined her father's company as an apprentice, mixing cosmetics and labelling bottles of shampoo.

In 1950, she married French politician André Bettencourt, who served as a cabinet minister in French governments of the 1960s and 1970s and rose to become deputy chairman of L'Oréal. Mr. Bettencourt had been a member of La Cagoule, a violent French fascist pro-Nazi group that Liliane's father, a Nazi sympathizer, had funded and supported in the 1930s and whose members were arrested in 1937. After the war, her husband, like other members of La Cagoule, was given refuge at L'Oréal despite his politically inconvenient past. Eventually, the Bettencourts settled in a mansion built in 1951 and furnished in the Art Deco style on rue de Delabordère in Neuilly-sur-Seine, France. They had one daughter, Françoise, who was born in 1953.

In 1957, Bettencourt inherited the L'Oréal fortune when her father died, becoming the principal shareholder. In 1963, the company went public, although Bettencourt continued to own a majority stake. In 1974, in fear that the company would be nationalised after the French elections, she exchanged almost half of her stake for a three percent (3%) stake in Nestlé S.A.

As of December 2012, Bettencourt owned 185,661,879 (30.5%) of the outstanding shares of L'Oréal, of which 76,441,389 (12.56%) shares were effectively held in trust (for her daughter). The remainder were owned as follows: 178,381,021 (29.78%) shares owned by Nestlé, 229,933,941 (37.76%) shares were publicly held, and the remainder were held as treasury stock or in the company savings plan. The Bettencourt family and Nestlé acted in concert pursuant to a shareholders' agreement. Bettencourt ended her board director tenure on 13 February 2012 and her grandson, Jean-Victor, was appointed as board director. Bettencourt's daughter and her daughter's husband (Jean-Pierre Meyers) are also members of the board of directors.

Bettencourt generally shunned media attention and granted few interviews. From 2007, she faced intense media scrutiny and publicity over her relationship with François-Marie Banier, the estrangement with her daughter Françoise and her alleged funding of conservative French politicians, including former French president Nicolas Sarkozy. In August 2012, she sold her private island, D'Arros Island, to a Seychelles-registered conservation business linked to the Swiss Save our Seas Foundation, for £60 million. In April 2013, Forbes magazine listed Bettencourt as the world's richest woman in 1999, with a fortune valued at $30 billion.

Bettencourt had an art collection that was said to include Matisse, Picasso, Fernand Léger, Derain, Soutine, Mondrian and Ruhlmann furniture.

Bettencourt died on 21 September 2017. The funeral service was held at Église Saint-Pierre in Neuilly-sur-Seine.

== "L'affaire Bettencourt" ==
By most accounts, Bettencourt met François-Marie Banier, a French writer, artist and celebrity photographer, in 1987 when he was commissioned to photograph her for the French magazine Egoïste. Over the ensuing years, Banier and Bettencourt became friends and she became his benefactor, bestowing gifts upon him estimated to be worth as much as €1.3 billion. These gifts include, amongst other things, a life insurance policy worth €253 million in 2003, another life insurance policy worth €262 million in 2006, 11 works of art in 2001 valued at €20 million, including paintings by Picasso, Matisse, Mondrian, Delaunay and Léger, a photograph by surrealist Man Ray, and cash. The life insurance policies were allegedly signed over to Banier after Bettencourt was recovering from two hospital stays in 2003 and 2006.

In December 2007, just a month after the death of her father, Françoise Bettencourt Meyers lodged a criminal complaint against Banier, accusing him of abus de faiblesse (or the exploitation of a physical or psychological weakness for personal gain) over Bettencourt. As a result of her complaint, the Brigade Financière, the financial investigative arm of the French national police, opened an investigation and, after interviewing members of Bettencourt's staff, determined to present the case to a court in Nanterre for trial in September 2009. In December 2009, the court delayed ruling on the case until April 2010 (later extended until July 2010) pending the results of a medical examination of Bettencourt's mental state. However, Bettencourt refused to submit to these examinations.

In July 2010, the trial was adjourned again until autumn 2010, at the earliest, after details of tape recordings made by Bettencourt's butler, Pascal Bonnefoy, became public. The tapes, which were turned over to police, consisted of over 21 hours of conversation and were made because the butler had feared that Bettencourt was suffering from Alzheimer's disease and was being duped. The tapes allegedly reveal that Bettencourt had made Banier her "sole heir", excluding the L'Oréal shares which made up the bulk of Bettencourt's estate and which had already been signed over to her daughter and two grandsons.

On 6 December 2010, Bettencourt reconciled with her daughter, ending a series of lawsuits. It is reported that Bettencourt and Banier had separated, and he was eventually written out of Bettencourt's will. The spat reignited over the following summer, however, when Bettencourt said her daughter needed to seek psychological help, which renewed their estrangement.

=== Political scandal ===
In June 2010, Bettencourt became embroiled in a high-level French political scandal after other details of the tape recordings made by her butler became public. The tapes allegedly picked up conversations between Bettencourt and her financial adviser, Patrice de Maistre, which indicated that Bettencourt may have avoided paying taxes by keeping a substantial amount of cash in undeclared Swiss bank accounts. The tapes also allegedly recorded a conversation between Bettencourt and French budget minister Éric Woerth, who was soliciting a job for his wife managing Bettencourt's wealth, while running a high-profile campaign to catch wealthy tax evaders as the budget minister. Moreover, Bettencourt received a €30 million tax rebate while Woerth was budget minister.

In July 2010, the scandal widened after Bettencourt's former accountant, Claire Thibout, alleged in an interview with the French investigative website Mediapart, that conservative French politicians were frequently given envelopes stuffed with cash at Bettencourt's mansion in Neuilly-sur-Seine. She alleged that Woerth, while acting as treasurer for the Union for a Popular Movement (UMP), was given an envelope containing €150,000 in cash in March 2007 towards the presidential campaign of Nicolas Sarkozy. She also made, then retracted, a claim that Sarkozy was a frequent visitor to the Bettencourt's home while he was mayor of Neuilly-sur-Seine from 1983 to 2002 and received envelopes containing cash. A few days later, she declared she had been pressured by French police to retract her testimony about Sarkozy's illegal cash. Sarkozy and Woerth both denied wrongdoing. Following these allegations, French police raided the home and office of de Maistre, who heads Clymène, the company owned by Bettencourt to manage her wealth. French law limits political donations to €7,500 for political parties and €4,600 for individuals. Contributions above €150 must be paid by cheque with the donor clearly identified.

=== Guardianship ===
On 8 June 2011, it was reported that Bettencourt Meyers filed an application with the court to make Bettencourt a ward of the state for her health and being incapable of the management of her fortune. On 17 October 2011, a French judge ruled that she was to be placed under the guardianship of members of her family on concerns about Bettencourt's declining mental health. Bettencourt Meyers, along with Bettencourt's two grandsons, gained control of her wealth and property. One of the grandsons was additionally named as her personal guardian. Bettencourt's lawyer said he would appeal, and told Le Monde newspaper that "Mrs. Bettencourt was ready for 'nuclear war' with her daughter." As of 2014, Bettencourt Meyers was guardian of the fortune, while her son, L’Oréal Board member and member of the supervisory board of the Bettencourt family holding company, Tethys, Jean-Victor Meyers oversaw her health and personal life after a judge determined he was the only person able to "ward off all conflict between Liliane Bettencourt and Françoise Bettencourt-Meyers."

== Philanthropy ==
In 1987, Bettencourt, together with her husband and daughter, founded the Bettencourt Schueller Foundation (la Fondation Bettencourt Schueller) to support and develop medical, cultural and humanitarian projects. The foundation is based in Neuilly-sur-Seine. The foundation, which benefits from assets of €150 million and an annual budget of approx €15 million devotes approximately 55% of its funds to scientific education and research, 33% to humanitarian and social projects and 12% to culture and arts.

In 2008, the foundation helped fund the new Monet wing at the Musée Marmottan Monet. Through the foundation, Bettencourt established the Liliane Bettencourt Prize for Life Sciences in 1997, an annual award recognising outstanding contributions by early-career researchers in biology and biomedical science in Europe.

Conversely, in 2007 Bettencourt was jointly "awarded" a Black Planet Award, an award given for destroying the planet, along with Peter Brabeck-Letmathe for proliferating contaminated baby food, monopolising water resources, and tolerating child labour.

== Madoff victim ==
Bettencourt was reported to be one of the most high-profile victims of Bernard Madoff's Ponzi scheme, losing €22 million. She was the first investor in a fund managed by Access International Advisors, which was co-founded by René-Thierry Magon de la Villehuchet. De la Villehuchet died by suicide on 22 December 2008, after it became known that his funds had invested a substantial amount of their capital with Madoff.

== Forbes' rankings ==
Forbes ranked Bettencourt in its list of the world's wealthiest persons with an estimated fortune of US$38.8 billion (as of 28 June 2016). As of 2016, she was the top female billionaire in the world, and was also the richest person in France.

In 2005, Forbes judged her to be the 39th most powerful woman in the world.

== In popular culture ==
The 2025 movie The Richest Woman in the World was loosely based on the Bettencourt affair.

== Honors and awards ==
Knight of the Order of Legion of Honour
