= List of Bucknell University alumni =

This list of Bucknell University alumni includes graduates and former students of Bucknell University.

== Academia ==
- Peter Balakian, author and poet, Donald M. and Constance H. Rebar Professor of Humanities at Colgate University, winner of the 2016 Pulitzer Prize for Poetry
- Samuel Zane Batten, professor at the University of Pennsylvania School of Social Policy and Practice
- Carl Bennett, statistician and research assistant at Princeton University
- P. George Benson, twenty-first president of the College of Charleston
- Edward McNight Brawley, first African-American graduate, co-founder and president of Selma University and Morris College
- Charles E. Bunnell, first president of the University of Alaska
- Steven T. DeKosky, dean of the University of Virginia School of Medicine
- Dennis A. Dougherty, George Grant Hoag Professor of Chemistry at California Institute of Technology
- Murray Edelman, professor of Political Science at the University of Wisconsin-Madison
- Frank A. Golder (1877–1929), historian of Russian and a key builder of the Hoover War Library
- Mary W.M. Hargreaves, author, professor of history at the University of Kentucky, and associate editor/co-editor of The Papers of Henry Clay, volumes I through VI (Kentucky, 1959–1981)
- Marc Hauser, author, professor, and director of the Cognitive Evolution Lab at Harvard University
- David Jayne Hill, second president of the University of Rochester
- Ronald D. Liebowitz, ninth president of Brandeis University, sixteenth president of Middlebury College
- Marty Makary, Mark Ravitch Chair in Gastrointestinal Surgery at Johns Hopkins School of Medicine and professor of Surgery and Public Health at Johns Hopkins Bloomberg School of Public Health
- David Nasaw, author, historian, and Pulitzer Prize finalist. Arthur M. Schlesinger Jr. Distinguished Professor of History, City University of New York
- Douglas Noll, bioengineer, Ann and Robert H. Lurie Professor of Bioengineering at University of Michigan
- George Morris Philips, principal of West Chester University 1881–1920
- Robert A. Scott, ninth president of Adelphi University
- Amos Smith, Rhodes-Thompson Professor of Chemistry at the University of Pennsylvania
- Bruce Smith, professor of English at Syracuse University
- John Stasko, Regents Professor of Interactive Computing at Georgia Tech
- J.D. Trout, Calamos Professor of Philosophy at Illinois Institute of Technology
- Barbara F. Walter, Rohr Professor of International Affairs at the University of California, San Diego, member of Council on Foreign Relations

== Business ==
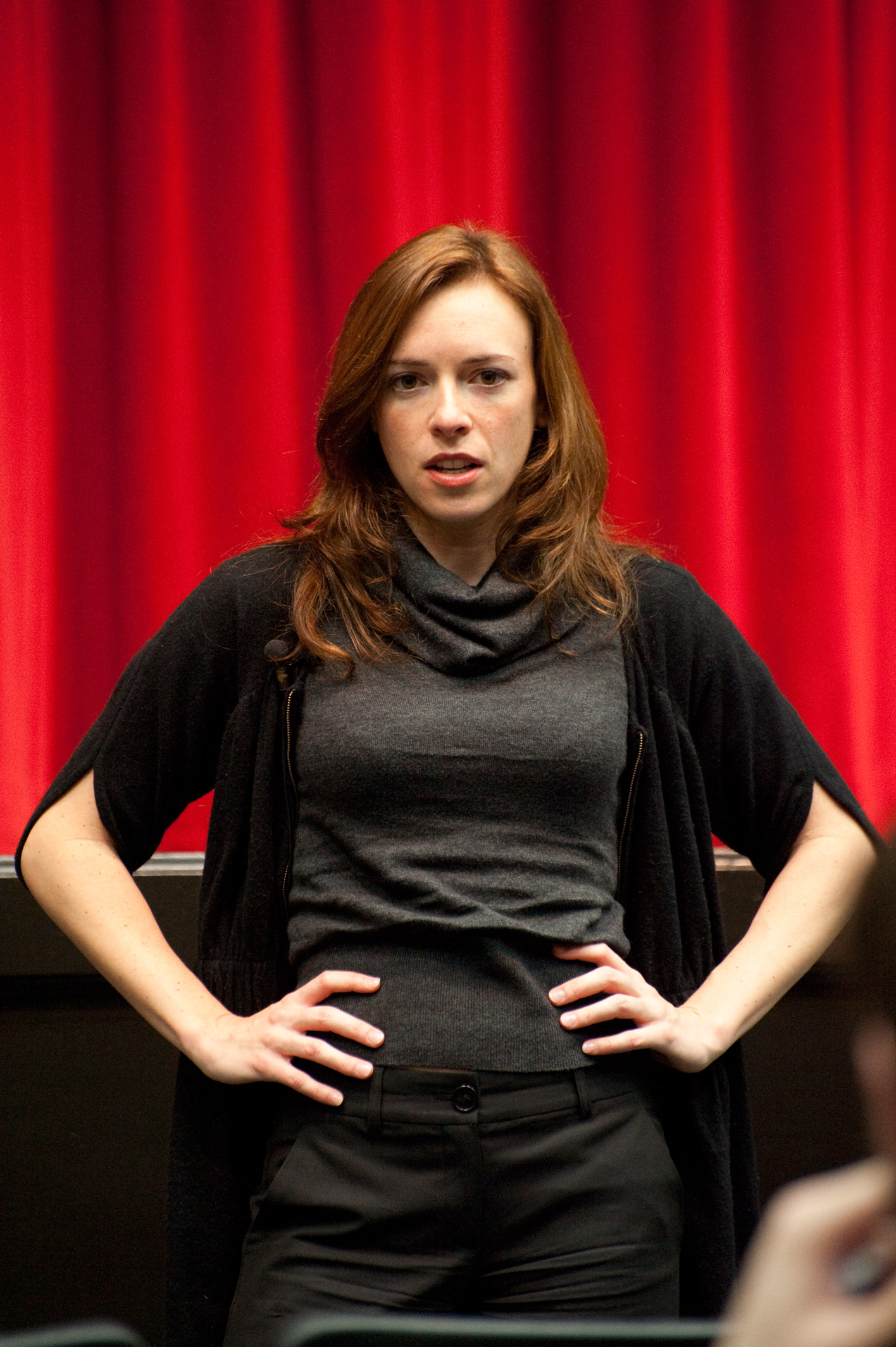
Jessica Jackley

- Ted Ammon, New York financier
- Kunitake Andō, president and group chief operating officer of Sony Corporation
- Ronald S. Baron, New York financier, founder of Baron Funds
- Charles Brandes, founder, Brandes Investment Partners
- Todd G. Buchholz, economist, investment manager, author, lecturer, and former White House director of economic policy; awarded the Allyn Young Teaching Prize by the Harvard University Department of Economics
- Jane T. Elfers, CEO of The Children's Place, former CEO of Lord & Taylor
- Jessica Jackley, co-founder of Kiva.org
- Richard Johnson, founder of hotjobs.com
- Kenneth Langone, helped secure capital for co-founders of Home Depot, and former director of the New York Stock Exchange
- Doug Lebda, founder & CEO of LendingTree
- Jessica Livingston, co-founder of YCombinator
- Marc Lore, president and CEO of Walmart Ecommerce; founder & CEO of Jet.com
- Takeo Shiina, president of IBM Japan, and vice-president of IBM
- Greg Skibiski, founder, former CEO & Chairman of Sense Networks
- Trisha Torrey, entrepreneur, author, and founder and director of AdvoConnection and the Alliance of Professional Health Advocates
- David Wood, leader of the Dell computer take-back campaign
- George Young, general manager of the New York Giants (1979–1997), named NFL Executive of the Year five times

== Entertainment ==
=== Film and television ===
- Gbenga Akinnagbe, actor; plays Chris Partlow on HBO's The Wire
- Chris Bender, co-produced movies such as the American Pie series, The Hangover, and others
- John Bolger, actor
- William Bramley, actor
- Edward Herrmann, actor
- Evan Coyne Maloney, webmaster/documentary filmmaker
- Robert Mandel, film director and producer, dean of the AFI Conservatory
- Les Moonves, former CBS chairman and CEO
- Nyambi Nyambi, actor; plays Samuel on Mike & Molly
- J.C. Spink, Hollywood talent manager and executive producer of The Hangover franchise
- Ralph Waite, actor
- Bill Westenhofer, winner of the Academy Award for Best Visual Effects in 2008 (The Golden Compass) and 2013 (Life of Pi)

=== Music ===
- Paul Althouse, opera singer
- Bill Challis, pioneering jazz arranger (Jean Goldkette, Paul Whiteman, Bix Beiderbecke)
- Kristen Henderson, founder, guitarist and songwriter of Antigone Rising, co-author of Times Two: Two Women in Love and The Happy Family They Made (Simon & Schuster, 2011), named to Buzzfeed's Most Powerful LGBT Icons and Allies List
- Bruce Lundvall, president and CEO of The Blue Note Label Group, including Blue Note Records
- Martin Rubeo, musician and founder of alternative rock band Gramsci Melodic

=== Other ===
- Billy McFarland, convicted fraudster and founder of Fyre Festival;ttended for one semester
- John McPherson, Close to Home cartoonist
- Garrett Neff, fashion model

== Government ==
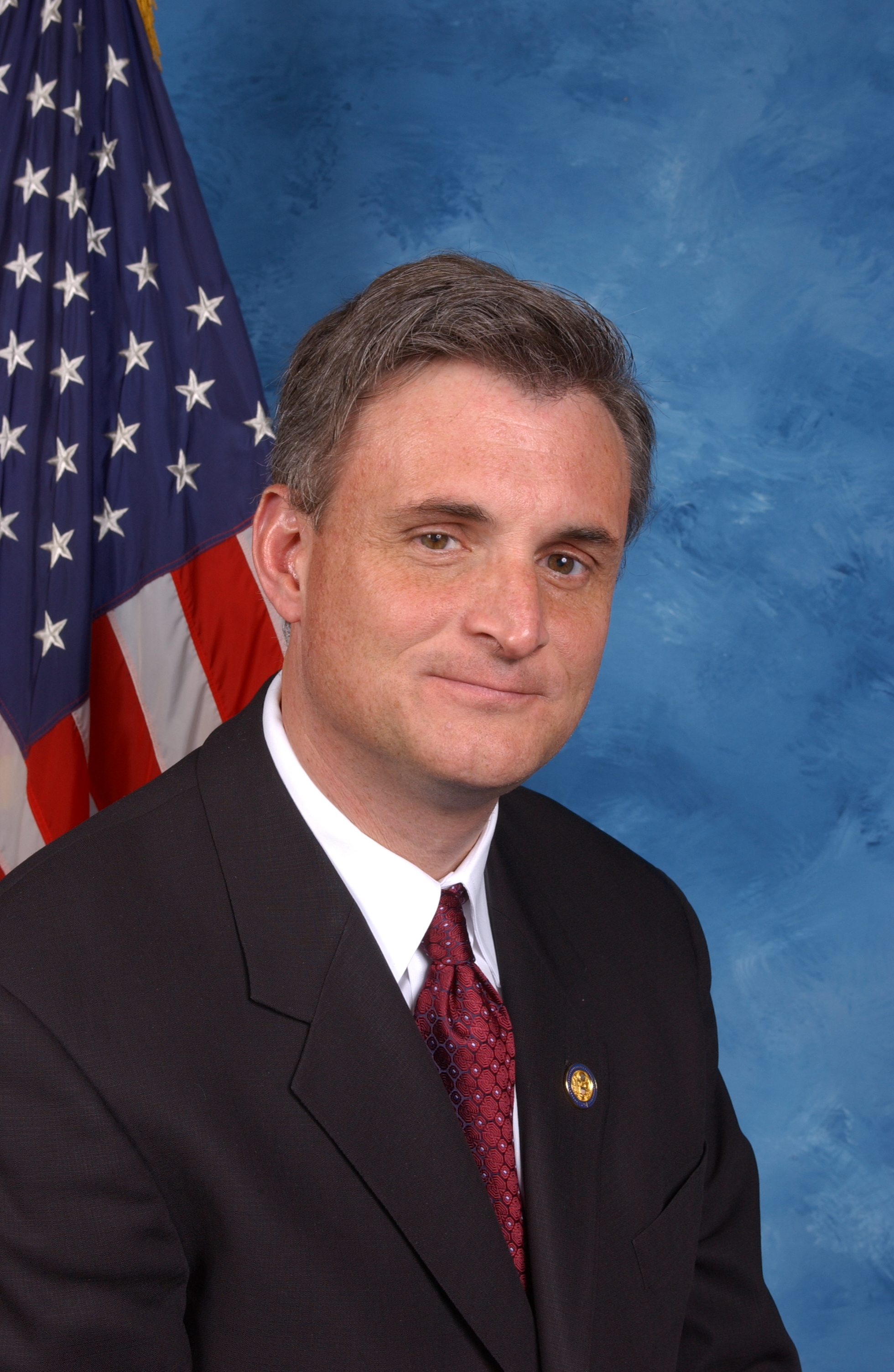
Rob Andrews

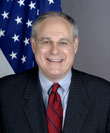
William B. Wood

=== Legislators ===
- Diane B. Allen, New Jersey state senator, Legislative District 7
- Lemuel Amerman, U.S. representative from Pennsylvania (1891–1893)
- Rob Andrews, U.S. representative from New Jersey (1990–2014)
- J. Thompson Baker, U.S. representative from New Jersey (1913–1915), founder of Wildwood and Wildwood Crest, designed and built the J. Thompson Baker House
- Ward R. Bliss, member of Pennsylvania House of Representatives (1889–1905), majority leader (1903–1904)
- Charles H. Ealy, president pro tempore of the Pennsylvania State Senate (1941–1944)
- Ivor D. Fenton, U.S. representative from Pennsylvania
- Benjamin K. Focht, U.S. representative from Pennsylvania
- Matt Gabler, member of Pennsylvania House of Representatives
- John A. Giannetti, member of Maryland Senate, District 21
- Lincoln Hulley, member of Florida Senate, District 28
- Norman J. Levy, member of New York State Senate, (1971–1998)
- Alexander McDonald, U.S. Senator from Arkansas (1868–1871)
- Ruth McNamee, member of the Michigan House of Representatives
- Thomas J. Philips (1846–1939), member of the Pennsylvania House of Representatives
- William Shadrack Shallenberger, U.S. representative from Pennsylvania (1877–1883)
- Simon Peter Wolverton, U.S. representative from Pennsylvania (1891–1895)

=== Attorneys and judges ===
- Thomas J. Baldrige, attorney general of Pennsylvania, Superior Court judge and president judge
- Matthew Bogdanos, New York City assistant district attorney, and author
- Brynja McDivitt Booth, justice of the Supreme Court of Maryland
- Charles E. Bunnell, judge of the United States Territorial Court for the Alaska Territory
- John Warren Davis, judge of the United States Court of Appeals for the Third Circuit
- Oliver Booth Dickinson, judge of the United States District Court for the Eastern District of Pennsylvania
- Frederick Voris Follmer, judge of the United States District Courts for the Eastern, Middle, and Western Districts of Pennsylvania, chief judge of the Middle District of Pennsylvania
- Gitanjali Gutierrez, first lawyer to meet with a detainee at Guantanamo Bay, Information Commissioner for Bermuda
- Robert Dixon Herman, judge of the United States District Court for the Middle District of Pennsylvania
- William Hoeveler, judge of the United States District Court for the Southern District of Florida, presided over Manuel Noriega trial
- Albert Williams Johnson, judge of the United States District Court for the Middle District of Pennsylvania

=== Mayors ===
- Neal Blaisdell, 11th mayor of Honolulu
- Thomas Richards, 68th mayor of Rochester, New York

=== Diplomats ===
- David Jayne Hill, diplomat, ambassador, and writer
- William Braucher Wood, former U.S. ambassador to Afghanistan

=== Activists ===
- Ye Htoon, Burmese political dissident

=== Other ===
- Theodore R. Beale, Republican activist and writer
- Charles J. Beerstecher, delegate to California's Second Constitutional Convention, member of the California Railroad Commission
- Ben T. Elliott, director of speech writing during President Ronald Reagan's administration
- Jay Fisette, member of Arlington County, Virginia's Board of Supervisors
- Dan Oates, Aurora, Colorado police chief
- Norman Thomas, six-time US presidential candidate for the Socialist Party of America 1928–1948
- Janet Woodcock, physician and commissioner of the U.S. Food and Drug Administration

== Journalism ==
- Jim Vicevich, radio talk show host of WTIC-AM's Sound Off Connecticut

== Literature ==
- Peter Balakian, author and poet, winner of the 2016 Pulitzer Prize for Poetry
- David Kahn, historian, journalist, and writer, author of The Codebreakers
- Michael Malice, author, columnist, and media personality
- Philip Roth, author, winner of the Pulitzer Prize and the National Book Award, and recipient of the National Humanities Medal and the Man Booker International Prize
- Betsy Sholl, poet laureate of Maine, 2006–2011
- Bruce Smith, poet
- Lewis Edwin Theiss, author
- Nancy Wood, poet and photographer

== Medical ==
- Bartley P. Griffith, Hales Distinguished Professor of Surgery, University of Maryland, transplant and artificial organ pioneer, performed world's first genetically modified pig organs in two heart recipients
- Shaw Loo, Burma's first physician
- Bonnie Spring, professor of preventive medicine, psychology and psychiatry at the Northwestern University Feinberg School of Medicine

== Military ==
- Martin Blumenson, military historian and author
- Charles I. Carpenter, first chief of Chaplains of the United States Air Force
- Susan J. Crawford, lawyer and judge who served as the Convening Authority for the Guantanamo military commissions, chief judge of the United States Court of Appeals for the Armed Forces, inspector general of the Department of Defense; also chair of Bucknell Board of Trustees
- Stephen J. Maranian, retired United States Army major general; highest ranking Armenian American to serve in the U.S. Army
- Lewis Merrill, Union Army general; attended prior to entering West Point
- George H. Ramer, United States Marine lieutenant, posthumously received the Medal of Honor on January 7, 1953
- Theodore Van Kirk, Enola Gay navigator
- Lawrence Wilkerson, retired Army colonel, former chief of staff to Colin Powell, vocal critic of the Iraq war; attended for three years before volunteering for service in Vietnam

== Religion ==
- Samuel Zane Batten, Baptist minister, established the Commission on Social Service of the American Baptist Association
- Tim Keller, theologian and pastor of the Redeemer Presbyterian Church, New York City

== Sports ==
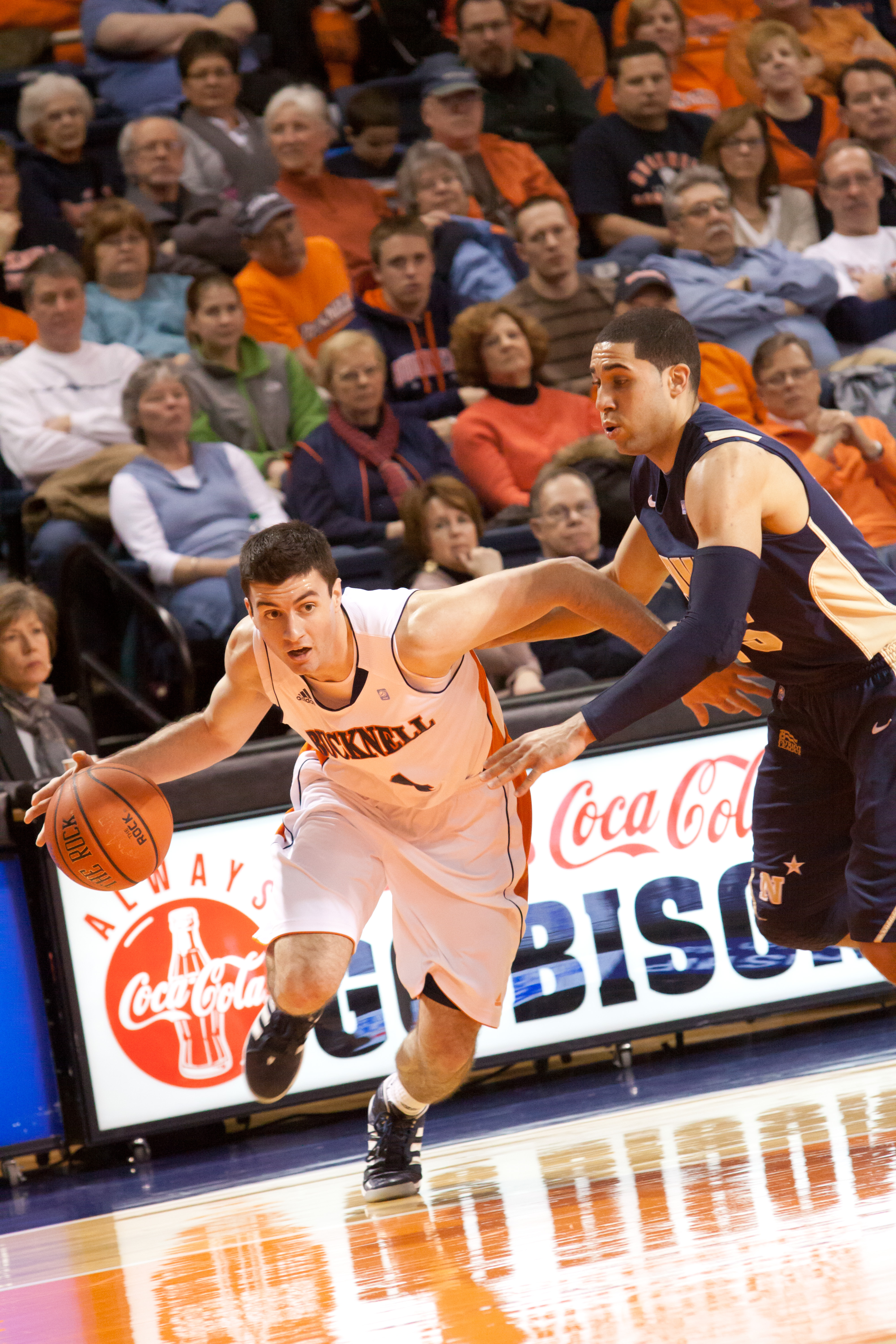
Bryan Cohen

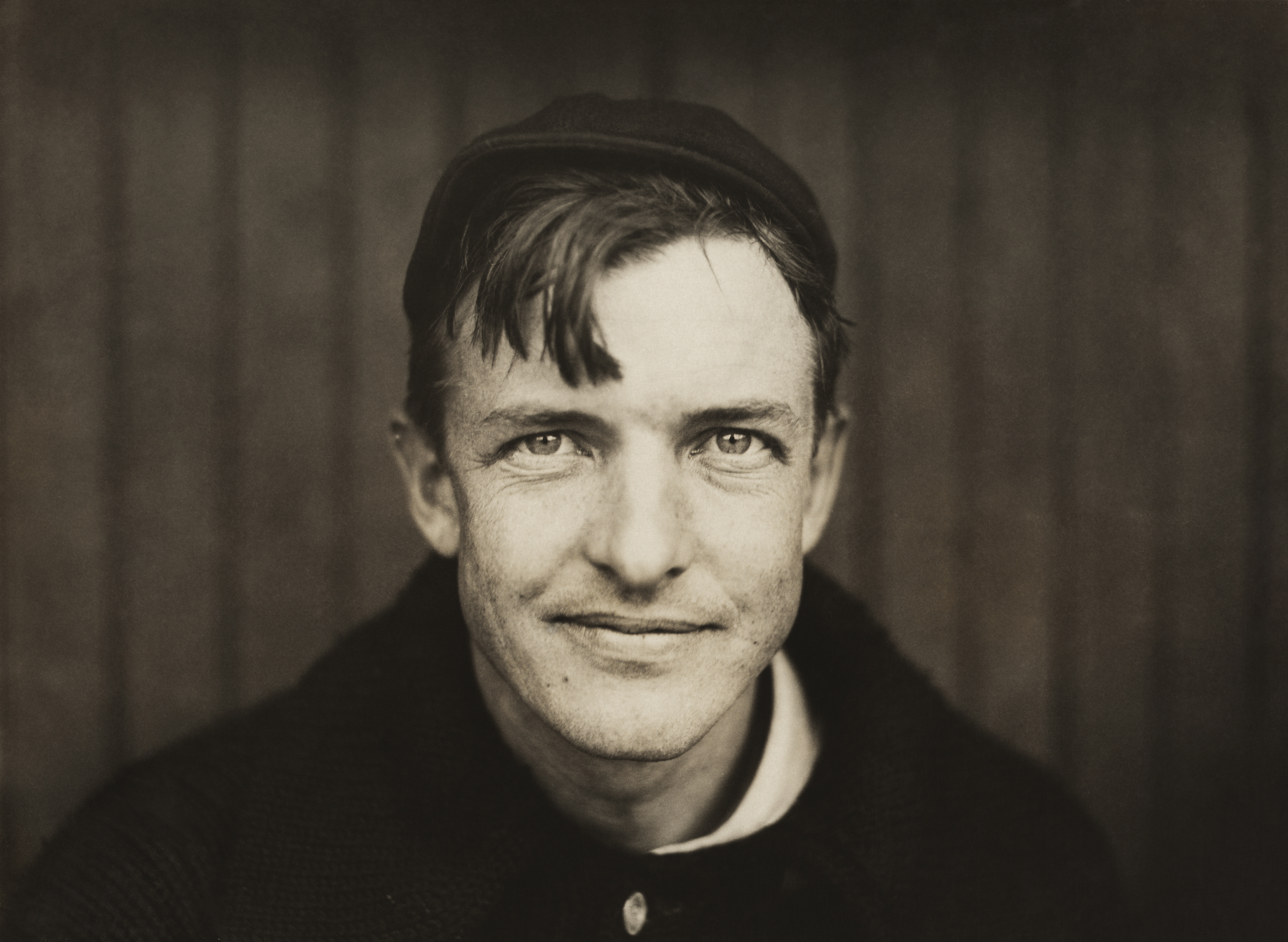
Christy Mathewson

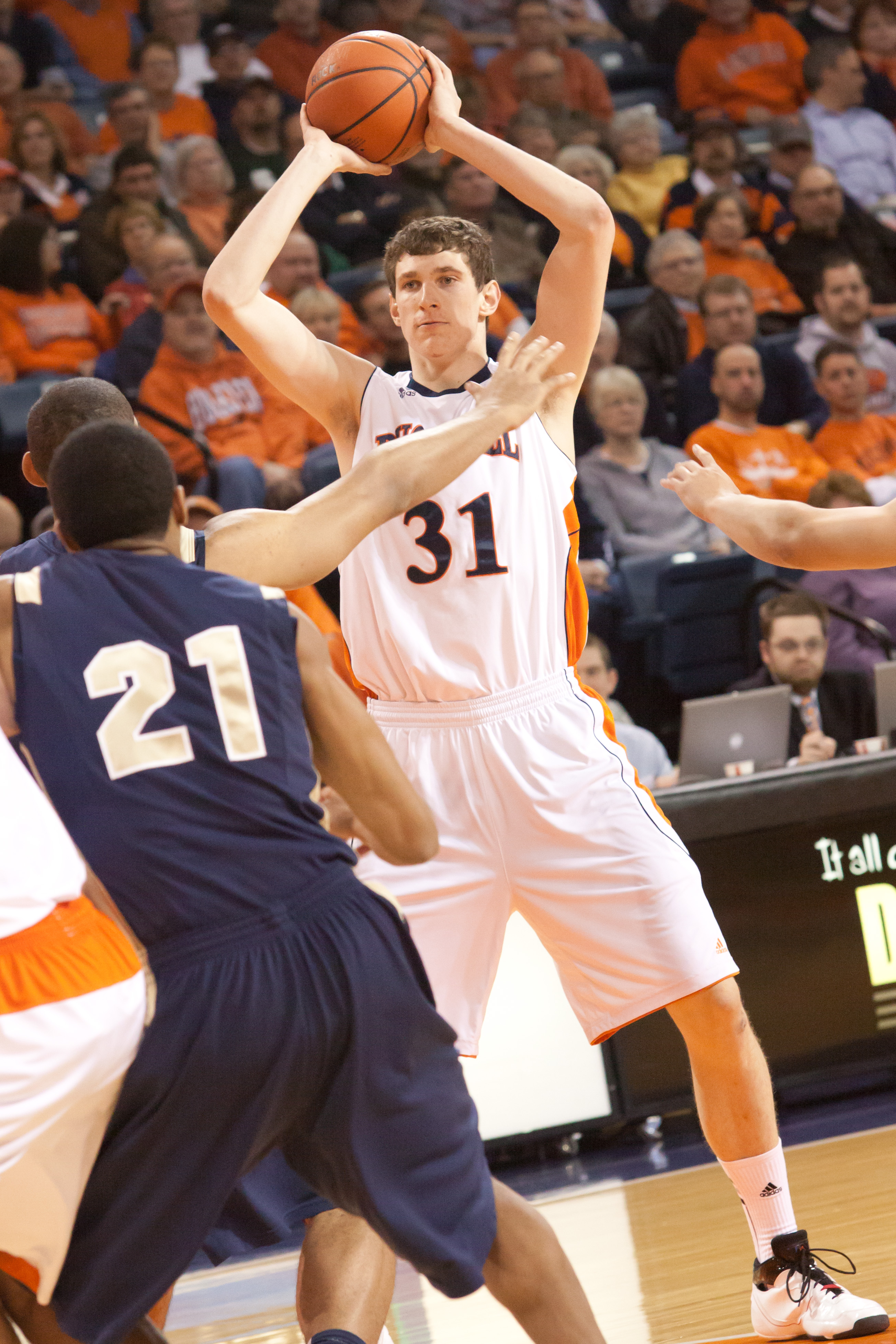
Mike Muscala

- Jim Albus, professional golfer
- Earl Beecham, NFL running back, played for the New York Giants
- George Buckheit, long-distance runner
- Bryan Cohen (born 1989), American-Israeli basketball player
- Sean Conover, former NFL defensive end, played for the Tennessee Titans
- Andrew Copelan, head coach of the Fairfield Stags men's lacrosse team
- Bill Courtney, head coach of the Cornell Big Red men's basketball team
- Matt Daley, Major League Baseball pitcher, played for the New York Yankees and Colorado Rockies
- Sunil Gulati, president, United States Soccer Federation
- Sam Havrilak, NFL running back and receiver, played for the Baltimore Colts, in Super Bowl V became the first player in NFL history to complete a pass, catch a pass, and take a handoff in a Super Bowl
- Clarke Hinkle, NFL fullback, played for the Green Bay Packers, Hall of Fame inductee
- Jon Robert Holden, naturalized Russian basketball player, played for CSKA Moscow and Russian Olympic team
- Doggie Julian, former college and NBA basketball coach, led Holy Cross to NCAA national championship
- Bob Keegan, Major League Baseball pitcher, played for the Chicago White Sox, All-Star in 1954, threw a no-hitter (August 20, 1957)
- Christy Mathewson, former Major League Baseball player, member of the Baseball Hall of Fame
- Christopher McNaughton, German basketball international
- John Meeks (born 1999), basketball player in the Israeli Basketball Premier League
- Tom Mitchell, former NFL tight end with the Oakland Raiders, San Francisco 49ers, and Baltimore Colts with whom he won a Super Bowl
- Mike Muscala, Washington Wizards center/power forward
- Bill Reifsnyder, long-distance runner who won two U.S. marathon national titles
- Greg Schiano, former head coach of the Tampa Bay Buccaneers and the Rutgers Scarlet Knights football teams
- Tyler Senerchia, professional wrestler for All Elite Wrestling; former long-stick midfielder for the Bucknell Bison men's lacrosse team
- Nate Sestina (born 1997), basketball player in the Israeli Basketball Premier League
- Walt Szot, NFL tackle, played for the Chicago Cardinals and Pittsburgh Steelers
- Brett Wilkinson, Olympic rower in Athens 2004
- Ted Woodward, former head coach of the University of Maine basketball team
- Jay Wright, former head coach of the Villanova University basketball team, 2001–2022
- Weldon Wyckoff, Major League Baseball pitcher, played for the Philadelphia Athletics and Boston Red Sox
- George Young, general manager of the New York Giants, 1979–1997
