= List of Delta Upsilon members =

Delta Upsilon is a collegiate men's fraternity founded on November 4, 1834, at Williams College in Williamstown, Massachusetts. The following list of Delta Upsilon members includes notable initiates of an undergraduate chapters. It does not list honorary members, such as George W. Atherton, Aubrey Radcliffe, and Justin Smith Morrill. Also not listed is Dave Frohnmayer, initiated as a regular member by the University of Oregon chapter of Delta Upsilon in 2001 at the age of 61.

== Aviation ==
Name	Original chapter	Notability	Ref.
Terry Hart	Lehigh University	astronaut	
Frederick H. Hauck	Tufts University	astronaut	
Brewster H. Shaw	University of Wisconsin	astronaut	
George Welch	Purdue University	test pilot	

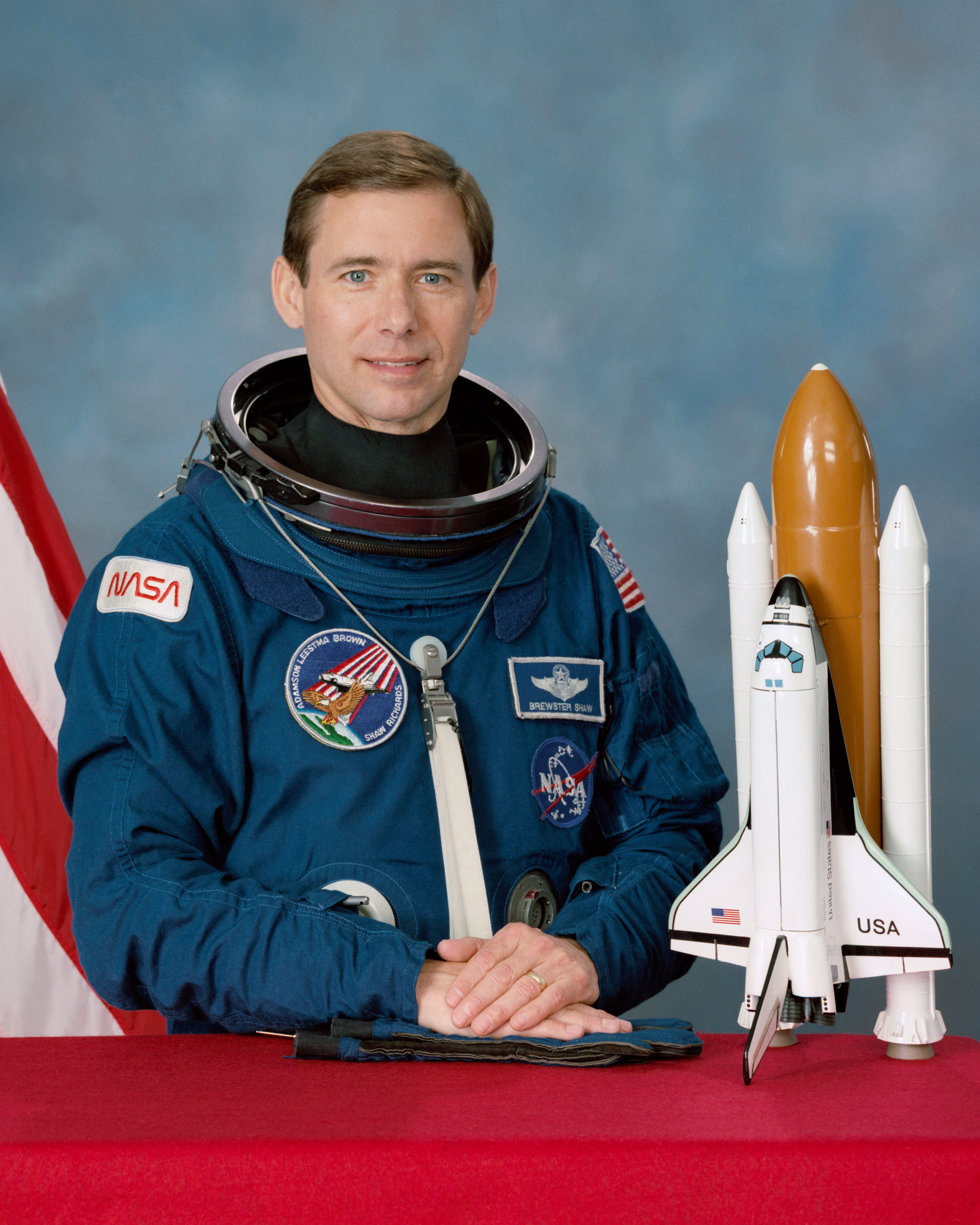
Brewster Shaw

== Business ==
Name	Original chapter	Notability	Ref.
William A. Baker	MIT	naval architect	
John Bello	Tufts University	founder of SoBe	
David Burpee	Cornell University	founder of Burpee Seeds	
Chase Carey	Colgate University	CEO of DirecTV	
Michael Eisner	Denison University	CEO of Walt Disney Company	
Clarence Francis	Amherst College	President of General Foods	
Wallace Trevor Holliday	Cornell University	President of Standard Oil of Ohio	
Semon E. Knudsen	MIT	President of Ford Motor Company	
Kōjirō Matsukata	Rutgers University	President of Kawasaki	
James S. McDonnell	MIT	Chairman of McDonnell-Douglas	
John P. Morgridge	University of Wisconsin	President of Cisco Systems	
William Beverly Murphy	University of Wisconsin	CEO of Campbell's	
David C. Novak	University of Missouri	Chairman of Yum! Brands	
Dan Nye	Hamilton College	CEO of LinkedIn	
Francis C. Osborn Sr.	Syracuse University	inventor and entrepreneur	
Thomas Perkins	MIT	partner at Kleiner Perkins Caufield & Byers	
Thomas Rowe Price Jr.	Swarthmore	founder of T. Rowe Price	
John W. Rogers	Miami University	Chairman and CEO of United Parcel Service	
Greg Skibiski	Bucknell University	CEO of Sense Networks	
Alfred P. Sloan	MIT	Chairman of General Motors	
Edward P. Taylor	McGill University	Chairman of Canadian Breweries Limited	
John Thain	MIT	CEO of Merrill Lynch	
Hermann V. von Holst	MIT	architect	
Kurt Vonnegut Sr.	MIT	architect	
Ward Wellington Ward	MIT	architect in Syracuse, New York	
Francis Winspear	University of Alberta	founder of Winspear Higgins Stevenson (merged with Deloitte in 1980)	

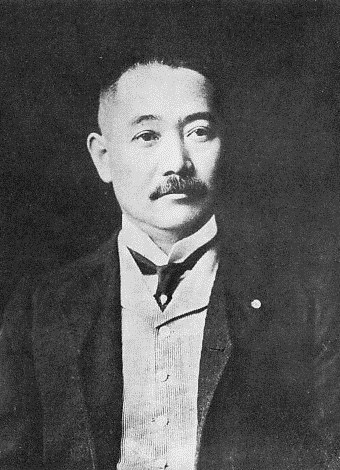
Kōjirō Matsukata

== Diplomacy ==
Name	Original chapter	Notability	Ref.
Jeff Bleich	Amherst College	United States Ambassador to Australia	
Warren Randolph Burgess	Brown University	United States Permanent Representative to NATO	
John Danilovich	Stanford University	United States Ambassador to Brazil	
Ron Irwin	University of Western Ontario	Canadian Ambassador to Ireland	
Kenneth Keating	University of Rochester	United States Ambassador to India	
Joseph P. Kennedy	Harvard University	United States Ambassador to the United Kingdom	
Foy D. Kohler	Ohio State University	United States Ambassador to the Soviet Union	
Amos Peaslee	Swarthmore University	United States Ambassador to Australia	
Tom Riley	Stanford University	United States Ambassador to Morocco	

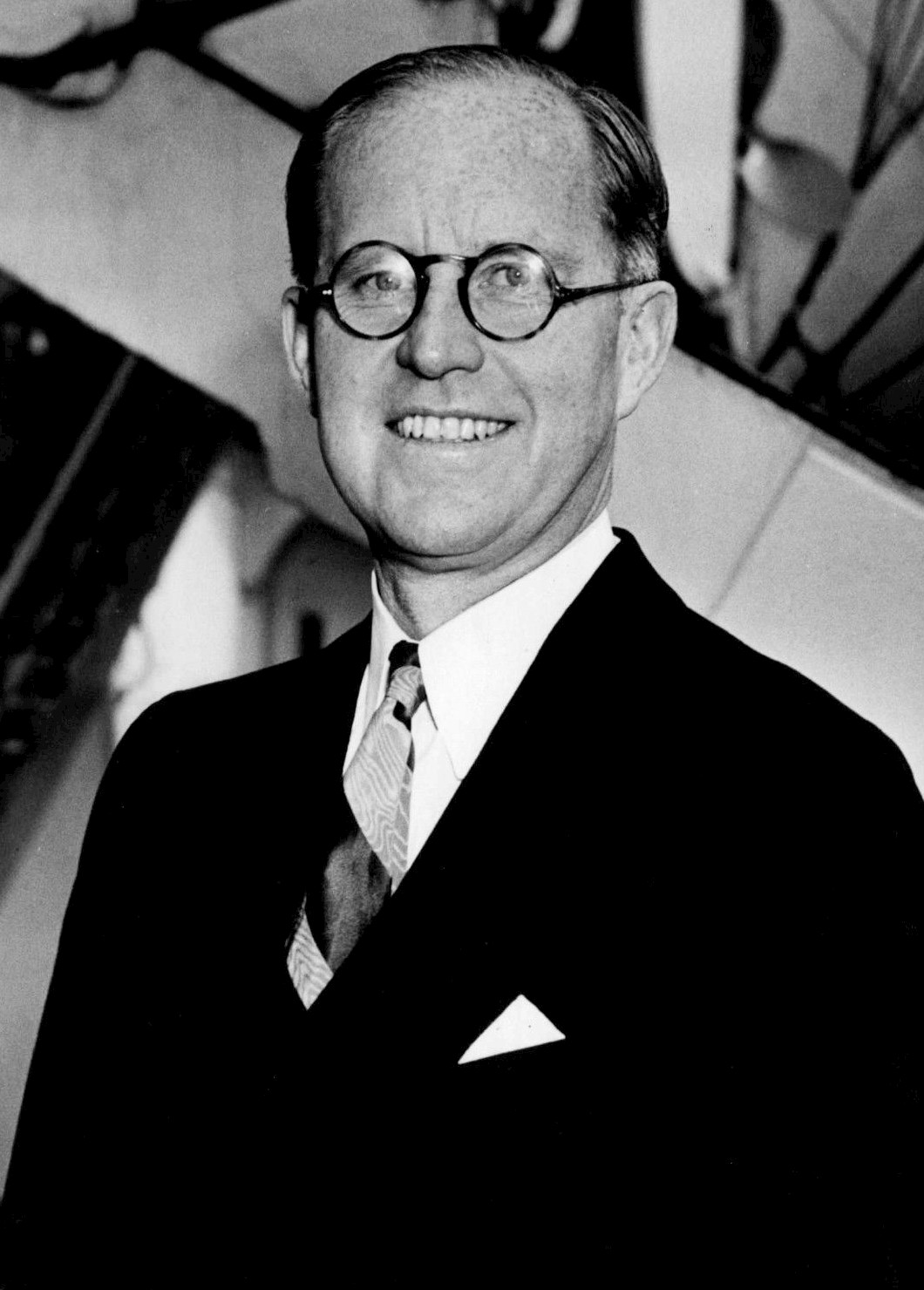
Joseph Kennedy

== Education ==
Name	Original chapter	Notability	Ref.
William R. Brody	MIT	President of Johns Hopkins University	
Edward Pennell Brooks	MIT	Dean of MIT Sloan School of Management	
Richard Cyert	Carnegie Mellon University	President of Carnegie Mellon University	
John Delaney	University of Florida	President of the University of North Florida	
Gordon P. Eaton	Wesleyan University	President of Iowa State University	
Melvin A. Eggers	Syracuse University	Chancellor of Syracuse University	
William H. P. Faunce	Brown University	President of Brown University	
Richard M. Ivey	University of Western Ontario	Chancellor of the University of Western Ontario	
George Howell Jones	Oregon State University	Architect of Portland Public Schools	
David Starr Jordan	Cornell University	President of Stanford University	
Paul J. Olscamp	University of Western Ontario	President of Bowling Green State University	
James Alfred Perkins	Swarthmore University	President of Cornell University	
Henry Rowan	MIT	School named after him Rowan University	
Roy Schwitters	MIT	Professor at University of Texas at Austin	
Phillip Shriver	Kent State University	President of Miami University	
John C. Warner	Carnegie Mellon University	President of Carnegie Mellon University	
Arthur K. Wheelock Jr.	Williams College	Professor of Art History at the University of Maryland	

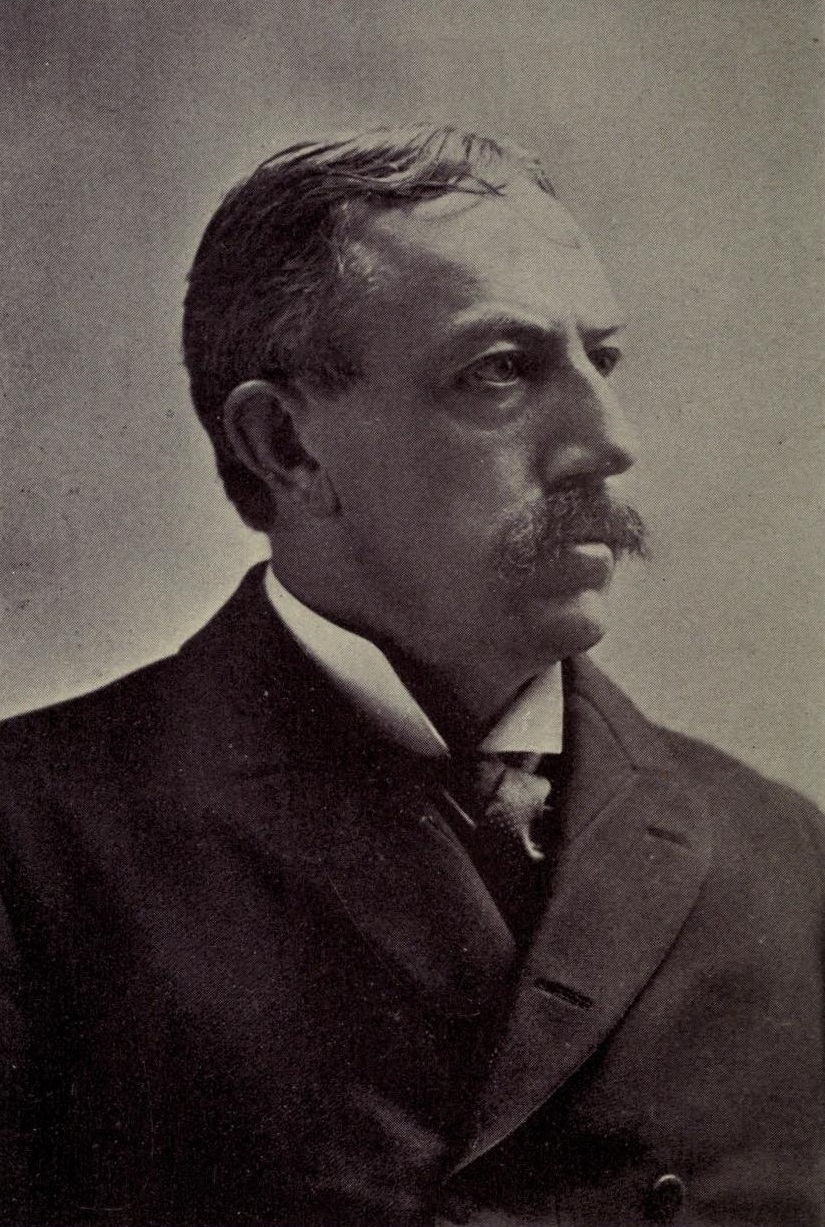
David Starr Jordan

== Film and television ==
Name	Original chapter	Notability	Ref.
Robert Benchley	Harvard University	winner of the 1935 Academy Award for Best Short Film (How to Sleep)	
Edgar Bergen	Northwestern University	ventriloquist	
Trevor Wallace	San Jose State University	Internet star. Known for "Ain't no laws when you're drinking Claws"	
Harry Carey	New York University	silent film star	
Jason Lewis	San Diego State University	actor, played "Jerry Jerrod" in Sex and the City	
Joseph Losey	Harvard University	director of Modesty Blaise, M, The Damned, and King & Country	
Gabriel Macht	Carnegie-Mellon University	actor, played "Harvey Specter" in Suits	
Alan Thicke	University of Western Ontario	actor, played "Jason Seaver" in Growing Pains	
Rawson Marshall Thurber	Union College	film director, "Dodge Ball", "Skyscraper", "We're the Millers"	

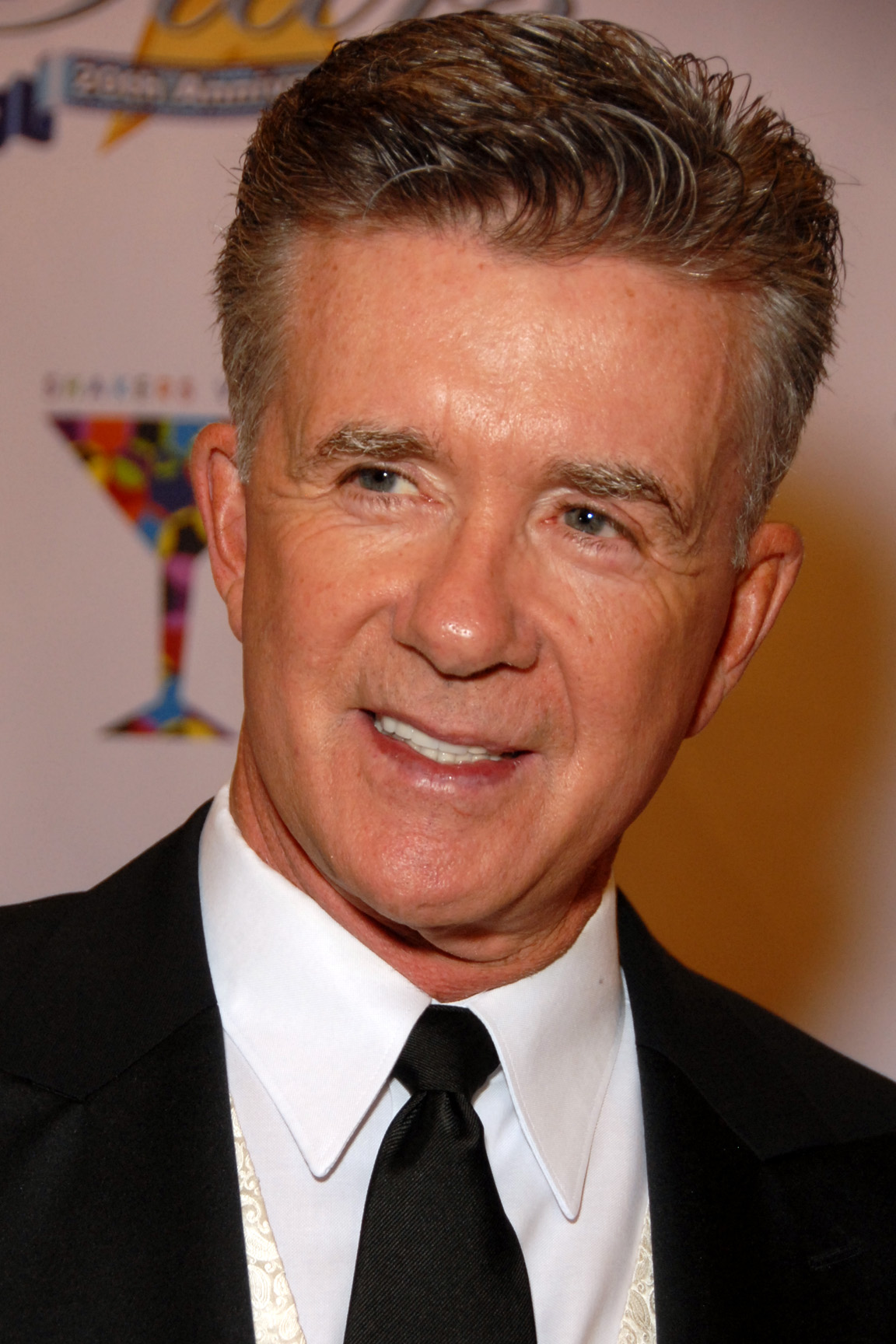
Alan Thicke

== Government ==
Name	Original chapter	Notability	Ref.
Les Aspin	Marquette University	United States Secretary of Defense	
William H. Avery	University of Kansas	Governor of Kansas	
N. Lloyd Axworthy	University of Manitoba	Canadian Minister of Foreign Affairs	
Michael D. Barnes	University of North Carolina	United States House of Representatives	
Edward Bassett	Hamilton College	United States House of Representatives	
Daniel Bigelow	Union College	Treasurer of Thurston County, Washington	
Austin Blair	Hamilton College	United States House of Representatives	
Theodore R. Boehm	Brown University	Judge of the Indiana Supreme Court	
Fenton W. Booth	DePauw University	Judge of the United States Court of Claims	
William Bross	Williams College	Lieutenant Governor of Illinois	
Herbert Brownell Jr.	University of Nebraska	United States Attorney General	
Robert Jensen Bryan	University of Washington	Judge of the United States District Court for the Western District of Washington	
Clifford P. Case	Rutgers University	United States Senate	
James B. Conant	Harvard University	High Commissioner for Occupied Germany	
John Bertrand Conlan	Northwestern University	United States House of Representatives	
Thomas Dang	University of Alberta	Legislative Assembly of Alberta	
Beman Dawes	Marietta College	United States House of Representatives	
Charles G. Dawes	Marietta College	Vice-President of the United States	
David S. Dennison Jr.	Williams College	United States House of Representatives	
Alan J. Dixon	University of Illinois	United States Senate	
William G. Donnan	Union College	United States House of Representatives	
Paul Douglas	Bowdoin College	United States Senate	
Thomas H. Eliot	Harvard University	United States House of Representatives	
John Elston	University of California	United States House of Representatives	
Harry Lane Englebright	University of California	United States House of Representatives	
David Emerson	University of Alberta	Canadian Minister of Foreign Affairs	
Charles Farnsley	University of Louisville	United States House of Representatives	
Stephen Johnson Field	Williams College	Associate Justice of the Supreme Court of the United States	
Joseph L. Fisher	MIT	United States House of Representatives	
George B. Francis	Brown University	United States House of Representatives	
James A. Garfield	Williams College	President of the United States	
Willard Gemmill	DePauw University	Judge of the Indiana Supreme Court	
George W. Goethals	City College of New York	Governor of the Panama Canal Zone	
Percy Griffiths	Pennsylvania State University	United States House of Representatives	
Robert P. Hanrahan	Bowling Green State University	United States House of Representatives	
John S. Herrington	Stanford University	United States Secretary of Energy	
John David Holschuh	Miami University	Judge of the United States District Court for the Southern District of Ohio	
Charles Evans Hughes	Colgate University	Governor of New York and Chief Justice of the United States	
Arthur M. Hyde	University of Michigan	United States Secretary of Agriculture	
F. Ray Keyser Jr.	Tufts University	Governor of Vermont	
John A. Lafore Jr.	Swarthmore University	United States House of Representatives	
Alexander B. Lamberton	University of Rochester	park commissioner of Rochester, New York	
Daniel S. Lamont	Union College	United States Secretary of War	
Gerald Landis	Indiana University	United States House of Representatives	
Charles B. Law	Amherst College	United States House of Representatives	
Caleb R. Layton	Amherst College	United States House of Representatives	
David E. Lilienthal	DePauw University	Chairman of the United States Atomic Energy Commission	
E. Peter Lougheed	University of Alberta	Premier of Alberta and Queen's Privy Councilor	
William Melville Martin	University of Toronto	Premier of Saskatchewan	
Thomas B. McCabe	Swarthmore College	Chairman of the Federal Reserve Board of Governors	
William H. H. Miller	Hamilton College	United States Attorney General	
Toby Moffett	Syracuse University	United States House of Representatives	
Thomas E. Morgan	Lafayette College	United States House of Representatives	
C. William O'Neill	Marietta College	Governor of Ohio	
Frank C. Partridge	Middlebury College	United States Senate	
Lester B. Pearson	University of Toronto	Prime Minister of Canada	
Sumner T. Pike	Bowdoin College	Chairman of the United States Atomic Energy Commission	
Chuck Poochigian	Fresno State University	Judge of the California Court of Appeal (5th Appellate District)	
Redfield Proctor Jr.	MIT	Governor of Vermont	
Winston L. Prouty	Lafayette College	United States Senate	
Chauncey W. Reed	Northwestern University	United States House of Representatives	
Robert B. Reich	Dartmouth College	United States Secretary of Labor	
John P. Robarts	University of Western Ontario	Premier of Ontario and Queen's Privy Councilor	
Hugh E. Rodham	Pennsylvania State University	father of First Lady of the United States Hillary Clinton	
Juan Manuel Santos	University of Kansas	President of Colombia	
Dan Satterberg	University of Washington	prosecuting attorney of King County, Washington	
Horace B. Smith	Williams College	United States House of Representatives	
Lewis Sperry	Amherst College	United States House of Representatives	
Bert L. Stafford	Middlebury College	Mayor of Rutland, Vermont	
Robert T. Stafford	Middlebury College	Governor of Vermont	
Robert H. Steele	Amherst College	United States House of Representatives	
Steve Stivers	Ohio State University	United States House of Representatives	
George Stobbs	Harvard University	United States House of Representatives	
Charles W. Stone	Williams College	United States House of Representatives	
David Taylor	Miami University	United States House of Representatives	
Arthur H. Vandenberg	University of Michigan	United States Senate	
Thomas J. Vilsack	Hamilton College	Governor of Iowa	
Allan Warrack	University of Alberta	Legislative Assembly of Alberta	
G. William Whitehurst	Washington and Lee University	United States House of Representatives	
Benjamin A. Willis	Union College	United States House of Representatives	
Jesse Younger	University of Washington	United States House of Representatives	

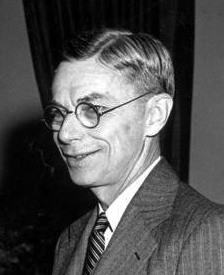
James Conant

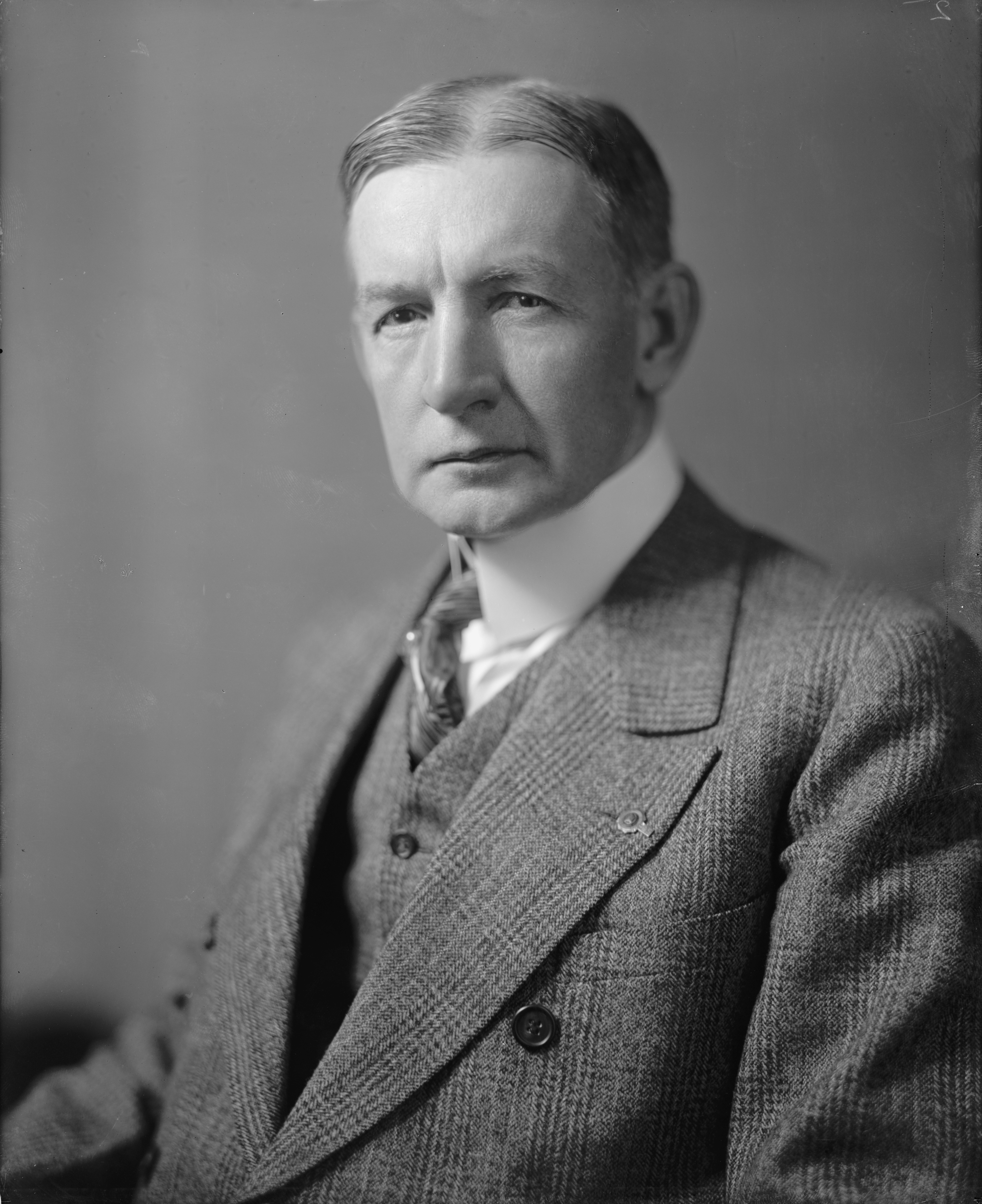
Charles Dawes

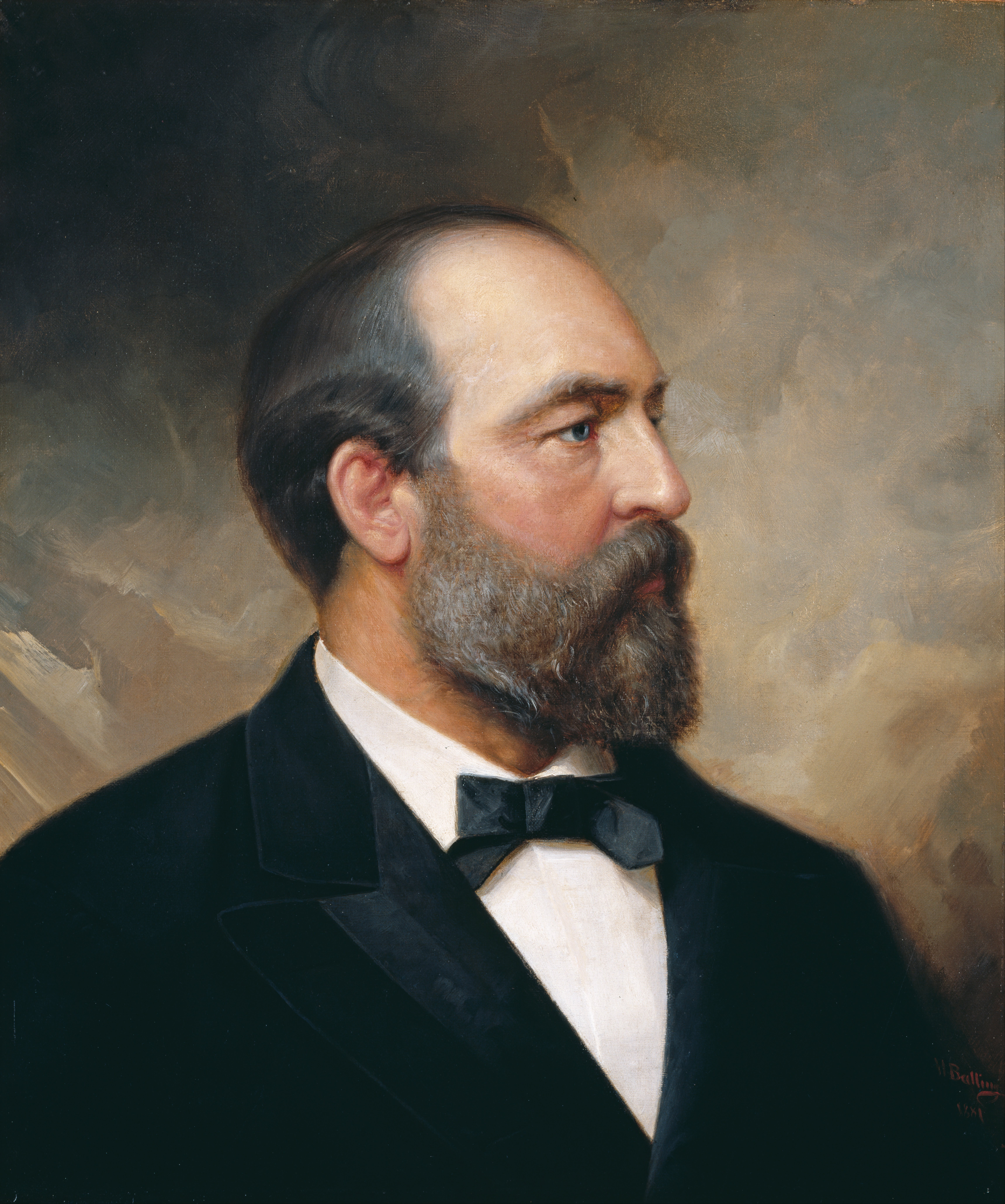
James Garfield

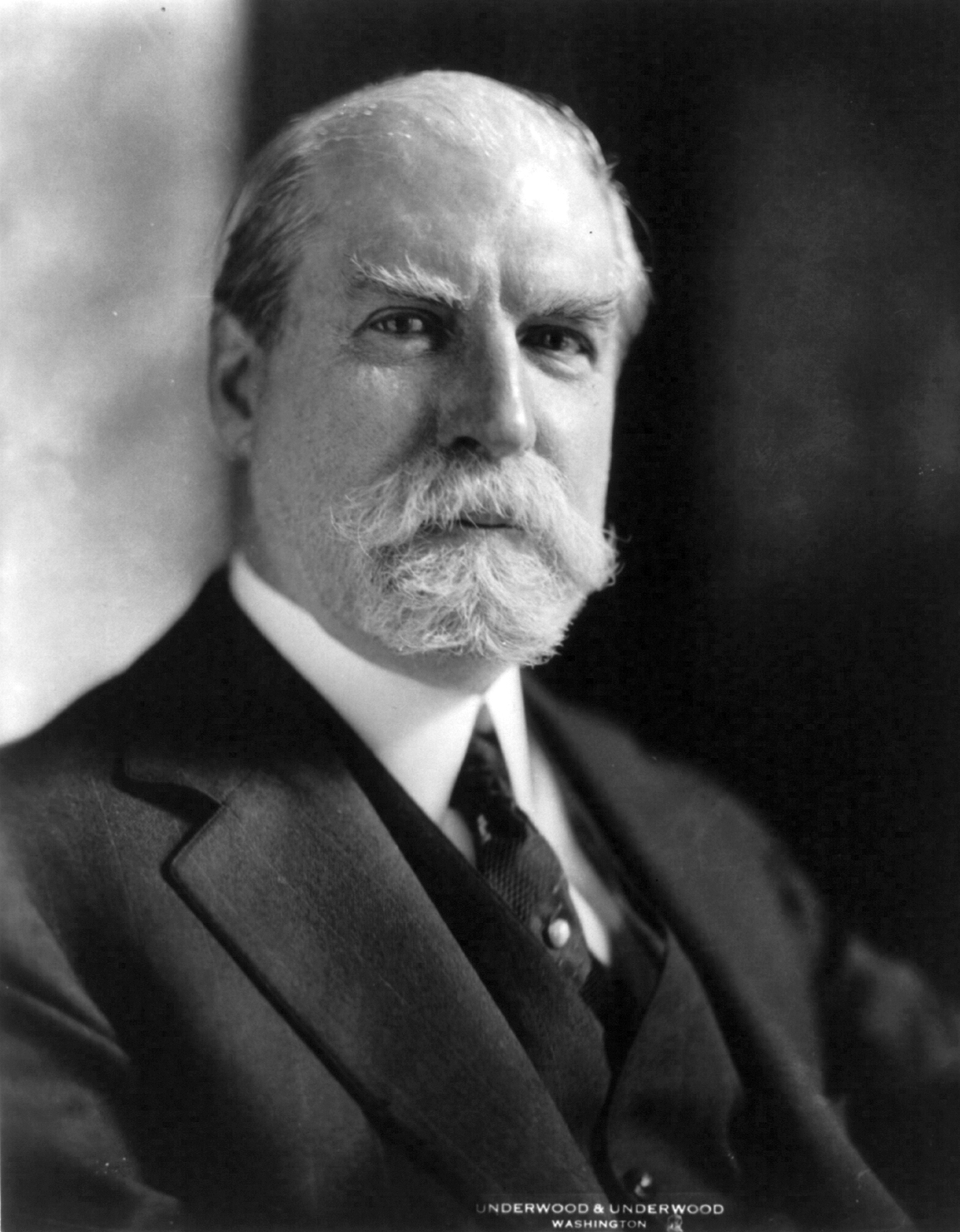
Charles Evans Hughes)

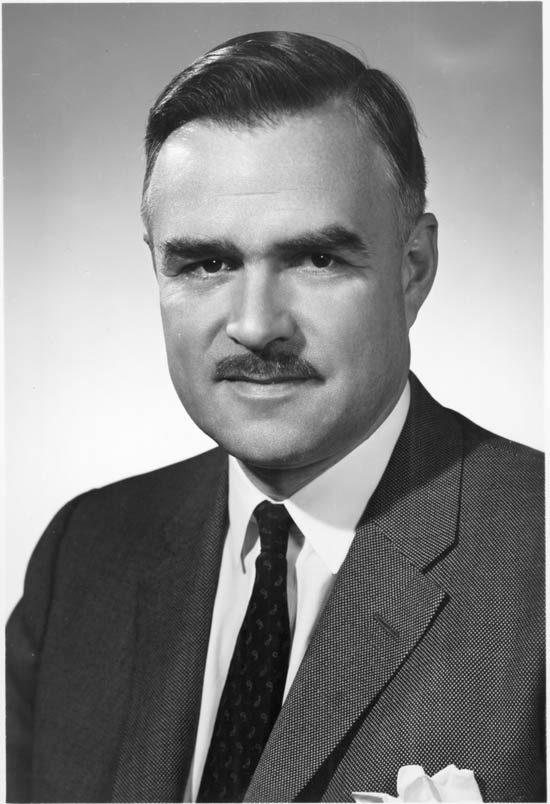
John Robarts

Juan Manuel Santos

== Journalism ==
Name	Original chapter	Notability	Ref.
Craig Bolerjack	Kansas State University	sports commentator for Fox College Football	
Heywood Hale Broun	Swarthmore College	reporter for CBS News	
Hedley Donovan	University of Minnesota	Editor-in-Chief of Time magazine	
Austin H. Kiplinger	Cornell University	publisher of the Kiplinger Letter	
Dwight E. Sargent	Colby College	curator of the Nieman Foundation for Journalism	
Leland Stowe	Wesleyan University	1930 Pulitzer Prize	
Richard Threlkeld	Ripon College	reporter for CBS News	

== Literature ==
Name	Original chapter	Notability	Ref.
Selamawi Asgedom	Harvard University	author of Of Beetles and Angels	
Tristram Potter Coffin	University of Pennsylvania	author of The British Traditional Ballad in North America	
Stephen Crane	Lafayette College	author of The Red Badge of Courage	
Rossiter Johnson	University of Rochester	author of George Washington: The Human Being and the Hero	
Joyce Kilmer	Rutgers University	author of "Trees"	
Richard A. Moran	Rutgers University	author of Never Confuse a Memo with Reality	
Kurt Vonnegut, Jr.	Cornell University	author of Slaughterhouse-Five and Cat's Cradle	

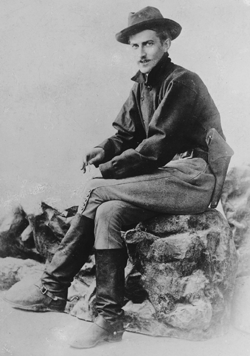
Stephen Crane

== Military ==
Name	Original chapter	Notability	Ref.
Harold Lothrop Borden	McGill University	heavily memorialized casualty of the Second Boer War	
John Arthur Clark	University of Toronto	Commanding General of the Seaforth Highlanders of Canada	
Tommy Franks	University of Texas	Combatant Commander, United States Central Command	
Cyrus Hamlin	Colby College	Commanding Colonel of the 80th Regiment, U.S. Colored Troops	
Gordon S. Heddell	University of Missouri	Inspector General of the U.S. Department of Defense	
John G. McMynn	Williams College	Commanding Colonel of the 10th Wisconsin Volunteer Infantry Regiment	
Henry C. Merriam	Colby College	Commanding Colonel of the 73rd Regiment, U.S. Colored Troops	
Michael A. Nelson	Stanford University	Lieutenant General in the United States Air Force	
David M. Shoup	DePauw University	Commandant of the United States Marine Corps	
Clarence Page Townsley	Union College	Superintendent of the United States Military Academy at West Point	
Douglas Black Weldon	University of Western Ontario	Commanding Colonel of the Royal Highland Fusiliers of Canada	

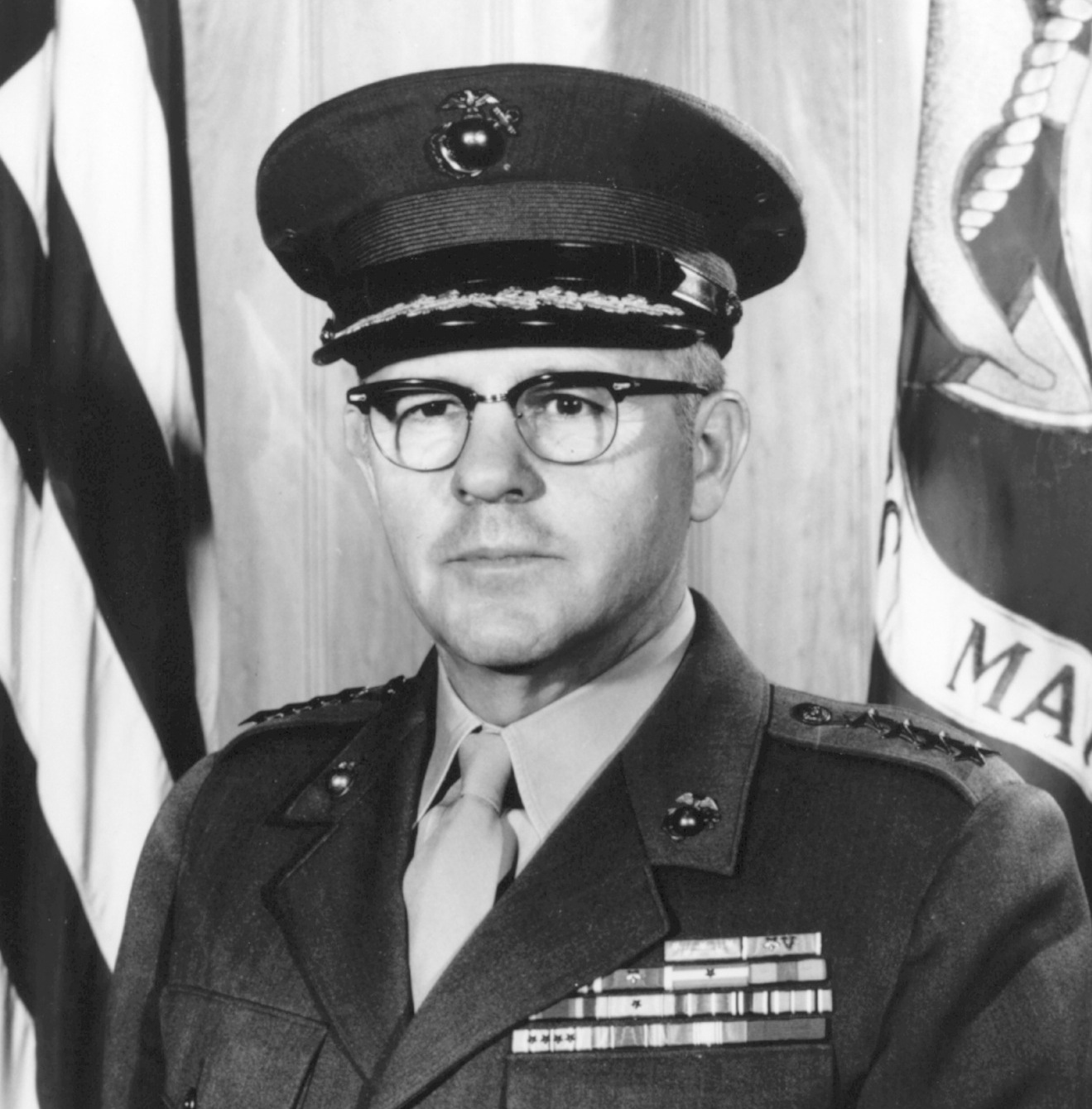
David Shoup

== Music ==
Name	Original chapter	Notability	Ref.
Frank Mills	McGill University	composer of Music Box Dancer and other songs	
Wilmot Moses Smith	Cornell University	lyricist of "Far Above Cayuga's Waters"	
Noel "Paul" Stookey	Michigan State University	vocalist and guitarist with Peter, Paul and Mary	
Donald J. Wright	University of Western Ontario	composer	
Pete Yorn	Syracuse University	vocalist and guitarist with The Olms	

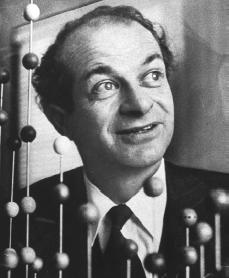
Linus Pauling

== Religion ==
Name	Original chapter	Notability	Ref.
Harry Emerson Fosdick	Colgate University	theologian and anti-Zionist	
Lars-Göran Lönnermark	Michigan State University	Chief Royal Chaplain to the King of Sweden	
Logan Herbert Roots	Harvard University	Bishop of Hankow	

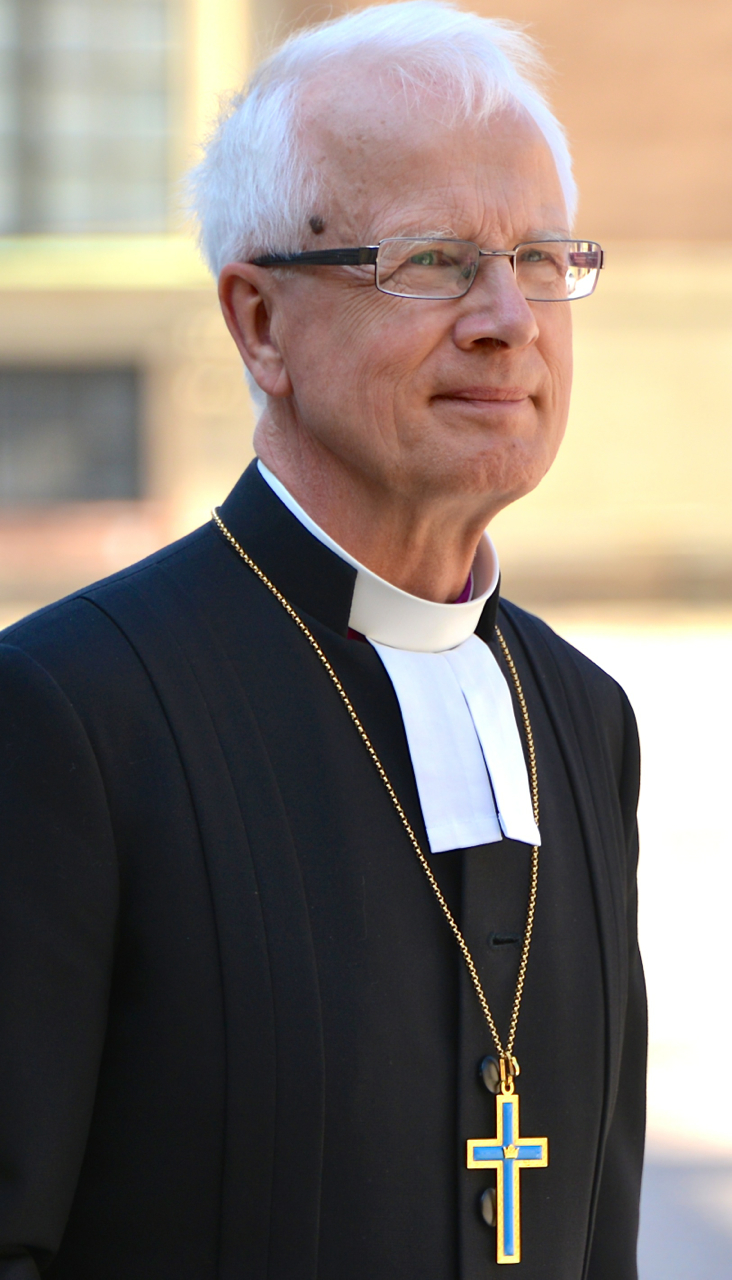
Lars-Göran Lönnermark

== Science ==
Name	Original chapter	Notability	Ref.
Christian B. Anfinsen	Swarthmore College	1972 Nobel Prize in Chemistry	
Arnold O. Beckman	University of Illinois	1988 National Medal of Technology, 1989 National Medal of Science	
Robert Cade	University of Texas	inventor of Gatorade	
William C. Dement	University of Washington	developed the Apnea–hypopnea index	
Don Francis	University of California	developed the Hepatitis B vaccine	
Laurens Hammond	Cornell University	inventor of the pipeless organ	
Henry Harpending	Hamilton College	geneticist and author of The 10,000 Year Explosion	
Charles F. Kettering	Ohio State University	1955 Hoover Medal	
Linus Pauling	Oregon State University	1954 Nobel Prize in Chemistry, 1962 Nobel Peace Prize	
Edward C. Prescott	Swarthmore College	2004 Nobel Prize in Economics	
David Schramm	MIT	1993 Lilienfeld Prize	
Albert Lindsey Zobrist	MIT	Zobrist hashing	

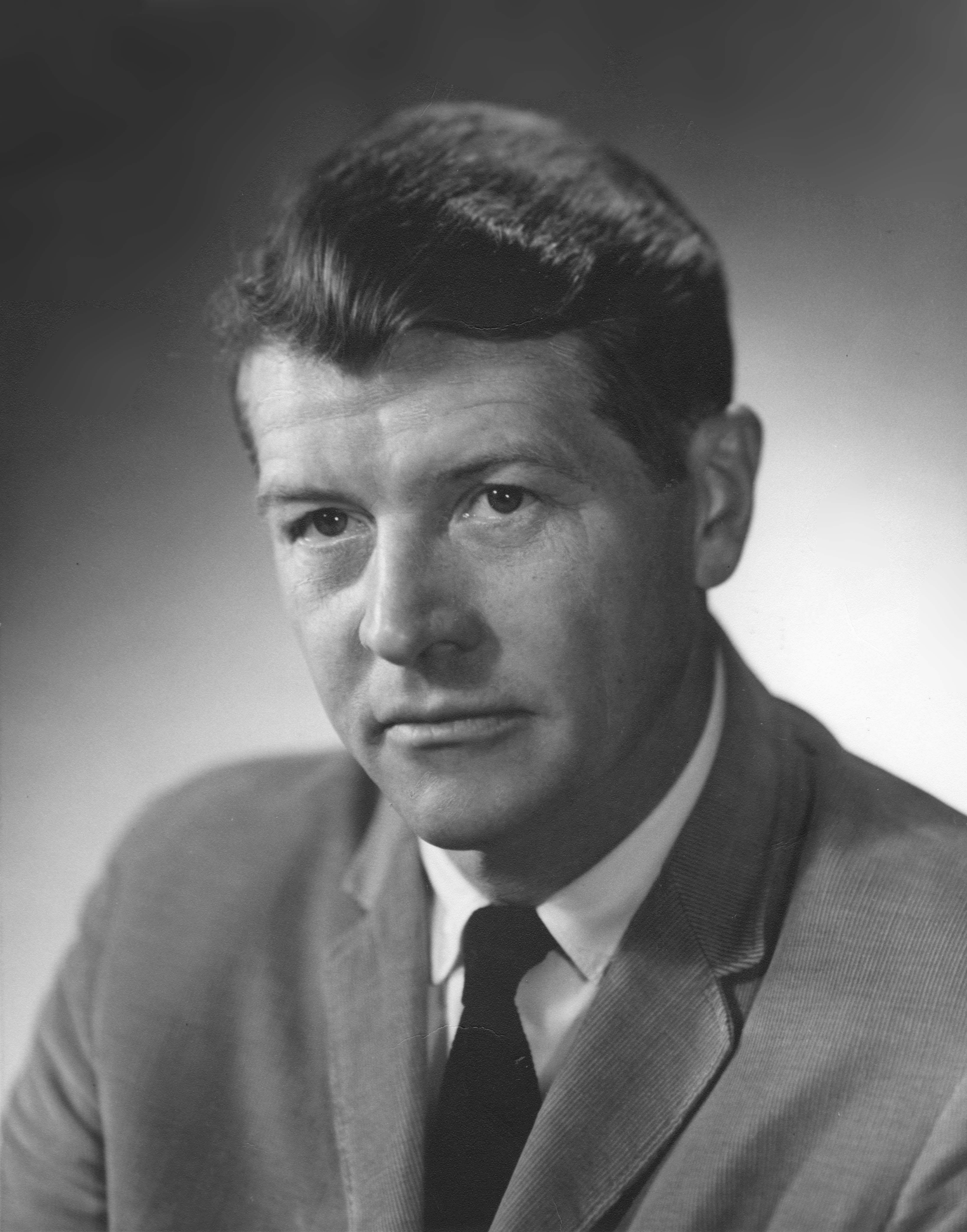
Christian Anfinsen

== Sports ==
Name	Original chapter	Notability	Ref.
John Anderson	Cornell University	gold medal, discus, Games of the V Olympiad (1932)	
Fred Arbanas	Michigan State University	Kansas City Chiefs player	
Horace Ashenfelter	Pennsylvania State University	gold medal, men's steeplechase, Games of the XV Olympiad (1952)	
George Blair	Miami University	only person to water-ski on all seven continents	
Jim Boeheim	Syracuse University	head basketball coach, Syracuse University	
Frank R. Burns	Rutgers University	head football coach, Rutgers University	
Jack Coombs	Colby College	Philadelphia A's player	
Bruce Coslet	University of the Pacific	head coach, Cincinnati Bengals	
Paul Flatley	Northwestern University	Minnesota Vikings player	
Hugh Gallarneau	Stanford University	Chicago Bears player	
Pete Gogolak	Cornell University	New York Giants player	
Clark Graebner	Northwestern University	runner-up, 1967 U.S. Open	
Randy Gregg	University of Alberta	Edmonton Oilers player	
Galen Hall	Pennsylvania State University	head football coach, University of Florida	
James H. Horne	Bowdoin College	head basketball coach, Indiana University	
Ned Irish	University of Pennsylvania	basketball promoter	
Craig Kelly	University of Washington	1988, 1989, 1990, and 1991 World Snowboard Champion	
Bob Kenney	University of Kansas	gold medal, basketball, Games of the XV Olympiad (1952)	
Harvey Kuenn	University of Wisconsin	San Francisco Giants player	
Jim Les	Bradley University	head basketball coach, University of California at Davis	
Chad Little	Washington State University	NASCAR driver	
Mick Luckhurst	University of California	Atlanta Falcons player	
Jeff Ma	MIT	member of the MIT Blackjack Team	
Leland MacPhail	Swarthmore University	general manager, New York Yankees	
Ken Margerum	Stanford University	Chicago Bears player	
Paul Mokeski	University of Kansas	Milwaukee Bucks player	
Allie Morrison	University of Illinois	gold medal, wrestling, Games of the IV Olympiad (1928)	
Thurman Munson	Kent State University	New York Yankees player	
John Primrose	University of Alberta	trap shooter	
Jimmy Rodgers	University of Iowa	head coach, Boston Celtics	
Darrel Royal	University of Oklahoma	head football coach, University of Texas	
Ron Torgalski	Hamilton College (NY)	head baseball coach, University at Buffalo	
Peter Ueberroth	San Jose State University	Commissioner of Baseball	
Rick Venturi	Northwestern University	head football coach, Northwestern University	
Mike White	University of California	head coach, Oakland Raiders	
Mike Withycombe	Fresno State University	Cincinnati Bengals player	
Rowland Wolfe	Case Western Reserve University	gold medal, gymnastics, Games of the V Olympiad (1932)	

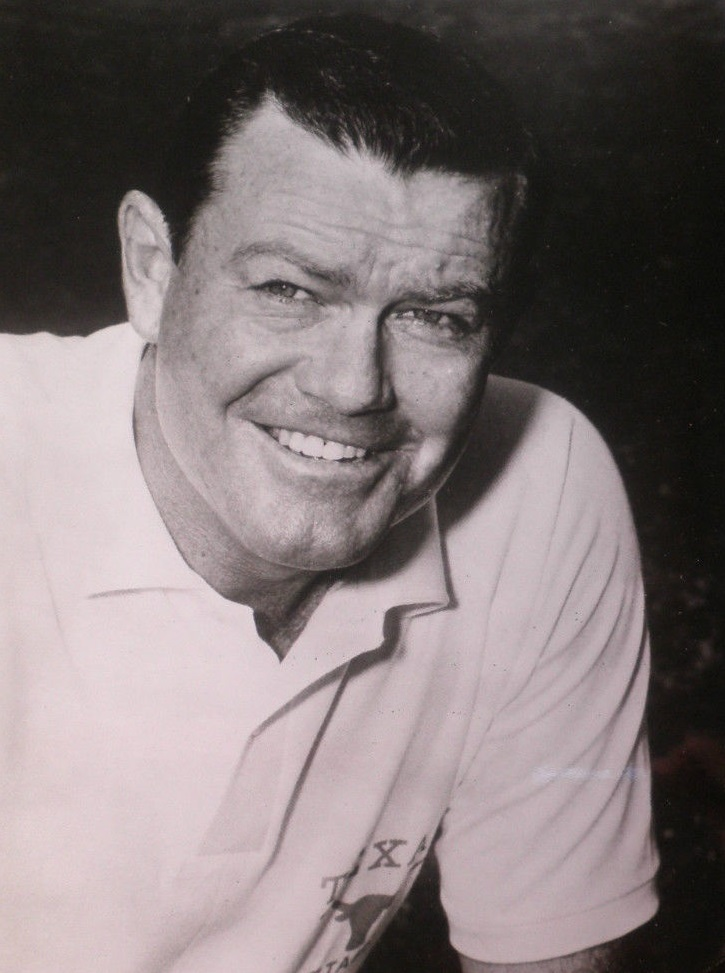
Darrel Royal

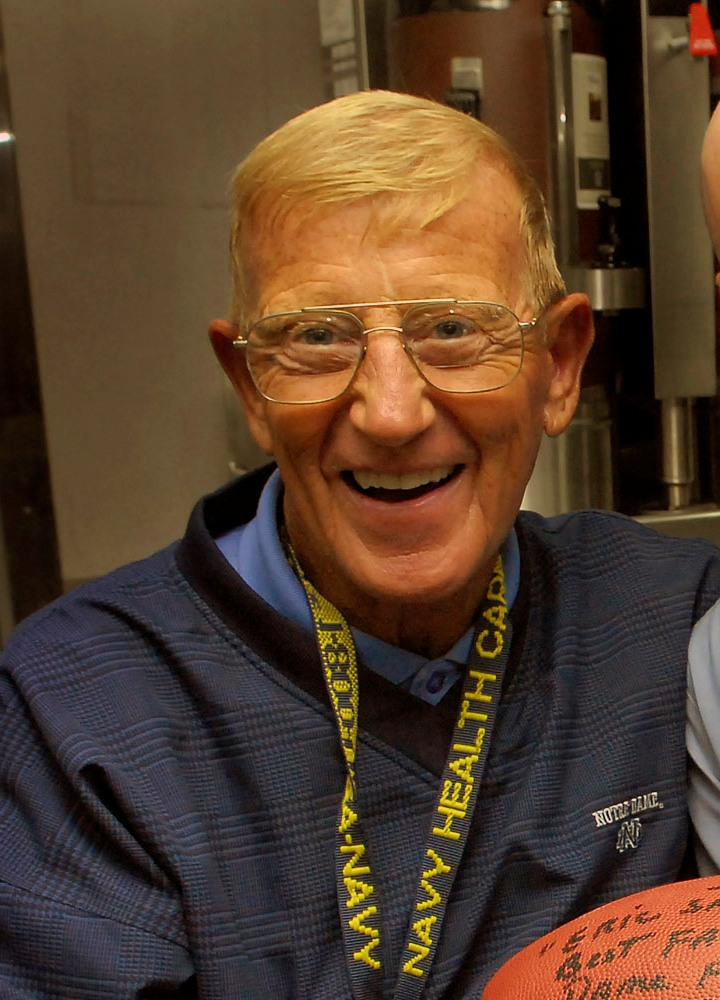
Lou Holtz

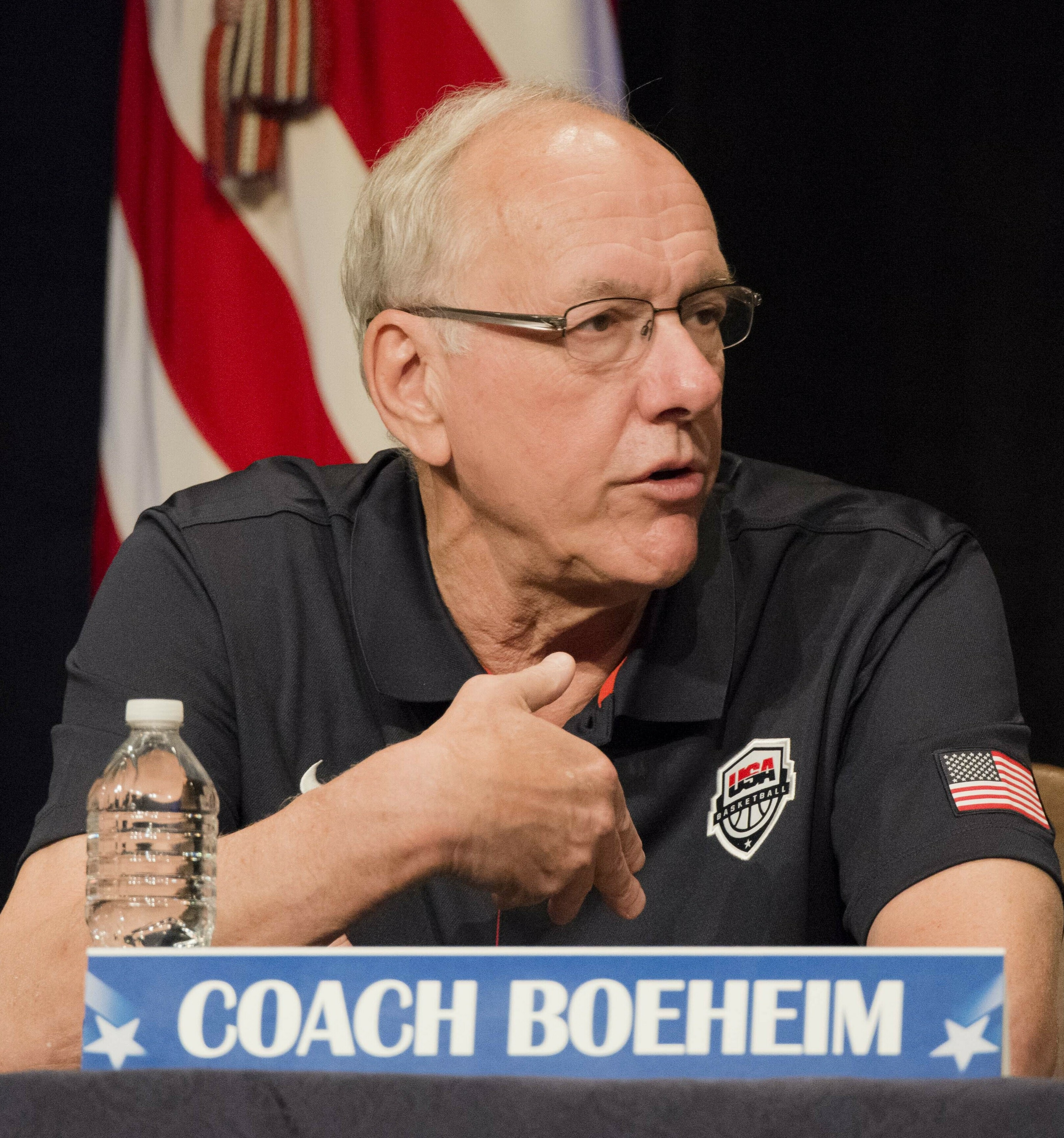
Jim Boeheim
