= List of Theta Chi members =

This is a list of notable members of Theta Chi fraternity.

== Academia ==
Name	Original chapter	Notability	Ref.
Michael F. Pogue-Geile	Gamma Kappa / Miami Ohio	Clinical Program Chair, Psychology, University of Pittsburgh	
Lee Bollinger	Alpha Sigma / Oregon	President of Columbia University	
John Sloan Dickey	Alpha Theta / Dartmouth	Former president of Dartmouth College	
Charles Dole	Alpha/Norwich	Former President of Norwich University	
William Durden	Pi/Dickinson	President of Dickinson College	
Ira Michael Heyman	Alpha Theta / Dartmouth	Former Chancellor, University of California	
Walter Stephenson Newman	Nu / Hampden-Sydney	Former President of Virginia Tech	
Charles H. Spooner	Alpha/Norwich	Former President of Norwich University	
William J. Taverner	Upsilon / NYU	Sexologist, author and editor of sexuality texts, including the American Journal of Sexuality Education	
Robert A. Weygand	Eta / Rhode Island	Vice president for administration of the University of Rhode Island, former Lieutenant Governor of Rhode Island, former U.S. Representative for 2nd District of Rhode Island	

== Business and industry ==
Name	Original chapter	Notability	Ref.
Paul R. Andrews	Alpha / Norwich	Former President and Chairman, Prentice-Hall	
Ronald Batory		President and COO, Consolidated Rail Corporation Conrail	
James L. Bauchat	Alpha Gamma / Michigan	Former Vice President of American Tobacco Company; former President and CEO of Sunshine Biscuits, Inc.	
Robert J. Coughlin	Gamma Kappa/Miami Ohio	Former CEO, Paycor, Cincinnati, Ohio	
Jack DeBoer	Beta Zeta / Michigan State	Former Chairman and CEO of Residence Inns; Xerox Board of Trustees member; co-founder, Chairman, and CEO of Candlewood Suites; founder of Summerfield Suites; co-founder of Cambridge Suites and Value Inn	
Russell DeYoung	Beta Lambda / Akron	Former Chairman and CEO, Goodyear Tire & Rubber Co.	
Samuel DiPiazza	Alpha Phi / Alabama	Global CEO, PricewaterhouseCoopers	
Robert E. Eberly	Omega / Penn State	Penn State benefactor	
Crawford H. Greenewalt	Beta/MIT	Former CEO of DuPont, worked on the Manhattan Project	
David R. Goode	Gamma Sigma / Duke	Retired Chairman, President, and CEO of Norfolk Southern Corporation	
Mike Greenberg	Delta Iota / Northwestern University	Co-host of ESPN's Mike and Mike in the Morning	reas
J. William Grimes	Delta Gamma / West Virginia Wesleyan	Former President and CEO of ESPN; Former Vice President of CBS Broadcasting Group	
William K. Howell	Omicron/Richmond	Former President of Miller Brewing Company	
Tony Hulman Sr.	Delta Pi / Indiana State	Former CEO of Indianapolis Motor Speedway and other endeavors (honorary member)	
Lee Iacocca	Beta Sigma / Lehigh	Former Chairman and CEO, Chrysler Corporation; President of Ford Motor Company	
Marcin Kleczynski	Rho/Illinois	Founder and CEO of Malwarebytes	
Herbert E. Lister	Gamma Xi / San Jose State	Former President and CEO, AllState Insurance	
Nick Mileti	Gamma Mu / Bowling Green	Former owner of the Cleveland Cavaliers, Cleveland Indians, Cleveland Crusaders, and the Coliseum at Richfield	
Herbert W. Morgan	Theta Iota / UC Santa Cruz	Senior Managing Director & Chief Investment Officer, Cantor Fitzgerald Investment Advisors	
Van L. Richey	Alpha Phi / Alabama	President and CEO, American Cast Iron Pipe Co.	
Philip Rinaldi	Epsilon Psi / NJIT	CEO of Philadelphia Energy Solutions	
Bob Sasser	Gamma Rho / Florida State University	CEO of Dollar Tree	
Eric Schiffer		CEO of 99 Cents Only stores	

== Entertainment ==
Name	Original chapter	Notability	Ref.
Steven Spielberg	Zeta Epsilon / CSU-Long Beach	Movie producer, writer, Academy Award-winning director	
Charles Addams	Iota/Colgate	Cartoonist for The New Yorker, creator of The Addams Family	
Edward Andrews	Xi/Virginia	Actor, appeared in over 50 films including Sixteen Candles and Gremlins	
Matt Austin		Actor, Date Movie	
Edgar Buchanan	Alpha Sigma / Oregon	Actor, starred on Petticoat Junction TV series	
Phil Buckman	Gamma Theta / San Diego State	Actor, musician	
Steve Buckingham	Omicron/Richmond	Grammy Award-winning music producer	
Rob Corddry	Theta/UMass	Screen actor and "Senior Correspondent" on The Daily Show with Jon Stewart	
CouRageJD	Iota Sigma/Towson	YouTuber and Twitch Streamer, former Shoutcaster	
Sammy Kaye	Alpha Tau / Ohio	Big Band leader and songwriter	
Joel McHale	Alpha Rho/Washington	Actor, Community and The Soup	
Gregory Nicotero	Zeta Lambda / Westminster	Executive producer of The Walking Dead	
Harry Reasoner	Alpha Pi / University of Minnesota	Former news anchor of ABC & CBS, editor of 60 Minutes	
Dan Resin	Alpha Iota / Indiana	Dr. Beeper in the movie Caddyshack	
Martin Rubeo	Gamma Eta / Bucknell	Musician and founding member of alternative rock band Gramsci Melodic	
Ben Silverman		Co-chairman of NBC Entertainment and Universal Media Studios	
Francis H. Striker	Gamma Pi / Buffalo	Writer, co-creator of the Lone Ranger and the Green Hornet	
Phil Vassar	Eta Kappa / James Madison	Country music star	
Bob Woodruff	Iota / Colgate University	Former co-anchor of ABC's World News Tonight (recuperating from wounds sustained while on assignment in Iraq in January 2006)	

== Literature and journalism ==
Name	Original chapter	Notability	Ref.
Radley Balko		Civil Rights reporter, The Washington Post	
Matt Gallagher	Gamma Omicron / Wake Forest University	Contributor for New York Times, and author	
Jay Ingram	Zeta Gamma / University of Alberta	Toronto Star journalist, author, TV Host of several Discovery Channel Canada programs, including Daily Planet	
Sean McManus	Gamma Sigma / Duke University	President of CBS News and CBS Sports	
Michael J. Shaara	Beta Delta / Rutgers University	Pulitzer Prize winner for the novel The Killer Angels, which served as the basis for the movie Gettysburg	

== Military ==
Name	Original chapter	Notability	Ref.
General Jimmie V. Adams	Chi / Auburn	Commander in Chief of US Pacific Air Forces	
Major General Francis William Billado	Alpha / Norwich	Adjutant General, Vermont National Guard	
Rear Admiral J. Scott Burhoe	Eta Lambda / Virginia Tech	Superintendent of the United States Coast Guard Academy	
Captain James M. Burt	Alpha / Norwich	U.S. Army, Medal of Honor and Purple Heart Recipient, World War II	
Brigadier General Kenneth B. Bush	Rho / Illinois	U.S. Army, Distinguished Service Medal recipient, Korean War	
Major General Reginald M. Cram	Alpha / Norwich	Adjutant General, Vermont National Guard	
Major General Grenville M. Dodge	Alpha / Norwich	Union Army officer in the Civil War; railroad executive, helped construct the Transcontinental Railroad	
Colonel Charles Ross Greening	Alpha Omicron / Washington State	Flew in Gen. James Doolittle's first air raid on Tokyo in World War II	
Vice Admiral George Raymond Henderson	Gamma / Maine	USN, a World War II-era officer	
General Robert Neller	Xi / Virginia	Commandant of the Marine Corps	
Lieutenant General Henry P. "Pete" Osman	Zeta Pi / Old Dominion	USMC, Responsible for Toys for Tots on the Eastern Seaboard	
Captain Harl Pease	Zeta / New Hampshire	Army Air Corps Medal of Honor awarded posthumously on December 2, 1942, and Pease AFB named in honor of him	
General John M. Shalikashvili	Gamma Upsilon / Bradley	Former Chairman of the Joint Chiefs of Staff, Supreme Allied Commander Europe	
Colonel Edward Shames	Zeta Pi / Old Dominion	Led troops in American airborne landings in Normandy and in Operation Market Garden as well as Battle of the Bulge, portrayed by Joseph May in the HBO miniseries Band of Brothers	
Major General William Russell Todd	Alpha / Norwich	Former president of Norwich University	
Lieutenant Colonel Benjamin H. Vandervoort	Beta Eta / Washington College	Led American airborne landings in Normandy and in Operation Market Garden in World War II	
Brigadier General Edward Bancroft Williston	Alpha / Norwich	U.S. Army, Medal of Honor recipient, Civil War	

== Politics and government ==
Name	Original chapter	Notability	Ref.
J. Michael Ball	Tau / Florida	Former New Hampshire State Representative – Hillsborough District 9	
Marvin R. Baxter	Beta Upsilon / Fresno State	Current Associate Justice, Supreme Court of California	
Allan Bense	Gamma Rho / Florida State	Former Speaker, Florida House of Representatives	
Mo Brooks	Gamma Sigma / Duke	Alabama Republican	
Ralph Brooks	Gamma Phi / Nebraska Wesleyan	Former governor of Nebraska	
Dennis Cardoza	Eta Tau / Stanislaus State	U.S. Representative for 18th District of California	
Chris Carr	Delta Beta / Georgia	Attorney General of Georgia; Commissioner, Georgia Department of Economic Development	
Theodore Christianson	Alpha Pi / Minnesota	Former governor of Minnesota	
Kirk Cox	Eta Kappa / James Madison	Virginia State Speaker of the House of Representatives	
Robert Cupp	Zeta Kappa / Ohio Northern	Member of the Ohio State Supreme Court	
Carl Curtis	Gamma Phi / Nebraska Wesleyan	Former US Senator and Representative of Nebraska	
Dan Daley	Gamma Rho / Florida State	Commissioner, City of Coral Springs, Florida	
Christopher Dorworth	Tau / Florida	Former Florida Representative for 34th District of Florida	
R. Budd Dwyer	Beta Chi / Pennsylvania	Pennsylvania State Treasurer	
Michael Elston	Gamma Tau / Drake	Acting Secretary of the United States Postal Service board of governors, Assistant United States Attorney, 118th President General of the Sons of the American Revolution	
Ernest W. Gibson Jr.	Alpha / Norwich	Former US Senator, governor of Vermont	
Tony Goolsby	Delta Phi / North Texas	Member of the Texas House of Representatives from Dallas County, 1989–2009	
Harry Hughes	Alpha Psi / Maryland	Former governor of Maryland	
Eugene Keogh	Upsilon / NYU	Former US Representative, Author of Keogh Plan	
Matthew LoPresti	Delta Theta / Toledo	Hawaii State Representative, District 41	
Peter Lund	Zeta Beta / Adrian	Current Michigan Representative for the 36th District and Michigan House Majority Whip	
Warren Magnuson	Alpha Rho / Washington	Former US Senator	
Pete Muldoon	Eta Omicron / Northwestern State	Mayor of Jackson, Wyoming	
William J. Murphy	Zeta Upsilon / Hartford	221st Speaker of the Rhode Island House of Representatives	
Jacob A. Preus	Alpha Pi / Minnesota	Former governor of Minnesota	
David Stras	Delta Psi / Kansas	Judge of the Eighth Circuit Court of Appeals and former Associate Justice of the Minnesota Supreme Court	
Randall Tobias	Alpha Iota / Indiana	Former U.S. Global AIDS coordinator, former CEO and chairman, AT&T Communications, former chairman, president and CEO of Eli Lilly and Company, author	
Michael Villines	Beta Upsilon / Fresno State	Former California State Assemblyman, 29th District and Republican Leader of The House	
Otto Warmbier	Xi / Virginia	Political prisoner detained by North Korea	
Fuller Warren	Tau / Florida	Former governor of Florida	

== Science ==
Name	Original chapter	Notability	Ref.
Daniel T. Barry	Lambda/Cornell	Former NASA Mission Specialist aboard three Space Shuttle missions; appeared on the TV show Survivor: Panama	
Owen Chamberlain	Alpha Theta / Dartmouth	Former Professor of Physics, joined Manhattan Project 1942–1946, winner of 1959 Nobel Prize in Physics	
Charles E. "Buddy" Davis	Chi/Auburn	Apollo space program engineer	
Edward G. Gibson	Alpha Zeta / Rochester	Former NASA astronaut, spent 84 days aboard Skylab	
Donald E. Knuth	Beta Nu/Case Western Reserve University	Computer scientist and Professor Emeritus, Stanford University; recipient of 1974 Turing Award	

== Sports ==
Name	Original chapter	Notability	Ref.
Jon Anik	Delta Omicron / Gettysburg College	Mixed martial arts commentator who currently works for the Ultimate Fighting Championship UFC	
John Bauer	Rho / Illinois	Former offensive lineman for the New York Giants	
Marv Berschet	Rho / Illinois	Former lineman for the Washington Redskins	
Dennis Brown	Alpha Rho / Washington	Professional football player, San Francisco 49ers, Super Bowl Champion: 1995	
Brian Cardinal	Alpha Delta / Purdue	Former Purdue basketball player, Former player in the NBA for the Dallas Mavericks	
Ernie Conwell	Alpha Rho / Washington	Professional football player, New Orleans Saints, Super Bowl Champion: 2000	
Manny Diaz	Gamma Rho / Florida State	Defensive Coordinator for the Penn State Nittany Lions	
Turk Edwards	Alpha Omicron / Washington State	Former NFL player	
Dick Fosbury	Sigma / Oregon State University	1968 Summer Olympics gold medalist in the high jump and creator of the Fosbury Flop	
Ron Fraser	Gamma Rho / Florida State University	University of Miami Head Baseball Coach 1962–1992, two national championships	
Billy Gabor	Alpha Chi / Syracuse University	Former guard/forward for the Syracuse Nationals	
Robert "Lefty" Grove	Beta Eta / Washington College	Major League Baseball pitcher for the Baltimore Orioles, Philadelphia Athletics and Boston Red Sox (1925–1941), and inductee of the National Baseball Hall of Fame (honorary membership)	
Tom Haller	Rho/Illinois	Former MLB catcher for the San Francisco Giants, Los Angeles Dodgers and Detroit Tigers	
Luke Hancock	Eta Chi / George Mason	Current NCAA forward for the Louisville Cardinals and formerly the George Mason Patriots, Most Outstanding Player of the 2013 Final Four	
Tunch Ilkin	Delta Pi / Indiana State	Former NFL athlete and voice of the Pittsburgh Steelers	
Ralph "Shug" Jordan	Chi/Auburn	Former Head Football Coach, Auburn University, 1957 NCAA National Champions	
Scott "Raven" Levy	Alpha Xi / Delaware	Professional wrestler, actor, writer	
Vern Mikkelsen	Beta Kappa / Hamline University	Former basketball player for the Minneapolis Lakers & in the Basketball Hall of Fame	
Mike "The Miz" Mizanin	Gamma Kappa / Miami (OH)	Professional wrestler, actor, reality TV star	
Mark Murphy	Iota/Colgate	Former All-Pro defensive back for the Washington Redskins, 1977–84, former Athletic Director for Northwestern University, President and CEO of the Green Bay Packers	
Johnny Norlander	Beta Kappa / Hamline	Former professional basketball player and Hamline University NCAA Champion Basketball team with Vern Mikkelson	
Jim Parque	Beta Alpha / UCLA	Former pitcher for the Chicago White Sox	
Matt Patricia	Delta/RPI	Head Coach of the Detroit Lions	
Jimmy "Red" Phillips	Chi/Auburn	Three-time NFL Pro-Bowler, All-American wide receiver at Auburn University and member of Auburn's 1957 national championship football team	
Bill Roetzheim	Gamma Rho / Florida State	Florida State University's first Olympian, competing as a gymnast for the US Olympic Team in 1948 and 1952, 1977 inductee of the FSU Sports Hall of Fame	
Alan K. "Al" Saunders	Gamma Xi / San Jose State	Academic All American, Super Bowl Champion, Offensive Coordinator for the St. Louis Rams, former associate head coach & offensive coordinator for the Washington Redskins 2006–2007, former assistant Head Coach and offensive coordinator for the Kansas City Chiefs 2001–2005, 1989-1999, former head coach of the San Diego Chargers 1986–1988	
Mike Wagner	Zeta Psi / Western Illinois	NFL four-time Super Bowl Champion for the Pittsburgh Steelers 1971-1980, two-time Pro-Bowl, First Team All-Pro (1973), Steelers 50th Anniversary All-Time Team - safety	
