= Taha Yasseri =

Physicist and sociologist (born 1984)

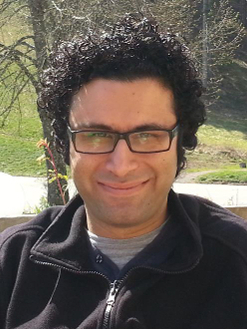
- Yasseri in 2013
- Born: Taha Yasseri; 6 September 1984 (age 42); Tehran, Iran
- Education: Sharif University of Technology (MSc); University of Göttingen (PhD)
- Awards: Laureate Award, IRC, 2022. W. J. M. Mackenzie Book Prize, Political Studies Association, 2017.
- Scientific career
- Fields: Complex systems Computational social science Network science Social data science Human dynamics
- Workplaces: University of Oxford; Oxford Internet Institute; Alan Turing Institute
- Thesis: Nanoscale pattern formation on ion-sputtered surfaces (2010)
- Doctoral advisor: Reiner Kree
- Website: tahayasseri.com

Taha Yasseri (born 6 September 1984) is a British-Iranian physicist and sociologist known for his research on crowdsourcing, collective intelligence and computational social science. He is Workday Chair and a full professor at the School of Social Sciences and Philosophy at Trinity College Dublin, Ireland. Yasseri is one of the leading scholars in computational social science and his research has been widely covered in mainstream media. Yasseri's research investigates complex systems, computational social science, network science, social data science and human dynamics.

== Education ==
Yasseri was educated at Sharif University of Technology and the University of Göttingen where he was awarded a PhD in theoretical physics of complex systems for research supervised by Reiner Kree.

== Research and career ==
Yasseri was a research fellow in humanities and social sciences at Wolfson College, Oxford, a Turing Fellow at the Alan Turing Institute for data science and artificial intelligence, a senior research fellow in computational social science at the Oxford Internet Institute (OII), University of Oxford and a professor of sociology at University College Dublin. He is the inaugural Workday Chair of Technology and Society at Trinity College Dublin. In 2025, he was made a fellow of Trinity College Dublin.

=== Wikipedia ===
Yasseri has studied the statistical trends of systemic bias at Wikipedia introduced by editing conflicts and their resolution. His research examined the counterproductive work behavior of edit warring. Yasseri contended that simple reverts or "undo" operations were not the most significant measure of counterproductive behavior at Wikipedia and relied instead on the statistical measurement of detecting "reverting/reverted pairs" or "mutually reverting edit pairs". Such a "mutually reverting edit pair" is defined where one editor reverts the edit of another editor who then, in sequence, returns to revert the first editor. The results were tabulated for several language versions of Wikipedia. The English Wikipedia's three largest conflict rates belonged to the articles George W. Bush, Anarchism and Muhammad. By comparison, for the German Wikipedia, the three largest conflict rates at the time of the study were for the articles covering Croatia, Scientology and 9/11 conspiracy theories.

In a study published by PLoS ONE in 2012 he estimated the share of contributions to different editions of Wikipedia from different regions of the world. It reported that the proportion of the edits made from North America was 51% for the English Wikipedia, and 25% for the simple English Wikipedia. The Wikimedia Foundation hoped to increase the number of editors in the Global South to 37% by 2015.

=== Machine sociology and bots conflict ===
In a 2017 article titled "Even Good Bots Fight", Yasseri and his colleagues studied interactions between Wikipedia bots. Their work illustrating the unpredictable and somewhat surprising social interactions between bots, ignited a discussion on the topic of machine sociology and the human-like behaviour of systems of semi-autonomous agents such as Wikipedia bots. Yasseri argues that even simple and predictable bots with a common goal and design might show unpredictable emergent behaviour when deployed at mass scale.

=== Social media and politics ===
Yasseri has studied the role of social media in politics. He has used Wikipedia page view statistics and Google search volumes to understand and potentially predict electoral popularity in different countries. He has co-written Political Turbulence; How Social Media Shape Collective Action which was selected among the best politics books of 2016 by The Guardian and was awarded the Political Studies Association book of the year award.

=== TEDx ===
Yasseri is a TEDx Thessaloniki 2019 speaker.
