= List of Ron Baron Investment Conference Entertainment =

Year	Location	Main Performance	Lunch	Lunch	Lunch
2026	Metropolitan Opera House	Maroon 5	Kelly Clarkson	Derek Hough & Julianne Hough	Jerry Seinfeld & Nate Bargatze
2025	Metropolitan Opera House	Pink (singer)	Shania Twain	Sebastian_Maniscalco	Kelli O'Hara & Sutton_Foster
2024	Metropolitan Opera House	Michael Bublé	Carrie Underwood	Cynthia Erivo	Cast members from Suffs the Musical
2023	Metropolitan Opera House	Justin Timberlake	Adam Sandler	John Legend	Cast members from A Beautiful Noise (Musical)
2022	Metropolitan Opera House	Bruno Mars	Miranda Lambert	John Mulaney	Cast members from MJ: The Musical
2021	Cancelled	due to COVID-19			
2020	Cancelled	due to COVID-19			
2019	Metropolitan Opera House	Fleetwood Mac	Mariah Carey	Steve Carell and Stephen Colbert	Misty Copeland
2018	Metropolitan Opera House	Billy Crystal	Mel Brooks	Seth Meyers, Michael Che, Kenan Thompson, and Darrell Hammond	Tina Fey, Amy Poehler, and Kate McKinnon
2017	Metropolitan Opera House	Tim McGraw and Faith Hill	Chris Rock	Idina Menzel	Diana Krall
2016	Metropolitan Opera House	Hugh Jackman	Kenny Loggins	Louis C.K.	Cast members from Hamilton (musical)
2015	Metropolitan Opera House	Alicia Keys	Tony Bennett and Lady Gaga	Steve Martin and Martin Short	Michael Bublé
2014	Metropolitan Opera House	Paul McCartney	Carrie Underwood	Janelle Monáe	Vanessa L. Williams
2013	Metropolitan Opera House	Barbra Streisand	Melissa Etheridge and Joan Osbourne	Counting Crows	Katherine McPhee
2012	Metropolitan Opera House	Celine Dion	Joss Stone	Harry Connick, Jr	Kristin Chenoweth
2011	Metropolitan Opera House	Sting (musician)	James Taylor	Hugh Jackman	Bebe Neuwirth
2010	Metropolitan Opera House	Bon Jovi	John Mellencamp	Diana Ross	Kelli O'Hara
2009	Metropolitan Opera House	Rod Stewart	Glenn Frey	Carole King	Jason Alexander
2008	Metropolitan Opera House	Jerry Seinfeld	Faith Hill	Jessica Simpson	Patti LuPone
2007	Metropolitan Opera House	Bette Midler	Sheryl Crow	Michael Bolton	Kelli O'Hara
2006	Metropolitan Opera House	Billy Crystal	Bernadette Peters	Jersey Boys	Kristin Chenoweth and Kelli O'Hara
2005	Metropolitan Opera House	Elton John	Lionel Richie	Beach Boys	
2004	Avery Fisher Hall	Cher	David Blaine	Blues Brothers	
2003	Waldorf Astoria New York	Paul Simon	Jewel (musician)	Southside Johnny	Cast of Movin' Out (musical)
2002	Grand Hyatt New York	Stevie Wonder	Mona Lisa Sound (Rock String Quartet)		
2001	Grand Hyatt New York	Jerry Seinfeld and Liza Minnelli			
2000	Grand Hyatt New York	Neil Diamond	Mona Lisa Sound (Rock String Quartet)		
1999	Grand Hyatt New York	Billy Joel			
1992	Harmonie Club	Beatlemania			

== See also ==
- Ronald S. Baron
