= Paul R. Andrews =

Canadian–American publishing executive

Paul Revere Andrews (1906–1983) was a Canadian‑born American publishing executive who served as a president and chairman of Prentice-Hall.

== Early life and education ==
Paul R. Andrews was born in 1906 in Canada. He entered Norwich University in Northfield, Vermont, where he double‑majored in English and economics and graduated cum laude with a Bachelor of Science in electrical engineering in 1930.

== Career ==
After a brief period in the U.S. Cavalry Reserve, Andrews joined Prentice-Hall in 1935 as a travelling representative for the college‑textbook division. He became sales manager in 1939 and head of the division in 1947, overseeing its emergence as one of the two largest collegiate publishers in the United States. In 1965, he became the president and chief executive officer of Prentice‑Hall. Under his leadership, Prentice‑Hall introduced high‑speed warehousing that could ship more than 100,000 volumes daily and recorded record revenues. He was elevated to chairman in 1971 and retired in 1976.

Andrews served on the board of Norwich University, as well as on those of the American Textbook Publishers Institute and the National Association of College Stores.

In 1958, Andrews was elected to the board of trustees of Norwich University and later chaired the university's development programme from 1972 to 1982. He also served on the board of American Textbook Publishers Institute and the National Association of College Stores.

== Honours and awards ==
Norwich conferred an honorary Doctor of Literature degree on Andrews in 1966 and later recorded him as a Distinguished Alumnus of the Norwich University Alumni Association. He was also recognised by the university's Partridge Society as a One‑Diamond benefactor for his philanthropic leadership.

In 1975, Andrews endowed the Paul Revere Andrews '30 Scholarship, followed five years later by the Virginia Prentice Ettinger Andrews Scholarship created by his son in honour of Andrews's wife.

In May of 1982, Norwich University dedicated Andrews Hall, an athletics building, in his honor.
