= Trisha Torrey =

American patient activist

- Born: 1951 (age 74–75); Syracuse, NY, USA
- Other names: Patricia Torrey
- Education: Bucknell; Elmira College (in Education)
- Occupation: patient advocate
- Years active: 12+

Trisha Torrey is an American advocate of patient empowerment and patient advocacy.

Torrey became an activist after she was misdiagnosed with a rare form of cancer. While scrutinizing her own medical records, she found an error and avoided unnecessary and potentially damaging and dangerous chemotherapy. She founded the Alliance of Professional Health Advocates in 2009. In 2009 she wrote the book You Bet Your Life which detailed strategies for patients in avoiding mistakes. She advocates that patients empower themselves to get the healthcare they deserve, take steps to stay safe when they access care, especially in hospitals, and that they get a "full picture of a doctor's background", including where they went to medical school and their certifications and length of practice.

== Selected works ==
- Choosing a Career in Health or Patient Advocacy. DiagKNOWsis Media. 2015. ISBN 9780982801451.
- You Bet Your Life!: The 10 Mistakes Every Patient Makes. DiagKNOWsis Media. 2013. ISBN 978-0982801420.
- The Start and Grow Your Own Practice Handbook DiagKNOWsis Media 2017. ISBN 978-0982801499
- The Health Advocate's Basic Marketing Handbook DiagKNOWsis Media 2014. ISBN 978-0982801437
- The Health Advocate's Advanced Marketing Handbook DiagKNOWsis Media 2014.ISBN 978-0982801444
- You Bet Your Life! The Top 10 Reasons You Need a Professional Patient Advocate by Your Side DiagKNOWsis Media 2015 ASIN: B010YDQHOU
