= Ronald S. Baron =

Stock investor and founder of Baron Capital Group Inc.

Ron Baron
- Born: 1943 (age 82–83); Asbury Park, New Jersey, U.S.
- Education: Bucknell University; George Washington University
- Occupations: Founder & chairman of Baron Capital Management
- Spouse: Judy Bernard
- Children: 2

Ronald Stephen Baron (born 1943) is an American mutual fund manager and the founder of Baron Capital, a New York City-based investment management firm. Baron Capital manages the Baron Funds and had approximately US$49 billion in assets under management (AUM) as of December 2025.

As of January 2026, Baron had an estimated net worth of US$6.5 billion according to Forbes.

== Early life ==
Baron grew up in a Jewish family in Asbury Park, New Jersey, one of two children of Morton Baron, an engineer, and his wife Marian. According to the New York Sun, Baron saved $1,000 from jobs including shoveling snow, waiting tables, lifeguarding, and selling ice cream, and grew it to $4,000 through stock investments. He studied chemistry at Bucknell University and attended George Washington University Law School at night on scholarship. His first job out of school was with the United States Patent Office.

== Career ==
Baron worked for several brokerage firms from 1970 to 1982, during which time he developed a focus on investing in small-capitalization companies.

=== Baron Capital Management ===
He founded Baron Capital Management in 1982. The firm pursues a long-term growth equity strategy, typically holding stocks for four to five years and sometimes ten to fifteen years. Baron Capital focuses on sectors driven by broad demographic and societal trends, such as healthcare demand from the aging baby boomer generation.

In 2012, Baron Capital purchased approximately 24 percent of the shares of Manchester United that were offered on the New York Stock Exchange, amounting to a 5.8 percent ownership interest in the club, as only about 10 percent of the total equity had been floated. By September 2014, the firm had raised its stake to 9.2 percent of the entire club, equivalent to 37.8 percent of the publicly traded shares.

In 2014, Baron Capital invested $380 million in Tesla stock. The firm first invested in SpaceX in 2017, when the company was valued at approximately $20 billion. By December 2025, SpaceX had surpassed Tesla as Baron Capital's largest investment, with approximately $10 billion allocated to the company. Baron Capital has also invested in xAI, another company founded by Elon Musk.

==== Concentration and regulatory scrutiny ====
Baron Capital's holdings are notably concentrated. The Baron Partners Fund held approximately 32 percent of its net assets in SpaceX as of December 31, 2025, having previously allowed Tesla to reach 54 percent of the portfolio at its 2022 peak. According to Morningstar, the fund was likely to hold over 60 percent of its net assets in just two companies for the foreseeable future.

In December 2025, Baron Capital launched five actively managed exchange-traded funds (ETFs), including the Baron First Principles ETF (NYSE: RONB), which allocated a significant portion of its holdings to SpaceX. SEC regulations generally limit open-end funds to holding no more than 15 percent of assets in illiquid securities. Baron Capital classified its SpaceX holdings as "less liquid" rather than "illiquid," based on the availability of secondary market trading in SpaceX shares, which allowed the allocation to exceed the 15 percent threshold. The classification drew scrutiny from industry observers, with some arguing that it set a precedent that could undermine existing regulatory frameworks for private securities in ETFs.

== Personal life ==
In 1978, Baron married Judy Bernard in a Jewish ceremony at the Harmonie Club. In 2007, he purchased a property in East Hampton, New York, for $103 million from Adelaide de Menil, heiress to the Schlumberger fortune, which was reported at the time to be the highest price ever paid for a U.S. residential property. Prior to the sale, de Menil relocated several historic buildings from the property to other locations in East Hampton, including six structures moved to serve as the new campus of the East Hampton Town government. Baron subsequently built a 28,000-square-foot (2,600 m^{2}) house on the site, designed by Hart Howerton.

== See also ==
- List of Ron Baron Investment Conference Entertainment
