= Greg Skibiski =

American businessman (born 1973)

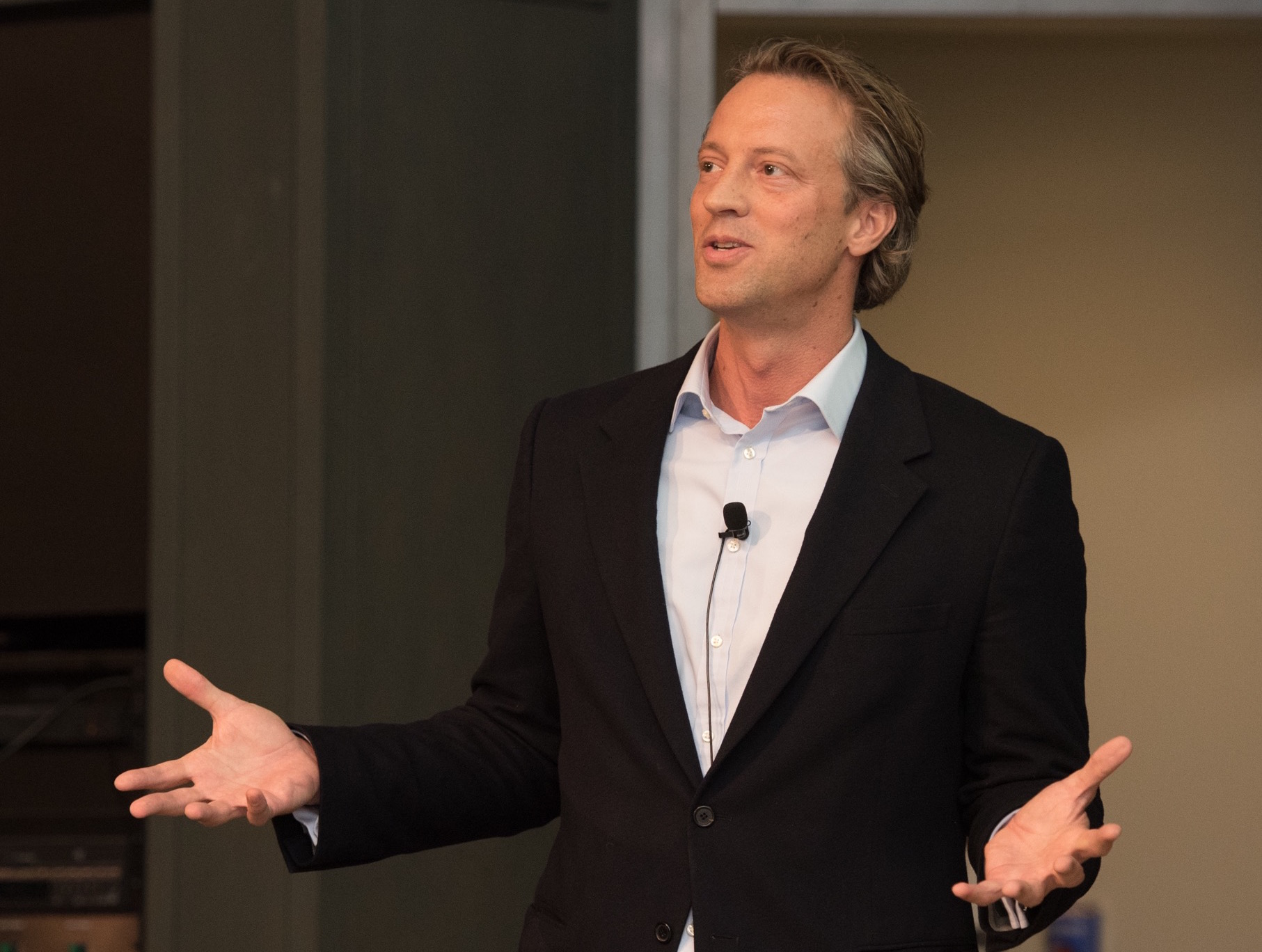
- MIT Business Plan Competition Keynote
- Born: 1973 or 1974 (age 52–53); Northampton, Massachusetts
- Known for: Founder & CEO, Thasos Group Founder & CEO, Sense Networks

Gregory Roman Skibiski (born 1973) is an American entrepreneur. Skibiski founded Thasos Group, an artificial-intelligence-based data analytics firm that uses real-time locations from mobile phones worldwide to provide information for the financial services industry.

Skibiski was also the Founder and former chairman and CEO of Sense Networks, a New York City based company focused on analyzing big data from mobile phones and carrier networks. Skibiski is named lead inventor on three patents for analyzing emerging sensor data streams from mobile phones, culminating in the Macrosense, Citysense, and Cabsense products.

Sense Networks was called "The Next Google" on the cover of Newsweek. Citysense was named by ReadWriteWeb (in The New York Times) as "Top 10 Internet of Things Products of 2009."

In a 2018 profile article on Skibiski, The Wall Street Journal stated that "Thasos is at the vanguard of companies trying to help traders get ahead of stock moves [..] using so-called alternative data."

== Life and career ==
Originally from Northampton, Massachusetts, Skibiski attended the Williston Northampton School from 1985 through 1991. He received his bachelor's degree in Civil Engineering from Bucknell University in 1996 and his MBA from HEC Paris in 2006. Skibiski was also one of the first employees at BackWeb Technologies, a Tel Aviv based internet infrastructure software company that had a successful NASDAQ IPO in 1999.

Several years later, Skibiski approached Alex "Sandy" Pentland (Head of Human Dynamics Research at the MIT Media Lab) with the idea that large amounts of location data being collected by mobile phones and GPS devices could be useful to economists. Technology to do that analysis did not exist at the time.

Skibiski's original theory was that analyzing large amounts of location data from mobile phones and vehicles would provide value to the financial services and retail industries, enabling "an entirely new business model for location-based services" based on monetizing macro trends in spending and sentiment. For retailers, Skibiski hoped to be able to provide information ranging from additional places their customers shop to how far people travel to get to their stores. He further envisioned Web analysis type tools, determining where customers were immediately prior to entering a business locale, essentially a real-world "referring site" concept.

It became apparent that trends in how far shoppers are willing to travel to get to a store like Macy's, Saks Fifth Avenue or Nordstrom could indicate monthly trends in that store's sales. People who worked in a city's financial district would go to work early when the market was booming, but later in the day when markets were down. Plotting San Francisco nightlife patterns on the same graph as the Dow Jones Industrial Average showed that, just before the market peak in July 2008, urban party-goers hit the town at later-than-ever times. Beginning in mid-2006 Skibiski's firm used location data to operate a trading portfolio.

The company was named one of "The 25 Most Intriguing Startups in the World" by Bloomberg Businessweek and won the Emerging Communications Conference "Company to Watch" Award.

== Privacy and data ownership ==
Although there have been doubts as to its practicality, Skibiski has been an advocate for the New Deal on Data, as created and evangelized by Alex "Sandy" Pentland from The MIT Media Lab. "The idea behind the New Deal on Data is based on Old English Common Law saying you have the right to possess something, use it and dispose of it. "So if you’re a company and you're keeping their location data, the end user should own it and have a say over whether it should be destroyed."

The New Deal on Data also provides for the aggregate, anonymous use of location data for the public good, such as predicting Tuberculosis outbreaks in Africa. "If you can find and identify an outbreak just one week earlier, you’re saving thousands of lives."
