= Human dynamics =

Human dynamics refer to a branch of complex systems research in statistical physics such as the movement of crowds and queues and other systems of complex human interactions including statistical modelling of human networks, including interactions over communications networks.

== Academic research ==
Human Dynamics as a branch of statistical physics: Its main goal is to understand human behavior using methods originally developed in statistical physics. Research in this area started to gain momentum in 2005 after the publication of A.-L. Barabási's seminal paper The origin of bursts and heavy tails in human dynamics. that introduced a queuing model that was alleged to be capable of explaining the long tailed distribution of inter event times that naturally occur in human activity.

This paper spurred a burst of activity in this new area leading to not only further theoretical development of the Barabasi model, its experimental verification in several different activities and the beginning of interest in using proxy tools, such as web server logs., cell phone records and even the rate at which registration to a major international conference occurs and the distance and rate people around the globe commute from home to work.

In recent years there has been a growing appetite for access to new data sources that might prove useful in quantifying and understanding human behavior both at the individual and collective scales.

== Other usage ==
The term Human Dynamics or Human Dynamics as Personality Dynamics has also been used to describe a framework for understanding people and is applied in a technique aimed at education and team building. It is pioneered by Sandra Seagal and David Horne. It is a study of the ways in which we process information related to the balance of Physical, Emotional, and Mental components of our experiences. It has been subject to some skepticism, having been described in a Dutch newspaper as a personality course with esoteric (occult) roots.

== See also ==
Sense Networks
