= Douglas Noll =

American bioengineer

Douglas C. Noll is an American bioengineer currently the Ann and Robert H. Lurie Professor of Bioengineering at University of Michigan, where he also is professor of radiology and co-director of the Functional MRI Laboratory.

He graduated from Bucknell University (B.S., 1985) and did graduate work at Stanford University, where he earned an M.S. (1986) and Ph.D. (1991) in electrical engineering.

Prior to working at the University of Michigan, he worked at Carnegie Mellon University and University of Pittsburgh.

He is an Elected Fellow of the American Institute for Medical and Biological Engineering, International Society of Magnetic Resonance in Medicine and Biomedical Engineering Society.
