= Bonnie Spring =

American clinical health psychologist

Bonnie Spring is an American clinical health psychologist and academic. She is a professor of preventive medicine, psychology, and psychiatry at the Northwestern University Feinberg School of Medicine and directs the Institute for Public Health and Medicine's Center for Behavior and Health. She has also held leadership roles in behavioral medicine, cancer prevention, and clinical and translational science. Her research has focused on health behavior change, including smoking cessation, obesity, diet, physical activity, and the integration of multiple health behaviors in prevention and treatment.

== Education and early career ==
Spring studied psychology at Bucknell University and later completed doctoral training in psychology. She went on to build a career in clinical health psychology and behavioral medicine, with appointments at several academic medical institutions before joining Northwestern University.

== Academic career ==
Spring has held faculty appointments in preventive medicine, psychology, and psychiatry, and has worked at the intersection of behavioral science and public health. At Northwestern University Feinberg School of Medicine, she became director of behavioral medicine and later directed the Center for Behavior and Health within the Institute for Public Health and Medicine. She also served as co-leader for cancer prevention at the Robert H. Lurie Comprehensive Cancer Center and held a leadership role in team science at the Northwestern University Clinical and Translational Sciences Institute.

Her research has emphasized the prevention and treatment of chronic disease through behavior change, particularly in relation to smoking, obesity, diet, and physical inactivity. She has also worked on technology-assisted interventions and evidence-based behavioral practice.

== Selected works ==
Among Spring's best-known publications are works on multiple health behavior change and evidence-based behavioral practice, including:

- Multiple health behaviours: overview and implications (2012)
- Evidence Based Behavioral Practice (2008)
- The Make Better Choices 2 Randomized Controlled Trial (2018)
- An Adaptive Behavioral Intervention for Weight Loss Management: A Randomized Clinical Trial (2024)

== Honors and recognition ==
In 2016, Spring received an American Psychological Association Presidential Citation for advancing scientific understanding of the relationship between behavior and physical health, as well as for leadership in health psychology and technology-based practice.

She also received the 2021 Distinguished Scientist Award from the Society of Behavioral Medicine, which described the honor as the organization's highest annual award.
