= Gramsci Melodic =

American alternative rock band

Gramsci Melodic was an alternative rock band based in Pittsburgh, Pennsylvania.

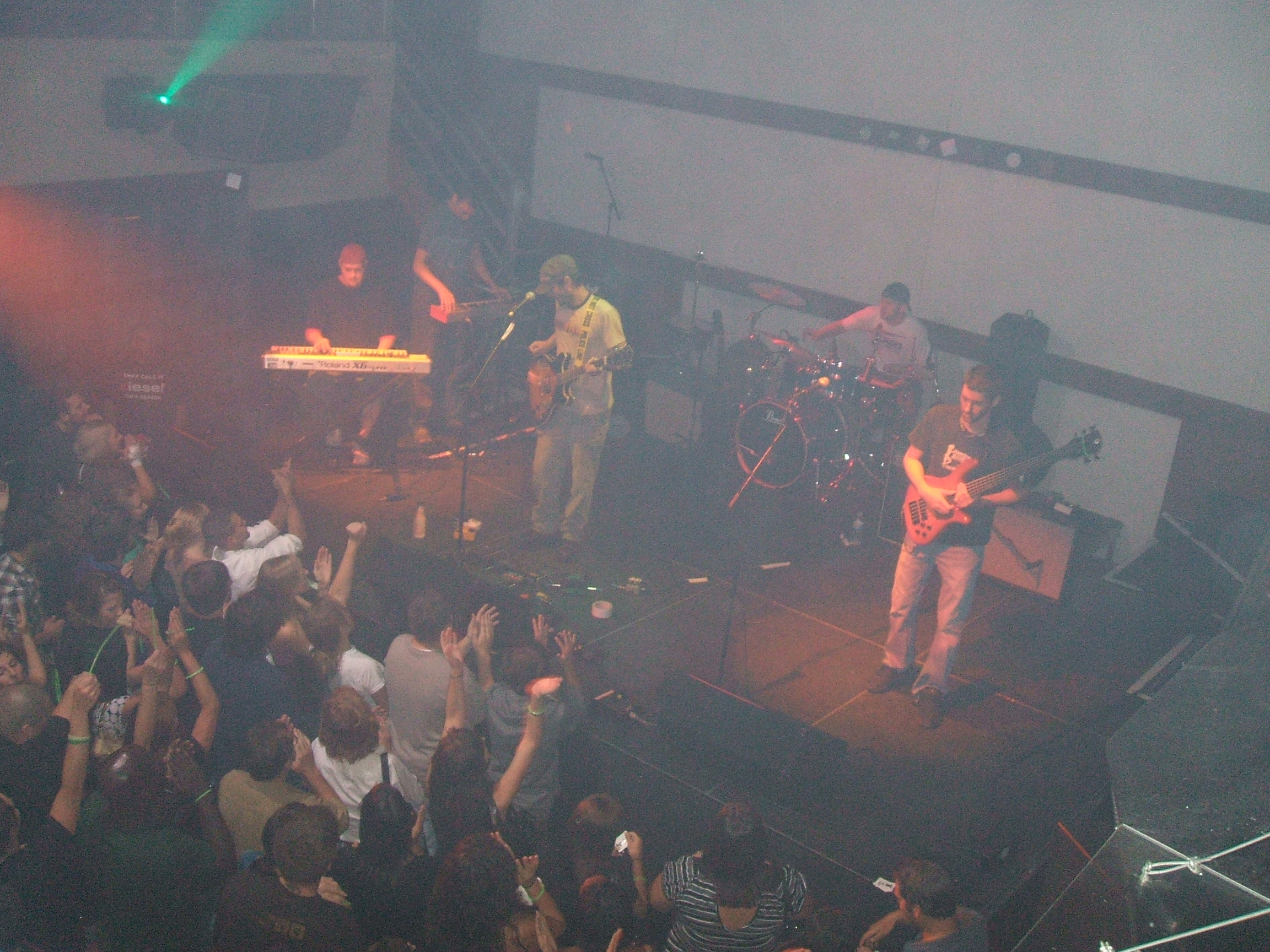
Gramsci Melodic performing at Diesel (Pittsburgh, PA) 9-13-2008

The band was started in 2006 by singer/guitarist Martin Rubeo. Other members include Joel York (synthesizers/programming), Sean Rayl (drums), Greg Haduch (keyboards), and Tony Willoe (bass/vocals). In 2009, Eric Granata started to perform at some shows with the band, playing guitar, synths, and percussion. He became a full time member shortly after.

The band won the 2008 Joker Productions Rock Off and recorded its first full-length album with Grammy Award winning producers at Audible Images. The band featured guitar, bass, piano, drums, and synthesizers. The band was ranked as Pittsburgh's #2 Best Underground Band and #3 Best Rock Band by the Pittsburgh City Paper in 2008. In 2009, Gramsci Melodic was named #3 Best Rock Band by the Pittsburgh City Paper.

The band released its self-titled, debut album in June, 2009. Collected, an album of previously unreleased material and live tracks, was released in 2021.

Their music has been described as "simple and upbeat rock," "driving synth rock," "'70s funk" with "eclectronica," and similar to Fountains of Wayne, They Might Be Giants, and Weezer.

Gramsci Melodic was known to travel with its own mascot, a dancing character with an oversized green head.

== See also ==
- List of people from Pittsburgh
- List of synthpop artists
