= Sense Networks =

Big data companies

Sense Networks, Inc.
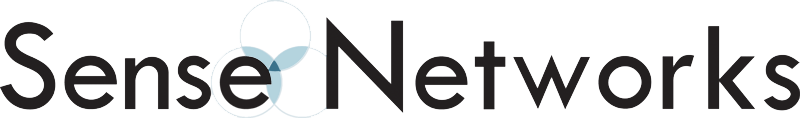
- Company type: Private (venture backed)
- Founded: New York City, New York, USA
- Headquarters: New York City, New York, United States
- Area served: Worldwide
- Founder: Greg Skibiski
- Key people: Alex Pentland (CPO); Tony Jebara (Chief Scientist); Christine Lemke (COO); Mikki Nasch (EVP BD)
- Website: www.sensenetworks.com
- Launched: February 2006
- Current status: Active

Sense Networks is a New York City based company with a focus on applications that analyze big data from mobile phones, carrier networks, and taxicabs, particularly by using machine learning technology to make sense of large amounts of location (latitude/longitude) data.

In 2009, Sense was named one of "The 25 Most Intriguing Startups in the World" by Bloomberg Businessweek and was called "The Next Google" on the cover of Newsweek.

In 2014, Sense Networks was acquired by YP, "the local search and advertising company owned by Cerberus Capital Management and AT&T." It was subsequently sold off to Verve in 2017

== History ==
Sense Networks was founded by Greg Skibiski in February 2006 (2003?) near his home in Northampton, Massachusetts. After establishing an office in NoHo, New York City near Silicon Alley, Skibiski recruited Alex Pentland, Director of Human Dynamics Research and former Academic Head of the MIT Media Lab, Tony Jebara, Associate Professor and Head of the Machine Learning Laboratory at Columbia University, and Christine Lemke, who would later become co-founders.

Sense Networks investors include Intel Capital, Javelin Venture Partners, and Kenan Altunis.

Founder Greg Skibiski was pushed out by lead investor Intel Capital in November 2009 following the company's B round of financing. During the same week, the company won the Emerging Communications Conference "Company to Watch" Award.

The company has three published patent applications for analyzing sensor data streams: System and Method of Performing Location Analytics (US 20090307263), Comparing Spatial-Temporal Trails in Location Analytics (US 20100079336), and Anomaly Detection in Sensor Analytics (US 20100082301).

The company was acquired by the Yellow Pages in 2014. This is a marketing conglomerate under AT&T and Cerberus Capital Management.

== Products and services ==
The Citysense consumer application that shows hotspots of human activity in real-time from mobile phone location and taxicab GPS data was named by ReadWriteWeb (in The New York Times) as "Top 10 Internet of Things Products of 2009".

The Cabsense consumer application that shows the best place to catch a New York City taxicab based on GPS data from the vehicle was launched in March 2010.

The Macrosense platform is for mobile application providers and mobile phone carriers to analyze billions of customer location data points for predictive analytics in advertising and churn management applications.

== Privacy and data ownership ==
The company allows users to opt-out of their service through their website, and users may monitor their profile through their application. The company does not collect identifiable data (such as phone numbers or names); it collects data received from cellphone to construct anonymous profiles of consumers. This anonymous data/profiles may then be sold to third parties.

The company's privacy and data ownership policies are based on The New Deal on Data, as advocated by Alex "Sandy" Pentland, head of the Human Dynamics group at MIT.

== See also ==
- Geosocial Networking
- Location-based service
- Location awareness
