= List of HEC Paris people =

This is a list of HEC Paris (France) notable alumni. They are represented by HEC Alumni.

== Politics ==
=== International Organization ===
- Pascal Lamy (class of 1969), Director General of the World Trade Organization
- Dominique Strauss-Kahn (class of 1971), Managing Director of the International Monetary Fund
- Bertrand Badré (class of 1989), Chief Financial Officer of the World Bank

=== Heads of States and Governments ===
- Francisco Madero, President of Mexico
- Paul Reynaud (class of 1898), Prime Minister of France
- Son Sann (class of 1933), Prime Minister of Cambodia
- Édith Cresson (class of 1957), Prime Minister of France
- Kabiné Komara, Prime Minister of Guinea
- François Hollande (class of 1975), President of France
- Abdoul Mbaye (class of 1976), Prime Minister of Senegal
- Bozidar Djelic (class of 1987), Deputy Prime Minister of Serbia
- Milojko Spajić (MBA), Prime Minister of Montenegro

=== Ministers and Secretaries of State ===
- Maurice Herzog (class of 1944), French Secretary of State of Youth and Sports
- Hervé de Charette (class of 1960), French Minister of Foreign Affairs
- François d'Aubert (class of 1966), French Minister of Research
- Jean-Louis Borloo (class of 1976), French Minister of Ecology
- Serge Lepeltier (class of 1976), French Minister of Ecology
- Éric Woerth (class of 1981), French Minister of Budget
- Valérie Pécresse (class of 1988), French Minister of Higher Education
- Rachida Dati, French Minister of Justice
- Benjamin Griveaux (class of 2001), French Secretary of State of the Economy

=== Other political figures ===
- Bertrand Denis (class of 1923), French MP
- Pierre Perroy (class of 1928), French MP
- Joseph Fontanet (class of 1940), French MP
- Xavier de Villepin (class of 1949), French MP
- Georges Frêche (class of 1961), Mayor of Montpellier, French MP
- Pierre Brochand (class of 1962), Director of the DGSE
- Bernard Brochand (class of 1962), Mayor of Cannes, French MP
- Jacques Cheminade (class of 1963), French political activist and presidential candidate
- Jean-Claude Guibal (class of 1963), French MP
- Danielle Bousquet (class of 1967), French MP
- Gilles Carrez (class of 1972), French MP
- Aziz Mekouar (class of 1974), Ambassador of Morocco, Chairman of the Food and Agriculture Organization
- François Asselineau (class of 1980), General inspector of finances and founder of UPR
- Michel Grall (class of 1984), French MP
- Nicolas Dufourcq (class of 1984), Director of the Public Bank of Investment
- Dominique Dord (class of 1985), French MP
- Pablo Kleinman (class of 2003), American entrepreneur, journalist and Republican Party official
- Frances Lanitou Ambassador of the Republic of Cyprus to countries including Belgium, Bosnia and Herzegovina, China, Hungary, the Grand Duchy of Luxembourg, Moldova and the Netherlands.
- Florian Philippot (class of 2005), European MP and vice president of the National Front (FN)
- Nicolas Princen (class 2007), advisor of the French President Nicolas Sarkozy
- Vincent Chauvet (class of 2011), French political activist
- Jean-Christophe, Prince Napoleon (class of 2011), Head of the House of Bonaparte

== Business ==
- Alain Taravella, Billionaire and founder of Altarea SCA
- Serge Dassault, Billionaire and founder of Dassault Group
- Georges Schwob d'Héricourt (class of 1882), President of the SFCO
- Pierre Bellon (class of 1954), Billionaire and Chairman of Sodexo
- Louis Gallois (class of 1966), CEO of EADS
- Henri Proglio (class of 1971), CEO of Électricité de France
- Baudouin Prot (class of 1972), CEO of BNP Paribas
- Michel de Rosen (class of 1974), CEO of Eutelsat
- Christophe Cuvillier (class of 1976), CEO of Unibail Rodamco
- Henri de Castries (class of 1976), CEO of AXA
- Denis Kessler (class of 1976), CEO of Scor
- Jean-Dominique Sénard (class of 1976), CEO of Michelin
- Jean-Paul Agon (class of 1978), CEO of L'Oréal
- Rémy Pflimlin (class of 1978), CEO of France Télévisions from 2010 to 2015
- Pierre Danon (class of 1980), Chairman of Volia
- Mercedes Erra (class of 1981), CEO of Havas Worldwide
- Hubert Joly (class of 1981), CEO of Best Buy
- Stéphane Richard (class of 1981), CEO of Orange
- Gilles Schnepp (class of 1981), CEO of Legrand
- Alain Weill (class of 1984), CEO of NextRadioTV
- Valérie Hermann (class of 1985), former CEO of Yves Saint Laurent and Reed Krakoff
- François-Henri Pinault (class of 1985), CEO of Kering
- Jean Riachi (class of 1985), founder and CEO of FFA Private Bank
- Jean-Pierre Aguilar (class of 1986), CEO of Capital Fund Management
- Emmanuel Faber (class of 1986), CEO of Danone
- Frédéric Lemoine (class of 1986), CEO of Wendel
- François Pérol (class of 1986), CEO of BPCE
- Pascal Soriot (class of 1986), CEO of AstraZeneca
- Dan Serfaty (class of 1987), CEO of Viadeo
- Eric Janvier (class of 1989), CEO of Schlumberger Business Consulting
- Fréderic Jousset (class of 1992), CEO of Webhelp
- Loïc Le Meur (class of 1996), serial entrepreneur
- Greg Skibiski (class of 2006), CEO of Sense Networks
- Fidji Simo (class of 2008), CEO of AGI Deployment at OpenAI
- Éric Hazan (class 1988), Business executive, professor of Strategy and Business Policy, previous Partner at McKinsey & Company

== Academics ==
- Michel Crozier (class of 1943), sociologist
- Pierre Rosanvallon (class of 1969), historian
- Jean-Louis Scaringella (class of 1970), Dean of ESCP Europe
- Michèle Pujol (class of 1973), economist
- Bernard Ramanantsoa (class of 1976), Dean of HEC Paris
- Loïc Wacquant (class of 1981), sociologist
- Éric Pichet (class of 1985), economist and professor at KEDGE
- Frédéric Lordon (class of 1987), economist
- Bertrand Moingeon (class of 1991), former professor at HEC Paris and former visiting professor Harvard Business School, now professor and Vice Dean for Executive Education at ESCP Business School
- Enrique Cabrero Mendoza (class of 2001), professor at CIDE Mexico and general director CONACYT
- Itzhak Gilboa, AXA Professor of Economics and Decision Science
- Olivier Sibony (class of 1988), Professor of Strategy and Business Policy, previous Partner at McKinsey & Company

== Media ==
- Claire Chazal (class of 1978), journalist on TF1
- Érik Izraelewicz (class of 1976), director of Le Monde
- Odette Kahn (class of 1946), editor
- Florence Noiville (class of 1984), journalist
- Philippe Ragueneau (class of 1939), journalist
- Dominique Tchimbakala, news anchor (class of 2021), journalist

== Writers and artists ==
- Paul Vialar (class of 1920), writer
- Jacques Rouxel (class of 1949), film animator
- Bernard Fresson (class of 1953), actor
- Catherine Robbe-Grillet (class of 1953), writer and photographer
- François Brune (class of 1964), writer
- Jean-François Stévenin (class of 1967), actor
- Bernard Le Nail (class of 1970), writer
- Francis Cholle, writer
- Flore Vasseur, film director, screenwriter, film producer, novelist, journalist and entrepreneur.

== Sports ==
- Émile Lesieur (class of 1908), rugby player
- Jacques Georges (class of 1938), president of UEFA
- Alain Cayzac (class of 1963), president of PSG Football Club
- Perrine Pelen (class of 1986), world ski champion
- Hubert Gardas (class of 1990), Olympic fence champion
- Sylvain Marconnet (class of 2011), rugby player

== Military ==
- Roland Garros (class of 1908), fighter pilot during WWI

== See also ==
- HEC Paris
- HEC Alumni
- Grandes Écoles
- Education in France
