= Hieronimus =

Hieronimus is a surname. Notable people with the surname include:

- Carl Hieronimus Gustmeyer (1701–1756), Danish merchant
- Nicolas Hieronimus (born 1964), French businessman
- Robert Richard Hieronimus (born 1943), American educator, artist, author, and activist
