= Jean-Louis Scaringella =

French professor and politician

Jean-Louis Scaringella, (born 16 July 1948, in Grenoble, Isère, France) is a graduate of the HEC Paris and Harvard Business School. In November 1999 he became the Dean of, and Professor of International Business at, the European School of Management ESCP-EAP.

He is currently Deputy Director General of the CCIP, responsible for Research, Forecasting and Innovation. As CEO of the ESCP-EAP, he facilitated the merger of it, and HEC jeunes filles; two prestigious French 'Grandes Ecoles' - the new group is an institution dedicated to world business studies.

Scaringella is also a board member of the EFMD (European Foundation for Management Development), a board member of the Diplomatic and Strategic Studies Centre (CEDS), a member of the editorial board of the European Management Journal and the Expansion Management Review, an associate professor at the Panthéon-Assas University, and a Defence Advisor to the Secretary General of National Defence.

== Degrees ==
- Doctorate in Economics Sorbonne, Paris (1970)
- Harvard Business School (1972)
- Doctorate in Law.

== Career ==
- 1970 - 1978: Professor of Finance at the École des Hautes Études Commerciales;
- 1978 - 1983: Director of the Institut Supérieur des affaires (HEC MBA);
- 1983 - 1984: Deputy Director of Education of the Chamber of Commerce and Industry of Paris (CCIP);
- 1984 - 1989: Director of Communications of the CCIP;
- 1989 - 1992: Director of the École des Hautes Études Commerciales (HEC);
- 1993 - 1999: Director General, Centre for Development Affairs;
- 1999 - 2006: Director General of ESCP-EAP (Paris, London, Madrid, Berlin, Turin);
- Since 2006: Deputy Director General of the CCIP.

== Publications ==
- The Defence Industries in Europe - Economica 1998 ISBN 2-7178-3572-5
- RH : les meilleures pratiques des entreprises du Cac 40 - Editions d'Organisation 2003 ISBN 2-7081-2874-4
- L'Art du management de l'information (The Art of Information Management) - (en coll., 2007)
- L'art de la dirigeance (en coll., 2007)
- Stratégies d’Internationalisation Dunod 1997
- Handbook of Top Management Teams (editor) - Palgrave Macmillan 2010 ISBN 978-0-230-21859-8

== Decorations ==
- Officer of the Legion of Honor;
- Commandeur de l' ordre national du Mérite (Commander of the National Order of Merit);
- Commandeur des Palmes académiques (Commander of the Academic Palms);
- Officer of the Order of Merit of the Federal Republic of Germany (Officer of the Order of Merit of the Federal Republic of Germany);
- Fellow of the Royal Society of Arts;
- Commandeur de l'Ordre du Mérite Culturel de la Bolivie (Commander of the Order of Cultural Merit of Bolivia);
- Officier de l'Ordre National du Mérite du Sénégal (Officer of the Order of Merit of Senegal);
- Chevalier de l'Ordre National du Burkina Faso.

== See also ==
- ESCP-EAP European School of Management
