= Francis Cholle =

French-American author

- Born: Francis P. Cholle; 1965 (age 60–61); Paris, France
- Education: HEC Paris
- Occupations: Author and management consultant
- Years active: 1992–present
- Notable work: L'intelligence intuitive: Pour réussir autrement (2007); The Intuitive Compass (2011); Squircle: A New Way to Think for a New World (2020)
- Website: francischolle.com

Francis P. Cholle (born 1965) is a French-American author and management consultant. He is the founder and chief executive of The Human Company, a New York City-based business consultancy, as well as the founder of Squircle Academy and the Know Better World Foundation.

== Early life and education ==
Cholle was born in 1965 in Paris to a family of scientists and grew up in the southeastern Parisian suburb of Saint-Maur-des-Fossés. He earned a master's degree in science of management from HEC Paris.

== Career ==
=== Early career ===
Cholle began his career in art book publishing, taking on a leadership role at the Paris-based art publisher Éditions Hazan. He moved to New York City at the age of 28 and obtained French-American dual citizenship.

Cholle has taught at HEC Paris, Fashion Institute of Technology, Wharton School, and Columbia Business School.

=== Writing ===
In 2007, Cholle's first book L'intelligence intuitive: Pour réussir autrement was published in France by Éditions d'Organisation/Eyrolles with support from the Centre national du livre. The book argued that the information age was giving way to an age of intuition and that companies needed to mobilize creativity by integrating intuition into management.

His second book, The Intuitive Compass: Why the Best Decisions Balance Reason and Instinct, was published in English in 2011 by Jossey-Bass, an imprint of Wiley. The book introduced a four-quadrant model for combining rational and instinctual thinking, structured around poles of "reason" and "instinct" and of "play" and "results", and drew on case studies of Hermès, Google, and Virgin America.

Cholle's third book Squircle: A New Way to Think for a New World, was published in 2020. The book argues that humans tend to dismiss non-rational cognitive processes such as intuition, emotion, sensation, inspiration, and aspiration, and proposes the Squircle model, in which the "square" of reason and the "circle" of intuition operate in synergy. The book appeared on the USA Today and Wall Street Journal's bestseller lists.

== Books ==
- Cholle, Francis (2007). L'intelligence intuitive: Pour réussir autrement. Éditions d'Organisation. ISBN 978-2-7081-3647-2.
- Cholle, Francis (2011). The Intuitive Compass: Why the Best Decisions Balance Reason and Instinct. Jossey-Bass. ISBN 978-1-118-07754-2.
- Cholle, Francis P. (2020). Squircle: A New Way to Think for a New World. Squircle Academy. ISBN 978-1-7351384-0-4.
