= Bertrand Moingeon =

French academic

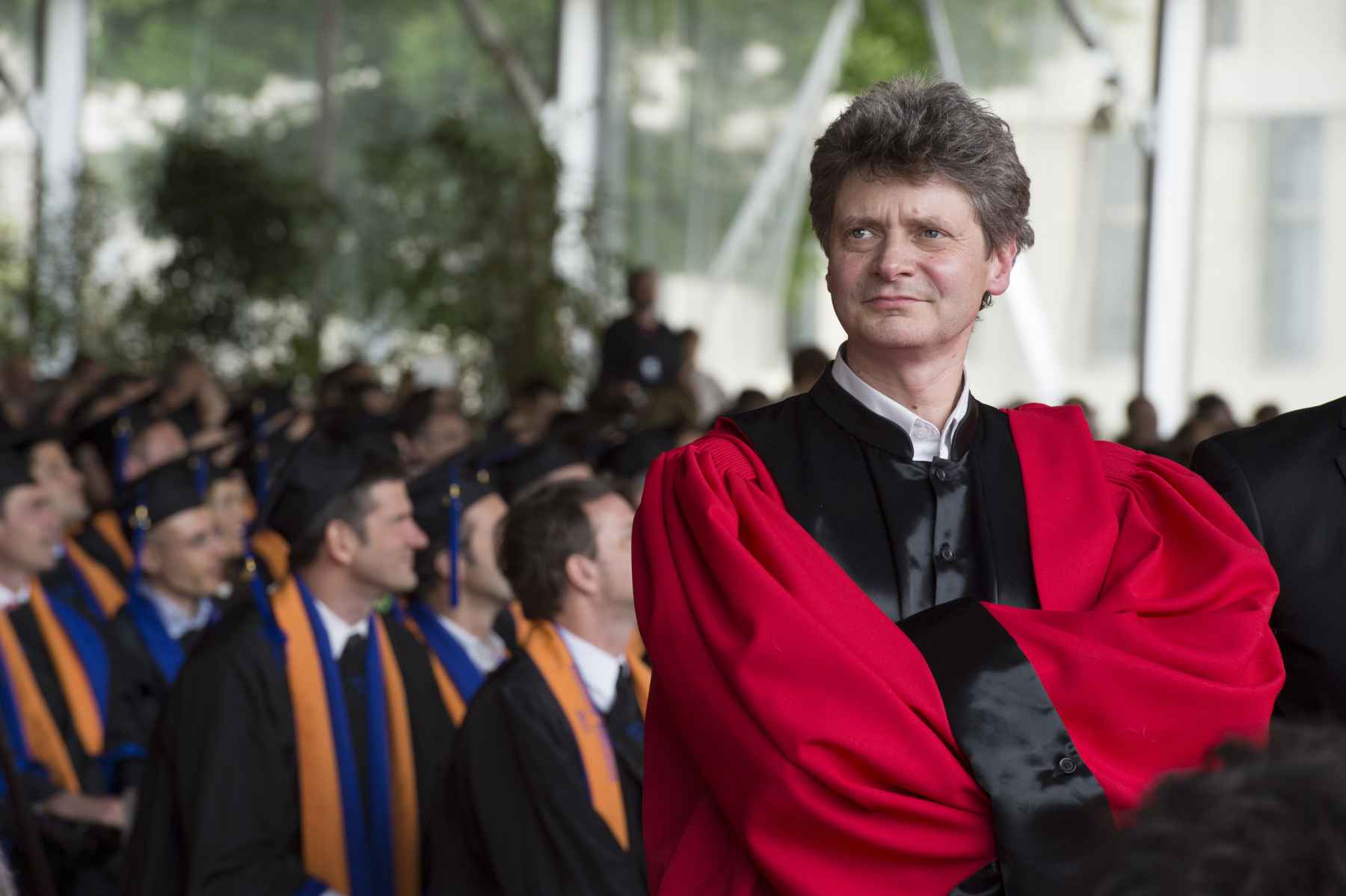
Bertrand Moingeon

Bertrand Moingeon (born August 24, 1964, died October 2020), was Professor of Strategic Management is Executive Vice-President and Dean for Executive Education and Corporate Initiatives at ESCP Business School and formerly at HEC Paris.

He had a dual career in academia and in management. Author of over one hundred publications, he was a visiting professor at Harvard Business School, as well as a member of HEC Paris' Executive Board for 17 years.

Elected by his peers four times running to lead the School’s Executive Education unit as Associate Dean, he was appointed Deputy Dean of HEC Paris in 2007. Under his leadership, from 1998 to 2013, the turnover of HEC Executive Education increased significantly and HEC Paris experienced an expanded internationally (subsidiary in China, dedicated campus in Qatar, etc.). HEC Paris was ranked number one for Executive Education by the Financial Times in 2011, 2013 and 2014.

As one of the co-founders of Trium Global Executive MBA in 2001, a joint degree run in alliance with the London School of Economics and Political Science, New York University Stern School of Business and HEC Paris, he served as board member and chairman of the board. Trium tops FT Executive MBA programs ranking in 2014.

Professor Moingeon served as Executive Director of the HEC Indian Ocean, Eastern and Southern Africa Office.

He also headed the HEC Europe Institute which he founded with Noëlle Lenoir, former French Minister for European Affairs and Chair of the Europe Institute.

His most recent projects and publications deal with organizational learning, stakeholders experience management and strategic innovation, expanded internationallyincluding work on how such innovations may contribute to poverty alleviation. For reference, see his articles on Social Business Models with Muhammad Yunus (Founder of Grameen Bank and Nobel Peace Prize winner) and Laurence Lehmann-Ortega.

He was awarded the honorable distinctions of ‘Chevalier dans l’Ordre national de la Légion d'Honneur’ (Knight in the National Order of the Legion of Honour), ‘Chevalier dans l’Ordre National du Mérite’ (Knight in the National Order of Merit) as well as ‘Chevalier dans l’Ordre des Palmes Académiques’ (Knight in the Order of Academic Palms) for his academic and managerial achievements. He also serves as expert counsel for several governing authorities (e.g. administrator for companies, government committees and editorial boards).

== Education ==
Professor Moingeon holds a postgraduate diploma in Strategy and Management (HEC’s Doctoral Program), a Ph.D. in Sociology and a postdoctoral diploma in Management. He has an accreditation to supervise research in management science (1993) and is a graduate of the International Teachers Program (1992).

== Interests ==
For the past 25 years he has been trying to grasp the explanatory factors underlying the functioning of organizations. This was already the rationale behind his Ph.D. in Sociology on Pierre Bourdieu’s contribution to understanding organizational management. Beyond the mere formulation of descriptive theories, he is particularly interested in coming up with ‘actionable’ schemes. In the tradition of publications such as Chris Argyris, with whom he collaborated at Harvard, His research addressed ‘when managers are aware of their own share of responsibility in situations which they happen to lament’. This theme appears in his publications on the management of change, strategic management, corporate identity and organizational learning. He has also carried out numerous consulting and training missions on these same themes both in France and abroad.

Professor Moingeon co-authored Strategor, a strategic management textbook published in several language (translated into 4 languages). He has also published several books including Organizational Learning and Competitive Advantage (with Amy Edmondson, Professor at the Harvard Business School, Sage, 1996) and Corporate and Organizational Identities (with Guillaume Soenen, Routledge, 2002). Finally, he has published articles in reviews and periodicals such as Management Learning, Long Range Planning, European Management Journal and the European Journal of Marketing.

== Bibliography ==
- Edmondson, A., Moingeon, B., Bai, G. and J.F. Harvey. "Building Smart Neighborhoods at Bouygues" Harvard Business School Case 617-007, August 2016.
- Bayle-Cordier, J., Mirvis, P. and B. Moingeon (2015), "Projecting Different Identities: A Longitudinal Study of the “Whipsaw” Effects of Changing Leadership Discourse About the Triple Bottom Line", The Journal of Applied Behavioral Science, Vol. 51(3) 336–374.
- Moingeon, B. and L. Lehmann-Ortega (2013), “Social business, a new place for businesses to innovate”, in Barou, Y et al. (eds), The European social model, Jouve, des ilôts de résistance.
- Moingeon, B and L. Lehmann-Ortega (2013), « Le social business, nouveau lieu d’innovation pour les entreprises », in Barou, Y et al. (eds), Le modèle social européen, Jouve, des ilôts de résistance.
- Yunus, M., Moingeon, B. and L. Lehmann-Ortega (2010), "Building Social Business Models: Lessons from the Grameen Experience”, April–June, vol 43, n°2-3, Long Range Planning, pp. 308–325
- Moingeon, B. and L. Lehmann-Ortega (2010), "Creation and Implementation of a New Business Model: a disarming case study", M@n@gement, 13: 4, 266-297.
- Moingeon, B. and L. Lehmann-Ortega (2010), « Genèse et Déploiement d’un Nouveau Business Model : l’Etude d’un Cas Désarmant », M@n@gement, 13: 4, 266-297.
- Moingeon, B. and E. Lefranc (2010), « Bicad University. Communauté de pratique et partage du savoir », in Chevalier F. (sous la dir.), Pratiques de GRH dans les pays francophones, Paris, Vuibert, pp. 67–71.
- Yunus, M., Lehmann-Ortega, L. and B. Moingeon (2010), « Réinventer l’entreprise grâce au social business », in Le Roux J.M. and B. Ramanantsoa, Réinventer l’entreprise. Repères pour une crise qui va durer, Paris, Pearson.
- Moingeon, B. and E. Lefranc (2010), « Le management de l’expérience, nouvel enjeu pour l’entreprise », in Le Roux J.M. and B. Ramanantsoa, Réinventer l’entreprise. Repères pour une crise qui va durer, Paris, Pearson.
- Moingeon, B., Lumineau, F. and A. Perrin (2009), "Managing Knowledge Across Boundaries: A Learning Mix Perspective", in Sparrow, P.R. (ed.) Handbook of International HR Research: Integrating People, Process and Context. Oxford: Blackwell.
- Moingeon, B. and L. Lehmann-Ortega (2008), Valtis, une innovation stratégique désarmante, Centrale des Cas et Moyens Pédagogiques.
- Edmondson, A., Moingeon, B., Dessain, V. and A. Damgaard Jensen (2008), Global Knowledge Management at Danone, n°9-608-107, Harvard Business School Publishing, Cambridge.
- Moingeon, B. and L. Lehmann-Ortega (2007), "Enjeux et opportunités de l’executive education", Revue Française de Gestion, n°178-179, November-Décember, pp107–116.
- Moingeon, B., Quélin, B., Dalsace, F. and F. Lumineau (2006) "Inter-Organizational Communities of Practice: Specificities and Stakes", HEC Working Paper, n°857, 18 p.
- Moingeon, B. and L. Lehmann-Ortega (2006), "Strategic Innovation : How to Grow in Mature Markets", European Business Forum, 24, Printemps, pp. 50–54.
- Moingeon, B. and A. Perrin (2006), "Knowledge Management : A Learning Mix Perspective", HEC Working Paper, n°836, 26 p.
- Moingeon, B. and B. Ramanantsoa (2005), "La confiance, un atout essentiel pour les entreprises", Les Echos : L’art du Management, 8 décembre.
- Mathieu, E. and B. Moingeon (2005), "Compétitivité de la France : classements et analyses", Les Echos : L’art du Management, 10 novembre.
- Moingeon, B. and L. Lehmann-Ortega (2005), "Le business model au service de la performance", Les Echos : L’art du Management, 13octobre, pp. 8–9.
- Strategor (ouvrage collectif) (2005), Stratégie, structure, décision, identité. Politique générale de l'entreprise, Paris, Dunod.
- Edmondson, A. and B. Moingeon (2004), "From Organizational Learning to the Learning Organization" in Grey, C. et E. Antonacopoulou (eds), Essential Readings in Management Learning, London, Sage Publications; also published in Management Learning, Vol. 29 (1), March 1998, 5-20 and as a Working Paper, Harvard Business School, Division of Research, n°97-067, 1997; part of the “spring selection of HBS working papers”).
- Moingeon, B. (2004), "Le Learning Mix : un modèle pour l’entreprise apprenante", Les Echos : L’art du Management, 18 novembre, p. 7.
- Moingeon, B. and L. Lehmann-Ortega (2004), "L’innovation : un gisement de croissance", Les Echos : L’art du Management, 23 septembre, pp. 2–3.
- Moingeon, B. (2004), La formation continue en gestion: état des lieux et perspectives, FNEGE, Paris.
- Moingeon, B. (2003), "Formation des dirigeants et recherche en gestion : un dialogue productif", Humanisme et Entreprise, 262, pp. 73–82.
- Moingeon, B. (ed.) (2003), Peut-on former les dirigeants ? L’apport de la recherche, L’Harmattan, Paris.
- Moingeon, B. (2003), "Gestion des connaissances et entreprise apprenante: apprendre à gérer le learning mix", in Moingeon, B. (ed.), Peut-on former les dirigeants ? L’apport de la recherche, Paris, L’Harmattan, pp. 191–213.
- Moingeon, B. and G. Soenen (eds) (2002), Corporate and Organizational Identities : Integrating Strategy, Marketing, Communication, and Organizational Perspectives, London, Routledge.
- Soenen, G. and B. Moingeon (2002), "The five facets of collective identities : integrating corporate and organizational identity", in Moingeon, B. and G. Soenen (eds), Corporate and Organizational Identities : Integrating Strategy, Marketing, Communication, and Organizational Perspectives, London, Routledge, pp. 13–34.
- Nanda, A., Moingeon, B., Rohrer L. and G. Soenen (2002), Cap Gemini Ernst & Young (A) : A Global Merger, n°9-903-056, October, Harvard Business School Publishing, Cambridge.
- Nanda, A., Moingeon, B., Rohrer L. and G. Soenen (2002), Cap Gemini Ernst & Young (B) : A Global Merger, n°9-903-057, October, Harvard Business School Publishing, Cambridge.
- Le Joly K. and B. Moingeon (2002), " Gouvernance: le gouvernement d’entreprise en question ", in Montbrial de Th. et Ph. Moreau Defarges (eds), Ramses 2003 : les grandes tendances du monde, Paris, Dunod, pp. 270–271.
- Moingeon, "L’université est un levier de changement de la stratégie et de la culture de l’entreprise" in Saussereau, L and F. Stepler (ed.) Regards croisés sur le management du savoir. Vers les universités d’entreprise, Paris, éd. d’organisation, 2002, pp. 209–218.
- Le Joly, K. and B. Moingeon (eds) (2001), Gouvernement d'entreprise: débats théoriques et pratiques, Ellipses, Paris.
- Le Joly, K. and B. Moingeon (2001), "Corporate Governance ou Gouvernement d’Entreprise ?", in Le Joly, K. and B. Moingeon (eds), Gouvernement d'entreprise: débats théoriques et pratiques, Paris, Ellipses.
- Métais E. and B. Moingeon (2001), "Management de l'innovation: le learning mix", Revue Française de Gestion, 133, mars-avril-mai, pp. 113–125
- Moingeon, B. (2000), "Le sport comme spectacle télévisuel. Sa production et sa consommation" (35-48), in A.M. Gourdon (ed), Des arts et des spectacles à la télévision, Editions du CNRS, Paris.
- Moingeon, B. and E. Métais (2000), "Le management des compétences et capacités organisationnelles : illustration par le cas de l’entreprise Salomon" (263-286), in B. Quélin and J.L. Arrègles (dir.), Le management stratégique des compétences, Ellipses, Paris.
- Moingeon, B. and E. Métais (1999), "Stratégie de rupture basée sur des innovations radicales : Etude du cas de l’entreprise Salomon à la lumière de ses compétences et capacités organisationnelles", HEC Working Paper, n°677.
- Moingeon, B. (1999), "Approche socio-économique de la consommation des émissions sportives télévisuelles", HEC Working Paper, n°676.
- Moingeon, B. (1999), "From Corporate Culture to Corporate Identity", Corporate Reputation Review, 2, 4, Fall, pp. 352–360.
- Edmondson, A. and B. Moingeon (1999), "Learning, trust and organisational change: Contrasting models of intervention research in organisational behaviour" in M. Easterby-Smith, J.Burgoyne and L. Araujo (Eds.), Organizational Learning: Developments in Theory and Practice, London, Sage Publications.
- Moingeon, B. and A. Edmondson (1998), "Trust and Organizational Learning", in Lazaric, N. and E. Lorenz (eds.), The Economics of Trust and Learning, Londres, Edward Elgar Publishers.
- Moingeon, B., Ramanantsoa, B., Métais E. and D. Orton (1998), "Another Look at Strategy-Structure Relationships : the Resource-Based View", European Management Journal, VOL.16, 3, June, pp. 297–305.
- Moingeon, B. and B. Ramanantsoa (1997), " Apprendre à changer et changer pour apprendre ", in Albert, K. (ed.), L’art du management, Editions Village du Monde, Paris, pp. 608–612.
- Moingeon, B., Edmondson, A. and B. Ramanantsoa (1997), " Confiance et recherche-intervention ", in Finger, M. and B. Ruchat (eds.), Pour une nouvelle approche du management public. Réflexions autour de Michel Crozier, Paris, Seli Arslan, pp. 131–151.
- Moingeon, B. and B. Ramanantsoa (1997), "Understanding corporate identity: the French school of thought", European Journal of Marketing, vol. 31, n°5/6, pp. 383–395.
- Moingeon, B. and A. Edmondson (eds) (1996), Organizational Learning and Competitive Advantage, London, Sage.
- Edmondson, A. and B. Moingeon (1996), "When to Learn How and When to Learn Why : Appropriate Organizational Learning Processes as a Source of Competitive Advantage", in Moingeon, B. and A. Edmondson (eds) Organizational Learning and Competitive Advantage, London, Sage, pp. 17–37.
- Moingeon, B. (1996), " L'apprentissage organisationnel ", Sciences humaines, n°62, June, 36-39, also published in Ruano-Borbalan, J.C. (ed)(1998) Eduquer et Former, Ed. Sciences Humaines, Paris, 297-304 as well as in Cabin Ph. and J.C. Ruano-Borbalan (ed)(1998) Le Management aujourd’hui. Théories et pratiques, Ed. Démos, Paris, pp. 111–120.
- Edmondson, A. and B. Moingeon (1995), "Organizational Learning as a Source of Competitive Advantage: Learning How and Learning Why", HEC Working Paper, n°552.
- Moingeon, B. and B. Ramanantsoa (1995), " Comment rendre l'entreprise apprenante ", L'Expansion Management Review, September.
- Moingeon, B. and B. Ramanantsoa (1995), " L'apprentis sage organisationnel: Eléments pour une discussion " in Argyris, Chris . Savoir pour agir. Surmonter les obstacles à l'apprentissage organisationnel. Paris: InterEditions.
- Moingeon, B. and B. Ramanantsoa (1995), " Préface " et " Présentation générale " in Argyris, Chris . Savoir pour agir. Surmonter les obstacles à l'apprentissage organisationnel. Paris: InterEditions.
- Edmondson, A. and B. Moingeon (1995), "The Learning Organization: An Integrative Approach" in Alkhafaji, A. (ed.), Business Research Yearbook: Global Business Perspectives, Lanham, University Press of America, Volume II.
- Moingeon, B. and B. Ramanantsoa (1995), "An Identity Study of Firm Mergers: The Case of a French Savings Bank" in Klein, H.E. (ed.) Case Method Research and Application, Needham MA., WACRA, Volume VII.
- Moingeon, B. and B. Ramanantsoa (1995), "Approche socio-économique du management stratégique" in Ingham, M., (ed.), Management stratégique et compétitivité, Bruxelles, ed. De Boeck.
- Moingeon, B. and B. Ramanantsoa (1995), "The Caisses d'Epargne (French Savings Banks)" in Clarke-Hill, C.M. et K.W. Glaister (eds.), Cases in Strategic Management, London, Pitnam Publishing, 2nd edition.
- Moingeon, B. and B. Ramanantsoa (1995), "The Caisses d'Epargne (French Savings Banks)" in Clarke-Hill, C.M. and K.W. Glaister (eds.), Cases in Strategic Management. Instructor's Manual, Pitman Publishing, 2nd edition.
- Moingeon, B. (1994), "L'auto-analyse stratégique: un exercice délicat", L'Expansion Management Review, Fall.
- Moingeon, B. and T. Barefield (1994), "Tirer le meilleur du travail d'équipe: les travaux de Richard Hackman sur l'efficacité des équipes", L'Expansion Management Review, Summer.
- Moingeon, B. (1994), "Le mythe démystifié: la réforme des études à Harvard" in Les Professeurs du Groupe HEC, L'école des managers de demain, Paris, éd. Economica.
- Moingeon, B. (1994), "Approche identitaire des fusions et acquisitions" in Noël, A. and P. Dussauge, (eds), Perspectives en management stratégique, Tome 2, Paris, éd. Economica.
- Moingeon, B. (1994), "Une grille de lecture des organisations", Direction et gestion des entreprises, 145, January–February.
- Détrie, J.P., Dromby F. and B. Moingeon (1994), "Comment perdre par raison et gagner par chance. La théorie des effets pervers appliquée à la stratégie des entreprises de haute-technologie", Gérer et comprendre, 35, June.
- Ramanantsoa, B. and B. Moingeon (1993), "Non-Profit Organizations: The Market Within the Bureaucracy. The Case of Sporting Leagues" in Child, J, Crozier, M., Mayntz, R. et al., Societal Change Between Market and Organization, Aldershot, Avebury.
- Moingeon, B. (1993), « La sociologie de Pierre Bourdieu et son apport au marketing », Recherche et Applications en Marketing, n°2.
- Moingeon, B. (1991), Contribution à une socio-économie des organisations: l'example d'un univers associatif, Dissertation, PhD in Sociology, University of Franche-Comté.
- Ramanantsoa, B. and B. Moingeon (1991), "A Necessary Taking into Account of the "Sameness" and of the Conflict in the Definition of Corporate Culture and Identity", HEC Working Paper, n°414.
