= Bertrand Denis =

French industrialist and politician

Bertrand Denis (1902–1986) was a French industrialist and politician.

== Politics ==
He was a general councilor (French: conseiller général) of the Mayenne department of the Pays de la Loire region in north-west France from 1945. In 1953 he became the mayor of the commune of Contest in the Mayenne department.

Denis was a member of the French National Assembly from 1958 to 1978.

In 1962, Denis left the National Centre of Independents and Peasants (CNIP) party to be involved in the formation of the Independent Republicans (French: Républicains Indépendants, RI) party.

Bertrand Denis is a graduate of HEC Paris.
