= Hôtel Le Marois =

Coordinates: 48°51′57.253″N 2°18′34.533″E

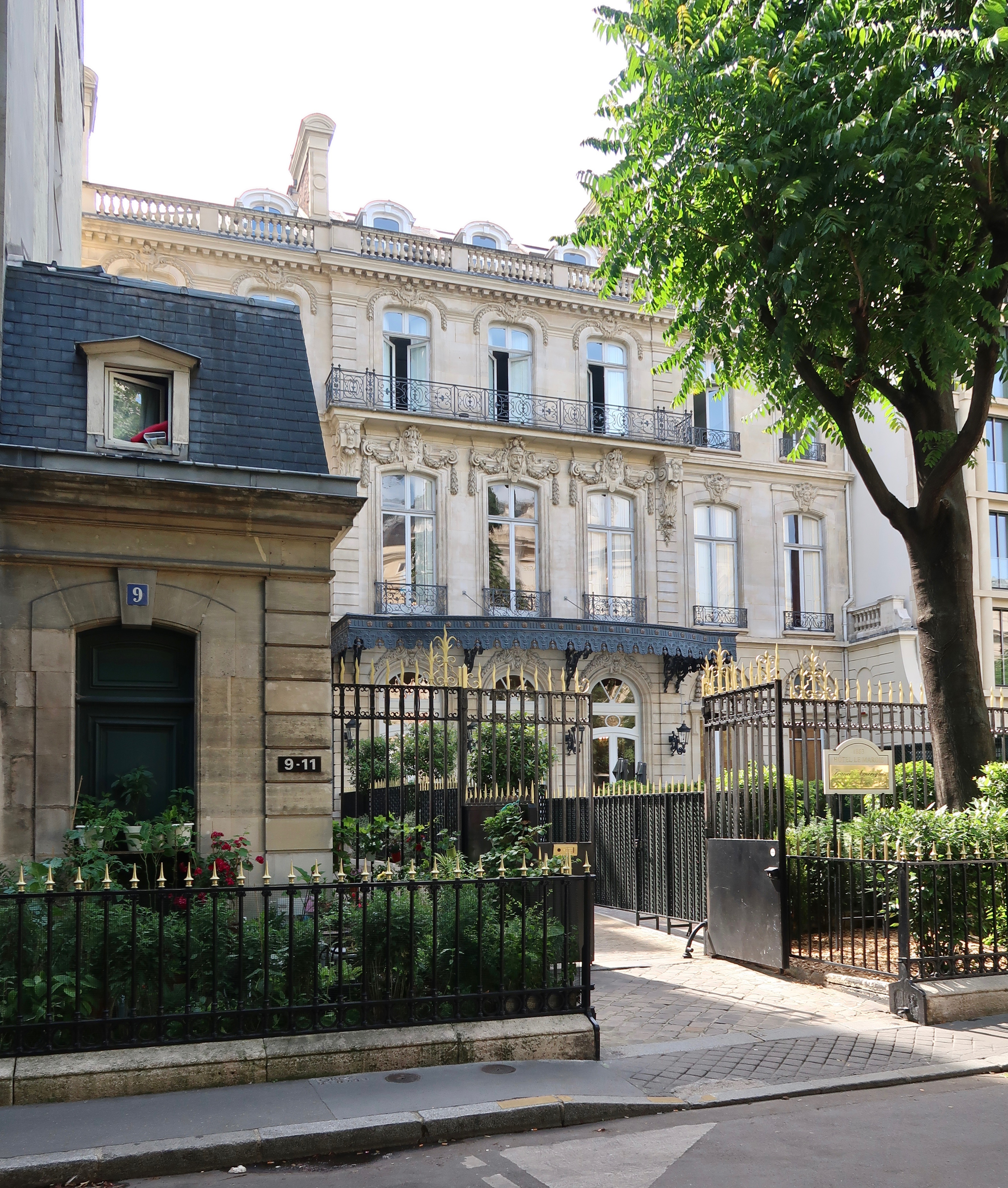
- Hôtel Le Marois
- Interactive map of the Hôtel Le Marois area

General information
- Architectural style: Classicism
- Location: 9-11 avenue Franklin-D.-Roosevelt, Paris, France
- Completed: 1863

Design and construction
- Architect: Henri Parent

The Hôtel Le Marois (French pronunciation: [otɛl lə maʁwa]) is an hôtel particulier located in Paris, France.

== Location ==
It is located at 9–11, avenue Franklin-D.-Roosevelt, in the 8th arrondissement of Paris.

The district is served by Métro lines (1) (13) at the Champs-Élysées - Clemenceau station and by RATP bus lines 28 72 93.

== History ==
The Hôtel Le Marois, also known as the Hôtel de Ganay, was built in 1863 for Count Le Marois (1802-1870), son of General Le Marois, aide-de-camp to Napoleon I, on the site, it is said, of 'a house inhabited by the courtesan Marie Duplessis (1824-1847), model of The Lady of the Camellias by Alexandre Dumas fils. Deputy of La Manche under the July Monarchy, senator in 1852, Count Le Marois was at the head of a great fortune and collected old and modern paintings. He left his old hotel on rue Blanche to move to the Champs-Élysées district. He had the hotel on the avenue d'Antin built by the architect Henri Parent.

The land on which the hotel is built covers an area of 1,700 m2. According to the description of the cadastre of 1863: “Hotel having entrance by two carriage gates and a single door on the avenue d’Antin. It is placed between a main courtyard and a backyard. Composed of a main building with facade of seven windows. Double in depth, with wing on the right and annexes on the left on the second courtyard. Raised on cellars and median, the ground floor, two square floors arranged in magnificent apartments, a third paneled for secondary accommodation”. The house was completed in 1865.

In 1870, Jean Polydore Le Marois installed the painting by Horace Vernet, produced in 1827, Edith finding the body of Harold after the battle of Hastings, which he had acquired from an art dealer on the Boulevard des Italiens in Paris.

The hotel remained the property of the Le Marois until March 1927, when the Countess Jacques-André de Ganay (née Le Marois), who had held a “very elegant salon” there, sold it to the Association France- Americas, founded in 1909 by Gabriel Hanotaux. She then offered Vernet's painting, whose monumental dimensions did not allow easy transport, to the City of Cherbourg. It is still preserved today at the musée Thomas-Henry.

The common buildings gave way, in 1956, to two office buildings. More recently, the second floor of the hotel has been completely refurbished and the lounges on the ground floor and first floor are rented for receptions. The caterer-reception organizer Butard Enescot, which managed the reception areas from the end of the 1990s to 2007, regained the concession for the Salons France-Amériques in 2015.

The association of graduates of the École des Hautes Etudes Commerciales de Paris, HEC Alumni, is located in the hotel.
