= FFA Private Bank =

- Company type: Private
- Industry: Financial services
- Founded: 2006; 20 years ago
- Headquarters: Dubai, United Arab Emirates
- Key people: Jean Riachi (Chairman)
- Website: www.ffaprivatebank.com

FFA Private Bank is a financial institution based in Dubai (DIFC), United Arab Emirates specializing in the fields of capital markets, wealth management and advisory services.

== History and profile ==
FFA Private Bank (Dubai) Ltd, founded in 2006, is regulated by the Dubai Financial Services Authority (DFSA) and operates from within the Dubai International Financial Center (DIFC), and is fully owned by FFA Group Holding ltd, a Dubai based company registered in the DIFC.

FFA Real Estate Ltd, fully owned by FFA Group Holding ltd, is actively involved in the development and management of real estate projects and properties across Europe, notably through FFA Real Estate GMBH, its German subsidiary.
