= Rémi Babinet =

French advertising designer

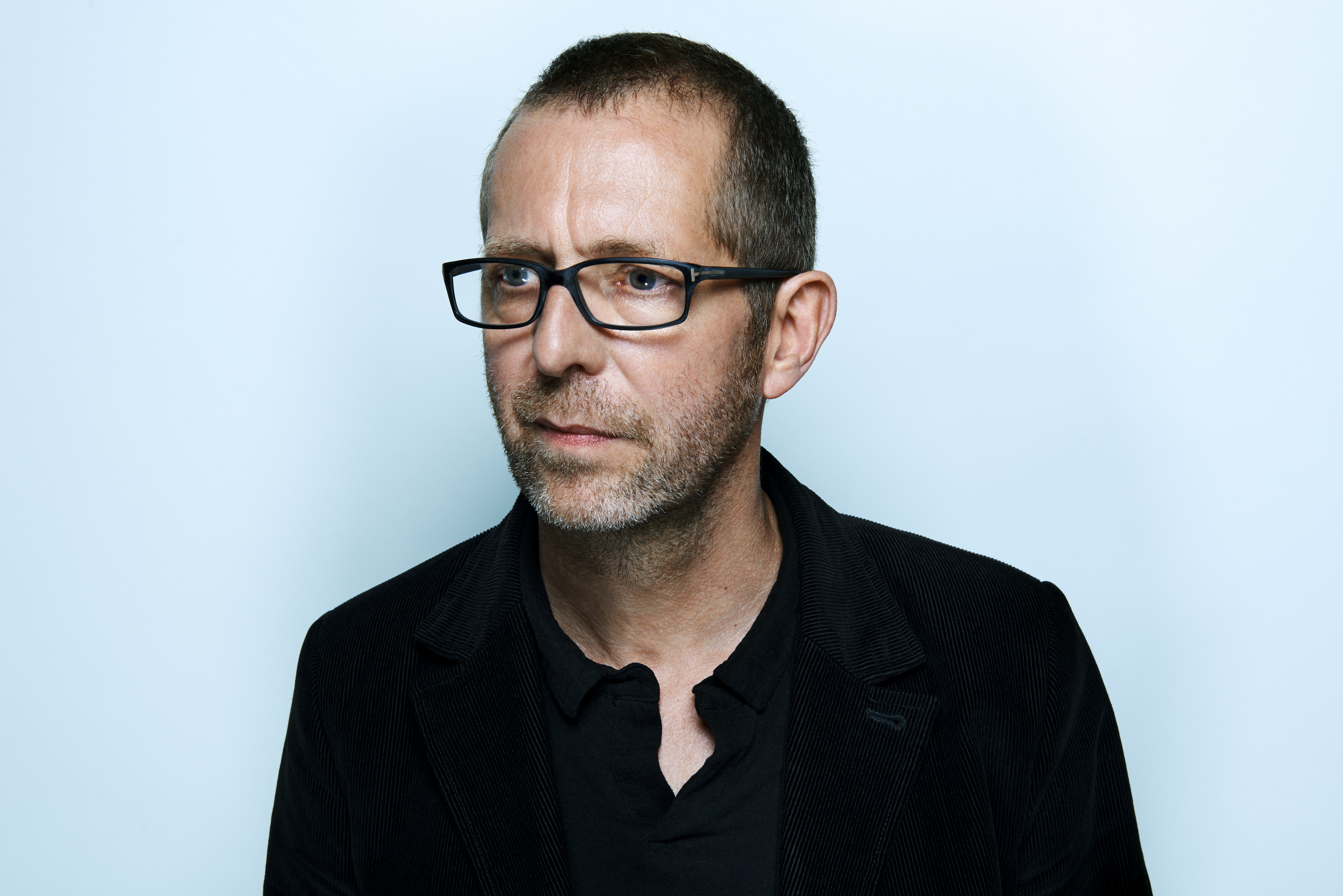
- Babinet in 2016
- Born: 1957 (age 68–69); Paris, France
- Occupation: Creative director (advertising)
- Known for: Evian's "Live Young" campaign

Rémi Babinet (born 1957) is a French creative director, best known for his work on Evian's "Live Young" campaign. He is the founding chairman of BETC and global chief creative officer of Havas. He is also the author of the book BETC Paris – Global Advertising Agency.

== Career ==
Babinet's advertising career began in the late 1980s with internships at Saatchi & Saatchi, Y&R and BDDP (now TBWA Paris). In 1986 BDDP hired him as a copywriter and he eventually rose to the position of creative director. During that period, and alongside his partner, the art director Philippe Pollet-Villard, he produced campaigns for Polaroid, Virgin Megastore, BMW, McCain, Le Monde, Wonderbra, Galeries Lafayette and Canal+. In 1995, Babinet founded the agency Babinet Tong Cuong alongside associate Eric Tong Cuong. Mercedes Erra joined them in 1995 and the agency was renamed Babinet Erra Tong Cuong Euro RSCG. Tong Cuong left the company in 2002. In July 2005, Babinet was made chief creative officer of Euro RSCG Worldwide (today known as Havas Worldwide). From 2003 to 2007, Babinet was president of the French Art Directors Club and in June 2014, he presided over the press jury at the Cannes Lions International Festival of Creativity.

In May 2016, Forbes magazine selected Babinet as one of the world's ten best creative directors.

=== BETC ===
Babinet cofounded BETC, a French advertising agency, in 1995. Babinet has spoken extensively about what he believes sets BETC apart from other agencies. In an interview with Brazil's Meio & Mensagem publication, he claims the difference stems from two things: "The first is that we do not have a creative process formalized: No rules, no preconceived ideas." The second is that they "do not believe in the culture of globalization, a mold that fits all. We believe that a strong brand globally needs to have powerful roots." Building on that last idea, Babinet has said BETC makes a conscious effort to separate itself from how people perceive the French, a culture he calls "unique" but something people either "love or hate". He considers BETC an "international brand" that retains a French identity because of its work with renowned French brands, such as Air France, Evian and Lacoste. On advertising in general, Babinet has said he finds "simplicity is the most difficult of all to achieve".

In 2008, Babinet wrote the book ‘'BETC Paris'’. The book is an overview of BETC's trajectory, work and agency culture, with a special focus on its efforts in music, fashion, design and photography.

BETC London was opened in 2011. In 2014, BETC São Paulo was opened.

Babinet continues to act as global creative director for several of BETC's largest clients, including Air France and Evian, whose “Rollerbabies” campaign was listed in the Guinness Book of World Records as the most-viewed online ad to date (45,166,109 views at the time of its 2009 distinction).

In July 2016 BETC moved to Les Magasins généraux in Pantin.

== Personal life ==
Babinet was born in 1957 in the Paris suburb of Suresnes. His father is a university law professor and his mother operates an independent children's bookstore in Strasbourg.
