= BETC =

French advertising agency

- Industry: Advertising
- Founded: 1995
- Founders: Rémi Babinet, Eric Tong Cuong, Mercedes Erra
- Headquarters: Paris, France
- Website: betc.com/en/

BETC is a French advertising agency founded in Paris in 1995. The name of the company stands for Babinet, Erra and Tong Cuong, the founding members.

The agency notably designed campaigns for clients such as Air France, Evian, Lacoste and Canal+, and was voted as the most creative agency for eight consecutive years

== History ==
Rémi Babinet and Eric Tong Cuong founded the agency Babinet Tong Cuong in 1994. It is part of the Havas Worldwide group of companies (formerly Euro RSCG Worldwide). In 1995, they were joined by Mercedes Erra and the agency was renamed Babinet Erra Tong Cuong Euro RSCG. In 2002, Eric Tong Cuong left the company. In July 2005, Babinet and Erra were appointed managing directors of Havas in addition to their responsibilities manning BETC. In 2007, Stéphane Xiberras, who joined BETC as creative director in 1999, was asked to join them as BETC's president and Chief Creative Officer.

BETC is made up of roughly 900 people, most of which work out of its headquarters, an industrial building that formerly housed an "Aux Classes Laborieuses" department store on the Faubourg Saint Martin in Paris.

The agency manages over 70 clients, of which 70% are global, including Peugeot, Air France, Evian, Canal+, Lacoste, L'Oreal, Petit Bateau, Disneyland Paris, McDonald's, and Mondelez, formerly Kraft Foods. In November 2012, BETC was appointed global communications agency for luxury brand Louis Vuitton.

BETC is divided into numerous branches, including luxury-focused BETC Luxe, brand identity firm BETC Design, sound department BETC Pop, BETC Digital, launched in 2010; retail-focused BETC Shopper, launched in 2007; BETC Start Up Lab, founded in 2011; and BETC Content, launched in 2011.

Notably, in May 2011 parent company Havas supported plans to spin BETC into a global network, beginning in London, then expanding to Brazil, the United States, and Asia. BETC London launched in June 2011, led by Matthew Charlton, former CEO of Modernista, and Creative Director Neil Dawson. Its clients include Bacardi, Cow & Gate, Samsung, Ibis and Diet Coke. In January 2014, Charlton and Dawson left BETC London and CEO Andrew Stirk (formerly Executive Planning Director at the agency) and Executive Creative Director Rosie Bardales (previously Creative Director at Wieden+Kennedy Amsterdam) took over the management leadership of the agency.

In February 2014, BETC launched BETC São Paulo with the tandem Erh Ray and Gal Barradas as co-CEOs. BETC plans to open other offices in the coming 18 months, in particular in the US where potential locations include Austin, TX; Chicago; Miami; Portland; and New York.

In July 2016 BETC moved to Les Magasins généraux in Pantin, a former industrial building in the Greater Paris area. The agency, and Rémi Babinet in particular, have been involved in cultural and social activities in the surrounding area.

In May 2016, Forbes Magazine selected Rémi Babinet as one of the world's 10 Best Creative Directors.

== Campaigns of note ==
"The Bear", a commercial for French premium network Canal+, was recognised in 2013 as the world's most-awarded TV spot in the history of the Gunn Report, an award publication detailing the most successful print and television advertising campaigns. Also in 2013, the campaign 'Baby and me' for Evian was ranked the most viewed on-line campaign in the world.

=== Air France ===
BETC won the Air France global account in 1998. Signature work includes the 1999 launch campaign 'Flight', shot by Michel Gondry and accompanied by music from the indie group the Chemical Brothers. In 2011, it launched a new ad directed and choreographed by Angelin Preljocaj, featuring dancer Benjamin Millepied and accompanied by a Mozart concerto, interpreted by orchestra Les Siècles alongside pianist Vanessa Wagner and conductor François-Xavier Roth. The creative director on all Air France campaigns is Rémi Babinet.

=== Canal+ ===
In 2011, for pay network Canal+, BETC launched "The Bear", a humorous ad that follows a bearskin rug that is cast as a renowned movie director. Led by creative director Stéphane Xiberras, the ad won one Silver and three Gold Lions, including Film Craft, at the Cannes Lions International Advertising Festival in 2012.

In February 2013, the Gunn Report ranked "The Bear" as the most-awarded spot in its history.

=== Evian ===
Led by creative director Rémi Babinet, the agency's work for the water brand includes 1998's Waterbabies TV campaign and 2009's Rollerbabies, which was included in the Guinness Book of Records as the most viewed online ad at the time, generating 45,166,109 views as of 9 November 2009. In April 2013, BETC launched a new global campaign for Evian, entitled Baby and me and featuring a remix by French DJ Yuksek of the 1990s hit "Here Comes the Hotstepper", by Ini Kamoze.

== Awards ==
- 2012: Film Craft Grand Prix Lion for Canal+ "The Bear"
- 2012: Agency of the Year, New York Art Directors' Club
- 2019: International Agency of the Year, Adweek
- 2020: Film Grand Prix Lion for Lacoste "Crocodile Inside"
