= Jean Riachi =

Lebanese banker (born 1963)

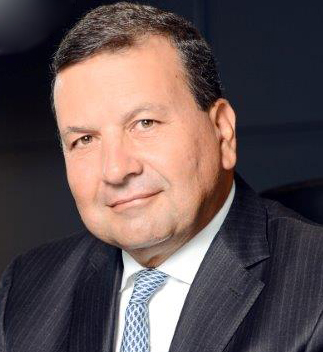
- Born: 1963 (age 62–63)
- Education: HEC Paris
- Occupation: CEO of FFA Private Bank

Jean Riachi (born 1963) is the founder and current CEO and Chairman of the Board of I&C Bank, Lebanon's largest specialized bank.

Jean Riachi is also the founder and Chairman of FFA Private Bank Dubai Limited, a financial services firm regulated by the DFSA and operating from the Dubai International Financial Center (DIFC).

== Education ==
Born and raised in Lebanon, Jean Riachi completed his high school education at Lycee Louis-le-Grand in Paris and graduated from HEC Paris business school in 1985. He also holds a Certificate in Corporate Governance (IDP-C) from INSEAD's International Directors Program.
