= Jean-Paul Agon =

French businessman (born 1956)

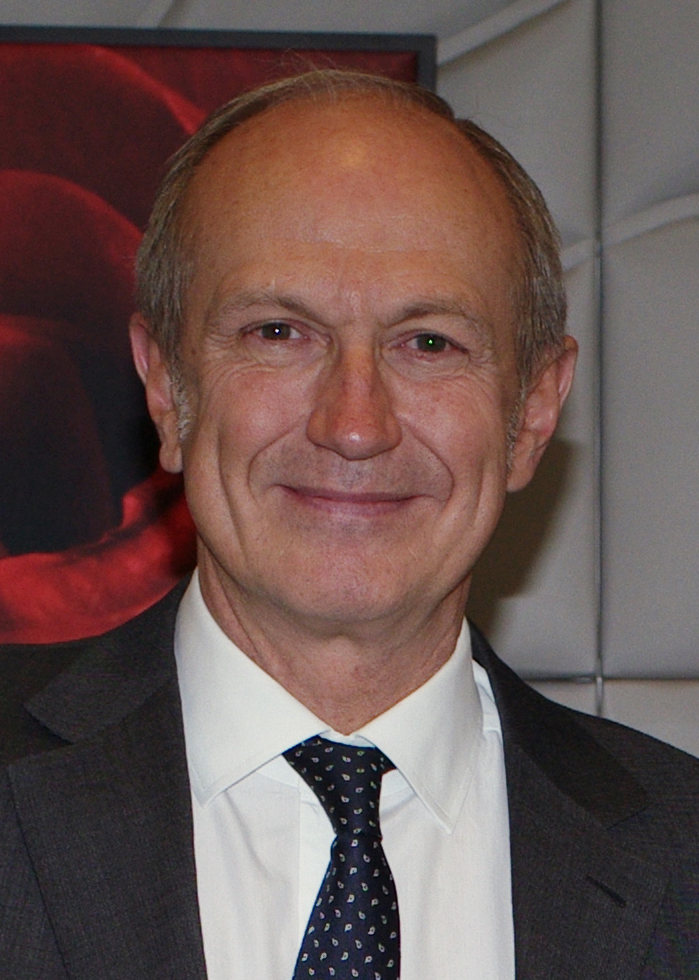
- Agon in 2014
- Born: 6 July 1956 (age 70); Boulogne-Billancourt, France
- Education: HEC Paris (1978)
- Occupation: Chairman of L'Oréal

Jean-Paul Agon (born 6 July 1956) is a French businessman who is the chairman and former CEO of the international cosmetic company L'Oréal. Because of the age limit of 65 set by the company, he was replaced in his role of CEO by Nicolas Hieronimus on 1 May 2021, while remaining chairman of the board. He graduated from HEC Paris in 1978.

== Career ==
=== Early career ===
Agon joined L’Oréal in 1978 after completing his studies at the HEC International Business School. He has spent his entire career in prominent sales and marketing positions across several markets with the company. He started as a product manager for the Consumer Products division in France when he was 24 years old and then in 1981 was appointed General Manager of L'Oréal Greece, where he laid the foundations of a solid business. In 1985, he returned to France as General Manager of L'Oreal Paris, where he oversaw a number of key launches and successes, including Studio Line, Plénitude and Elsève. In 1989, he became International Managing Director for Biotherm, remodeling and endowing the brand with international appeal. In 1994, he became managing director of L'Oréal Germany, where he played a key role in dealing with issues related to European markets, at the time suffering a slowdown in growth. In 1997, he was entrusted with the task of setting up and heading the L'Oreal Asia Zone in the midst of an economic crisis. He created subsidiaries in a number of countries, stepped up investment and recruited a new generation of local talent.

=== 2001–present ===
In 2001, Agon was named President of L'Oréal USA. He was instrumental in launching the Garnier Fructis line.

In 2006, Agon was appointed as CEO of L’Oréal. He became chairman of the company in February 2011. Known for his views on the "universalization" of beauty, Agon began the process of opening three new L’Oréal factories outside France – in Mexico, Egypt and Indonesia. Agon is also dedicated to environmental protection and aims to reduce the company's carbon dioxide emissions, water consumption, and waste production by 50% between 2005 and 2015. Under his guidance, L’Oreal has continued to appear in the rankings of the 100 most sustainable companies in the world for four years in a row. Agon, along with 16 other executives and investors such as Stéphane Richard and Liliane Bettencourt, signed a petition in 2011 calling for a tax on the rich, as a way of contributing to society during troubled times. "I thought that, in difficult times, people with high salaries should contribute," stated Agon.

Agon was the 5th CEO of the L’Oreal Group. Over the course of his time as CEO, L’Oreal made several acquisitions including: Essie Cosmetics; Maly's Midwest and Marshall's Salon Services. In 2011, under Agon's leadership, the company acquired Bioscience Laboratories and then in 2012 acquired Cadum, Urban Decay and the Columbian Vogue Group.

== Vision ==
During his CEO tenure, Agon shaped a new philosophy of global marketing with his doctrine of universalization: beauty for all. Another focus was expanding into developing countries, with the goal of winning one billion new customers by 2020. In addition to his vision for L’Oreal, Agon also had strong viewpoints on corporate social responsibility; often being quoted as stating “the leader in beauty must be exemplary in terms of the environment.” To this end, L’Oreal has made the commitment to halve their CO_{2} emissions, water consumption and waste production within the next 10 years. Agon has stated that corporate social responsibility issues are as important as business profitability and this is shown with the announcement of the group wide sustainability plan that was announced in 2013.

== Other activities ==
=== Corporate boards ===
- Air Liquide, Member of the Board of Directors

=== Non-profit organizations ===
- Consumer Goods Forum (CFF), Member of the Board of Directors
- European Round Table of Industrialists (ERT), Member
- Institut français des relations internationales (Ifri), Member of the Board of Directors

== Recognition ==
- 2005: Elected "HEC Alumni of the Year."
- 2009: Awarded the "Pace Leadership in Ethics Award 2008" by the Ethics Resource Center in New York.
- 2011: Awarded International Human Relations Award by AJC in New York.

Business positions
Preceded by Lindsay Owen-Jones	CEO of L'Oréal; 2011–present	Succeeded by Incumbent
