= Mercedes Erra =

French business woman

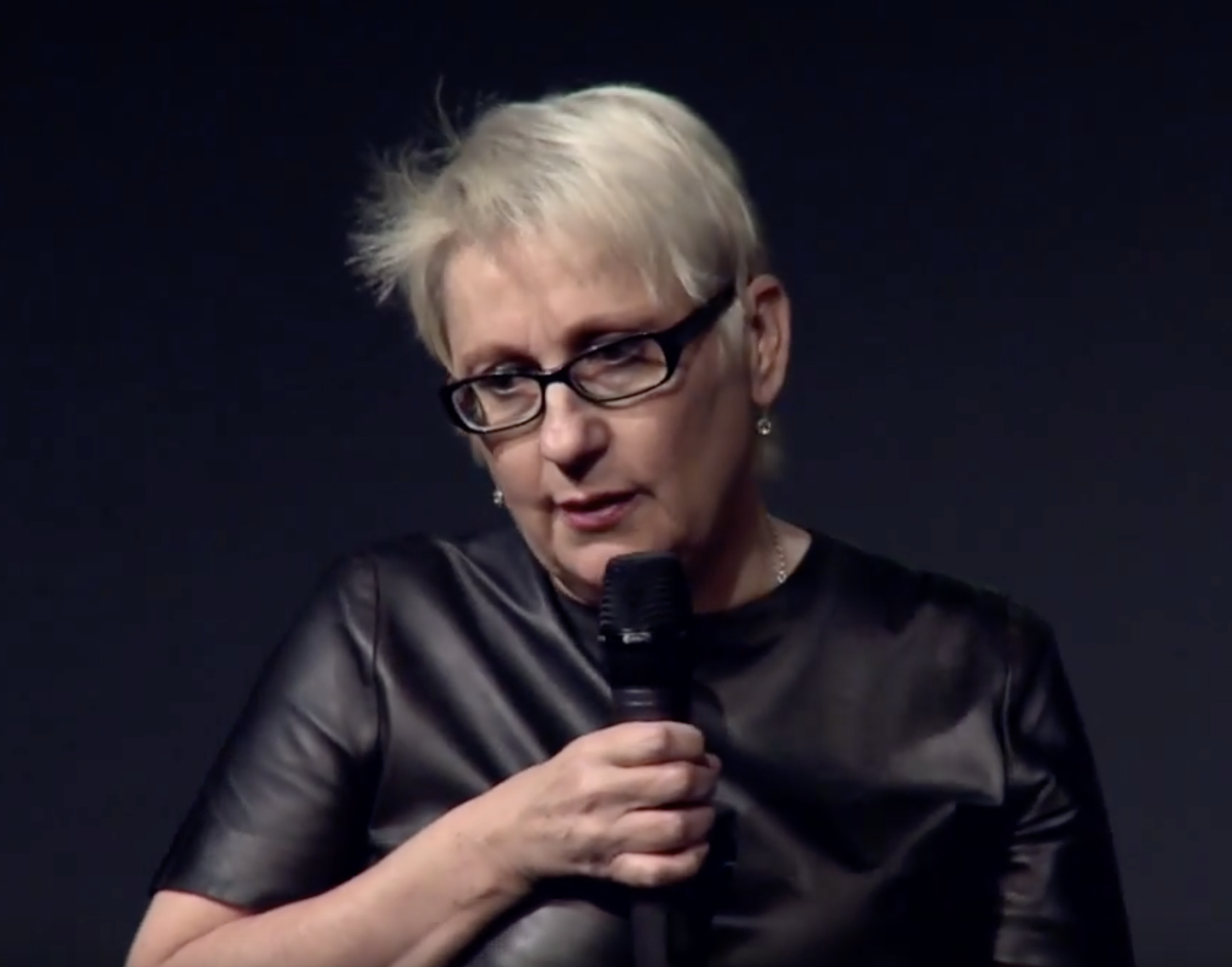
- Born: 23 September 1954 (age 71); Sabadell, Spain
- Education: HEC Paris
- Occupation: Executive President Havas Worldwide

Mercedes Erra is a French business woman who was born 23 September 1954 in Sabadell.

She is the Executive President of Havas Worldwide (formerly Euro RSCG Worldwide), Co-Founder of BETC, and Managing Director of Havas.

Mercedes Erra is an expert and specialist in branding and communication building. She is famous for working on different subjects and inspiring new ways of communication for brands such as health for Danone, young for Evian, or the vision of Air France. Her "Roller Babies" campaign for Evian (played to the song Rapper's Delight) made the Guinness Book of Records for being viewed over 75 million times. The agency she co-founded, BETC Euro RSCG, has, in 15 years, become the first French agency and the second most creative in the world (Gunn Report January 2011). Mercedes considers herself a feminist.

== Biography ==
Born in Barcelona, she moved to France at age six. She studied at HEC Paris (Promotion 1981).

== Career ==
Starting as an intern at Saatchi & Saatchi in 1981, she successively became Advertising Chief, Client Manager, Deputy General Manager and finally became in 1990 General Director of Saatchi & Saatchi Advertising until 1995. She is the "E" of BETC (Babinet Erra Tong Cuong).

Erra is an advocate for women's leadership. Co-founder of the Women’s Forum for the Economy and Society, she is also committed to serving UNICEF and the ELLE Foundation. She is an active member of the French Committee of Human Rights Watch, and permanent member of the French commission on Women's image through media.

Mercedes Erra was chairman of the French version of the Advertising Association between 2002 and 2004.

In March 2012, Erra was named to the board of directors of the Art Media Society.

== See also ==
Evian Roller babies became the "most viral ad ever"
