= Nicolas Hieronimus =

French businessman

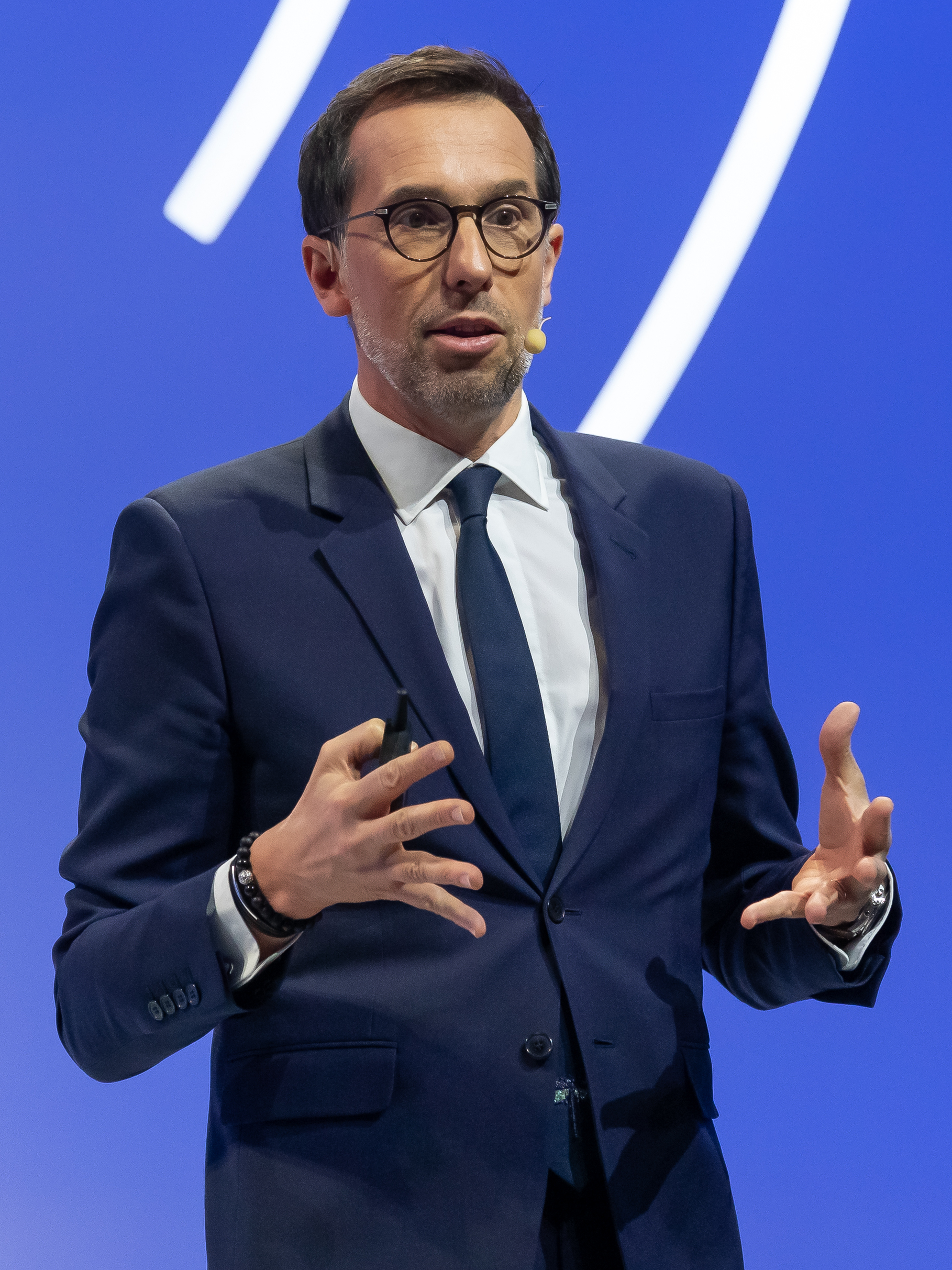
- Hieronimus in 2020
- Born: 3 January 1964 (age 62); Paris, France
- Education: ESSEC
- Occupations: CEO, L'Oréal

Nicolas Hieronimus (born 3 January 1964) is a French businessman, and the CEO of the L'Oréal Group since May 1, 2021, the sixth CEO in the history of the group, taking the place of Jean-Paul Agon, who remains the chairman of the group.

== Early life ==
Born in Paris on 3 January 1964, in a Jewish family, Hieronimus' father was a television producer and his mother an engineer in the aerospace sector.

He attended ESSEC Business School in 1981, graduating in 1985 with a degree in marketing.

== Career at L'Oréal ==
Hieronimus joined L'Oréal in 1987 as a product manager on the Garnier brand.

As marketing director at Garnier Laboratories in the 1990s, he created, developed and launched the Fructis haircare and Movida hair color ranges. In 1998 he led the Garnier and Maybelline businesses in the United Kingdom and launched the Fructis franchise and the Maybelline brand on to the British market.

He was responsible for creating the International Brand Management of L'Oréal Paris and became International Managing Director of L'Oréal Paris. He launched the Dermo-Expertise skincare and the line of men's skin care, Men Expert.

After becoming head of L'Oréal Mexico in 2005, Hieronimus became general manager of the Professional Products Division in 2008. He launched the Inoa hair color line.

In January 2011, he was named President of L'Oréal Luxe, which he helped to transform by upgrading and modernizing its major brands, and by focusing on consumer experience, service and retail. He steered the acquisitions of Urban Decay, IT Cosmetics and Atelier Cologne, as well as the Valentino license and the extension of the Armani license.

Hieronimus became President Selective Divisions (Luxury, Active Cosmetics, Professional Products) on July 1, 2013 and was named Deputy CEO in charge of Divisions on May 1, 2017.

In May 2021, he became CEO of the company.

== Honours ==
In 2016, Hieronimus became a Knight of the Legion of Honour.

== Personal life ==
Hieronimus is married to a former L'Oréal executive and has two sons.
