= HEC Paris =

Business school in France

- French: École des hautes études commerciales de Paris
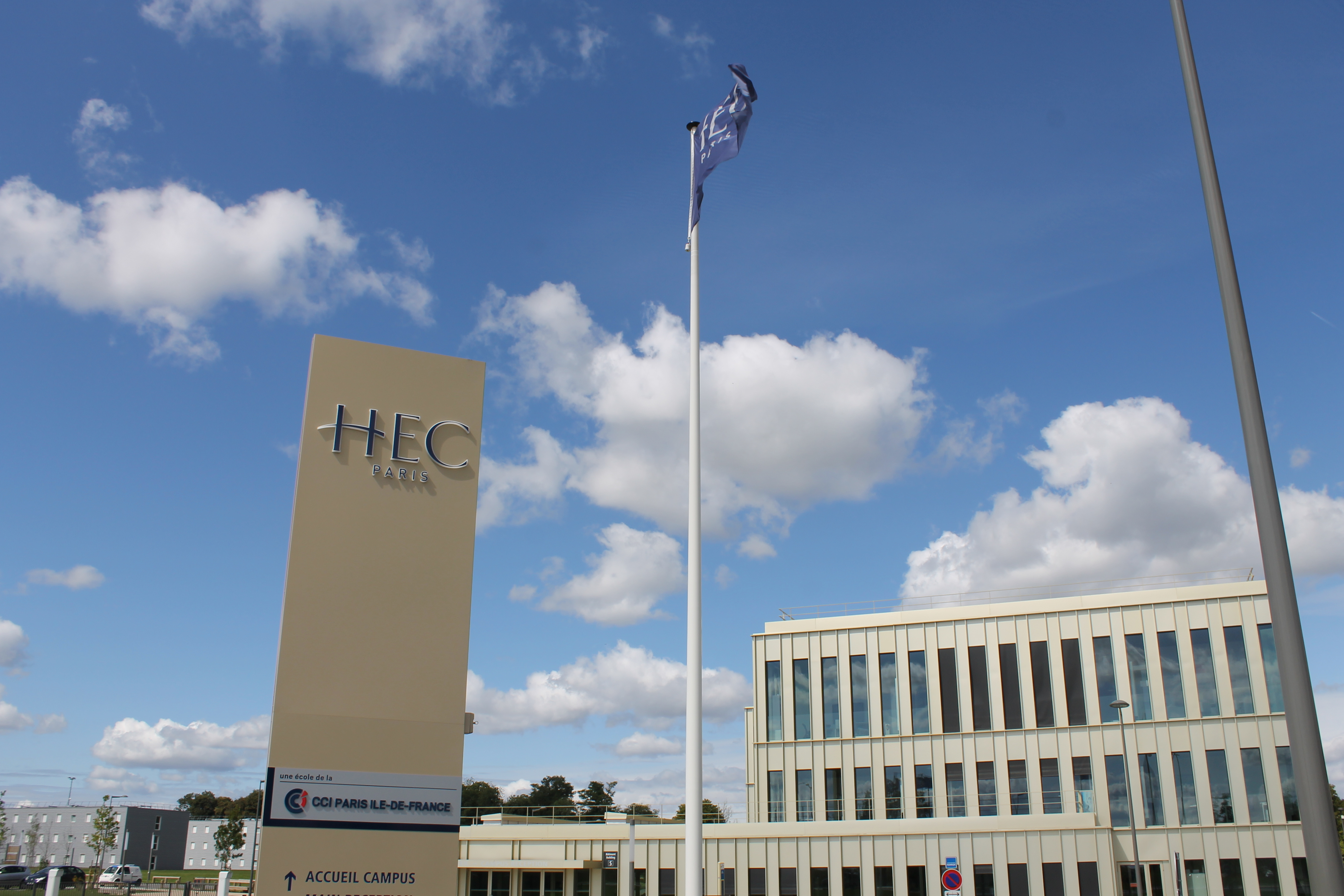
- Campus main entrance, in Jouy-en-Josas, Yvelines
- Motto: French: Oser l’impossible
- Motto in English: Literal: Dare the Impossible
- Type: Grande école de commerce et de management, École consulaire; (Private research university Business school)
- Established: 4 December 1881; 144 years ago
- Founder: Gustave Emmanuel Roy
- Accreditation: Triple accreditation: AACSB; AMBA; EQUIS
- Affiliations: Conférence des grandes écoles; CEMS; Polytechnic Institute of Paris
- Endowment: €100 million (2022)
- Budget: €205 million (2024)
- Chairman: Jean-Paul Agon
- Dean: Éloïc Peyrache
- Faculty: 160 resident professors; 96% PhD; 30% female; 64% international
- Students: 5,453 (postgraduate); 8,000 (executive)
- Location: Paris (Jouy-en-Josas), France; Abidjan, Ivory Coast; Beijing, China; Doha, Qatar; Dubai, United Arab Emirates; London, United Kingdom; New York City, United States; Tokyo, Japan; Paris: 48°45′29″N 2°10′13″E
- Admission rate: 7% (2024)
- Colors: Blue and White
- Website: www.hec.edu

HEC Paris (French: École des hautes études commerciales de Paris, lit. 'Paris School of Advanced Business Studies') is a non-profit business school and grande école located in Jouy-en-Josas, a southwestern outer suburb of Paris, France. The school has other campuses in Doha, Qatar and in Abidjan, Ivory Coast.

It offers Bachelor, MiM, MSc in International Finance, MBA, EMBA, executive education, professional development, professional certification, and PhD programs.

== History ==
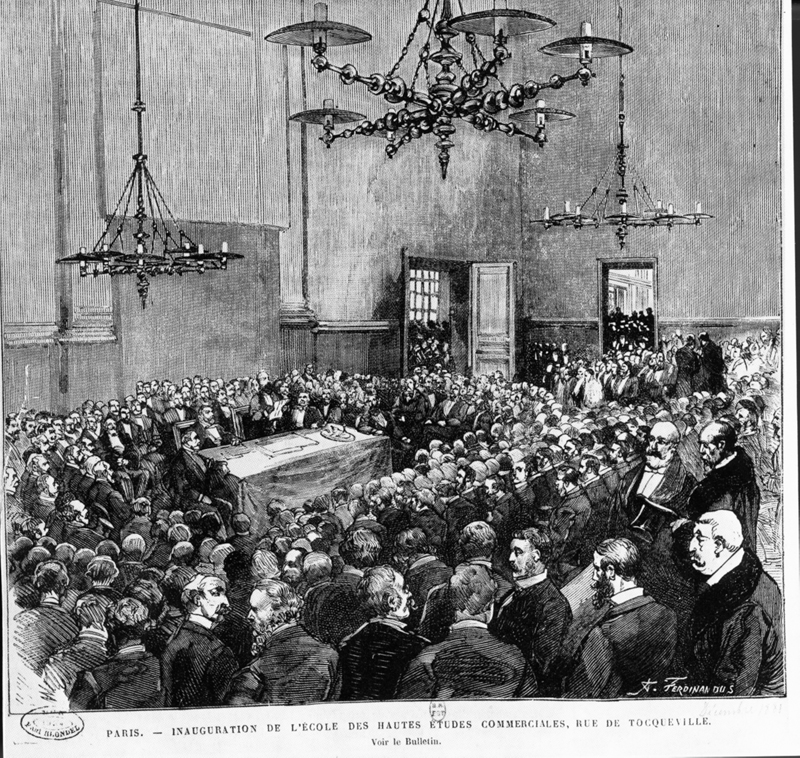
1881 HEC Paris' inauguration, rue de Tocqueville, in Paris

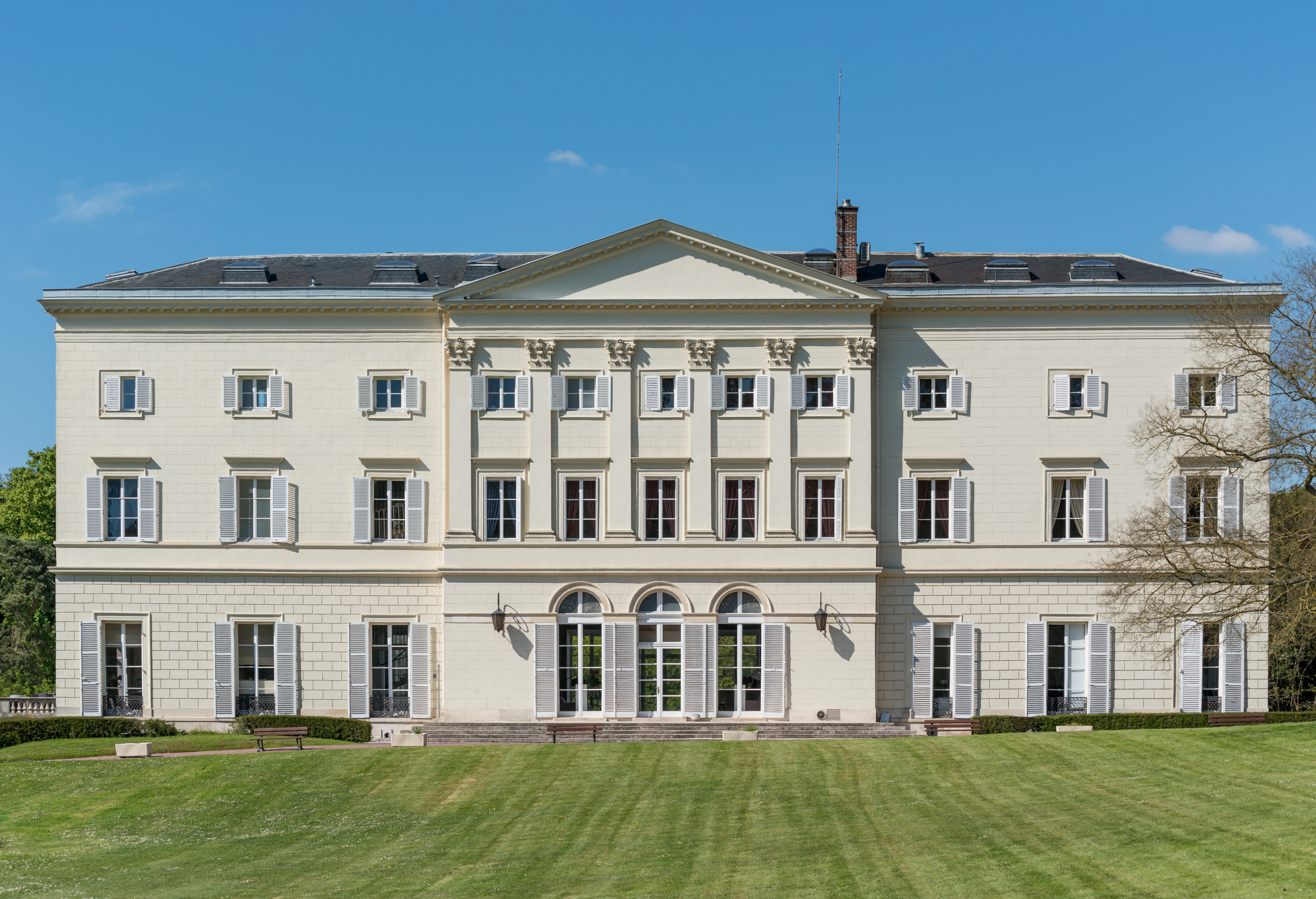
The château at HEC Paris, dedicated to executive education

Founded in 1881 by Gustave Emmanuel Roy, president of the Paris Chamber of Commerce (CCIP), with 57 students in its first class, the École des hautes études commerciales de Paris (HEC) aimed to be in the fields of management and commerce what the École Centrale de Paris was in the field of engineering.

In 1921, the school introduced the case-based method of the Harvard Business School, but most of the lectures remained theoretical. In 1938, the HEC program was lengthened to 3 years.

Due to French corporations' demand for North-American-style management education, at the end of the 1950s, the case-based method was generalized and a one-year classe préparatoire was created to prepare for the entrance examination, which had become more difficult. As a result, only 9% of HEC students had attended university in 1959, whereas 47% had done so in 1929.

In 1964, French President Charles de Gaulle inaugurated a new 250-acre (100 ha) wooded campus in Jouy-en-Josas. In 1967, HEC launched its executive education programs. Women have been accepted at HEC since 1973. Only 27 women were accepted that year and HEC jeunes filles (HECJF), another school dedicated to women, was closed. Its alumnae are officially considered graduates of HEC, and include Édith Cresson, the first female Prime Minister of France.

The doctoral course was established in 1975 but until 1985 doctoral students had to complete their thesis at the university. In 1985 the HEC obtained the right to award the title of doctor, before ESSEC (2010) and ESCP (2012).

The school has developed professorships financed by companies (Deloitte, EDF, Toshiba and others) to multiply links between HEC and companies. The HEC Foundation, founded in 1972, has the specific aim of developing these connections and the financing of the school by companies.

Ties with businesses were strengthened in the 1990s and this led to greater specialization, with the establishment of finance and entrepreneurship courses in 1986. As a consequence of the financial Big Bang and the explosion of the City, more and more graduates went to work in England and, in general, abroad. In 2006, a third found their first job abroad. In 2015 the school adopted a new legal statute to allow private investors to join the board of directors.

In 1988, HEC founded the CEMS network with ESADE, Bocconi University and the University of Cologne.

On 1 July 2008, HEC Paris joined ParisTech and then Paris-Saclay University as a founding member. The university campus of Jouy-en-Josas, in the Yvelines department, is located in the northern part of the technological cluster of Paris-Saclay, which brings together a quarter of French public research. HEC Paris is part of the network of graduate schools of business (ESC) in the Paris Île-de-France area, together with ESSEC and ESCP Business School.

In 2016, the school adopted a new legal status and became a public-private partnership (École consulaire or EESC), largely financed by the public Chamber of Commerce in Paris.

In 2017, HEC launched a portfolio of new dual degree programs called M2M with the University of St. Gallen, the Yale School of Management, the Hong Kong University of Science and Technology, and Fundação Getulio Vargas.

The same year in March, the school launched the Executive Master in innovation & entrepreneurship program in collaboration with Coursera.

On 15 September 2020, the school co-founded with the Polytechnic Institute of Paris the artificial intelligence research center Hi! PARIS.

In October 2023 the school announced the creation of a Bachelor of Arts in data, society and organisations in collaboration with Bocconi University in Milan.

In December 2024, the foundation announced the results of the 2019-2024 "Impact Tomorrow" campaign. 213 million euros were raised, a record for a French grande école.

The end of 2025 saw the business school announce its 2026-2031 strategy. Named "new responsibilities" ("nouvelles responsabilités"), it is based in particular on the complete overhaul of its Jouy-en-Josas campus, the creation of "HEC Institute" to contribute to public debate, and the objective of 25% of students receiving scholarships by 2030 after an increase in tuition fees exceeding 70,000 euros for the Master in management program in the fall of 2025. To achieve these objectives, the foundation intends to raise 300 million euros over five years.

In 2026, HEC welcomes 135 nationalities to its main campus and teaches new subjects such as geopolitics, eloquence, and social sciences.

== Grande École system and Accreditation ==
Degrees (such as the Master in Management or "Grande École program") from HEC Paris are accredited by the Conférence des Grandes écoles and by the Ministry of National Education.

HEC Paris is also triple accredited by the European Foundation for Management Development (EQUIS), the Association to Advance Collegiate Schools of Business (AACSB), and the Association of MBAs (AMBA).

HEC Paris is also one of the founding members of CEMS - Global Alliance in Management Education.

== International rankings ==
Business school rankings

Europe
- QS MBA: 1
- Financial Times MBA: 3

Global
- QS MBA: 5
- Financial Times MBA: 6

Ranking	2021	2022	2023	2024	2025	2026
Business School
FT – European Business Schools	1st	1st	1st	2nd	2nd	
QS (by Subject) – Business & Management Studies	9th	10th	10th	11th	13rd	12th
QS (by Subject) – Accounting and Finance	20th	19th	18th	18th	24th	23rd
Shanghai Ranking (by Subject) – Economics	151-200	151-200	151-200	101-150	151-200	
Shanghai Ranking (by Subject) – Finance	32	28	29	21	29	
Shanghai Ranking (by Subject) – Management	76-100	76-100	101-150	101-150	76-100	
CWUR - World University Rankings	205	266	280	273	334	340
Master in Management
FT – Master in Management	2nd	2nd	1st	2nd	2nd	
QS – Masters in Management	1st	1st	1st	1st	1st	1st
MSc in International Finance
FT – Masters in Finance Pre-Experience	1st	1st	2nd	2nd	5th	7th
QS – Masters in Finance	4th	2nd	1st	1st	2nd	1st
MBA
FT – Global MBA	7th	11th	17th	12th	9th	6th
QS – Full Time MBA	5th	4th	4th	5th	6th	5th
Executive Education
FT – Executive MBA (Trium HEC/LSE/NYU)	5th	6th	4th	5th	6th	
QS – Executive MBA (Trium HEC/LSE/NYU)	1st	1st	1st	1st	1st	1st
FT – Executive MBA (EMBA HEC)	1st	4th	7th	18th	17th	
QS – Executive MBA (EMBA HEC)	1st	2nd	1st	3rd	2nd	2nd
FT – Executive Education – Customized	N/A	1st	3rd	4th	6th	8th
FT – Executive Education – Open	N/A	1st	2nd	1st	2nd	2nd
Specialized Masters
QS – MSc in Strategic Management	1st	1st	1st	1st	1st	1st
QS – MSc in Marketing	1st	1st	1st	1st	1st	1st
QS – MSc in Business Analytics	N/A	3rd	3rd	3rd	3rd	2nd
Innovation & entrepreneurship
FT – Europe’s leading start-up hubs	N/A	N/A	N/A	N/A	4th	8th

== Programs ==
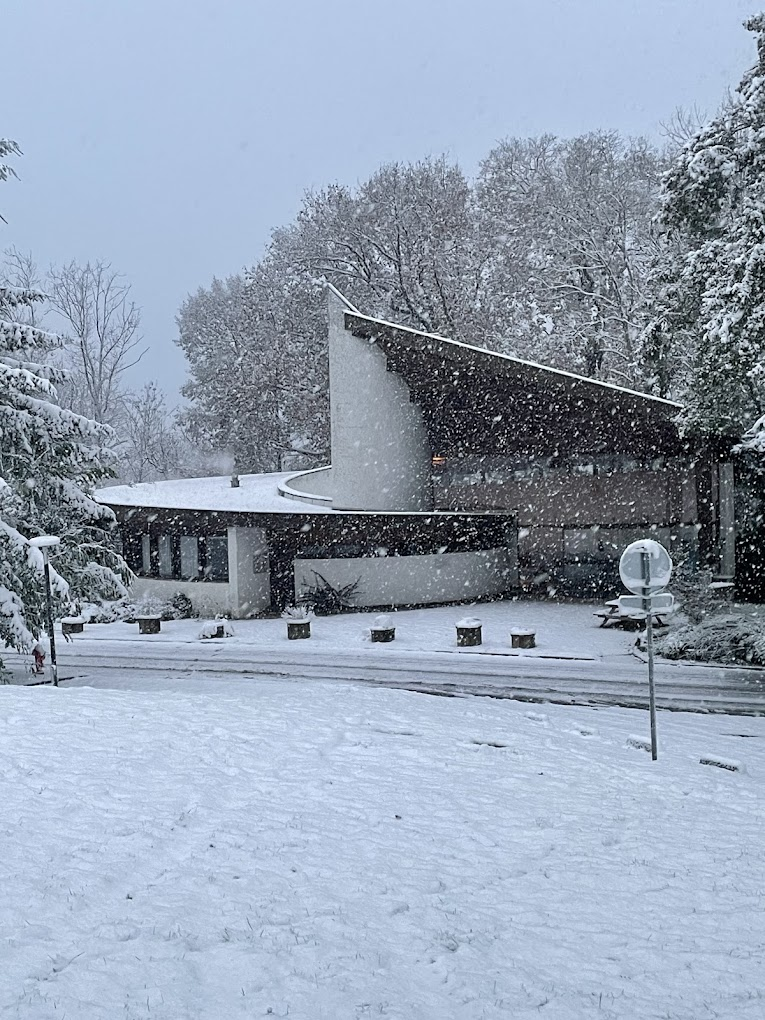
Exterior view of the chapelle de l'Escargot ("Snail Chapel") under the snow in Jouy-en-Josas

Higher education business degrees in France are organized into three levels thus facilitating international mobility: the Licence (Bachelor's), Master's, and Doctorate degrees. A Bachelor's degree requires the completion of 180 ECTS credits (bac + 3); a Master's, requires an additional 120 ECTS credits (bac + 5). HEC Paris offers a bachelor's degree since October 2023.

=== Master in Management – Grande École program ===
Its PGE (Programme Grande École or Grande École program) ends with the awarding of Master's in Management (MiM) degree. Outside of the PGE, students at HEC can be awarded other master's degrees, such as the MBA (bac + 5), or a PhD (bac + 8).

=== Bachelor in Data, Society and Organisations ===
Announced in October 2023, the school offers a Bachelor of Arts in partnership with Bocconi University in Milan. Focused on Data, Society & Organizations, it combines data sciences and social sciences. Students spend the first three semesters in Italy and the last three in France on the Jouy-en-Josas campus. At the end of the program, students obtain a double degree: the Bocconi Bachelor of Science in International Politics and Government, and the HEC Paris Bachelor of Arts and Sciences.

=== CPES Data Science, Society and Health ===
HEC Paris is one of the three founding institutions of the Cycle pluridisciplinaire d’études supérieures (CPES) in Data Science, Society and Health, a selective three-year undergraduate program created in 2023. The degree is jointly delivered by Université Paris-Saclay, Institut Polytechnique de Paris and HEC Paris. Recognized by the French Ministry of Higher Education, it confers the national grade de licence (Bachelor's level) to its graduates. The curriculum combines mathematics, computer science, statistics, social sciences and public health, and includes interdisciplinary projects taught across the three institutions.

=== MSc in International Finance (MIF) ===
The MSc in International Finance is ranked #5 worldwide for pre-experience programs (2025 FT Rankings).

=== Master of Business Administration (MBA) ===
The MBA program, created in 1969, has two intakes: September and January. HEC's MBA consists of a 16-month-long curriculum, with 8 months of core courses and 8 months of a customized program, including several specialization options, exchange programs, and fieldwork projects. A typical class is composed of some 250 students – 90% of whom are international students – with more than 52 nationalities represented in the 2017 graduating class. The selection process seeks a balance between academic achievement, professional experience, international exposure, and personal motivation. Knowledge of French is not an entry requirement, but participants are highly encouraged to have a basic knowledge of French by the start of the MBA Program, while mandatory (during the first two core terms) and optional language courses are offered throughout the program. Exchange and dual degree programs are offered with about 40 international partner business schools, including the Singapore Management University, HKUST, London Business School, Columbia Business School, Wharton, and Yale.

=== Executive education ===
==== Executive MSc Innovation and Entrepreneurship ====
The Executive MSc Innovation & Entrepreneurship is a program created by HEC Paris and delivered partly on Coursera. 100% online, it takes 18 months. The first students were admitted in March 2017.

==== Executive MBA ====
Formerly (until 2002) Centre de perfectionnement aux affaires, the HEC Executive MBA is a program for top executives with a minimum of 8 years of corporate experience, which prepares them for general management positions (the average background experience of students is about 14 years). The Executive MBA is a multi-site program offered in Paris (France), Beijing (China), St Petersburg (Russia) and Doha (Qatar). The courses are split between theory, case studies, strategic projects, leadership training, EU community campus and foreign exchanges in the US and Asia. Program partnering universities are NYU, UCLA, Babson College in the US, Tsinghua University in China and Nihon University in Japan.

==== TRIUM Global Executive MBA ====
HEC also offers the TRIUM Global Executive MBA degree jointly with Stern School of Business of NYU and the London School of Economics. Stern brings its expertise in finance, the LSE its expertise in economy and geopolitics, and HEC its specialization in marketing and strategy. Each class had approximately 80 participants in 2016. The average age of students was 40 in 2014. This diploma is ranked 6th among Executive MBAs in the Financial Times' 2025 rankings. It is divided into six modules that are held in five international business locations over 16 months : Africa, America, Asia, Europe and the Middle East.

== Admissions ==
2018 Admission Statistics
Procedure	Applicants	Admitted	Acceptance Rate (%)
Grande Ecole (Master in Management)
Classes préparatoires (French concours, students enter in L3)	5,151	382	7.4%
French dual degree (students from French partner institutions)	421	82	19.5%
Direct admissions (students enter in M1)	6,520	271	4.2%
Total	12,092	735	6%
MBA
Total	2,231	391	17.5%

== Ranking ==
It has been ranked as one of the best schools to study business and management in the world, with most of its masters ranked 1 or 2 in the world in the rankings, including but not limited to QS World Ranking, Le Figaro and Financial Times rankings. Namely, its master in finance is ranked 1 in the world above MIT and University of Oxford, which occupy number 3 and 2 respectively. At the same time, its master in management program is one of the most selective programs for international students, only accepting around 4 percent of applicants and it occupy the number 1 master in management in the world according to multiple rankings, owing the title of the best university/school to study in France and Europe according to rankings.

== Massive online open courses ==
HEC Paris is also participating in the new wave of distance learning, by creating its own online training courses via MOOCs available on Coursera.

== Research and entrepreneurship ==
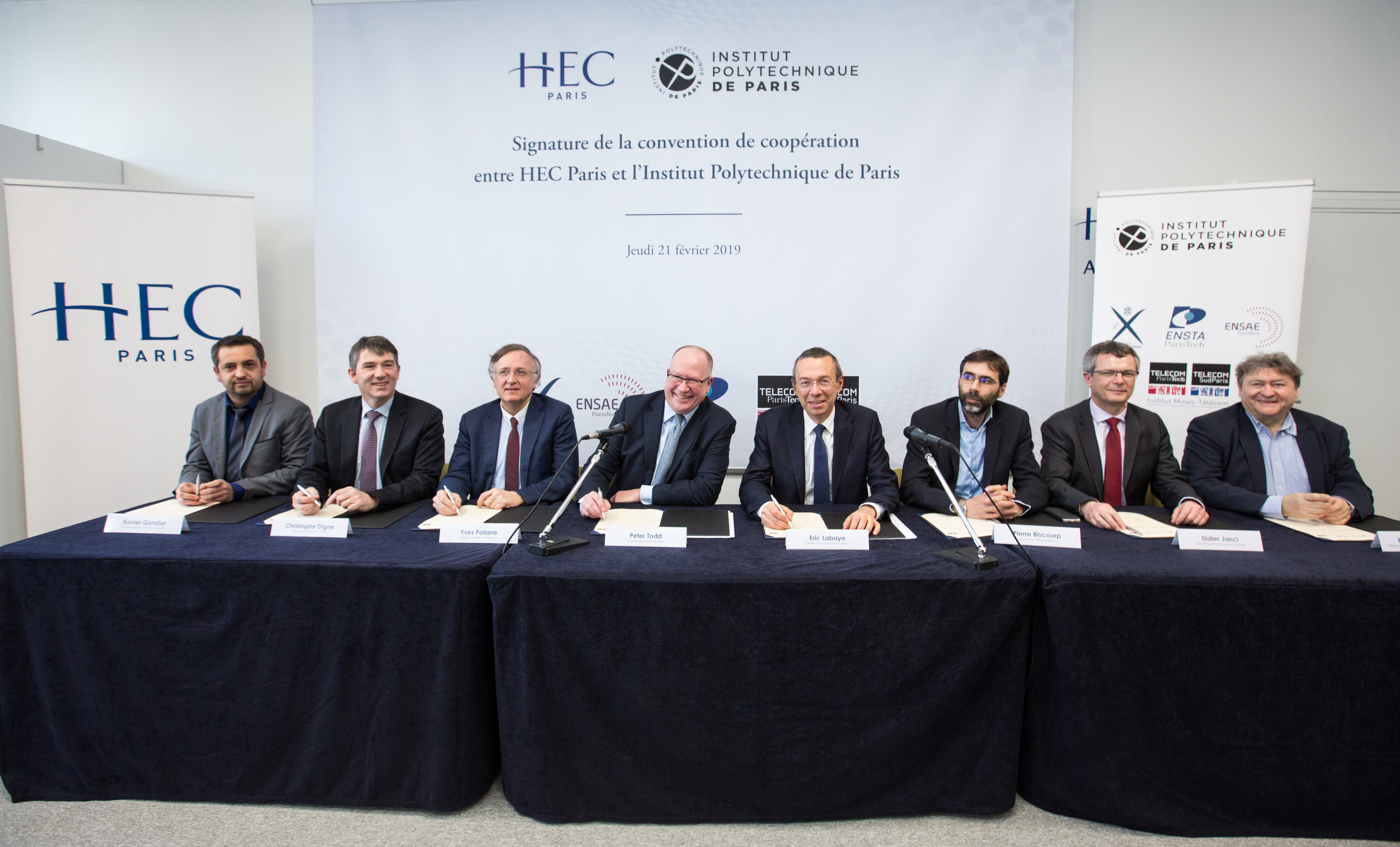
The Cooperation Agreement between HEC Paris and the Institut Polytechnique de Paris (IP Paris) signed on February 21, 2019.

HEC Paris has several centres of research:

- Hi! PARIS CENTER – A collaboration with the Institut Polytechnique de Paris (IP Paris), this interdisciplinary and inter-institutional centre combines education, research and innovation to investigate the major challenges surrounding digital transformation and its impact on companies and society at large. This Center combines the 300 researchers and infrastructures of IP Paris and HEC Paris.
- Society & Organizations Institute – an interdisciplinary Institute that brings together over 60 professors to research, teach and implement ideas in sustainability and inclusion.
- GREGHEC – The Groupement de Recherche et d’Etudes en Gestion à HEC Paris is a joint research laboratory focused on economics and management in France.
- Innovation & Entrepreneurship Institute – 20 partnerships of excellence; 400 projects supported each year; an ecosystem of 400 professors, researchers and recognized experts.

The school has been offering a degree in entrepreneurship for more than 40 years, by creating HEC Entrepreneurs in 1977, which has today become the MSc X-HEC Entrepreneurs, in partnership with École Polytechnique. Between 2004 and 2013, the percentage of entrepreneurs per class jumped from 10% to 25%. In 2007, HEC Paris created Incubateur HEC Paris, its startup incubator dedicated to supporting alumni-created startups. Currently directed by Antoine Leprêtre, the incubator has been part of the Station F campus since 2017. Since 2017, the school has also an online master's degree dedicated to this topic.

=== HEC Paris Innovation and Entrepreneurship Institute ===
Logo of the HEC Paris Innovation & Entrepreneurship Institute

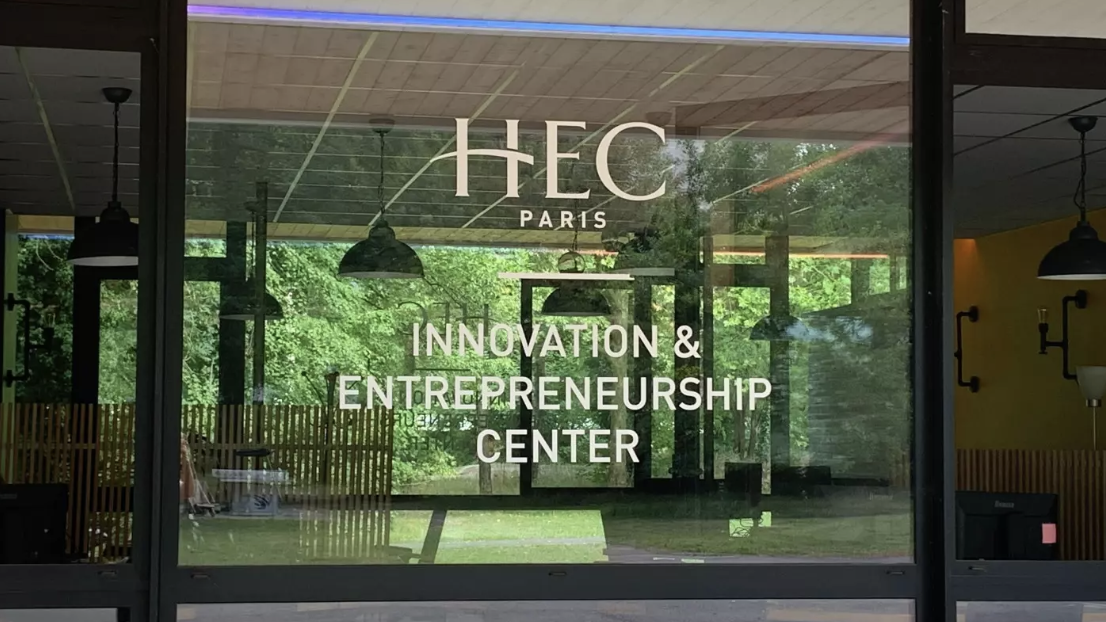
Main entrance of the HEC Paris Innovation & Entrepreneurship Institute

The HEC Paris Innovation & Entrepreneurship Institute is an institute created to promote Innovation and Entrepreneurship at HEC Paris. The institute is part of Station F and is located both in Paris and Jouy-en-Josas. Around 500 students are enrolled in classes over the three degrees (Master of Science X-HEC Entrepreneurs; Master of Science in Innovation and Entrepreneurship and Executive Master of Science in Innovation an Entrepreneurship) of the school year. The institute works with the Polytechnic Institute of Paris (more specifically École polytechnique) and Coursera. Courses taught through the institute include Creativity, Global Entrepreneurship, Entrepreneurial Marketing, New Venture Creation, Venture Finance, Entrepreneurial Selling and social entrepreneurship.

The institute has several programs for undergraduate and graduate students as well as for faculty to promote the concept of entrepreneurship. Several initiatives that the institute has started has raised awareness for both entrepreneurship and innovation in both the community of Jouy-en-Josas and throughout the country.

The institute is ranked eighth in the Financial Times "Europe's leading start-up hubs" ranking 2026.

In 2026, the Managing Director of the Institute is Inge Kerkloh-Devif.

==== Events and activities ====
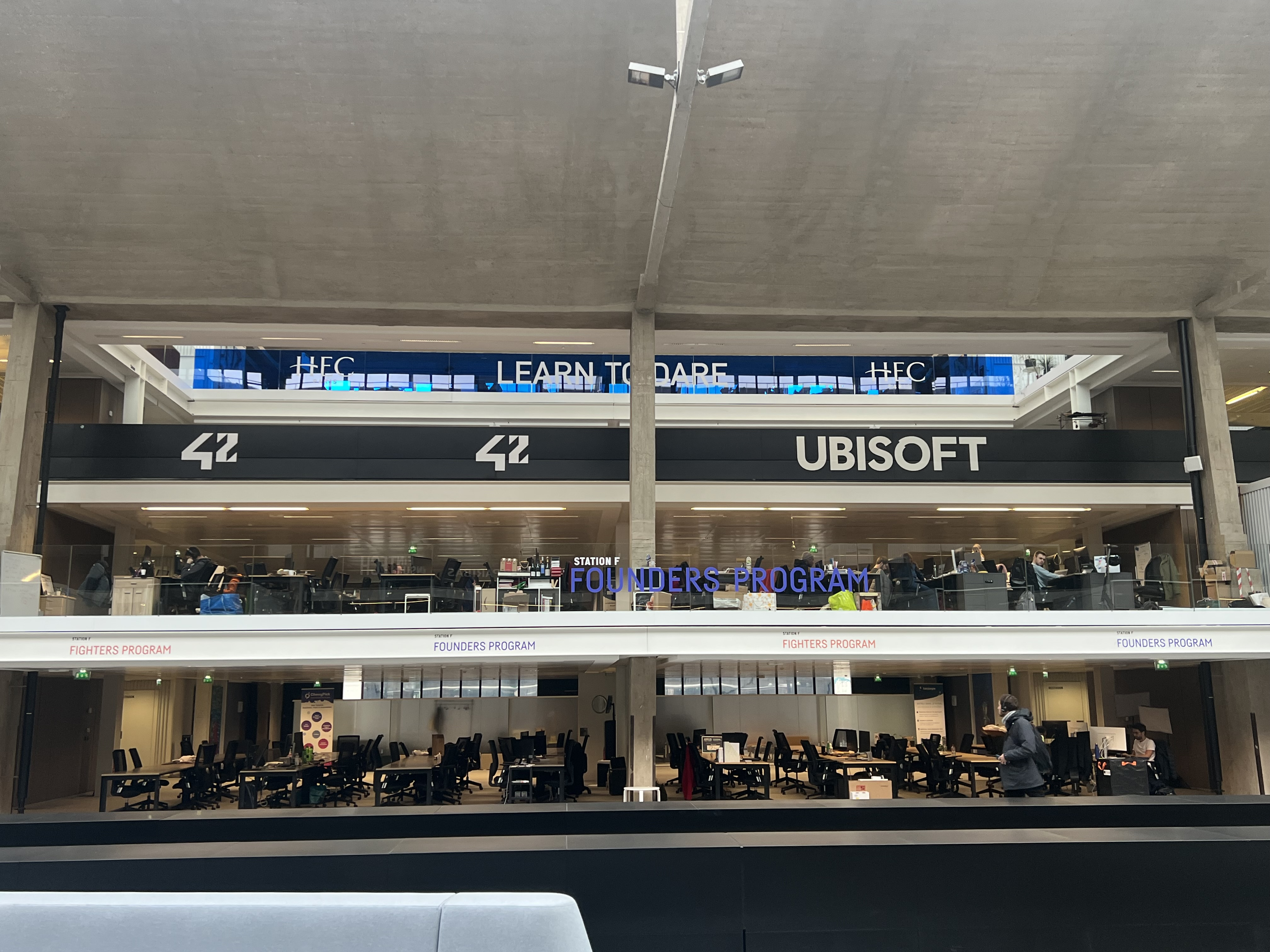
HEC Paris Incubator

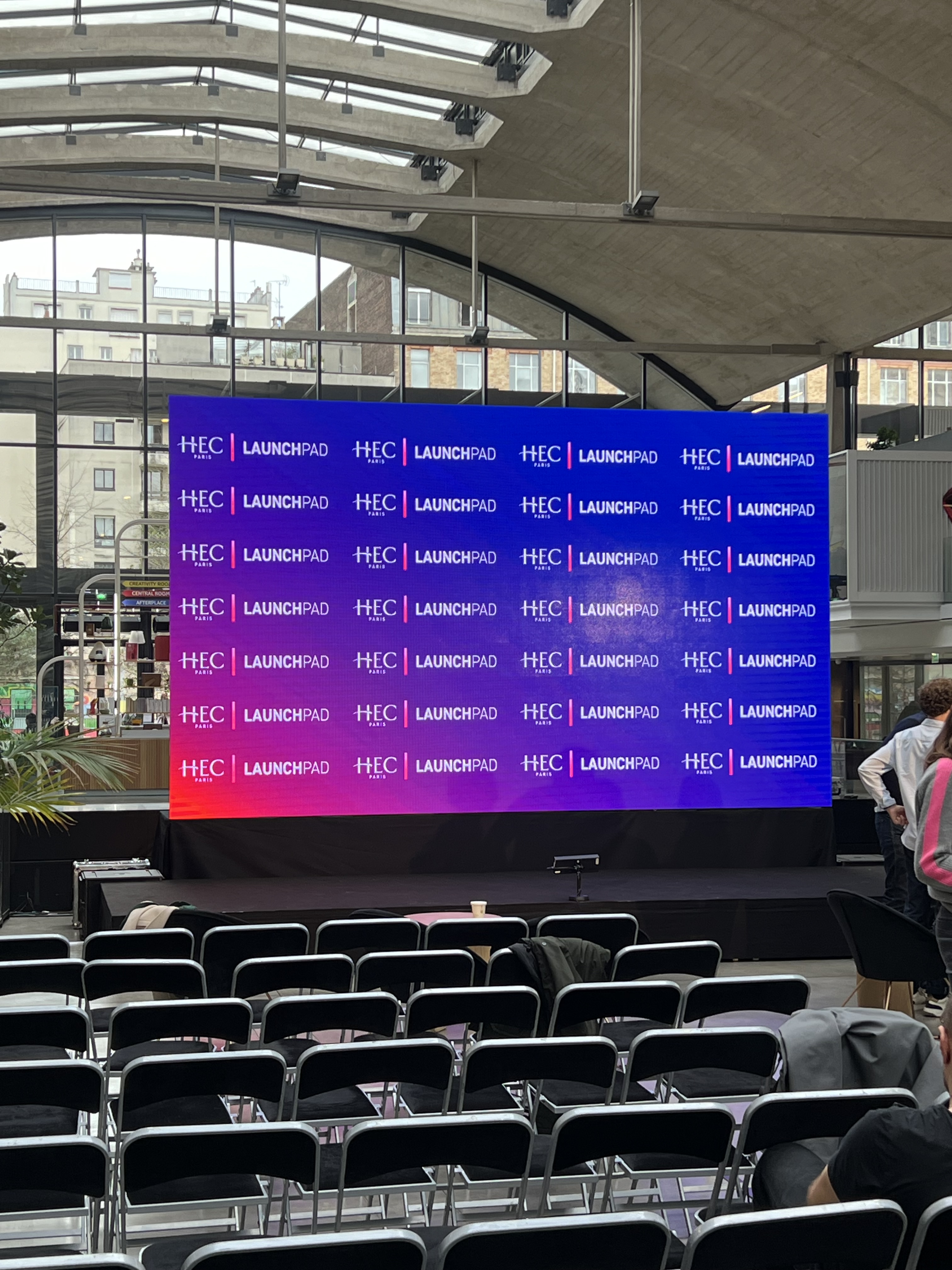
HEC Paris Startup Launchpad Demo Day 2024 at Station F

- Accélérateur ESS
- Post incubation
- HECTAR Accelerator L'Oréal Beauty Tech
- Meta X L'Oréal Accelerator Icade startup studio
- Incubateur HEC Paris
- Data for Managers
- HEC Startup Launchpad HEC Challenge +
- HEC Challenge + Afrique
- Igniting Innovation
- CDL – Creative Destruction Lab
- HEC Stand Up
- MOOCs
- Entrepreneurship & Digital Innovation
- HEC–TUM Summer Program
- Startup Sprint

In 2013, HEC launched the "HEC Stand Up" program to support women entrepreneurs. It is designed for women wishing to develop an entrepreneurial project or create a business, regardless of age or background. Free of charge, it offers a blended learning program of approximately ten weeks, combining online learning, practical application, and in-person sessions. The program is based on three progressive modules aimed at developing an entrepreneurial mindset, navigating the market, and structuring a business plan. Upon completion of the program, participants obtain a certificate issued by HEC Paris. The program has been implemented in several regions of France and in its overseas territories.

== Student life ==
=== Campuses ===
==== France ====
HEC is located on a 110-hectare campus in Jouy-en-Josas, 16 km (10 miles) southwest of central Paris, close to Versailles. Jouy-en-Josas is served by the RER Parisian suburban train and the local bus service. The campus is built around the 19th-century Château de Jouy, which is currently used for Executive Education classes.

==== Qatar ====
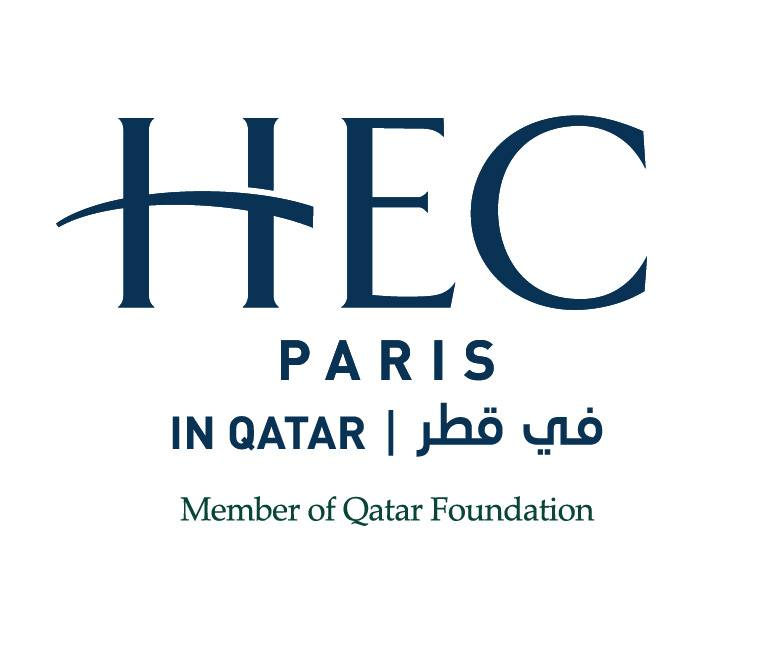
HEC Paris in Qatar

HEC Paris, Doha, formerly HEC Paris in Qatar, is a remote campus of HEC Paris, located in Doha, the capital of Qatar. HEC Paris, Doha, is the result of an agreement between HEC Paris and the Qatar Foundation.

HEC Paris, Doha, campus is located in the Tornado Tower in the heart of the West Bay financial centre of the city of Doha. HEC Qatar offers four types of programs, including an Executive MBA and a Mastère spécialisé program.

==== United Kingdom ====
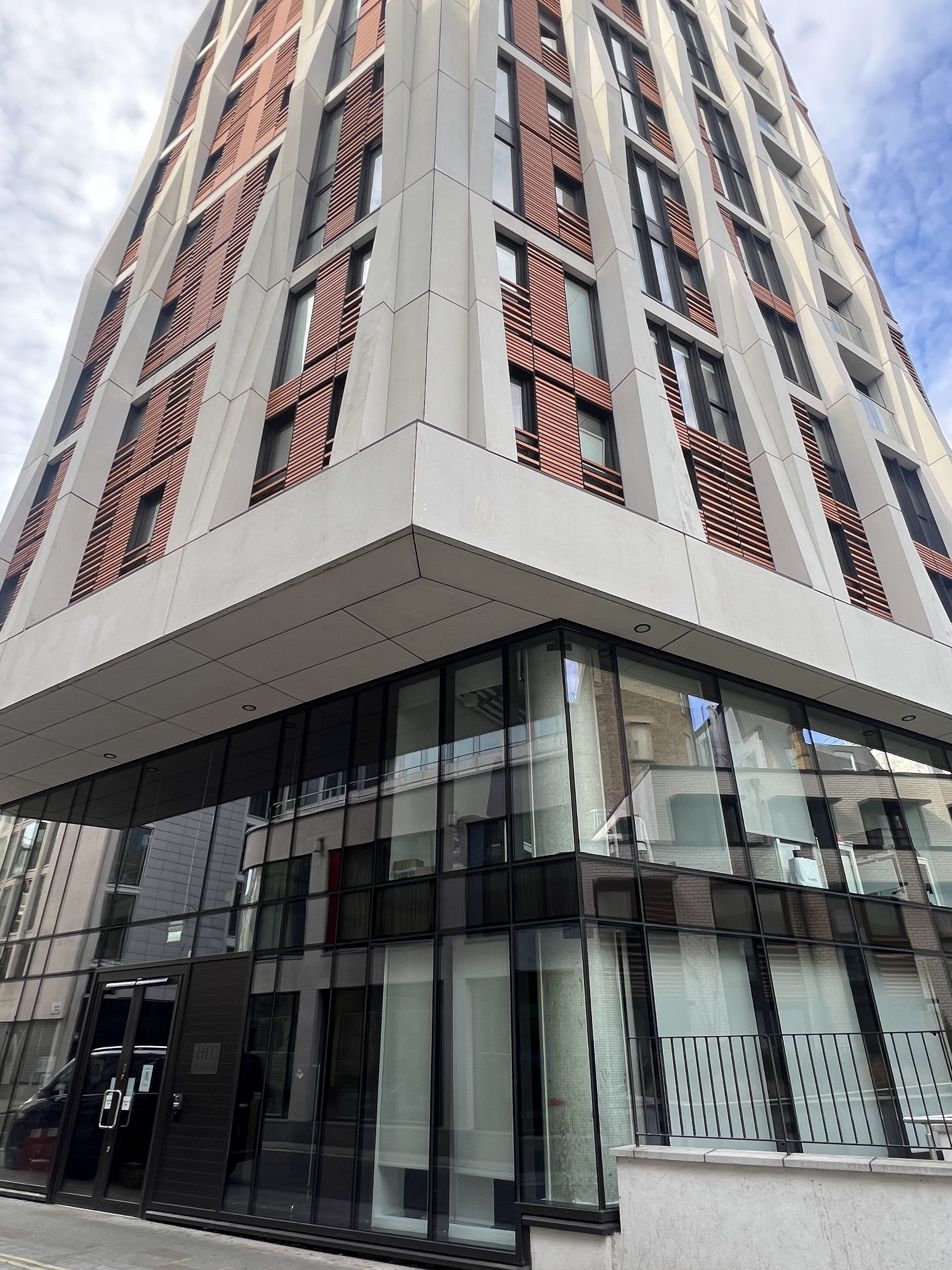
HEC UK House in London

The HEC UK House was inaugurated in March 2023 in London. Close to Covent Garden, the campus is dedicated to the alumni network and conferences. It also has a library and a creative lab.

==== Ivory Coast ====
In 2018, HEC Paris opened a campus in Abidjan, Ivory Coast. The school trains approximately one hundred executives each year in the fields of finance, business strategy, and innovation.

HEC also announced in 2023 its intention to support the development of entrepreneurship in Africa by mentoring 1,000 projects over five years.

=== Alumni association ===
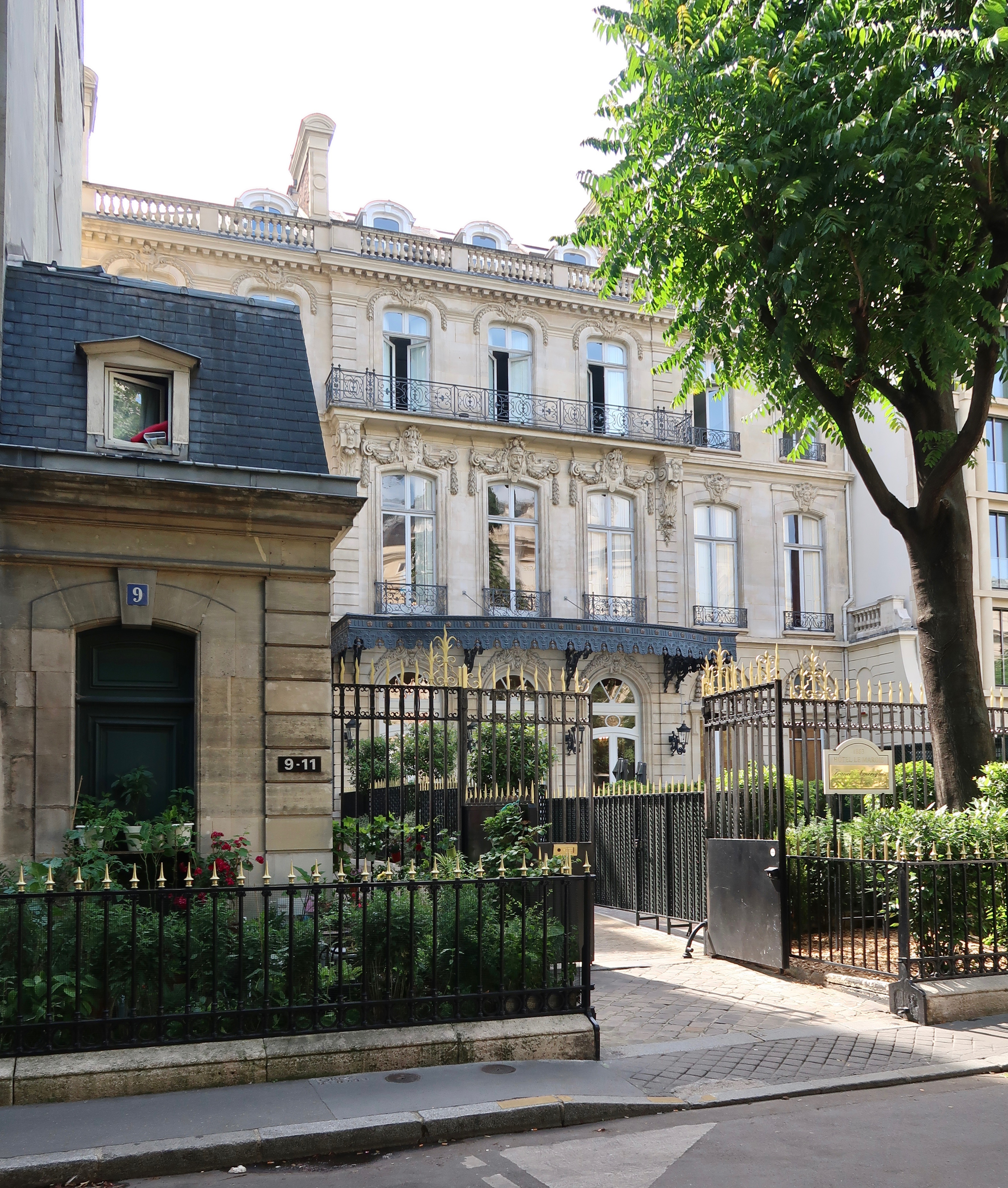
The HEC Alumni headquarters are located in the Hôtel Le Marois in Paris

The school alumni association, Association des diplômés HEC Paris, was founded in 1883 and gathers alumni of the different institutions of the HEC Group: École HEC Paris, MBA HEC Paris, HEC Paris Executive MBA, Mastères HEC Paris and Doctorat HEC Paris. Each degree is associated with a letter and the year of graduation. In 2017, HEC Alumni were ranked by The Economist as the 2nd most powerful business school alumni network in the world.

== Notable alumni ==
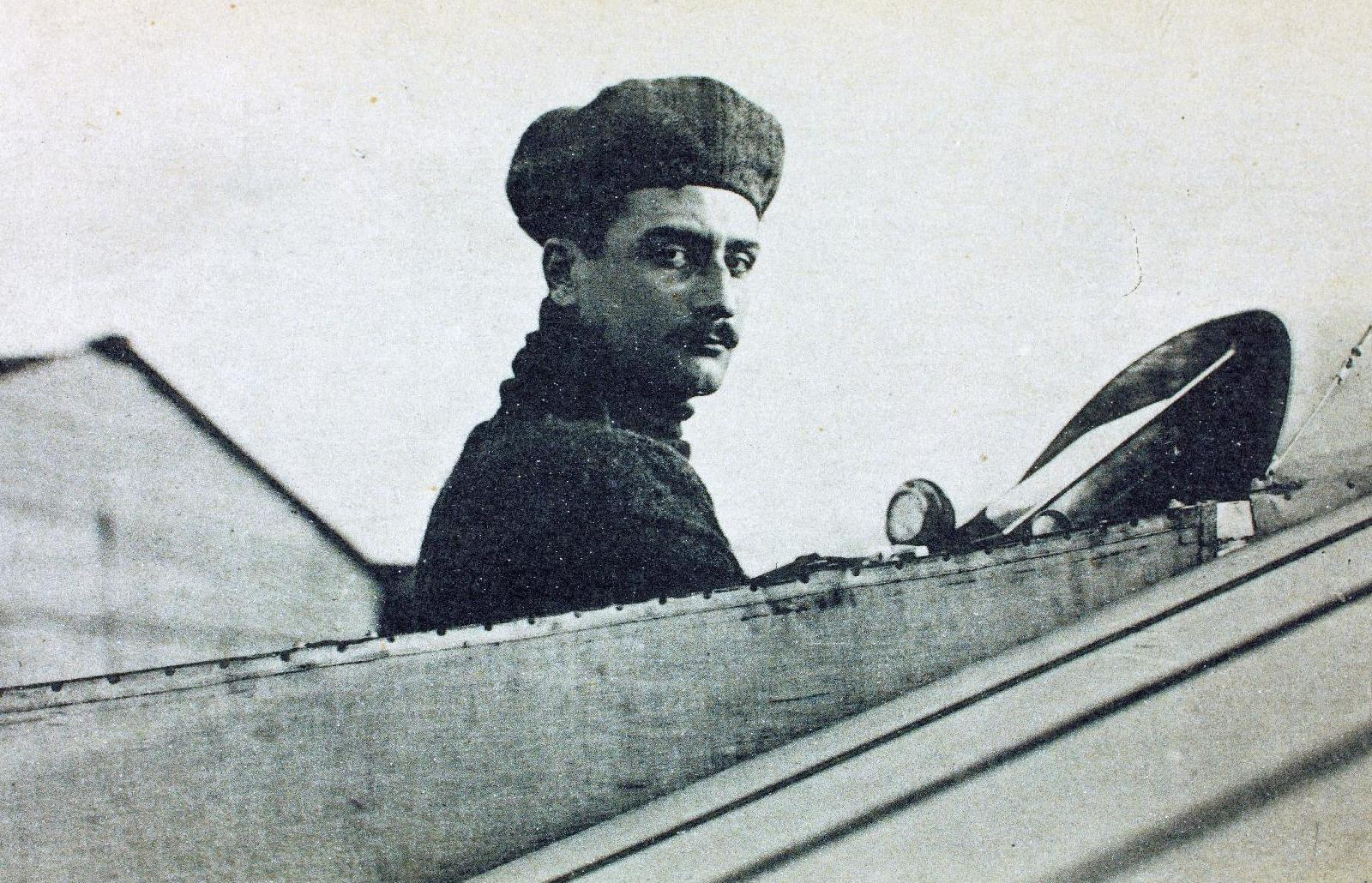
Roland Garros, HEC 1908, aviation pioneer and fighter pilot.

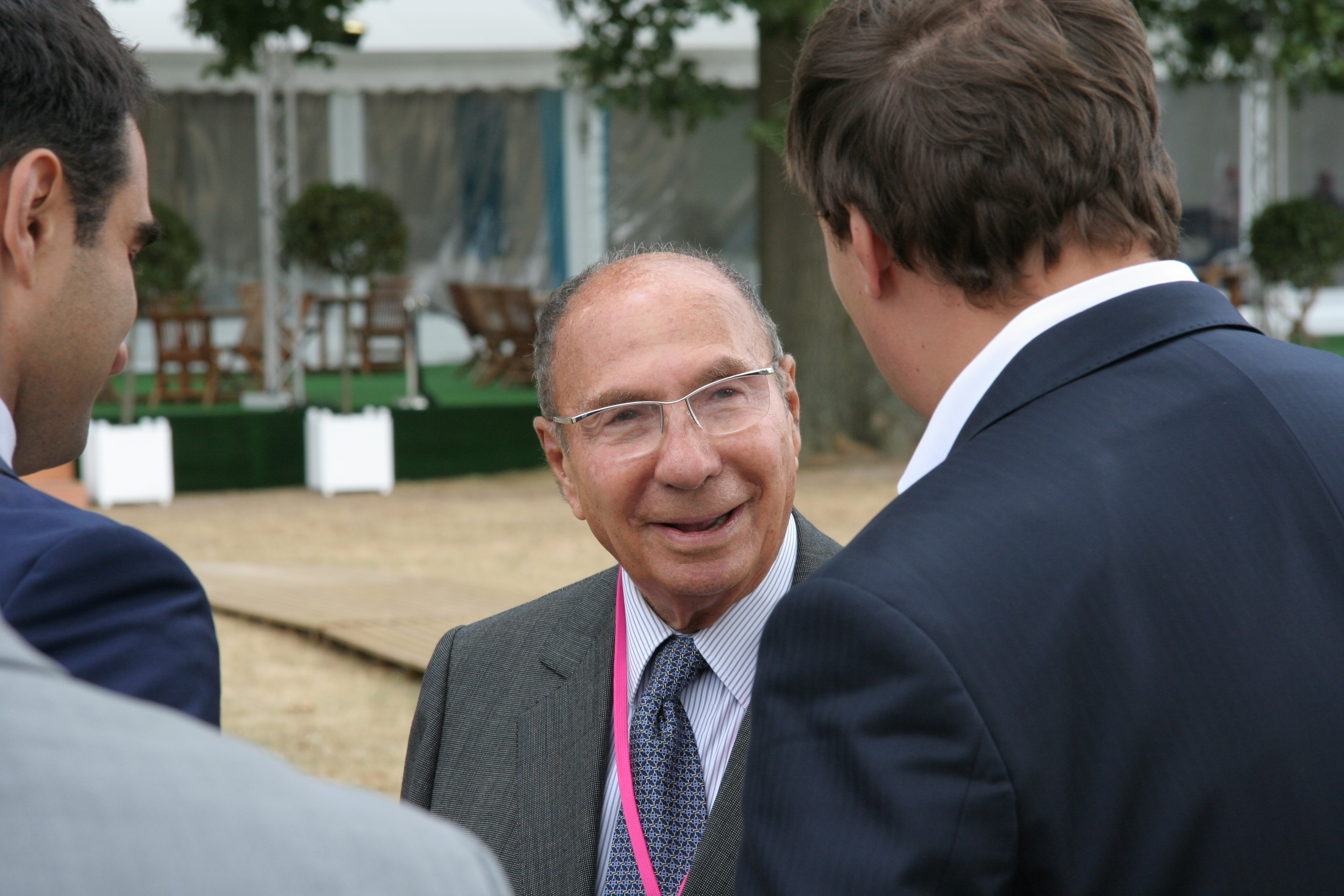
Serge Dassault, EMBA 1963, chairman and chief executive officer of Dassault Group.

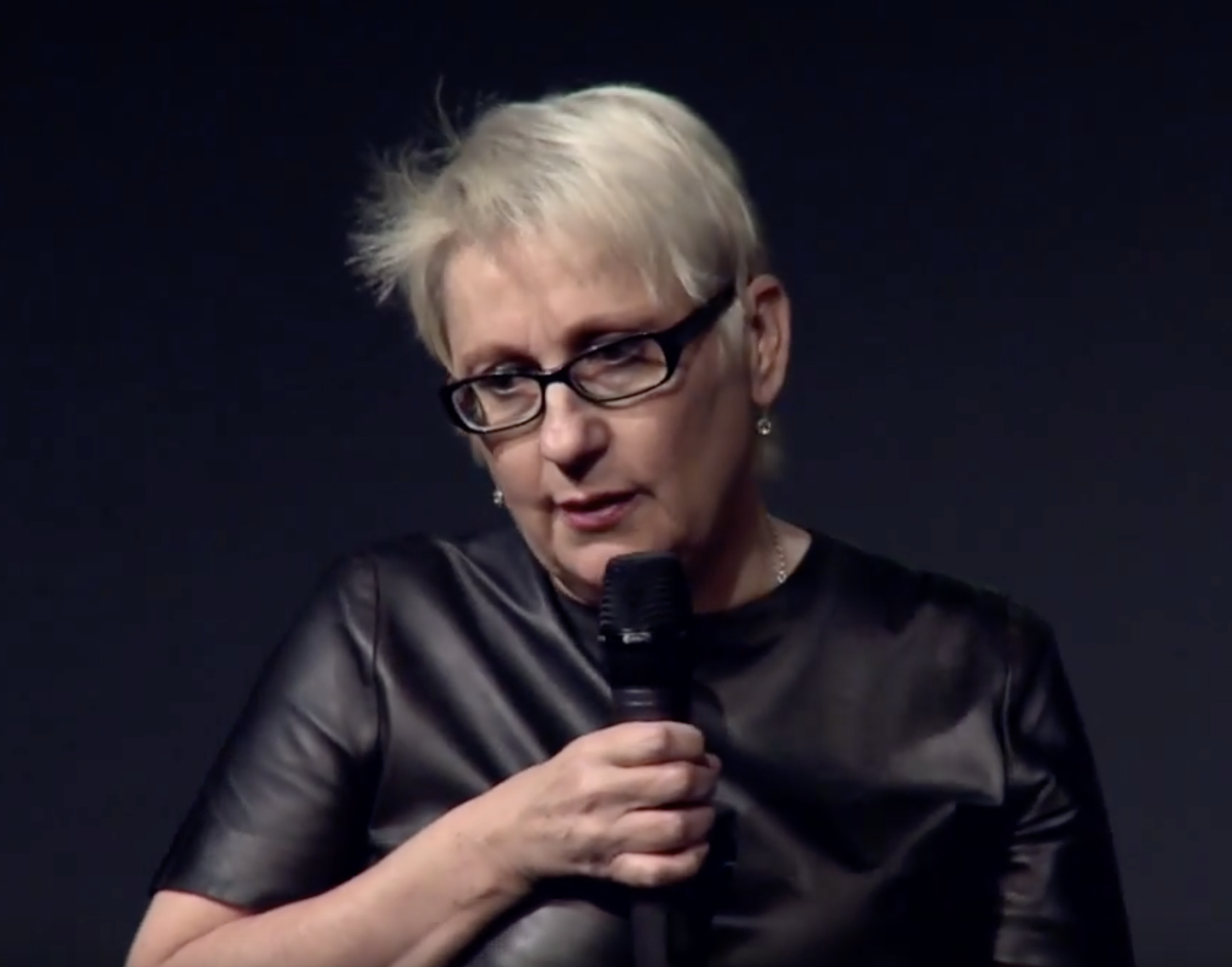
Mercedes Erra, HEC 1981, Executive President of Havas Creative.

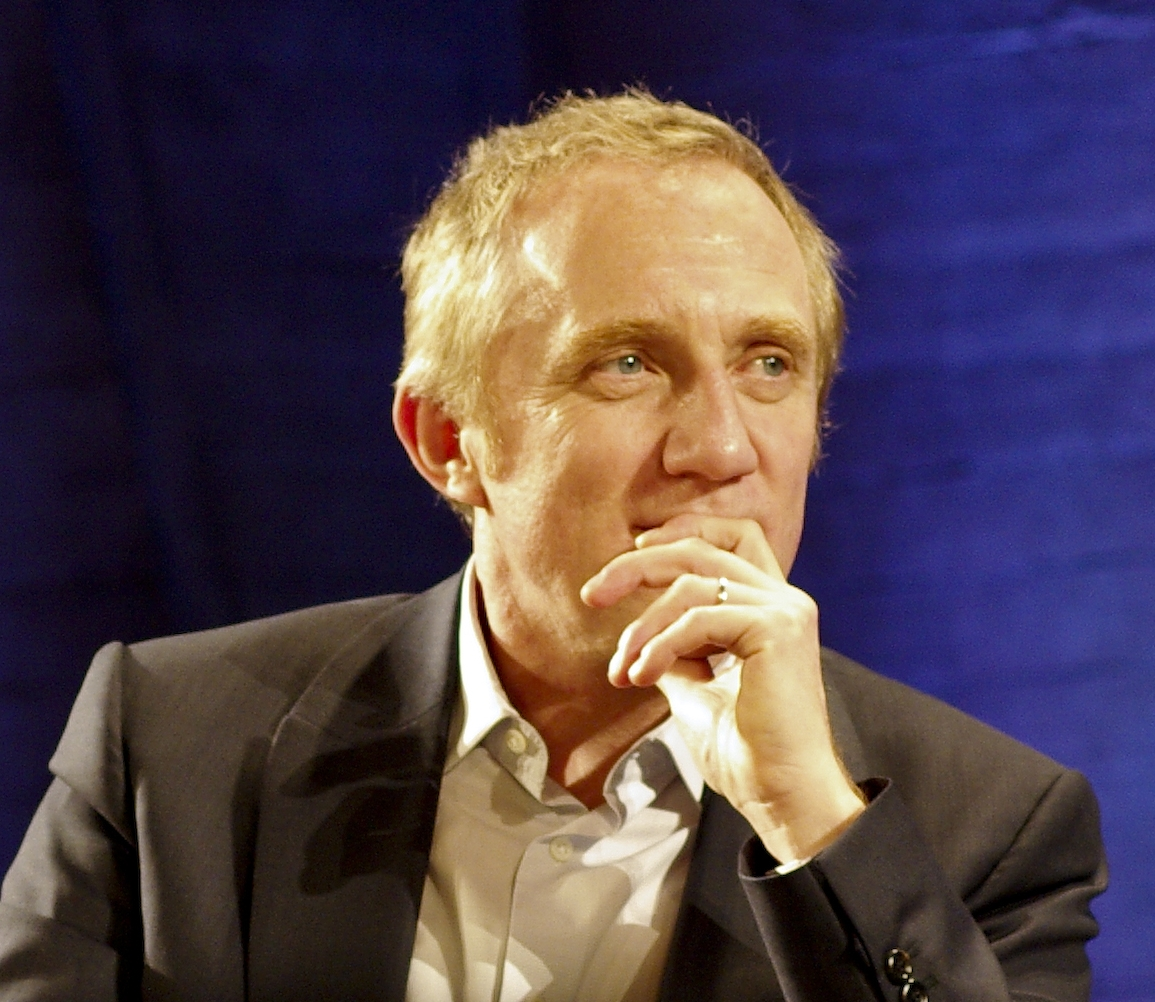
François-Henri Pinault, HEC 1985, CEO of Kering.

HEC Paris has one of the largest and most influential alumni networks in Europe, with more than 80,000 graduates across over 135 countries. Its alumni have held leading positions in business, finance, entrepreneurship, public administration, and international organizations. HEC graduates have served as chief executives of major multinational corporations, including several companies listed on the CAC 40, and have played prominent roles in the development of France's entrepreneurial and investment ecosystem. The school's alumni community includes business leaders such as François-Henri Pinault, Jean-Paul Agon, Mercedes Erra, and Stéphane Richard, as well as numerous founders, investors, senior civil servants, and political figures.

== Notable faculty ==
HEC Paris welcomes notable faculty members like François Baroin (French Finance Minister from 2011 to 2012), Jean-Louis Borloo (French Ministry) or Noëlle Lenoir (French Minister for European Affairs from 2002 to 2004).

== In popular culture ==
The institution is featured in many works. Association of Wrongdoers, a 1987 film by Claude Zidi, features former students.

== See also ==
- Education in France
- Grandes écoles
- List of HEC Paris people
