= Rocard government =

Rocard governments
- 20th and 21st Government of France

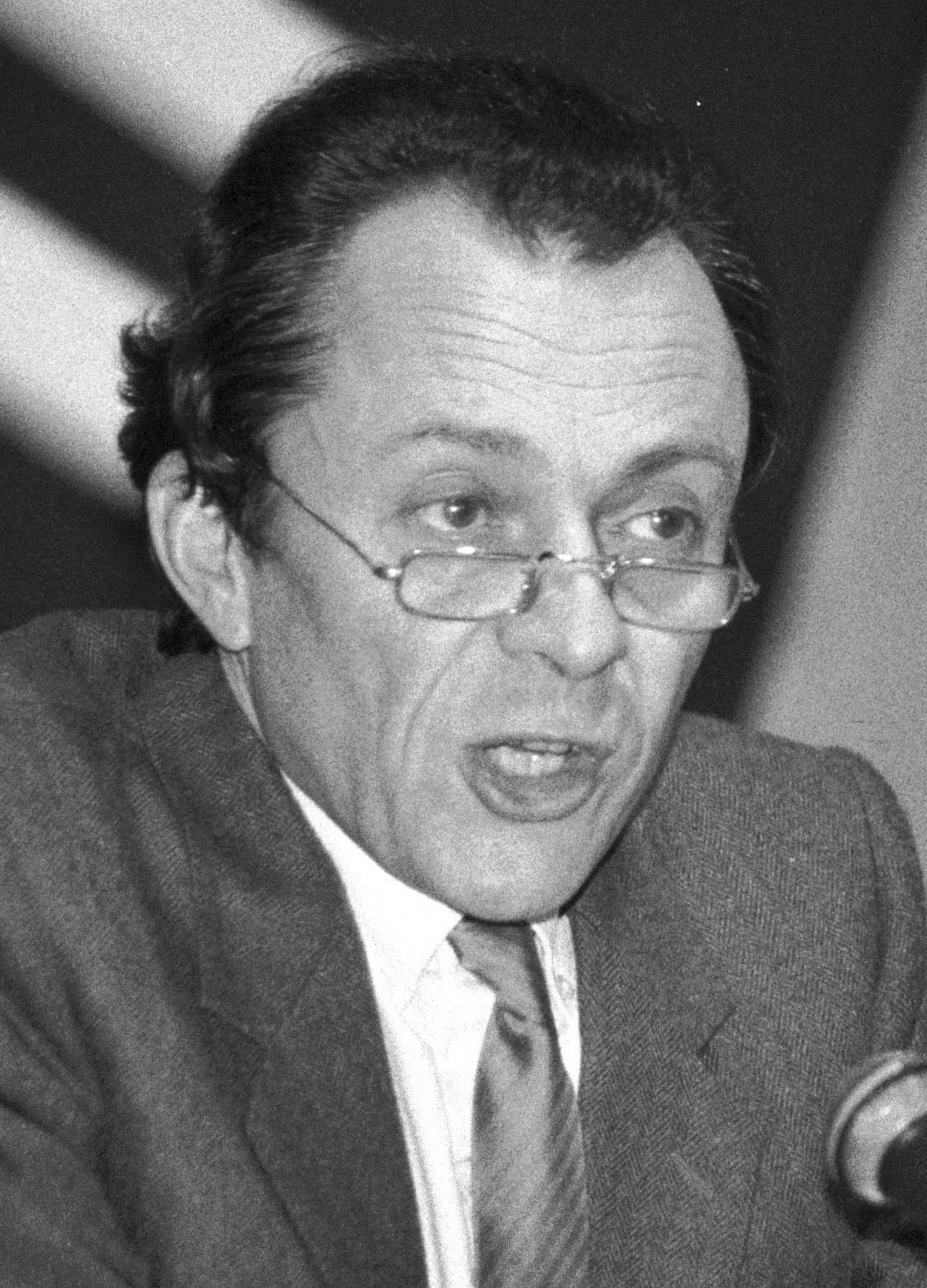
- Michel Rocard
- Date formed: 10 May 1988
- Date dissolved: 15 May 1991

People and organisations
- Head of state: François Mitterrand
- Head of government: Michel Rocard
- No. of ministers: 20
- Member parties: Socialist Party

History
- Predecessor: Second Chirac government
- Successor: Cresson government

The Rocard government was the Government of France headed by Prime Minister Michel Rocard. It was originally formed on 10 May 1988 by the presidential decree of President François Mitterrand. It was composed of members from the Socialist Party. The second Rocard government was dissolved on 15 May 1991 when Édith Cresson was chosen by Mitterrand to form the next cabinet.

== Cabinet ==
- Michel Rocard – Prime Minister
- Roland Dumas – Minister of Foreign Affairs
- Édith Cresson – Minister of European Affairs
- Jean-Pierre Chevènement – Minister of Defense
- Pierre Joxe – Minister of the Interior
- Pierre Bérégovoy – Minister of Economy, Finance, Budget, and Privatization
- Roger Fauroux – Minister of Industry
- Michel Delebarre – Minister of Employment and Social Affairs
- Pierre Arpaillange – Minister of Justice
- Lionel Jospin – Minister of National Education, Sport, Research, and Technology
- Jack Lang – Minister of Culture and Communication
- Henri Nallet – Minister of Agriculture and Forests
- Maurice Faure – Minister of Housing and Equipment
- Louis Mermaz – Minister of Transport
- Jean Poperen – Minister of Relations with Parliament
- Jacques Pelletier – Minister of Cooperation and Development
- Paul Quilès – Minister of Posts, Telecommunications, and Space
- Michel Durafour – Minister of Civil Service
- Roger Fauroux – Minister of External Commerce
- Louis Le Pensec – Minister of Sea
- Brice Lalonde – Minister of the Environment

Changes

- 22–23 June 1988 – Michel Delebarre succeeds Mermaz as Minister of Transport and Le Pensec as Minister of Sea. The office of Minister of Social Affairs is abolished, but Claude Evin enters the ministry as Minister of Solidarity, Health, and Social Protection. Jean-Pierre Soisson succeeds Delebarre as Minister of Employment, becoming also Minister of Labour and Vocational Training. Louis Le Pensec becomes Minister of Overseas Departments and Territories. Jean-Marie-Rausch succeeds Fauroux as Minister of External Commerce. Hubert Curien succeeds Jospin as Minister of Research and Technology. Jospin remains Minister of National Education and Sport. Michel Durafour becomes Minister of Administrative Reforms as well as Minister of Civil Service.
- 28 June 1988 – Jack Lang becomes Minister of Great Works and Bicentenary in addition to being Minister of Culture and Communication.
- 22 February 1989 – Michel Delebarre succeeds Faure as Minister of Housing and Equipment, remaining also Minister of Transport.
- 2 October 1990 – The office of Minister of European Affairs is abolished. Henri Nallet succeeds Arpaillange as Minister of Justice. Louis Mermaz succeeds Nallet as Minister of Agriculture and Forests. The office of Minister of Bicentenary is abolished. Jack Lang remains minister of Culture, Communication and Great Works.
- 21 December 1990 – Michel Delebarre becomes Minister of City. Louis Besson succeeds Delebarre as Minister of Transport, Housing, Sea, and Equipment.
- 29 January 1991 – Pierre Joxe succeeds Chevènement as Minister of Defense. Philippe Marchand succeeds Joxe as Minister of the Interior.

== Policies ==
=== Working conditions ===
In August 1988, the Rocard Government promulgated a decree-law strengthening the penalties for the employment of children. A decree of November 1988 defined technical terms and laid down rules governing the general conditions with which installations must comply regarding the protection of workers in establishments using electrical currents. The Arrete of December 1988 set up panels of three doctors with specialist knowledge of the diseases caused by dust containing free silica, asbestos or iron oxide, who were required to consider each case and deliver an opinion. Another Arrete of December 1988 set out the characteristics for the trademark and the certificate of conformity required for dangerous machines and equipment.

The Arrete of January 1989 provided for special medical surveillance of workers assigned to workplaces with a daily noise exposure of 85 decibels or above. Recommendations and technical Instructions for occupational physicians performing such medical surveillance are laid down in a document specifying the nature and frequency of the examinations. A Decree of February 1989 laid down the safety and health requirements in relation to powered Industrial trucks and their equipment. The Arrete of April 1989 stipulated that occupational physicians should produce each year a schedule of activities based on employees' health and health requirements. The Arrete covered health risks, workplaces and working conditions and specified the studies to be undertaken and the minimum number and frequency of inspection visits to workplaces. In the same field, the Arrete of May 1989 stipulated that occupational physicians In enterprises and establishments with more than 10 employees must compile and keep up-to-date a register listing the occupational hazards in the enterprise and the numbers of employees exposed to such hazards. The register was to be transmitted to the employer, kept at the disposal of the administration, and presented to the works committee for safety, health and working conditions at the same time as the annual report. A law passed in August 1989 amended a scheme introduced under a law on redundancy passed in 1986. The new law introduced a "prevention" element providing for aid to encourage firms to provide facilities for retraining workers and for conducting economic audits in small and medium-sized firms. There was also a "procedure" element providing for the works council to be kept informed and to be consulted, while the obligation to implement redeployment and retraining agreements was made generally applicable to all cases of redundancy for economic reasons. Regarding individual dismissals, the legislation aimed to put an end to certain fraudulent practices detrimental to workers (e.g. reducing working time before dismissing a worker so as to circumvent the need to give notice). The law also set out methods of calculating the special award payable to workers who lost their jobs as a result of an accident or an occupational illness. Facilities for assistance for workers called to an interview prior to dismissal were also included.

In 1990, in an effort to give new impetus to the collective bargaining process and to bring it into line with increases in actual wages, a goal was set up Rocard and his ministers to raise “collectively agreed minimum pay rates". This was based on a study of 164 sectors in both the "general" category (excluding metalworking) and in the metalworking category, each employing more than 10,000 workers. In 1997, however, it was found that only 38% of the "general" sectors had "complied" with the stated goals (i.e. all pay levels were higher than the SMIC), down from 41% in 1990. In metalworking, the proportion of "complying" sectors was only 11%, down from 29% in 1990.

In 1989, some restrictions were re-imposed on the ability of employers and workers to agree to temporary work contracts. A plan to encourage household savings was launched, while ALMP (Active Labour Market Policies) were expanded, notably public internships, training programmes, and subsidies for hard-to-place youths and the long-term unemployed. In addition, more money was spent on research.

The credit-formation was introduced, a voucher aimed at individuals who sought a general upgrading of their technical education. This was directed towards young school-leavers without a diploma, and anyone out of school was eligible for the voucher. The credit-formation was intended to enable individuals to reach the first rank of technical education (the certificate d'aptitude professionnelle, or CAP). Participants would work with counsellors to determine needs and desired training, and they would then be eligible for training in approved centres. In addition, the Ministry of Education would certify levels of skills acquisition. The credit formation was extended after a collective bargaining accord in March 1990 to workers who were employed but unskilled, and in May that year to a third category of workers, unemployed adults. A firm-based version of this programme was also established by the Rocard Government, known as the credit-impot formation. In explaining the purpose of this scheme, Anthony Daley noted that

“Firms could apply those funds to youth training. If they were insufficient, the firm could deduct twenty-five percent of the extra amount from its corporate taxes. For individuals with particularly low skill levels, the company's deduction rose to thirty-five percent. Training could take place in the plant or in a certified training centre.”

A law of July 1989 on collective working relations provides for the extension to men of advantages reserved for women in certain collective agreements, with this extension to be negotiated within a period of two years, laid down the methods for informing the works committee about vocational training matters, extended the category of staff representatives with a right to remuneration, and strengthened the sanctions applicable to the employment of illicit workers and to labour suppliers. The 1989 Loi Evin defined a set of rules that were applicable to all insurers. In 1990, a law was passed that moderately restricted the use of temporary employment services and fixed-term contracts by preventing employers from substituting explicitly unstable for stable work. Initiatives introduced in 1989 and 1990 that consolidated programs to diminish confusion among both recipients and program administrators. The TUC, SIVP, and PIL were folded into one programme (contrats emploi-solidarite, or CES), which acquired legal standing with a fixed-term contract. Participants in this programme received the minimum hourly wage, although they still only worked half-time. By 1991, over 400,000 people were served annually by the programme. The CRA was combined with contrats retour a l'emploi (CRE), another insertion programme, for the long-term unemployed. The CRE was changed by the Rocard Government into a training and employment creation mechanism, and had 100,000 participants by 1990. Funding was also increased for a holdover program from the previous Chirac Government (the allocation de formation-reclassement) that encouraged recipients of unemployment insurance to receive training.

A 1990 law concerning the protection of individuals against discrimination on grounds of their state of health or their disability amended the Penal Code, which already covered discrimination based on race or origin, nationality, ethnicity, marital status, customs, and sex.

The “loi Soisson” of 1989 codified the procedures and requirements for so-called “plans sociaux” for firms laying off more than ten employees, “requiring efforts on the part of firms to avoid layoffs and compensation for workers who did lose their jobs.” The budget of 1990 provided supplementary budgetary allocations to support the long-term unemployed, the creation of several thousand new civil-service posts, a reduction of taxes on rents, and a surtax on high incomes. An Act of June 1990 prohibited “the dismissal (and any other disciplinary measures) of a trade union officer on the grounds of his/her trade union activities,” and in November 1990 a law was passed that extended profit-sharing to firms with between 50 and 100 employees, while that same year the maximum bonus under Interessement des salarie's (CPS) was raised to 20% of gross wages.

The Rocard Government also raised the minimum wage while spending a lot of money on the wages of public sector employees, particularly tax collectors, postal workers, transport workers, and nurses, as economic growth had enabled Rocard to increase public sector pay.

=== Health and welfare ===
From July 1988 onwards, certain workers aged over 60 became able to combine a partial retirement pension with earnings from part-time employment. The Protection and Promotion of Family and Child Health Act, passed in 1989, set further requirements for organising children’s health services, especially in preschools and homes. The legislation also required that the social security office reimburse providers for mandatory examinations, special care at home, and care rendered in hospital clinics and other health facilities. Parents were responsible for selecting providers and also had a financial incentive to follow the recommended schedule of preventive care visits for their children. In July 1990, the age limit for the payment of family benefits was raised from 17 to 18 years, and in January 1990 an Act was passed that extended to elderly persons living with their relatives “an exoneration for employers social security contributions for using a home help.” In 1990, universal access to day-care services was made a subjective right for every child under the age of three. That same year, the age limit for personalized housing aid and family allowances was raised for certain cases.

Additional day-care services and related services for working mothers and families were introduced, and a new allowance for skilled baby-sitters (L'aide a la famille pour l'emploi d'une AFEAMA) was created in 1990 to promote the employment of skilled baby-minders, recognised by public authorities, through a reduction of insurance contributions and through tax incentives. A year earlier, in 1989, childminding expenses were made tax-deductible. From 1989 onwards, the government supported “family child care networks,” places where child care workers and parents can meet, acquire information about issues related to child care, and where assistante maternelles can sometimes benefit from some training. In order to facilitate the reintegration of the long-term unemployed, a law passed in January 1989 abolished the ceiling on employers' contributions for family allowances and extended the employers' exemption from social security contributions when recruiting the long-term unemployed. In 1990, the Rocard Government expanded access to unemployment insurance benefits by reducing the qualifying period for contact workers from 2 years to 6 months, and provided for an extension of benefits through further short-term employment. A new social assistance benefit called the Revenu minimum d'insertion (RMI) was also introduced.

=== Housing ===
Housing was a major priority of the Rocard Government, as characterised by increases in aid for many housing programmes and the maintenance of the real value of benefits under the housing allowance programme (APL), the first time since the early Eighties that its real value had not been reduced by inflation. A new rent law provided the government with the power to issue decrees prohibiting excessive rent increases, while more funds were allocated to social housing. Housing aid was increased by over 8% over 1989, with personalized aid extended to those who had been previously excluded from the housing allowance. More land was also made available in city centres for social housing construction by releasing government land for building. Rocard’s government also decided to paint housing blocks with “crime-ridden architecture” (as Rocard described them) in bright colours as a means of cheering up their residents, but according to one writer, “only the outside walls got the treatment and the insides remained as drab as ever.”

Basic housing allowances were increased and efforts were made to improve social housing for low-income groups via the Besson Act of 1990, which strengthened the rights of families to find and stay in adequate housing. It was passed in response to the growing problem of homelessness and inadequate housing, and stipulated that "guaranteeing the right to housing is a duty of solidarity for the whole society." The act required local authorities to develop schemes for those in need of housing, as well as to create special funds for assisting the poor in paying for rental deposits or moving expenses. The Besson Act also extended means-tested housing allowances, including to young people living in hostels (foyers). The social housing allowance was extended to recipients of RMI in January 1989, and to recipients of the insertion allowance in October 1990.

In February 1990, a new low-interest loan was introduced called the PLA d’insertion, “available to HLMs and other organizations to purchase private sector property for letting to poorer households,” and from 1990 onwards additional loans from the Caisse des Depots et Consignations (CDC) were awarded to social housing bodies to aid access to the social rented sector for certain disadvantaged households, as well as to encourage social and economic integration in some inner city and suburban areas.

In October 1988, the National Council of Cities (CNV) was established by decree, together with an inter-ministerial committee. The decree also set up the Délégation interministérielle à la ville (DIV), an interministerial delegation that was allocated the task of co-ordinating urban policy. The purpose of the DIV's establishment was not only to bring an administrative focus to urban policy programmes within other state institutions and policies, but also to ensure that urban policy was given greater importance. That same year, the government identified 300 prioritized areas for urban development. The Mermaz Act of 1989 introduced new rights for tenants, requiring an individual landlord to offer a new tenant a minimum of a three-year lease, and limiting the power of a landlord to increase the rent of a sitting tenant. The legislation also provided for tenant representation on the HLM Office Boards of Administration.

The 1989 housing budget froze the rate of payback for those having difficulty repaying subsidised loans, and the Rocard Government decided that from 1990 onwards the payback rate would be no more than 2.65% a year (the inflation rate at that time). Members of the Socialist Party group called for the transition features of the Mehaignerie Law (introduced under the previous Chirac Government) to be made permanent. Under these features, most rents would not be free, but would instead “be set by negotiation between landlord and tenant and subject to arbitration by conciliation committees, with rent increases being based on comparable rents in the area.” In partial response to this call, a law was passed in January 1989 which called for “spreading out rent increases exceeding 10 percent over six years and required that all proposals from landlords to increase rents had to include proof that there were comparable rents in the neighbourhood.” A Ministry for Cities was set up in 1990 to work against ‘exclusion’ of all kinds, by developing a strategy to target physical, social, economic and educational issues in an integrated way. That same year, the Grands Projets Urbains (GPU) were launched, largely physical projects targeting 14 particularly deprived urban neighbourhoods which aimed for a thorough restructuring of the estates. In March 1991, the “dotation generale defonctionnement” was reformed to redistribute transfers from richer to poorer localities.

Modifications were also made to some of the harsher legislation introduced by the previous Chirac Government on immigration and the rights of landlords and employers to get rid of unwanted tenants and workers. In addition, government aid to small businesses was increased, while VAT was reduced in an attempt to enliven the market. Retired home-owners and widows, who were reluctant to sell family homes, benefited from legislation passed by the National Assembly in May 1990 which converted the local departmental tax from a property-based tax to one based on income. A law passed in July 1989 dealt with the care of elderly handicapped persons in the homes of private persons, with the aim of guaranteeing a maximum degree of care at an acceptable cost and under supervision by the competent authorities.

=== Education ===
In terms of education, expenditure on the national education system rose considerably, from 198 billion francs in 1988 to 250 billion francs in 1991. In addition, the Baccalauréat was democratised, which was once the preserve of the elite. In 1980, for instance, only 29% of the eligible age group passed it, but in 1995 61% attained it. This improvement was achieved by a law passed in June 1989 that redesigned the curriculum and provided extra support for schools in poor areas. The 1989 Education Act laid down the principle of schooling for all until the end of the second cycle, and the target of 80% of the age cohort reaching baccalauréat level, which reflected the ambition to raise the education level of French people as a whole, and the numbers in secondary-education lycées rapidly increased. While in 1985 less than 30% of an age cohort left school with the baccalauréat, by 1995 that proportion had risen to over 62% by 1995. The 1989 Act also highlighted the will to divide schooling into educational stages (cycles pédagogiques), with the aim of improving educational continuity and help adapt teaching to each child’s individual physiological and psychological capabilities. Under Article 2 of the 1989 Education Act, a place was to be made available for any three-year-old child whose family requests a place in a nursery school as near as possible to his/her home. It also stated that priority should be given to providing school places for two-year-olds living in socially underprivileged areas such as inner-city, rural or mountainous districts. Handicapped children and foreign children were offered places, where conditions allow, in order to facilitate their integration as quickly as possible.

The 1989 Education Act also advised expanding in-company internships and reaffirmed the goal of all pupils of a given age group reaching at least the level of CAP (“Certificat d’Aptitude Professionel”) or BEP (Brevet d’Etudes Professionnel”) within the next ten years. In 1989, an outline agreement for upgrading the status of teachers was signed by the Minister of Education and trade union organisations, which included the improvement of working conditions and remuneration of teachers at the beginning and end of their careers. In 1990, a Memorandum of Agreement, known as the "Protocole Durafour", which concerned the whole public service, enabled teachers in secondary education to improve their internal promotion prospects, and also introduced a special compensation benefit for teachers appointed to work in Educational Priority Zones.

In June 1988, emergency measures amounting to FF 1.2 billion were decided upon for improvements at the start of the 1988-89 school year, in particular as regards school building activities, teachers' working conditions and the vocational integration of young people. An aid to innovation fund was created to permit primary and secondary educational establishments to finance new educational projects. At the end of 1988, an operation to equip schools with data-processing, office-automation and technological systems, was introduced. In 1990, the Back to School Allowance (which was previously available to children from the ages of 6–16 years) was extended to children under the age of 18 who continue their school, university, or are placed in apprenticeship, "subject to possible compensation does not exceed 55% of the minimum wage." In addition, families on a number of other benefits became eligible for the allowance.

To manage the growing number of university entrants, a plan was developed entitled "University 2000," which significantly increased university budgets and resulted in the building of new universities, including four in the suburbs of Paris, for a total capital investment of 23 billion francs between 1990 and 1995. In 1990, University Institutes for the Training of School Teachers were established, setting up university degree courses for primary as well as secondary school teachers. That same year, government networks known Specific Aids for Pupils with Special Needs Networks (Réseaux d’Aides Spécialisées aux élèves en Difficulté) were set up to provide aid to pupils with special needs in ordinary classes with teachers’ help. The Educational Priority Zone (ZEP) programme was expanded, with new zones created in 1989 and 1990, and from 1990 onwards, primary-school teachers were accorded the same status as other school teachers. In 1990, specialised assistance networks (RASED) were established with the objective of preventing schooling difficulties which may be encountered by certain students in ordinary educational establishments.

=== Other measures ===
Expenditure on culture was significantly increased, while a law was passed (the Evin Act) to regulate smoking in public places, together with the anti-discriminatory Gayssot Act. The 1989 budget introduced a number of progressive measures, including an increase in benefits for renters in receipt of APL (aide personalisee de lodgement, or individual housing assistance), an increase in academic scholarships for students, a decrease in interest rates that would assist the services of the HLM, a decrease in the taxe d’habitation (a per-inhabitant tax on living dwellings for individuals on low incomes), and an increase in expenditures for newspapers of weak advertising capacity. In addition, the war veterans ministry received an extra 75 million francs, while the budget for youth and sports received an increase of 6.2 million francs. Taxes were also significantly reduced in the 1989 budget, with corporate taxes reduced by 10 billion francs and taxes on individuals cut by 5 billion francs. To combat political corruption, a law was passed in January 1990 that provided for strict regulation of campaign contributions and personal use of funds for non-governmental organisations. Other measures included increases in minimum social benefits, a major investment in education, the reform of the legal profession, and the modernisation of the public sector.

Public housing for the poor was improved while the aged and handicapped received new benefits, and a new law was passed that allowed for the suspension of all civic rights (including voting or running for office) for anyone convicted of serious racist or anti-Semitic offences. The postal and telephone system was considerably reformed, together with the judicial professions. Key reforms were also adopted in the financing of political parties and campaigns, while other reforms were carried out in the penal code and in regulations that governed the terms of psychiatric internment. The Neiertz Act, also passed in 1990, established “overindebtendess commissions” as a means of tackling cases of household overindebtness.

A cancellation of one-third of the debts owed to France by the poorest countries was announced, while technical and liberalising adjustments were also made to several controversial bills passed by the previous Chirac Government, amongst the notable being changes to measures which made it easier for landlords to impose higher market rents, for the police to expel summarily (without court order) illegal aliens picked up on suspicion, and making it easier for firms to dismiss their workers. To provide infrastructural and “human capital” support to French industries, state investment in transport projects and training and education was increased significantly, while efforts were made to raise educational standards via a substantive reform of the school system. Between 1988 and 1990, the Mitterrand-Rocard administration also played a leading role in pressing for a "social dimension" to the new post-1992 EC open market, championing the enactment of a "social charter" of basic worker and welfare rights. The wealth tax (abolished under the previous government of Jacques Chirac) was restored and the CSG (general social contribution) was introduced in 1990 to provide a more egalitarian way of financing social security.

Preceded by Second Chirac government	Government of France; 1988–1991	Succeeded by Cresson government
