= Édith Cresson =

Prime Minister of France from 1991 to 1992

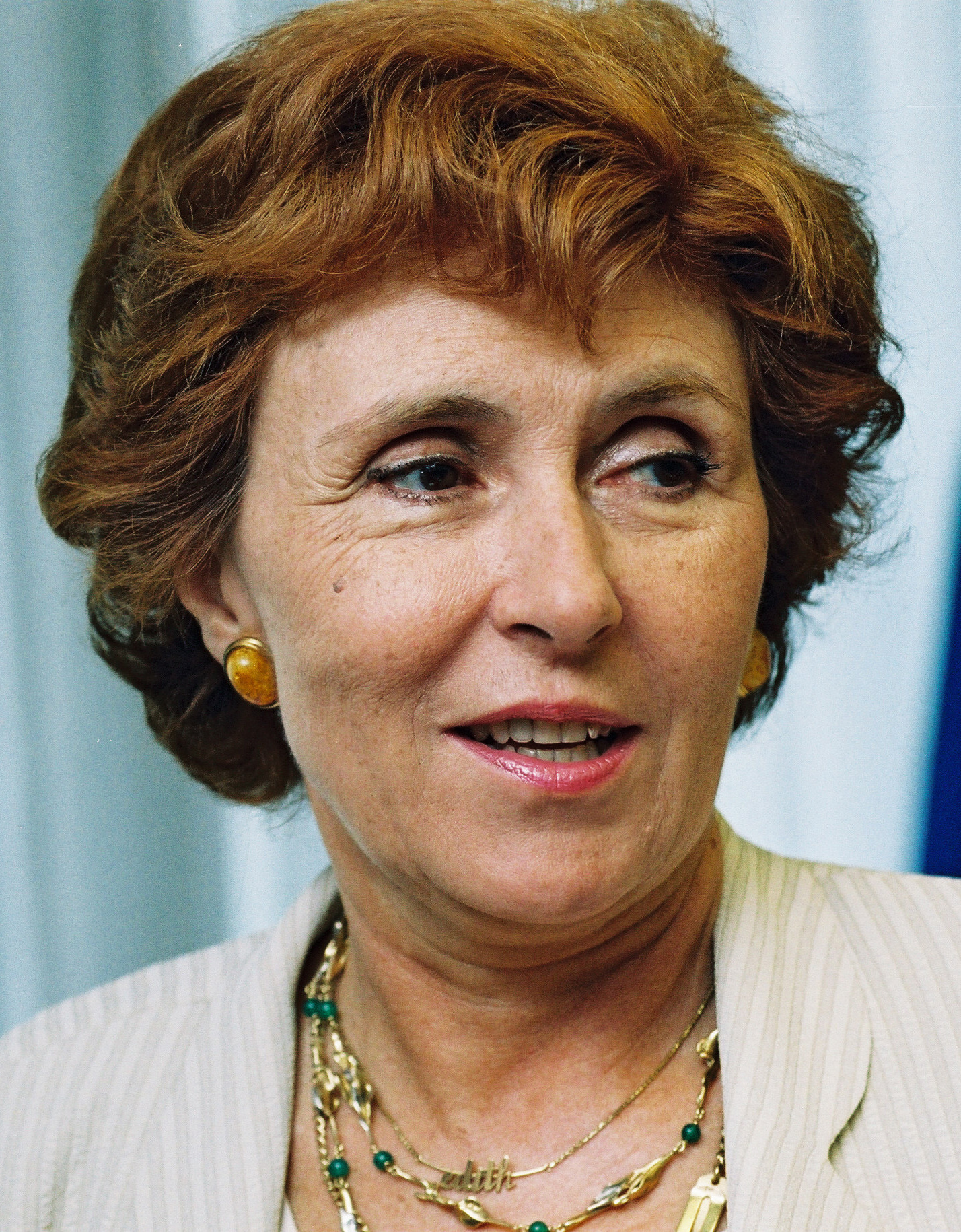
- Cresson in 1995

Prime Minister of France
- In office 15 May 1991 – 2 April 1992
- President: François Mitterrand
- Preceded by: Michel Rocard
- Succeeded by: Pierre Bérégovoy

European Commissioner for Research, Science and Technology
- In office 23 January 1995 – 12 September 1999
- President: Jacques Santer; Manuel Marín (Acting)
- Preceded by: Antonio Ruberti
- Succeeded by: Philippe Busquin

Mayor of Châtellerault
- In office 13 March 1983 – 25 May 1997
- Preceded by: Geneviève Abelin
- Succeeded by: Joël Tondusson

Member of the National Assembly for Vienne
- In office 2 April 1986 – 28 July 1988
- In office 2 July 1981 – 23 July 1981

Member of the European Parliament for France
- In office 17 July 1979 – 16 June 1981

Mayor of Thuré
- In office 20 March 1977 – 13 March 1983
- Preceded by: Louis Tour Girard
- Succeeded by: Claude Marquois

Personal details
- Born: Édith Jeanne Thérèse Campion; 27 January 1934 (age 92) Boulogne-Billancourt, France
- Party: PS (1971–present)
- Other political affiliations: CIR (1965–1971)
- Spouse: Jacques Cresson (m. 1959; died 2001)
- Children: 2
- Relatives: Fortuné Cresson (father-in-law)
- Education: HEC Jeunes Filles
- Occupation: Economist • politician

Édith Jeanne Thérèse Cresson (French: [edit kʁɛsɔ̃]; née Campion; born 27 January 1934) is a French politician of the Socialist Party. She served as Prime Minister of France from 1991 to 1992, the first woman to do so and only woman until Élisabeth Borne's appointment in 2022. Her political career ended in scandal as a result of corruption charges dating from her tenure as European Commissioner for Research, Science and Technology.

== French Prime Minister ==
Cresson was appointed to the prime ministerial post by President François Mitterrand on 15 May 1991. She soon became strongly unpopular among the electorate and had to leave office after less than one year, following the Socialists' poor showing in 1992's regional elections. Her premiership was one of the shortest in the history of the Fifth Republic. Her strong criticism of Japanese trade practices, going so far as to compare the Japanese to "yellow ants trying to take over the world", led to charges of racism. Discussing the sexual activities of Anglo-Saxon males, she said: "Homosexuality seems strange to me. It's different and marginal. It exists more in the Anglo-Saxon tradition than the Latin one."

In social policy, Cresson's government enacted the Urban Framework Act of 1991, which sought to ensure a "right to the city" for all citizens. The Act required "local bodies to provide living and dwelling conditions which will foster social cohesion and enable conditions of segregation to be avoided." The Cresson Government also placed considerable emphasis during its time in office on facilitating the international competitiveness of firms with under 500 employees. A law was passed in July 1991 which included several measures aimed at improving access of people with disabilities to housing, work places, and public buildings. In addition an Act of July 1991 on legal aid "gave the public (above all, foreigners who are lawfully domiciled in France) wider access to the courts." In January 1992, housing allowances were extended to all low-income households in cities with more than 100,000 inhabitants. Under a law of 10 July 1991, access to legal information "was also included as part of the legal aid system." A water law was passed in January 1992 "to ensure the protection of water quality and quantity and aquatic ecosystems," and in February 1992 a law was passed to promote citizens' consultation.

Cresson is a member of the Council of Women World Leaders, an international network of current and former women presidents and prime ministers whose mission is to mobilize the highest-level women leaders globally for collective action on issues of critical importance to women and equitable development.

== European Commissioner ==
While a European Commissioner, Cresson was the main target in the fraud allegations that led to the resignation of the Santer Commission in 1999. Subsequent to a fraud inquiry the European Commission said that Cresson in her capacity as the Research Commissioner "failed to act in response to known, serious and continuing irregularities over several years". Cresson was found guilty of not reporting failures in a youth training programme from which vast sums went missing.

=== Appointing a friend ===
When Cresson took up her functions, she intended to appoint dental surgeon Philippe Berthelot, one of her close acquaintances, as a "personal advisor". Because Berthelot was 66 years old, he could not be appointed as a member of a Commissioner's Cabinet. When Cresson took up office, her Cabinet was already fully staffed with personal advisors. Berthelot was instead engaged as a "visiting scientist" in September 1995.

Berthelot worked only as a personal advisor to Cresson. His contract expired on 1 March 1997, and he was offered another visiting scientist's contract for a period of one year. EU rules specify a maximum duration of 24 months for visiting scientists, but Berthelot spent two and a half years in the position.

On 31 December 1997, Berthelot requested the termination of his contract on medical grounds, and his application was accepted. A complaint was made by a member of parliament, and a criminal investigation concerning Berthelot was opened in Belgium in 1999. In June 2004, the Chambre du conseil of the Tribunal de première instance de Bruxelles (Court of First Instance, Brussels) decided that no further action should be taken in the case.

=== European Commission vs. Édith Cresson ===
On 11 July 2006, in a judgment by the European Court of Justice on Case C-432/04 (Commission of the European Communities versus Édith Cresson), the Court declared that Édith Cresson acted in breach of her obligations as a European Commissioner. While the breach of the obligations arising from the office of Member of the Commission calls, in principle, for the imposition of a penalty, the Court held that, having regard to the circumstances of the case, the finding of breach constituted, of itself, an appropriate penalty and, accordingly, decided not to impose on Cresson a penalty in the form of a deprivation of her right to a pension or other benefits.

Cresson claimed that where the conduct complained of in criminal and disciplinary proceedings was the same, the findings of the criminal court were binding on the disciplinary authorities. However, the Court held that it was not bound by the legal characterisation of facts made in the context of the criminal proceedings and that it was for the Court, exercising its discretion to the full, to investigate whether the conduct complained of in proceedings brought under Article 213(2) EC constituted a breach of the obligations arising from the office of Commissioner. Accordingly, the decision of the Chambre du conseil of the Tribunal de première instance de Bruxelles that there was no evidence of criminal conduct on Cresson's part could not bind the Court.

== Political career ==
European Commissioner for Research, Innovation and Science, 1995–1999.

Governmental functions

Minister of Agriculture, 1981–1983.

Minister of Foreign trade and Tourism, 1983–1984.

Minister of Industrial Redeployment and Foreign Trade, 1984–1986.

Minister of European Affairs, 1988–1990 (Resignation).

Prime minister, 1991–1992 (Resignation).

Electoral mandates

European Parliament

Member of European Parliament, 1979–1981 (Elected in parliamentary elections, and became minister in 1981). Elected in 1979.

National Assembly of France

Member of the National Assembly of France for Vienne (4th constituency), Elected in 1981, but she became minister in June / 1986–1988. Elected in 1981, reelected in 1986, 1988.

General Council

General councillor of Vienne, 1982–1998 (Resignation). Reelected in 1988, 1994.

Municipal Council

Municipal councillor of Thuré, 1977–1983.

Mayor of Thuré, 1977–1983.

Municipal councillor of Châtellerault, 1983–2008. Reelected in 1989, 1995, 2001.

Mayor of Châtellerault, 1983–1997 (Resignation). Reelected in 1989, 1995.

Deputy-mayor of Châtellerault, 1997–2008. Reelected in 2001.

== Cresson's Cabinet, 15 May 1991 – 2 April 1992 ==
Édith Cresson – Prime Minister

- Roland Dumas – Minister of Foreign Affairs
- Pierre Joxe – Minister of Defense
- Philippe Marchand – Minister of the Interior
- Pierre Bérégovoy – Minister of Economy, Finance, Budget, and Privatization
- Roger Fauroux – Minister of Industry
- Martine Aubry – Minister of Labour, Employment, and Vocational Training
- Henri Nallet – Minister of Justice
- Lionel Jospin – Minister of National Education
- Jack Lang – Minister of Culture and Communication
- Louis Mermaz – Minister of Agriculture and Forests
- Brice Lalonde – Minister of Environment
- Frédérique Bredin – Minister of Youth and Sports
- Louis Le Pensec – Minister of Overseas Departments and Territories
- Paul Quilès – Minister of Transport, Housing, Space, and Equipment
- Jean Poperen – Minister of Relations with Parliament
- Edwige Avice – Minister of Cooperation and Development
- Jean-Pierre Soisson – Minister of Civil Service and Administrative Modernization
- Michel Delebarre – Minister of City and Regional Planning
- Hubert Curien – Minister of Research and Technology
- Jean-Louis Bianco – Minister of Social Affairs and Integration

== Personal life ==
Cresson was married to Jacques Cresson between 1959 until his death in 2001, and has two daughters.

== Selected publications ==
- 1976: Avec le soleil, Paris: Éditions Jean-Claude Lattès
- 1989: L'Europe à votre porte: manuel pratique sur les actions de la CEE intéressant les opérateurs économiques, Centre français du commerce extérieur (with Henri Malosse)
- 1998: Innover ou subir. Paris: éditions Flammarion ISBN 2-08-035504-X
- 2006: Histoires françaises. Monaco: Éditions du Rocher ISBN 2-268-06015-2 (autobiography)

Political offices
Preceded by Pierre Méhaignerie	Minister of Agriculture; 1981–1983	Succeeded by Michel Rocard
Preceded by Michel Jobert	Minister of External Commerce; 1983–1986	Succeeded by Roger Fauroux
Preceded by Olivier Guichard	Minister of Tourism; 1983–1984	Succeeded by Michel Crépeau
Preceded by Laurent Fabius	Minister of Industrial Redeployment; 1984–1986	Succeeded by Alain Madelin
Preceded by Michel Rocard	Prime Minister of France; 1991–1992	Succeeded by Pierre Bérégovoy
Preceded by Jacques Delors	French European Commissioner; 1995–1999; Served alongside: Yves-Thibault de Silguy	Succeeded by Pascal Lamy
Preceded by Christiane Scrivener	French European Commissioner; 1995–1999; Served alongside: Yves-Thibault de Silguy	Succeeded by Michel Barnier
Preceded by Antonio Ruberti	European Commissioner for Research, Science and Technology; 1995–1999	Succeeded by Philippe Busquin
Order of precedence
Preceded by Laurent Fabius as former Prime Minister	Order of precedence of France; Former Prime Minister	Succeeded by Alain Juppé as former Prime Minister
