= André Petit =

André Petit may refer to:

- André Petit (general) (1909–1999), French general and participant in the 1961 Algiers putsch
- André Petit (politician) (1921–2021), French politician
