= Head of the Prime Minister's military cabinet =

- Chef du cabinet militaire du Premier ministre
- Incumbent; Brigadier general Benoît Durieux since 22 July 2017
- Military Cabinet
- Member of: Cabinet of France
- Reports to: Prime Minister
- Seat: Hôtel Matignon, Paris

The Head of the Prime Minister's military cabinet (Chef du cabinet militaire du Premier ministre) is a role in the military and government of France, heading the prime minister's military cabinet.

== List of officeholders ==
No.	Portrait	Name (Born-Died)	Term			Government	Ref
No.	Portrait	Name (Born-Died)	Took office	Left office	Duration	Government	Ref
1	André Petit	Général de brigade André Petit	14 February 1959	23 January 1960	343 days	Debré	–
9	Robert Gastaldi	Général de brigade Robert Gastaldi	13 September 1984	25 August 1986	1 year, 346 days	Fabius	–
10	Bernard Norlain [fr]	Général de brigade aérienne Bernard Norlain (born 1939)	27 August 1986	16 December 1989	3 years, 111 days	Chirac II; Rocard I–II	–
11	Jean-Marie Menu	Général de brigade aérienne Jean-Marie Menu	16 December 1989	31 August 1991	1 year, 258 days	Rocard II	–
12	Patrick Lecointre	Contre-amiral; Patrick Lecointre	31 August 1991	15 May 1994	2 years, 257 days	Cresson; Bérégovoy; Balladur	–
13	Alain Courthieu	Général de division aérienne Alain Courthieu	16 May 1994	17 September 1995	1 year, 124 days	Balladur	–
14	Jean-Pierre Kelche	Général de division Jean-Pierre Kelche (born 1942)	18 September 1995	27 August 1996	344 days	Juppé I–II	–
15	Louis Le Miere	Général de brigade Louis Le Miere	28 August 1996	31 July 1998	1 year, 337 days	Juppé II; Jospin	–
16	Alain Dumontet	Contre-amiral; Alain Dumontet	1 August 1998	30 September 2002	4 years, 61 days	Jospin; Raffarin I	–
17	Stéphane Abrial	Général de brigade aérienne Stéphane Abrial (born 1954)	1 October 2002	31 August 2005	2 years, 335 days	Raffarin II–III	–
18	Jean-Marc Denuel	Général de brigade aérienne Jean-Marc Denuel (born 1954)	1 September 2005	14 September 2008	2 years, 348 days	Villepin; Fillon I–II	–
19	Pierre de Villiers	Général de division Pierre de Villiers (born 1956)	29 August 2008	11 March 2010	1 year, 194 days	Fillon II	–
20	Bernard de Courrèges [fr]	Général de division Bernard de Courrèges (born 1960)	11 March 2010	14 August 2014	4 years, 156 days	Fillon II–III; Ayrault I–II; Valls I	–
21	Olivier Taprest	Général de brigade aérienne Olivier Taprest	14 August 2014	1 September 2016	2 years, 18 days	Valls II	–
22	François Lecointre	Général de corps d'armée François Lecointre (born 1962)	1 September 2016	22 July 2017	324 days	Valls II; Cazeneuve; Philippe I–II	–
23	Benoît Durieux	Général de brigade Benoît Durieux	22 July 2017	Incumbent	4 years, 9 days	Philippe II	–
24	Franck Barrera	Général de division Franck Barrera	31 July 2021	Incumbent	5 years, 38 days	Castex	
