= Idelphonse Favé =

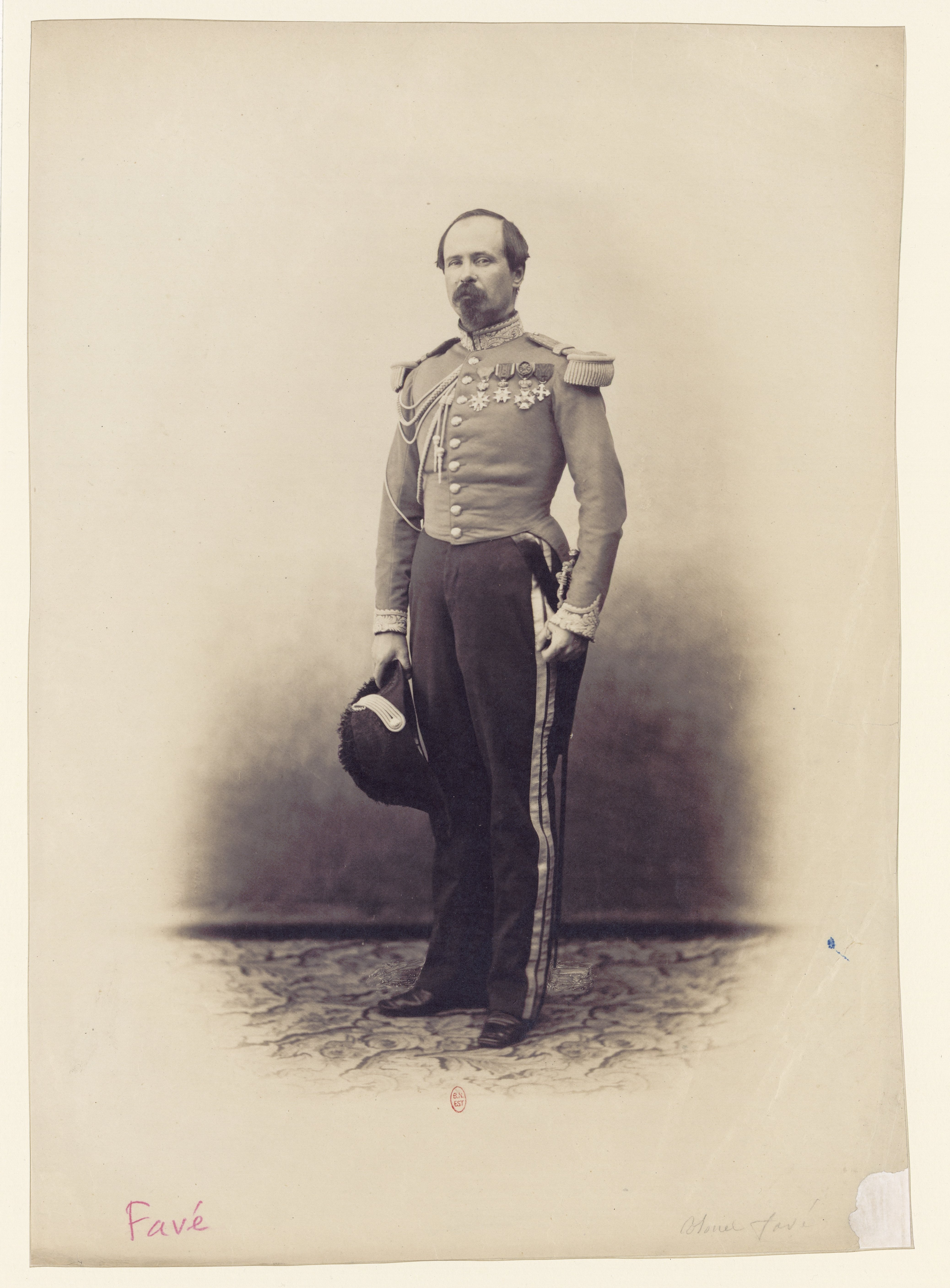
- Idelphonse Favé in 1857.

Idelphonse Favé, born on February 28, 1812 in Dreux (Eure-et-Loir) and died on March 14, 1894 (aged 81–82) in the 7th arrondissement of Paris, was a French brigadier general, military writer, and member of the French Academy of Sciences.

== Biography ==
He entered the École Polytechnique in 1830, attended the Artillery School of Metz, and became a lieutenant in the artillery.

In 1841, he published Nouveau système de défense des places fortes [New System of Fortress Defense], and was assigned to the weapons factory in Tulle.

In 1845, he was appointed assistant to the director of precision workshops at the central artillery depot; by then he had published Histoire tactique des trois armes [Tactical History of the Three Arms].

He wrote the volumes 3 to 6 of Études sur le passé et l'avenir de l'artillerie [Studies on the Past and Future of Artillery]. Volumes 1 to 2 were written by Napoléon III during his imprisonment at the Fort of Ham; in 1847, he studied a new carbine model.

Louis-Napoléon, who became President of the Republic in 1848, called upon Favé who then published his Nouveau système d'artillerie [New Artillery System] in 1850. He was then sent on a study mission to England, Holland, and Belgium to evaluate their artillery equipment (explosives manufacturing and organization of weapons factories).

Upon his return, appointed as professor of fortification at the École Polytechnique, he became Louis-Napoléon's orderly officer [l'officier d'ordonnance] in 1852 and later his chef d'escadron.

In 1853, during the Crimean War, he developed steam-powered armored floating batteries for the attack on the port of Kronstadt, three of which were used at Sevastopol in 1855.

As military cabinet chief to Napoleon III during the Italian campaign, he later worked on rifled cannon artillery and created some of the first machine guns.

As colonel in 1859 and brigadier general on August 13, 1865, Favé was appointed commandant of the École Polytechnique in 1866. He participated in the defense of Paris in 1870.

He transferred to the reserve on February 28, 1874 and was simultaneously promoted to Grand Officer of the Legion of Honor. He taught military art at Polytechnique from 1874 to 1882.

On July 10, 1876, he was elected to the French Academy of Sciences, replacing Baron Séguier.

== Publications ==
In addition to the works cited above, he published, among others:

- L'armée française depuis la guerre, 1874-1875
- Cours d'art militaire

== See also ==
- Franklin Society
