= Albin Chalandon =

French politician and minister (1920–2020)

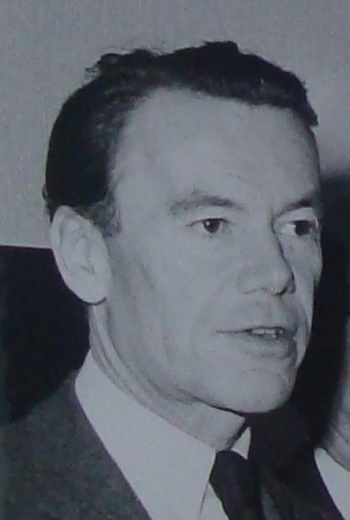

Minister of Justice
- In office 20 March 1986 – 10 May 1988
- Prime Minister: Jacques Chirac
- Preceded by: Michel Crépeau
- Succeeded by: Pierre Arpaillange

Minister of Public Works
- In office 11 July 1968 – 5 July 1972
- Prime Minister: Maurice Couve de Murville; Jacques Chaban-Delmas
- Preceded by: Robert Galley
- Succeeded by: Olivier Guichard

Minister of Industry
- In office 31 May 1968 – 10 July 1968
- Prime Minister: Georges Pompidou
- Preceded by: Olivier Guichard
- Succeeded by: André Bettencourt

Personal details
- Born: 11 June 1920 Reyrieux, France
- Died: 29 July 2020 (aged 100) Les Mesnuls, Yvelines, France
- Party: RPR
- Spouses: Salomé Murat (m. 1951; died 2016) Catherine Nay (m. 2016)
- Children: 3
- Education: Lycée Condorcet
- Alma mater: Faculté des lettres de Paris

Albin Chalandon (French pronunciation: [albɛ̃ ʃalɑ̃dɔ̃]; 11 June 1920 – 29 July 2020) was a French politician and minister.

Between 1968 and 1972, he was Minister of Public Works. He gave his name to the inexpensive single-family homes known as "chalandonnettes", of which around 65,000 were built between 1970 and 1972 and which became a byword for poor construction quality. And from 1986 until 1988, he was Minister of Justice.

Between 1967 and 1968, he was a member of the Union for the New Republic, then between 1968 and 1976 he was a member of the Union of Democrats for the Republic and finally from 1986 until 1988 he was a member of the Rally for the Republic.

Chalandon died aged 100 in July 2020. Éric Dupond-Moretti described his death as depriving France of one of its "Liberation fighters" and "the Republic one of its great servants".

== Honours and awards ==
- Grand-Croix of the Order of the Legion of Honour
- Croix de Guerre 1939-1945
- Officier of the Ordre National du Mérite

Political offices
Preceded by Olivier Guichard	Minister of Industry; 1968	Succeeded by André Bettencourt
Preceded by Robert Galley	Minister of Public Works; 1968–1972	Succeeded by Olivier Guichard
Preceded by Michel Crépeau	Minister of Justice; 1986–1988	Succeeded by Pierre Arpaillange
