= Wilhelm von Hahnke =

Field Marshal of Prussia (1833–1912)

Wilhelm Gustav Karl Bernhard von Hahnke
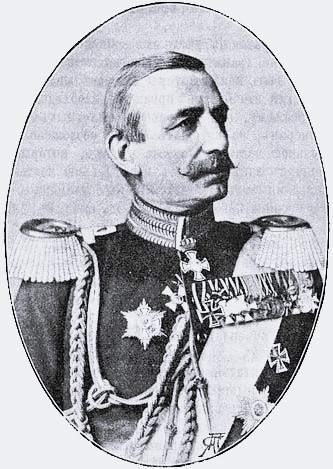
- Born: 1 October 1833; Berlin
- Died: 8 February 1912 (aged 78)
- Military career
- Allegiance: Prussia; German Empire
- Branch: Prussian Army; Imperial German Army
- Rank: Generalfeldmarschall
- Commands: Chief of Staff, III Corps; 1st Guards Infantry Brigade; 1st Guards Infantry Division; Chief of the Military Cabinet; Adjutant-General to the Emperor
- Conflicts: Second Schleswig War; Austro-Prussian War; Franco-Prussian War
- Awards: Order of the Black Eagle; Order of the Red Eagle (Grand Cross)

Wilhelm Gustav Karl Bernhard von Hahnke (1 October 1833 in Berlin – 8 February 1912) was a Prussian Field Marshal, and Chief of the German Imperial Military Cabinet from 1888 to 1901.

== Biography ==
Born into an old Prussian family of officers, he was the son of Wilhelm Hahnke (1793-1861) and his wife Angelique, née von der Lancken (1803-1873). His father was raised to the hereditary Prussian nobility in 1836, thus becoming Wilhelm von Hahnke. After time in the cadet corps Hahnke joined the military as second lieutenant in the 1st Guards Grenadiers in 1851. During the Second Schleswig War, Hahnke served as a company leader. During the Austro-Prussian War he served on the staff of Prince Friedrich Karl of Prussia as a general staff officer. During the Franco-Prussian War he served on the latter's staff again and earned the Iron Cross (first class).

In 1888 Hahnke was appointed Chief of the Military Cabinet of the just-crowned Wilhelm II. In January 1905 he was promoted to field marshal. He later was appointed as the Adjutant-General to the Kaiser. He died on 8 February 1912.

== Family ==
Hahnke married 1865 in Berlin Josephine von Bülow (1842–1911), daughter of Friedrich von Bülow (1789–1853). The couple had seven sons and two daughters, among them:

- Wilhelm (1867–1931), Prussian Major general ∞ Elisabeth von Schlieffen (born 1869), daughter of Field Marshal Alfred von Schlieffen.
- Adolf (3 July 1873 – 6 July 1936), jurist.

== Honours and awards ==
German honours

- Prussia:
  - Knight of the Red Eagle, 4th Class with Swords, 1864; 3rd Class with Bow, 1866; 2nd Class with Oak Leaves and Swords on Ring, 18 January 1884; Grand Cross with Crown, 27 January 1893
  - Knight of the Royal Crown Order, 3rd Class with Swords, 1864; 2nd Class with Swords on Ring, 20 September 1876; 1st Class
  - Iron Cross (1870), 1st Class with 2nd Class on Black Band
  - Grand Commander's Cross of the Royal House Order of Hohenzollern
  - Knight of the Black Eagle, 18 October 1895; with Diamonds, 26 April 1901
- Anhalt: Grand Cross of the Order of Albert the Bear, 1889
- Baden:
  - Knight of the Military Karl-Friedrich Merit Order, 1870
  - Knight of the Order of Berthold the First, 1893
  - Knight of the House Order of Fidelity, 1899
- Bavaria:
  - Grand Cross of Merit of the Bavarian Crown, 1897
  - Grand Cross of the Military Merit Order
- Brunswick: Grand Cross of the Order of Henry the Lion, 1889
- (Saxe-Coburg and Gotha) (Duchy of Saxe-Altenburg) (Saxe-Meiningen) Ernestine duchies: Grand Cross of the Saxe-Ernestine House Order
- Hesse and by Rhine:
  - Grand Cross of the Merit Order of Philip the Magnanimous, with Swords, 8 December 1889
  - Grand Cross of the Ludwig Order, 6 May 1892
- Württemberg:
  - Commander of the Friedrich Order, 2nd Class with Swords, 1870; Grand Cross, 1888
  - Grand Cross of the Württemberg Crown, in Diamonds, 1891

Foreign honours

- (Austrian Empire) (Kingdom of Hungary) Austria-Hungary:
  - Knight of the Iron Crown, 1st Class, 1888
  - Grand Cross of the Imperial Order of Leopold, 1891; in Diamonds, 1895
  - Grand Cross of the Royal Hungarian Order of St. Stephen, 1897
- Belgium: Grand Cordon of the Order of Leopold
- Principality of Bulgaria:
  - Grand Cross of St. Alexander
  - Grand Cross of the Military Merit Order
- Denmark: Grand Cross of the Dannebrog, 26 June 1888
- French Empire: Officer of the Legion of Honour
- Kingdom of Greece: Grand Cross of the Redeemer
- Kingdom of Italy:
  - Grand Cross of Saints Maurice and Lazarus
  - Grand Cross of the Crown of Italy
- Empire of Japan: Grand Cordon of the Rising Sun
- Monaco: Grand Cross of St. Charles, 14 April 1907
- Principality of Montenegro: Grand Cross of the Order of Prince Danilo I
- Netherlands: Grand Cross of the Netherlands Lion
- Ottoman Empire:
  - Order of Glory
  - Order of Osmanieh, 1st Class in Diamonds
  - Order of the Medjidie, 1st Class in Diamonds
- Persian Empire: Order of the Lion and the Sun, 1st Class
- Kingdom of Portugal: Grand Cross of the Royal Military Order of St. Benedict of Aviz
- Qing dynasty: Order of the Double Dragon, Class I Grade III
- Kingdom of Romania:
  - Grand Cross of the Star of Romania
  - Grand Cross of the Crown of Romania
- Russian Empire:
  - Knight of St. Andrew
  - Knight of St. Vladimir, 4th Class
- Kingdom of Serbia: Grand Cross of the Cross of Takovo
- Siam: Grand Cross of the White Elephant
- Sweden-Norway:
  - Commander Grand Cross of the Sword, 1884
  - Grand Cross of St. Olav, 19 July 1888
- United Kingdom: Honorary Grand Cross of the Royal Victorian Order, 15 June 1907
