= Noëlle Lenoir =

French politician (born 1948)

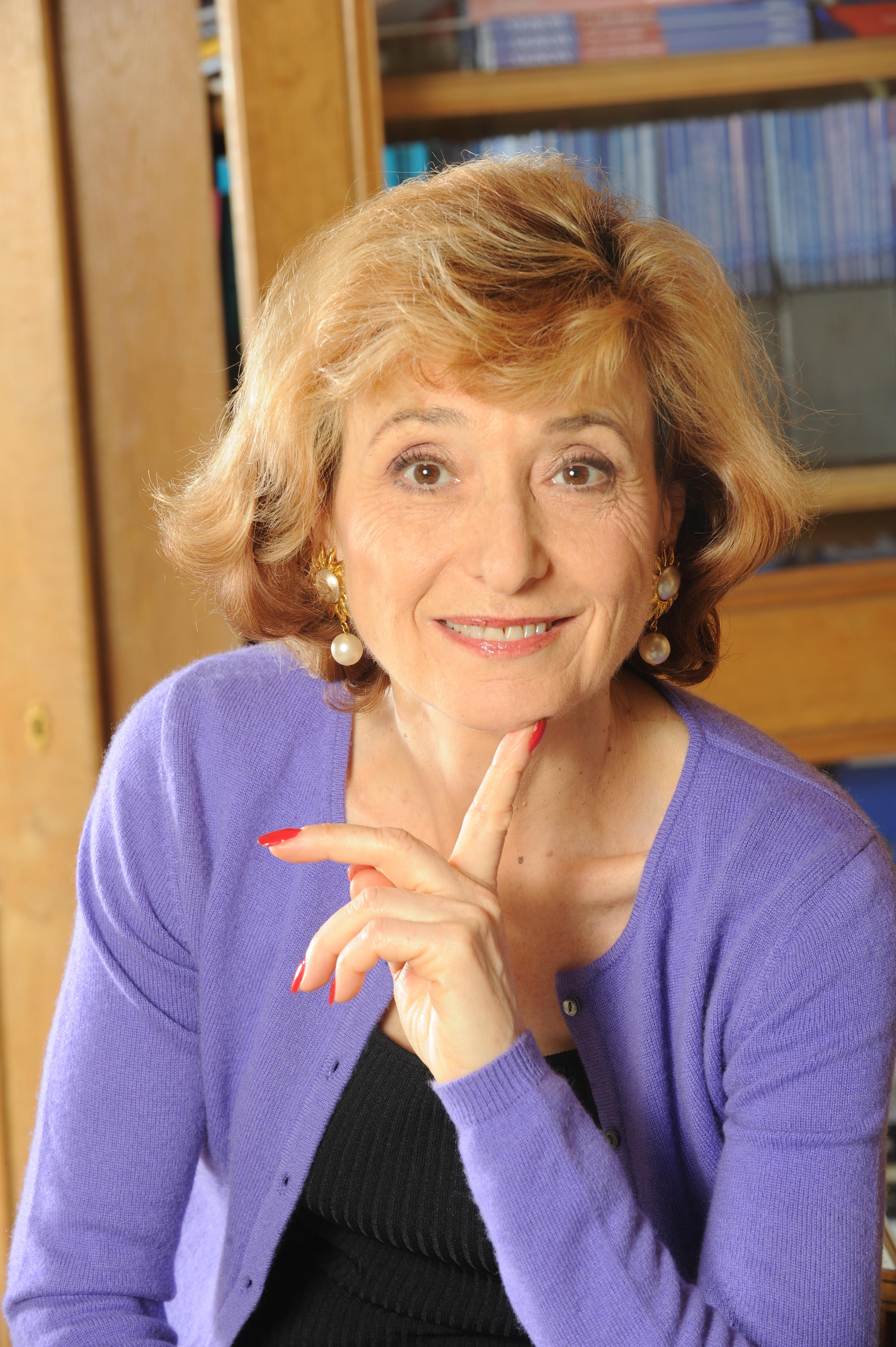
- Lenoir in 2015

Minister for European Affairs
- In office 17 June 2002 – 30 March 2004
- Prime Minister: Jean-Pierre Raffarin
- Preceded by: Claudie Haigneré
- Succeeded by: Renaud Donnedieu de Vabres

Member of the Constitutional Council
- In office 11 March 1992 – 11 March 2001
- Appointed by: Henri Emmanuelli
- President: Robert Badinter; Roland Dumas; Yves Guéna
- Preceded by: Francis Mollet-Vieville
- Succeeded by: Pierre Joxe

Mayor of Valmondois
- In office 15 March 2008 – 30 April 2010
- Preceded by: Bruno Huisman
- Succeeded by: Bruno Huisman
- In office 24 March 1989 – 23 June 1995
- Preceded by: Charles Mathieu
- Succeeded by: Bruno Huisman

Personal details
- Born: Françoise Noëlle Monique Fréaud; 27 April 1948 (age 78) Neuilly-sur-Seine, France
- Party: Socialist Party (1990s); Miscellaneous right (2000s)
- Education: Sciences Po; Paris Law Faculty
- Profession: Jurist, civil servant, politician

Françoise Noëlle Monique Lenoir (French pronunciation: [nɔɛl lənwaʁ]; née Fréaud, 27 April 1948) is a French retired politician who served as Minister for European Affairs from 2002 to 2004 under Foreign Minister Dominique de Villepin. She previously was a member of the Constitutional Council from 1992 to 2001.

== Early life and education ==
Lenoir was born in Neuilly-sur-Seine. She is a graduate of Sciences Po and the Paris Law Faculty.

== Career ==
After qualifying as a lawyer and the achievement of the Senate administrator competition, Lenoir was appointed, from 1972 to 1982, at the law Committee of the French Senate. During her time at the Senate, she was in charge of not only the Justice budget, but also the follow-up and review of criminal law, immigration law, and human rights law. Following 10 years at the High Assembly, Noelle Lenoir joined the regulation management of the newly formed national data protection authority Commission for Information Technology and Civil Liberties (Commission Nationale de l'Informatique et des Libertés (CNIL) as Chief Legal Officer, from 1982 until 1984. She followed the implementation of the French Data Processing and Liberty Law and she particularly focused on marketing, health data and the applicability of the law in the Scientific and Statistics domains as well as transborder on transfers of data in addition to enquiries by the CNIL.

She became a local representative of the City of Valmandois (Val d'Oise) for the first time in 1977. By 1989 she was elected mayor of Valmondois until 1995, a post she had to abandon in favor of her mandate as a justice of the French Constitutional Court.

In 1984, she joined the Council of State (the Conseil d'État is the French administrative Supreme Court) where she was appointed 'Rapporteur Public" (Advocate general). In 1988, she was appointed as Chief of Staff for the Ministry of Justice, where she served until 1990. In 1990, the French government appointed Lenoir to review French bioethics law. Her report to the Prime Minister, Michel Rocard, titled "Aux Frontières de la Vie: Pour une éthique biomedicale à la Française" provided the foundation and adoption of the first French bioethics law.

=== Member of the Constitutional Council ===
She was appointed as the first woman and youngest person to the French Constitutional Council, where she served the Court's nine-year term from 1992 to 2001.

Aside from being a constitutional Justice, Noelle Lenoir chaired the UNESCO International Bioethics Committee and drafted the Human Genome and Human Rights Declaration, which the United Nations endorsed in 1998 on the 50th anniversary of the Universal Declaration of Human Rights. In 1991, she is also appointed by the European Commission presided by Jacques Delors as a member of the European Ethics and Science & Technology Group (GEE). Then, in 1994, she is elected as President of this group and reelected by its members twice.

She left her position at the GEE in 2000 to travel to the United States where she was, an adjunct law professor at the Law university of Columbia, New York City before joining the Paris Bar in 2001.

=== Junior Minister for European Affairs ===
Lenoir was appointed in 2002 Junior Minister for European Affairs by Prime Minister Jean-Pierre Raffarin. During her tenure she was involved in a number of negotiations with central and oriental European countries on their way to join the European Union and the follow-up of the constitutional treaty. In addition, she defended France's positions on various European proposals and legislation. Finally, she is the first woman appointed, with her counterpart the German minister of European affairs, to the position of General Secretary for France-German Cooperation (SGFA).

=== Legal practice ===
Noëlle Lenoir joined Debevoise & Plimpton LLP's the Paris office as Of-Counsel in 2004. In 2006–2007 she was appointed by the French Minister of Justice to conduct an evaluation of the status of the European Company (SE) (report delivered on 19 March 2007).

=== Mayor of Valmondois ===
Lenoir ran again for the mayor in 2008 and was reelected with her complete list. Lenoir stayed Mayor of Valmondois from 2008 through 2010, where she resigned for personal reasons. In this capacity she was vice-president of the Community of Cities of the District of "Sausseron", member of the Steering Committee of the Association of France Mayors, as well as member of the Legal Committee of "Concessions – Délégations de service public" of the Delegate Management Institute.

=== Return to legal practice ===
Lenoir joined JeantetAssociés in 2009 as a partner where she headed the European department (competition law, litigation and regulatory).

In January 2012, Lenoir joined the Paris office of Kramer Levin Naftalis & Frankel LLP as a partner where she currently heads the Compliance department, dealing with regulatory and public affairs law at the national level and European level. She also specializes in competition law, and data protection and cyber security law, covering a wide scope of areas in this respect such as data breach prevention and incident response, government and internal investigations, cross-border data transfer and e-discovery, controllers' and processors' liability, global compliance and risk management, privacy policies and EU data counseling, consumer protection and class action litigation defense as well as advertising and internet marketing. She also advises on confidential business information and misappropriation of trade secrets as well as on matters in relation with the blocking statute. Between 22 May 2017 and 30 April 2020, she was a member of the panel of independent experts or ICRP (along with Theo Waigel, former Finance Minister of Germany, and Lord Gold) designated by Airbus to examine the compliance within the company and monitor the improvements needed.

After having been appointed by the French Minister of Justice, she acted as Commissioner under the 1970 Hague Convention on the taking of evidence abroad in civil and commercial matters in charge of ensuring compliance of the discovery process set up in relation with the tragic fire at the Grenfell Apartment complex in London with the French Blocking Statute and GDPR.

In July 2020, Lenoir created her own law firm – Noëlle Lenoir Avocats – and was referenced by Décideurs among the 30 best lawyers.

== Current educational activities / think tank ==
Noëlle Lenoir taught at Sciences-Po Paris and the Faculty of law of Paris (apart from Columbia Law School and University College London). She is currently an Associate Professor and President of the European Institute at the Hautes Etudes de Commerce in Paris.

Furthermore, she is the Founder and President of Cercle des Européens, a think-tank which operates as an ideas exchange group on socioeconomic and political stakes of the 21st century Europe. Cercle des Européens is known as a place where French and European decision makers can meet for roundtable discussions on different European problems and subjects. Noelle Lenoir is also President of the Comité Droit et Débat Public, which gathers lawyers interested in popularization of legal issues. She was also a member of the EC High Level Experts group on the European company law at the Commission level. She created in 2017 a European network "Ministers For Europe" (MFE) gathering former minister of Foreign or European Affairs to exchange views and publish common op-ed on European issues.

== Other activities ==
=== Corporate boards ===
Lenoir was administrator of Generali France (2008–2012), Compagnie des Alpes (2012–2018) and Valeo (2009–2019). She is currently administrator of Sopra-Steria.

=== Non-profit organisations ===
She is member of the Board of the Association of French Constitutional lawyers and of the Society for Comparative Law.

She was appointed by the Bureau of the French National Assembly as Chief Ethics Officer (2012–2014).

She was appointed as Chairman of the Radio France Ethics Committee (2017–2018).

She was appointed as Chairman of the Scientific and Ethics Committee of the Parcoursup platform by an order issued by the French Minister of Higher Education and Research. This committee is due to deliver an annual report on the functioning of this platform to the Parliament (2018–2019).

She is the Vice President of the French Committee of the International Chamber of Commerce (ICC France – since 2017).

== Other pro bono functions ==
- Member of the American Law Institute
- Distinguished Fellow of the Hastings Center
- Member of the French Academy of Technology

== Controversies ==
In 2015, both the rightwing Figaro and leftwing Libération newspapers published articles alleging potential conflicts of interests concerning her role with a pharmaceutical lab. In an interview with the Journal de Dimanche, she denied any conflict. In 2024 and 2025, she attracted attention after strenuous media defences of Israel and its armed forces during the Gaza conflict, becoming a favoured commentator of the CNews television channel. In August 2025, SOS Racisme filed a complaint against Noëlle Lenoir, accusing her of having made racist remarks about Algerians on a Vincent Bolloré channel.

== Press / media ==
Lenoir is a columnist on European matters for a variety of French newspapers. She was editor for the BFM radio station, France-Culture radio, France 24 TV station in partnership with HEC. She was responsible for the "Europe" blog of the L'Express weekly magazine till 2020. She has made several publications about the caricaturist Honoré Daumier. She is honorary President of the Society for the Friends of Daumier which she created in 1994.

Among others:

- La Transparence administrative (en coll., 1987) with Bruno Lasserre and Bernard Stirn)
- Aux Frontières de la Vie : une Ethique Biomédicale à la Française.
- Les Normes Internationales de la Bioéthique (1998)
- Relever le défi des Biogechnologies (2000)
- La Justice, de Daumier à nos jours (1999)
- La Vie Politique, de Daumier à nos jours (2005)
- La Societas Europaea ou SE : Pour une Citoyenneté Européenne de l'Entreprise (2007)
- L'Europe, de Daumier à nos jours (2017)

== Distinctions ==
- Grand officier de l'ordre national du Mérite (France)
- Officier de la Légion d'honneur (France)
- Grand officier de l'ordre de Léopold II (Belgium)
- Commandeur de l'ordre du Mérite (Poland)
- Commandeur de l'ordre du Mérite de la République fédérale d'Allemagne (Germany)

=== Other distinctions ===
- Honoris Causa, Suffolk University (US)
- Honoris Causa, University College London (UK)

== Teaching ==
Competition law and European Law at Paris 1 Panthéon-Sorbonne University

== Areas of practice ==
- Compliance, Environmental Social Responsibility, Anticorruption and International investigations at National and International level
- Public Business Law and Constitutional Law
- Data Protection, Privacy and Cybersecurity
- European and Competition Law
- Litigation
- Regulatory
