= Commission v Edith Cresson =

EU law case

- Court: European Court of Justice
- Citation: (2006) C-432/04, [2006] ECR I-6387

Keywords
- Free movement of goods

Commission v Edith Cresson (2006) C-432/04 is an EU law case, concerning the constitutional framework in the European Union.

== Facts ==
Mrs Edith Cresson was brought to trial at the European Court of Justice by the European Commission for giving her friend Berthelot, a dental surgeon, the role of political adviser through appointing him as a visiting scientist for two and a half years. This went against the maximum duration which was 24 months for visiting scientists. This was argued to be a breach of Article 213 EC Treaty (now Article 245 TFEU), under which members of the Commission had to respect the obligations arising from their office.

== Judgment ==
The Court of Justice, in full court, held that Mrs Cresson had breached her obligations under the Treaties.

== See also ==
- European Union law
