= Henri Nallet =

French politician (1939–2024)

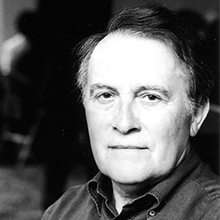
- Nallet in 2008

Honorary President of the fondation Jean-Jaurès
- In office 15 November 2022 – 29 May 2024
- Preceded by: Pierre Mauroy
- Succeeded by: Jean-Marc Ayrault

Keeper of the Seals, Minister of Justice
- In office 2 October 1990 – 2 April 1992
- President: François Mitterrand
- Prime Minister: Michel Rocard; Édith Cresson
- Governments: Rocard II; Cresson
- Preceded by: Pierre Arpaillange
- Succeeded by: Michel Vauzelle

Minister of Agriculture and Forests
- In office 12 May 1988 – 2 October 1990
- President: François Mitterrand
- Prime Minister: Michel Rocard
- Governments: Rocard I and II
- Preceded by: François Guillaume
- Succeeded by: Louis Mermaz

Minister of Agriculture
- In office 4 April 1985 – 20 March 1986
- President: François Mitterrand
- Prime Minister: Laurent Fabius
- Governments: Fabius
- Preceded by: Michel Rocard
- Succeeded by: François Guillaume

Deputy
- In office 12 June 1997 – 14 March 1999
- Legislature: XI of Fifth Republic
- Preceded by: Yves Van Haëcke
- Succeeded by: Jean-Yves Caullet
- Parliamentary group: Socialists and affiliated group
- Constituency: Yonne's 2nd constituency
- In office 23 June 1988 – 29 July 1988
- Legislature: IX of Fifth Republic
- Preceded by: Proportional by department
- Succeeded by: Léo Grézard
- Parliamentary group: Socialists and affiliated group
- Constituency: Yonne's 2nd constituency
- In office 2 April 1986 – 14 May 1988
- Legislature: VIII of Fifth Republic
- Parliamentary group: Socialists and affiliated group
- Constituency: Yonne

Mayor of Tonnerre
- In office March 1989 – June 1998
- Preceded by: Georges Roze
- Succeeded by: André Fourcade

Personal details
- Pronunciation: [ɑ̃ʁi nalɛ]
- Born: 6 January 1939 Bergerac, Dordogne, France
- Died: 29 May 2024 (aged 85) Paris, France
- Party: Socialist Party
- Spouse: Thérèse Leconte
- Children: 1 son (Vincent)
- Parents: Jean Nallet (father); France Lafon (mother)
- Education: Institut d'études politiques de Bordeaux
- Profession: Lawyer
- Awards: Commander of the Legion of Honour, 14 July 2015 (nomination suspended, but according to Libération effective 2021); Officer of the Legion of Honour, 11 July 2001; Commander of the Order of Agricultural Merit, as of 1986

Henri Nallet (French: [ɑ̃ʁi nalɛ]; 6 January 1939 – 29 May 2024) was a French politician. A member of the Socialist Party, he was Mayor of Tonnerre in the Department of Yonne from 1989 to 1998, the Deputy from Yonne, the Minister of Agriculture and the Minister of Justice. He presided over the High Council of Agricultural Cooperation (Fr: Haut conseil de la coopération agricole) and was Honorary President of the Fondation Jean-Jaurès.

== Biography ==
=== Before politics ===
An optician's son, Henri Nallet began his higher learning at the Institut d'études politiques de Bordeaux, from which he graduated first in his class in 1961. The next year, he left for Paris to further his studies there. In 1962, he earned a licentiate in public law, and then a graduate diploma (Fr: diplôme d’études supérieures) in political science in 1966, with a research paper on "Group Agriculture". In 1968, he further earned a certificate of aptitude in the legal profession.

It was at about this time that Nallet wed Thérèse Leconte, who was to become a journalist at Croissance des jeunes nations. They would have one son together, Vincent.

Active in youth movements, Nallet worked regularly with the Jeunesse Étudiante Chrétienne (JEC; sometimes "Young Christian Students" in English) beginning in 1961, before being elected its secretary-general in 1963. Until 1965, he was also Vice-President of the French Council of Youth Movements, then headed by Pierre Mauroy. Later finding himself at odds with the Catholic hierarchy, he left his directorial function at the JEC after being forced out in 1964 by Bishop Émile-Charles-Raymond Pirolley. This was the beginning of a crisis that would shake the Christian movement for several months in 1965.

Nallet was at the same time one of the founders, along with Nicolas Boulte and André Senik, of the Centre for Research and Revolutionary Intervention (Fr: Centre de recherche et d'intervention révolutionnaire), one of the think tanks that arose from May 68, and which served as a meeting point among Catholic, Protestant and atheist militants and as a publisher of political and social analyses.

From 1966 to 1973, Nallet was a journalist at the Protestant weekly Réforme and got to know Pierre Encrevé, Jean Baubérot and later Pierre Joxe, who was the one to convince him in 1980 to join François Mitterrand's campaign team.

Nallet's interest in the agricultural world and his experiences in the JEC led him, in 1965, to become an instructor at the Rural Manager Training Institute (Fr: Institut de formation des cadres paysans; IFOCAP), an association whose goal is to afford farmers holding responsibilities in professional organizations a higher level of training. That same year, he was called by the heads of the Fédération nationale des syndicats d'exploitants agricoles (FNSEA; National Federation of Agricultural Holders' Unions), notably Michel Debatisse, the secretary-general, to become the mission manager for economic affairs. He held the post until 1970, when after an ideological conflict, he left the FNSEA.

He then began a career as a researcher. While already a lecturer at Paris 1 Panthéon-Sorbonne University, he entered the Institut national de la recherche agronomique (INRA; National Institute of Agricultural Research) as a research assistant. He became head of research there in 1973, and then master and director of research at the department of rural economics and sociology until July 1981. His research activities gave rise to the publication of various studies, notably on trade unionism, agricultural politics, rural people's legal status, livestock breeding and dairy production. Beyond research, Nallet inspired, through his own work and work that he did with other researchers, new rural left-wing currents.

=== Political career ===
After François Mitterrand's victory in the 1981 French presidential election, Nallet found that his knowledge of the agricultural world and, particularly, his commitment as an activist stood him in good stead with the new president's Minister of Agriculture, Édith Cresson, and he thus became her unofficial adviser. Quickly thereafter he was called by the President of the Republic to the Élysée Palace, where he became a technical adviser, by decree on 6 July 1981, in charge of agricultural matters, communal problems and fishing. Files dealing with the environment were likewise entrusted to him in 1984. During this period, he followed on the president's behalf all agriculture-related files, took care of relations with professional organizations and participated, with the then Minister of Foreign Affairs Roland Dumas, in negotiations to expand the EEC by admitting Spain and Portugal.

In early April 1985, François Mitterrand chose Nallet as his Minister of Agriculture to succeed Michel Rocard, who had just resigned, in the portfolio. The press at the time made much of this surprising nomination: Henri Nallet, then unknown to the French people, seeming much more like a "technician with a gift of political sense" than a "politician", as Le Monde's 6 April 1985 edition put it (he would not officially join the Socialist Party until 1987). From the year when he first headed the Ministry of Agriculture, there were peaceful relations between those in power and the professional agricultural organizations, and from that beginning he supported Coluche's creation of the Restaurants du Cœur.

In the wake of the right's victory in the 16 March 1986 legislative elections, Nallet had to yield his portfolio to François Guillaume, while otherwise being elected as the Deputy from Yonne. He had at first dreamt of standing for a seat in the department of Manche, where his wife came from, and where the militant network as well as the Socialist Party federation had sought to have him stand, but Pierre Joxe had then convinced him to stand in Bourgogne, a region to which he had no links. It was nevertheless there that his whole career in local politics would unfold. Despite the change of government, the former minister kept until June 1987 his functions as the World Food Council's (WFC) president, and his interest in the great debates in agricultural politics did not wane.

In 1988, after François Mitterrand's reelection after a campaign in which Nallet had served as treasurer, Henri Nallet once again found himself at the Ministry of Agriculture, although now, the portfolio of Forests had been added to it, thus making Nallet the "Minister of Agriculture and Forests". Even though he won in the legislative elections that followed, he gave up his seat to his substitute, Léo Grézard. At the Ministry, Nallet further pursued reforms that he had undertaken in 1985. He got several important agricultural laws passed, among them one that spread the application of appellations d'origine contrôlée. He was involved in agricultural teaching and became an acknowledged expert in communal negotiation.

The year 1990 saw Nallet's place in the heart of government grow. On 2 October, when there was a cabinet shuffle, he in fact became the Keeper of the Seals, that is, the Minister of Justice, a portfolio that he kept after May 1991 in Édith Cresson's government, and until her resignation. Thereafter, Nallet then devoted himself mainly to his career in local politics. He kept his mandate as Mayor of Tonnerre, where he had been elected in 1989, and as a Yonne departmental councillor (canton of Tonnerre), which he had held since 1988. In December 1992, he was named Councillor of State.

In April 1991, the Urba affair broke, revolving around shady financing of the French Socialist Party involving Urba, a system set up by the Party in 1973 to procure funding. The examining magistrate (Fr: juge d'instruction), Thierry Jean-Pierre, had Urba's headquarters in Paris searched. Nallet, the Keeper of the Seals, denounced the judge's action as "une équipée sauvage" (roughly "a wild escapade") and had him removed.

Next, he began a career as a European and international consultant. Between 1992 and 1994, he put together successively two reports, one to be sent to the European Bank for Reconstruction and Development (EBRD), and the other to the European Commission. These works bore on Europe, and notably on the question of agricultural politics within the framework of European expansion. Some more specific missions were also entrusted to him as well, such as the observer's function at the elections in the Palestinian territories in 1996, on the European Union's behalf.

When Nallet was once again elected to the National Assembly in 1997, his knowledge of European institutions allowed him to be elected president of the Assembly's European Union delegation. As such, he published several reports on European questions and oversaw the transcription of community legislation into French law. He also chaired the committee overseeing preparations for the euro's introduction. In 1999, he was given the job of writing a report on the great multidisciplinary networks (Note: These "great multidisciplinary networks" (or "grands réseaux pluridisciplinaires" in French) are a phenomenon that arises when lawyers and certain other professionals, such as auditors, chartered accountants and consulting professionals come together in an internationalized world to help fulfil each other's needs, thus spawning certain worries about the legal profession's independence and secrecy. Nallet suggested dealing with these through transparency and control by the professions of these vast networks, along with ways in which the French legal establishment might successfully compete with multidisciplinary organizations and "Anglo-Saxon" firms in the field of business law. It is all detailed in Nallet's book Les Réseaux pluridisciplinaires et les Professions du droit, cited here.) by Dominique Strauss-Kahn, then the Minister of Economics and Finance and Élisabeth Guigou, the Minister of Justice.

Alongside all this, Nallet still retained his responsibilities in the core of the Socialist Party with regard to international relations. A member of the Party's national council in October 1993, and then a national bureau member in December 1994, he was chosen in 1995 to head the group of experts on European, international and military questions alongside Lionel Jospin, a 2002 presidential candidate. From 1997 to 1999, he was the Socialist Party's national secretary in charge of European issues, and finally, in 1999, national secretary in charge of international relations. He also acceded in 1998 to the vice-presidency of the Party of European Socialists (PES).

Late in the 1990s, Nallet was ending his political career in Yonne. Thus, in 1998, he left his seat as Mayor of Tonnerre to André Fourcade, the assistant mayor. The next year, he stepped down from his mandate as Deputy, leaving it to his substitute, and then, in 2001, he left his seats on Yonne general council and Tonnerre municipal council.

Beyond his public responsibilities, Nallet was vice-president, then president in 2013, and then in 2022 honorary president of the Fondation Jean-Jaurès, and president, between 2008 and 2012, of the Scientific Council of the Foundation for European Progressive Studies, the foundation of the Party of European Socialists, where Nallet regularly published notes and reports. He was, moreover, for years a member of Paris's bar ethics committee. Beginning in 2008, he was part of the administrative council of the Emergency Rights Association, a humanitarian organization created in 1995, which fosters access to the law by those most deprived, and which participates in the struggle against exclusion.

=== Death ===
Nallet died on 29 May 2024 in Paris at the age of 85. He had been suffering a number of health problems.

== Controversies ==
Between June 1997 and December 2008, Nallet was employed by the group Servier. He was successively Director in Charge of International Development, Director General of External Affairs and Communication, Director of European Affairs and then President Jacques Servier's adviser. As such, he was heard as an assisted witness in December 2013 in the Mediator Affair, accused of influence peddling. Between 2009 and 2013, Nallet exercised the function of consultant with the group "for a very important yearly revenue estimated at €812,000". His elevation to Commander of the Legion of Honour on 14 July 2015 raised reservations, and his nomination was thus suspended. Nevertheless, it seems to have been fulfilled in 2021.

== Archives ==
Henri Nallet's archives are kept at the French National Archives and form the fonds 108/AJ.
