= Marc Monchal =

French Army general (1935–2020)

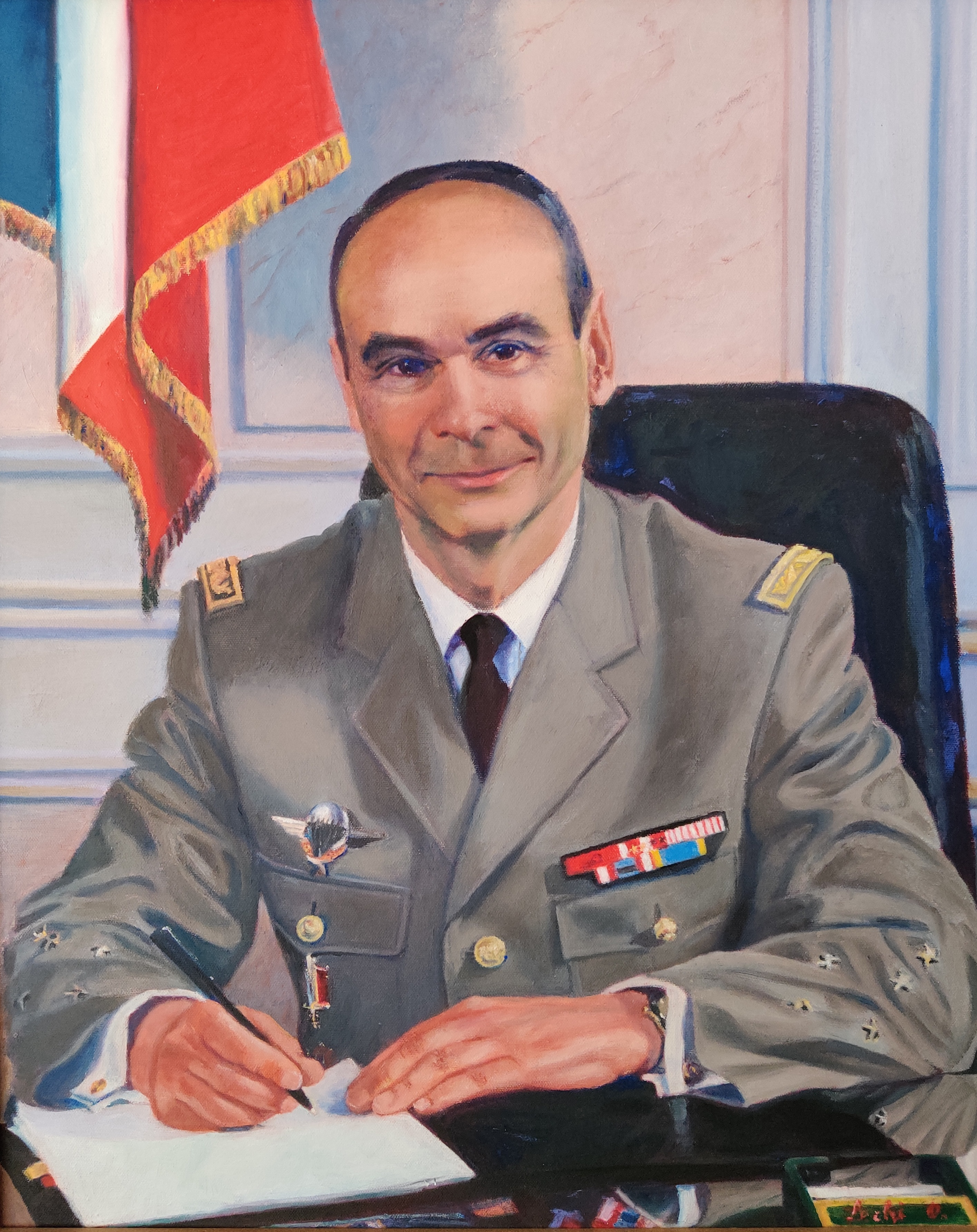
- Portrait of Marc Monchal
- Born: 27 August 1935; Die, France
- Died: 12 November 2020 (aged 85)
- Alma mater: École spéciale militaire de Saint-Cyr
- Military career
- Allegiance: France
- Branch: Army
- Service years: 1954–1996
- Rank: General
- Unit: 24th Artillery Regiment
- Commands: 35th Parachute Artillery Regiment
- Conflicts: Algerian War; Yugoslav Wars
- Awards: Grand Cross of the Legion of Honour; Cross for Military Valour; Combatant's Cross; North Africa Security and Order Operations Commemorative Medal; Order of Merit of the Federal Republic of Germany

Marc Monchal (27 August 1935 – 12 November 2020) was a French army general. In addition to his status as an army general, he served as Chief of Staff of the French Army from 17 April 1991 to 27 August 1996 after having been Head of the Minister of Defence's military cabinet from 17 April 1989 to 17 May 1991.

== Biography ==
At the age of one, Monchal lost his father. His mother worked as a grocer during his youth. He was admitted to the École spéciale militaire de Saint-Cyr in 1954 and he chose to serve in the artillery. He then attended the École d’application de l’Artillerie in Metz.

Monchal served in the Algerian War in the 24th Artillery Regiment, then in the 35th Parachute Artillery Regiment, where he was promoted to brigadier general in June 1984.

In April 1989, Minister of Armed Forced Jean-Pierre Chevènement named Monchal Head of the Minister of Defence's military cabinet, succeeding Jacques Lanxade. In April 1991, he accepted the position of Chief of Staff of the French Army, leaving his previous post to Jean Rannou. During his tenure as head of the French Army, he led France through the Yugoslav Wars and the Rwandan genocide. In 1996, the year he turned 61, he retired from the Army and left his position to Philippe Mercier. During his tenure, he created the Cellule d’aide aux blessés de l’armée de Terre, founded in 1993.

From 17 October 1996 to 17 October 2001, he served on the Conseiller d'État. Marc Monchal died on 12 November 2020 at the age of 85.

== Decorations ==
- Grand Cross of the Legion of Honour (2015) (Grand Officer in 1995, Commander in 1991)
- Cross for Military Valour
- Combatant's Cross
- North Africa Security and Order Operations Commemorative Medal
- Médaille de la jeunesse, des sports et de l'engagement associatif
- Order of Merit of the Federal Republic of Germany
