= Military Cabinet (Prussia) =

Historic government body in Prussia

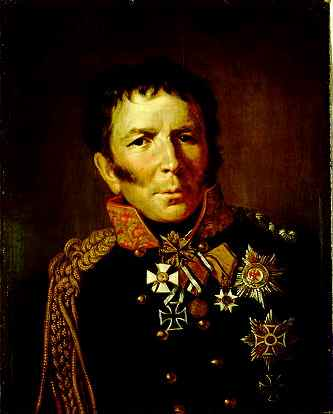
Hermann von Boyen, 2nd Chief of the Prussian Military Cabinet

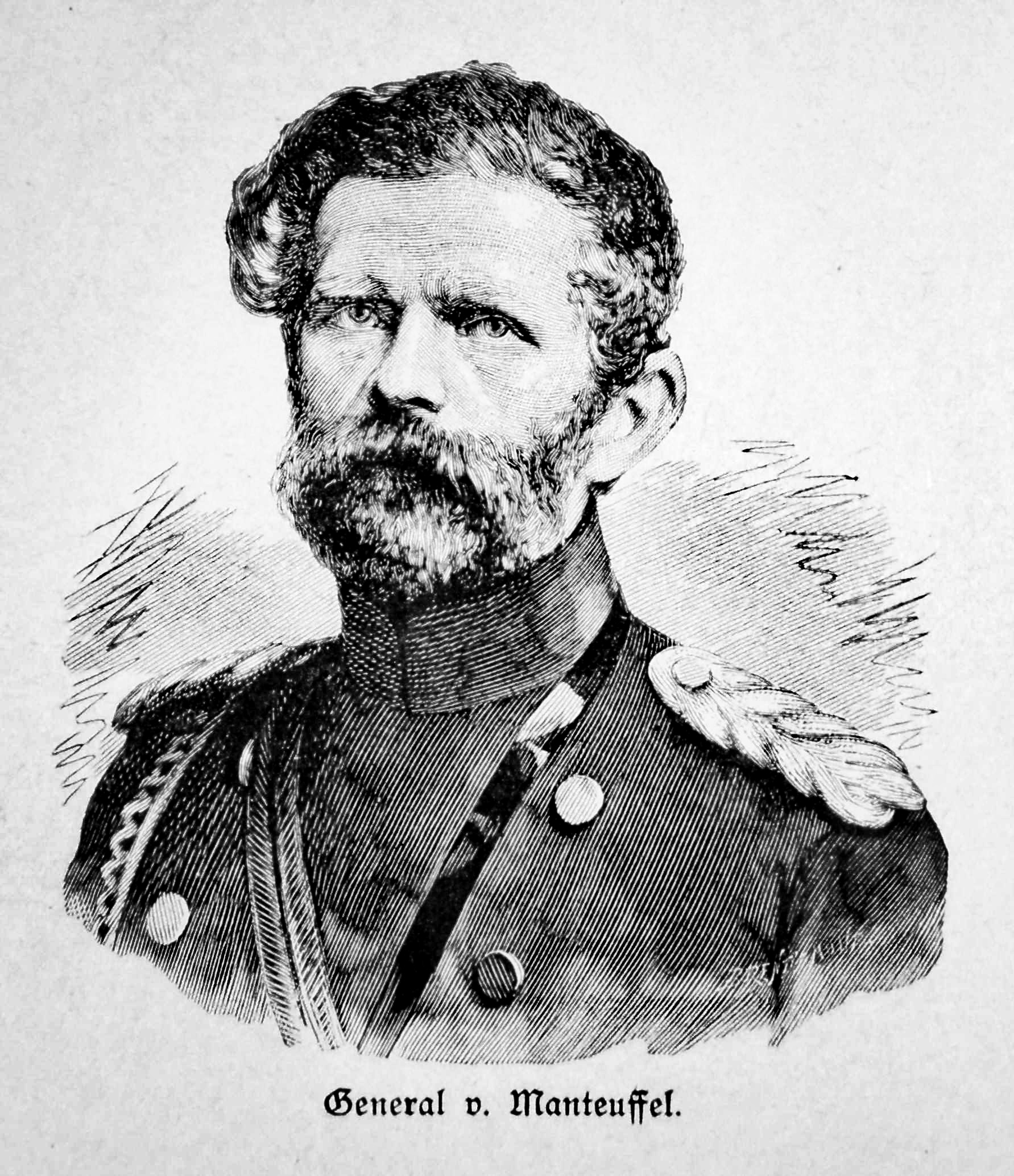
Edwin von Manteuffel, portrait by Richard Brend'amour

The Military Cabinet (Militärkabinett) was a military advisory body under the direct command of the King of Prussia, and by extension the German Emperor after 1871, for handling personnel matters of the army officer corps. It emerged from the Prussian Army personnel department in the wake of the 1809 reform of the military, and was officially established 3 June 1814. It developed under Emperor Wilhelm II into a personal instrument of the monarch for processing all military matters.

The Chief of the Military Cabinet (Chef des Militärkabinetts) was often at the same time Adjutant General (chief aide-de-camp) to the monarch and subordinate only to him. The king appointed all members of the Military Cabinet and the chief had the coveted Immediatvortrag, direct personal access to the king, which even the chief of the Great General Staff and the Minister of War did not have. The cabinet was essentially a privy council to the monarch and its constitutional position was unclear.

It was modernized under the leadership of Edwin Freiherr von Manteuffel, from 1856/1857 to 1865. During Austro-Prussian War of 1866 and the 1870–71 Franco-Prussian War the chief of the Military Cabinet was a member of the army headquarters staff.

With the emergence of the Imperial German Army after 1871 the powers of the Military Cabinet were enlarged. It remained a Prussian authority and functioned as the cabinet of the imperial army command. Until 1918 it was officially the "Military Cabinet of His Majesty the Emperor and King". The chief handled normal communications between the Emperor and other military authorities and was the only military officer to meet with the Emperor several times a week. Over time the cabinet became a great center of power. It had great influence on Wilhelm I, and gained even more on Wilhelm II.

During the First World War, the Military Cabinet lost favor to the Third Supreme Command of Hindenburg and Ludendorff. With the overthrow of the monarchy the Military Cabinet became the "Personnel Office of War Ministry" (Personalamt im Kriegsministerium) on 7 December 1918.

== Chiefs of the Militärkabinett ==
- 1808 Karl Wilhelm Georg von Grolman
- 1810 Hermann von Boyen
- 1816 Ludwig Gustav von Thile
- 1818 Job von Witzleben
- 1834 Friedrich Karl David von Lindheim
- 1841 August Wilhelm von Neumann-Cosel
- 1848 Friedrich Ludwig Robert Johann von Schoeler
- 1857 Edwin von Manteuffel
- 1864 Hermann von Tresckow
- 1871 Emil von Albedyll
- 1888 Wilhelm von Hahnke
- 1901 Dietrich von Hülsen-Haeseler
- 1908 Moriz von Lyncker
- 1918 Ulrich von Marschall
