= Urba affair =

French political financing scandal, 1973–1997

The Urba affair was a political financing scandal in France involving the covert funding of the Parti socialiste (PS) through kickbacks from companies awarded public works contracts. The system was created in 1971, two years after the Épinay Congress that formed the modern PS under François Mitterrand; the Urba consultancy was formally established in 1973. Its ostensible purpose was to advise Socialist-led communes on infrastructure and public works. The scheme operated until 1990 and gave rise to criminal proceedings that concluded in 1997.

== Background ==
In the 1970s, French political parties received no state funding, and the rising cost of electoral campaigns — already notable in the 1965 French presidential election — pushed the PS leadership to seek alternative financing. Unable to secure state funding through legislation, the party constructed a centralized system based on false invoices (fausses factures).

Companies paid 2–4% of a contract's value to affiliated consultancies — including Urba, SAGES, and BLE — to win contracts in Socialist-run municipalities. In practice, the Urba network operated as a groupement d'intérêt économique (GIE) called GSR, comprising several linked firms: Urbatechnic, Urbaconseil, Gracco, Valorimo, and Mercure International. These firms retained 40% of commissions and remitted 30% to the national PS and 30% to the relevant local federation. The system operated from 1973 to 1990. A parallel scheme — the Gifco affair — operated the same way for the French Communist Party.

== Discovery ==
The affair became public in 1989. On 17 April, police inspector Antoine Gaudino of the financial section of the Marseille Regional Judicial Police (SRPJ), investigating a related false-invoices case, searched Urba's Marseille offices and discovered the notebooks of Joseph Delcroix, a PS activist who had meticulously recorded all of Urba's meetings across four school exercise books. Gaudino detained Delcroix — former director of Urba-Gracco in Paris — and Bruno Desjobert, director of Urba Marseille. Among the notebook entries was one dated 4 July 1987 stating that "the first forecasts for the presidential campaign are situated at 100,000 francs. 25,000,000 francs will be assumed by the GIE [Urba-Graco]" — a direct documentary link between the scheme and Mitterrand's 1988 presidential campaign. A second search on 19 April found that Urba CEO Gérard Monate had ordered his secretary to conceal the company's accounts. Monate had also intervened with government ministers to have the matter "arranged."

Gaudino and his colleague Alain Mayot spent three years attempting to bring the case to court, blocked at each stage by the executive. The prosecution initially refused to open a judicial inquiry; Gaudino was transferred to another department; both officers were eventually removed from the case. Gaudino published his findings in L'Enquête impossible (Albin Michel, 1990), alleging that Urba funds had financed Mitterrand's 1988 presidential campaign. Interior Minister Philippe Marchand dismissed him from the police in March 1991.

== The amnesty ==
As the investigation advanced, the Rocard government responded with legislation. In autumn 1989 it introduced a political financing reform bill, attempting to attach an amnesty clause covering corruption offences committed before 15 June 1989. An initial attempt failed after press leaks prompted public outcry. On the night of 22 December 1989, with only a small number of Socialist MPs present, the National Assembly passed a version of the bill including the amnesty. The Conseil constitutionnel, presided by Robert Badinter, struck out the clause exempting sitting MPs, meaning the PS leadership responsible for the 1988 campaign finances escaped prosecution entirely.

== Judicial proceedings ==
In January 1991 a former Socialist official told investigators that Urba and similar firms had been collecting commissions for the PS, prompting the Le Mans examining magistrate Thierry Jean-Pierre to open a formal inquiry. On 7 April 1991, after raiding Urba's Paris offices, Justice Minister Henri Nallet immediately removed Jean-Pierre from the case — who had served as treasurer of Mitterrand's 1988 presidential campaign. Nallet described the raid as an «équipée sauvage» ("wild escapade"); his deputy Georges Kiejman called it a "judicial burglary." The Angers court of appeal ruled the procedure lawful, and the Cour de cassation upheld this ruling. Judge Renaud Van Ruymbeke took over the case in late 1991, raided PS headquarters in Paris, and placed Henri Emmanuelli under formal investigation in September 1992.

Emmanuelli, who had served as PS treasurer and later as president of the National Assembly, was convicted on 16 December 1997 of complicity in influence peddling. He received an 18-month suspended prison sentence and two years' deprivation of civic rights. Urba's former CEO Gérard Monate was also convicted. André Laignel, a co-defendant, was acquitted.

The affair also had indirect consequences for Prime Minister Pierre Bérégovoy. His creditor Roger-Patrice Pelat — who had given him an interest-free loan of one million francs, later revealed by Le Canard Enchaîné — was implicated in both the Urba funding network and the separate Pechiney-Triangle affair. Bérégovoy committed suicide on 1 May 1993, shortly after the Socialists lost parliamentary elections.

A court placed Urba in judicial liquidation in January 1990. The affair directly prompted three laws establishing state financing of political parties: the law of January 1990, a further law in January 1993, and the Séguin law of January 1995.

== See also ==
- Gifco affair
- Pechiney-Triangle affair
- Henri Emmanuelli
- Political financing in France
