= Edwige Avice =

French politician

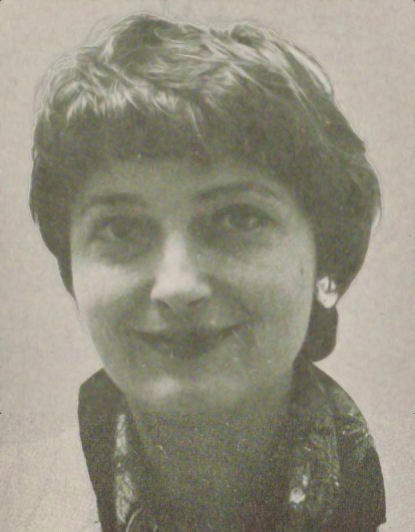
- Avice in 1981

Minister of Cooperation and Development
- In office 17 May 1991 – 2 April 1992
- President: François Mitterrand
- Prime Minister: Édith Cresson
- Preceded by: Jacques Pelletier
- Succeeded by: Marcel Debarge

Minister delegate to the Minister of Foreign Affairs
- In office 28 June 1988 – 17 May 1991
- President: François Mitterrand
- Prime Minister: Michel Rocard

Secretary of State to the Minister of Defence
- In office 27 July 1984 – 20 March 1986
- President: François Mitterrand
- Prime Minister: Laurent Fabius

Minister delegate for Leisure, Youth and Sports
- In office 22 May 1981 – 27 July 1984
- President: François Mitterrand
- Prime Minister: Pierre Mauroy

Personal details
- Born: April 13, 1945 (age 81) Nevers, France
- Party: Socialist Party

Edwige Avice (born 13 April 1945 in Nevers, France) is a French politician.

== Early life and education ==
Avice graduated from Sciences Po and worked in the international department of the Crédit lyonnais before serving as a policy officer in the Paris hospitals administration.
