= Charles Pasqua =

French politician (1927–2015)

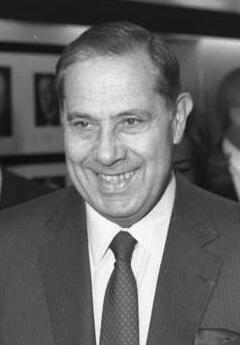
- Pasqua in 1987

Minister of the Interior
- In office 29 March 1993 – 11 May 1995
- Prime Minister: Édouard Balladur
- Preceded by: Paul Quilès
- Succeeded by: Jean-Louis Debré
- In office 20 March 1986 – 10 May 1988
- Prime Minister: Jacques Chirac
- Preceded by: Pierre Joxe
- Succeeded by: Pierre Joxe

Personal details
- Born: Charles Victor Pasqua; 18 April 1927 Grasse, France
- Died: 29 June 2015 (aged 88) Suresnes, France
- Party: Rally for France (1999–2002)
- Other political affiliations: Rally of the French People (1947–1955); Union for the New Republic (1958–1968); Union of Democrats for the Republic (1968–1976); Rally for the Republic (1976–1999)
- Spouse: Jeanne Joly (m. 1947)
- Children: 1

Charles Victor Pasqua (French: [ʃaʁl paskwa]; 18 April 1927 – 29 June 2015) was a French businessman and Gaullist politician. He was Interior Minister from 1986 to 1988, under Jacques Chirac's cohabitation government, and also from 1993 to 1995, under the government of Edouard Balladur.

== Early life and family background ==
Pasqua was born on 18 April 1927 in Grasse, Alpes-Maritimes. His paternal grandfather was a shepherd from Casevecchie, Corsica and he could speak Corsican fluently. As of 1987, his cousin served as the mayor of Casevecchie.

During World War II, Pasqua joined the French Resistance at the age of sixteen.

He subsequently received his Baccalauréat, followed by a degree in Law.

== Business career ==
From 1952 to 1971 Pasqua worked for Ricard, a producer of alcoholic beverages (most notably pastis), starting as a salesman.

In 1971, he founded Euralim, also known as Europe-Alimentation, an importer of Americano, a cocktail made by the Italian company Gancia.

== Politics ==
In 1947, Pasqua helped create the section of the Gaullist Party RPF movement for the Alpes-Maritimes. With Jacques Foccart and Achille Peretti, he was the co-founder of the Service d'Action Civique (SAC) in 1959 to counter the terrorist actions of the OAS during the Algerian War of Independence (1954–1962). The SAC would be charged with the underground actions of the Gaullist movement and participated in the organization of the 30 May 1968 Gaullist counter-demonstration.

From 1968 to 1973, Pasqua was deputy to the French National Assembly for the Hauts-de-Seine département for the UDR party, of which he was a leading member from 1974 to 1976. He helped Jacques Chirac to take the lead of the party and participated in its transformation into the Rally for the Republic (RPR). Counsellor of Jacques Chirac alongside Marie-France Garaud, he was in charge of the organisation of Chirac's campaign for the 1981 presidential election, won by the candidate of the Socialist Party (PS), François Mitterrand (1981–1995). As such, he is considered to be Chirac's mentor in politics.

From 1981 to 1986 Pasqua was senator for the Hauts-de-Seine, then president of the RPR group in the Senate. From 1986 to 1988 he was Interior Minister (in charge of law enforcement). In 1992, he called a vote against the ratification of the Maastricht Treaty. He became Interior Minister again from 1993 to 1995, and supported the candidacy of Edouard Balladur at the 1995 presidential election. He is mostly remembered for having pushed a series of anti-immigration laws (lois Pasqua), and for his declaration "we will terrorize the terrorists."

Pasqua headed the Rally for France (RPF), a sovereigntist (Eurosceptic) party, for a while in association with Philippe de Villiers. At the 1999 European Parliament election, their list got ahead of the RPR list. He served as the President of the General Council of the Hauts-de-Seine from 1988 to 2004. In 2004, he was elected senator by an electoral college.

In 2005, a US Senate report accused him, along with the British Respect politician George Galloway, of profiting illegally from the UN's oil-for-food scheme. He and other French defendants were cleared of all charges in 2013 by a Paris court.

In 2008, Pasqua was convicted of illegal lobbying in the Mitterrand–Pasqua affair during his time serving as French Interior Minister. Sentenced in 2009 to serve one year of a three-year jail term, he was acquitted on appeal in 2011.

== Personal life and death ==
Pasqua was married to Jeanne Joly, from Quebec, Canada. They had a son, Pierre-Philippe Pasqua, who died in February 2015.

He died of a heart attack on 29 June 2015 at the Foch Hospital in Suresnes, near Paris.

Political offices
| Preceded by Pierre Joxe | Minister of the Interior; 1986–1988 | Succeeded by Pierre Joxe |
| Preceded by Paul Quilès | Minister of the Interior; 1993–1995 | Succeeded by Jean-Louis Debré |
