= Fondation Jean-Jaurès =

French think tank

The Fondation Jean-Jaurès (FJJ) is a French think tank associated with the Socialist Party. It was founded in 1992. Its founding president was Pierre Mauroy, followed by Henri Nallet. Its current president is Gilles Finchelstein. It published books and organizes conferences. For example, it organized a conference on socialism and culture in January 2017.
