= Head of the Minister of Defence's military cabinet (France) =

The Head of the Minister of Defence's military cabinet is the head of the military cabinet and staff of the Minister of Defence within the military and government of France.

== List ==
- General André Martin (1958–1959)
- Counter Admiral Yves Goupil (April 1984 – March 1988)
- Admiral Jacques Lanxade (March 1988 – April 1989)
- General Marc Monchal (17 April 1989 –17 May 1991)
- General Jean Rannou (17 May 1991 – 23 May 1994)
- General Philippe Mercier (24 May 1994 – 31 August 1995)
- General Raymond Germanos (1 September 1995 – 14 July 1998)
- General Bernard Thorette (15 July 1998 – 31 July 2002)
- Vice Admiral François Dupont (1 August 2002 – 31 August 2005)
- Counter Admiral Xavier Païtard (1 September 2005 – 30 August 2010)
- General Denis Mercier (30 August 2010 – 10 September 2012)
- General Antoine Noguier (10 September 2012 – 1 August 2014)
- Counter Admiral Pascal Ausseur (1 August 2014 – 2 August 2015)
- Vice Admiral Jean Casabianca (2 August 2015 – 1 September 2018)
- Counter Admiral Pierre Vandier (1 September 2018 – 1 September 2020)
- General Fabien Mandon (since 1 September 2020)
