= Catherine Nay =

French journalist (born 1943)

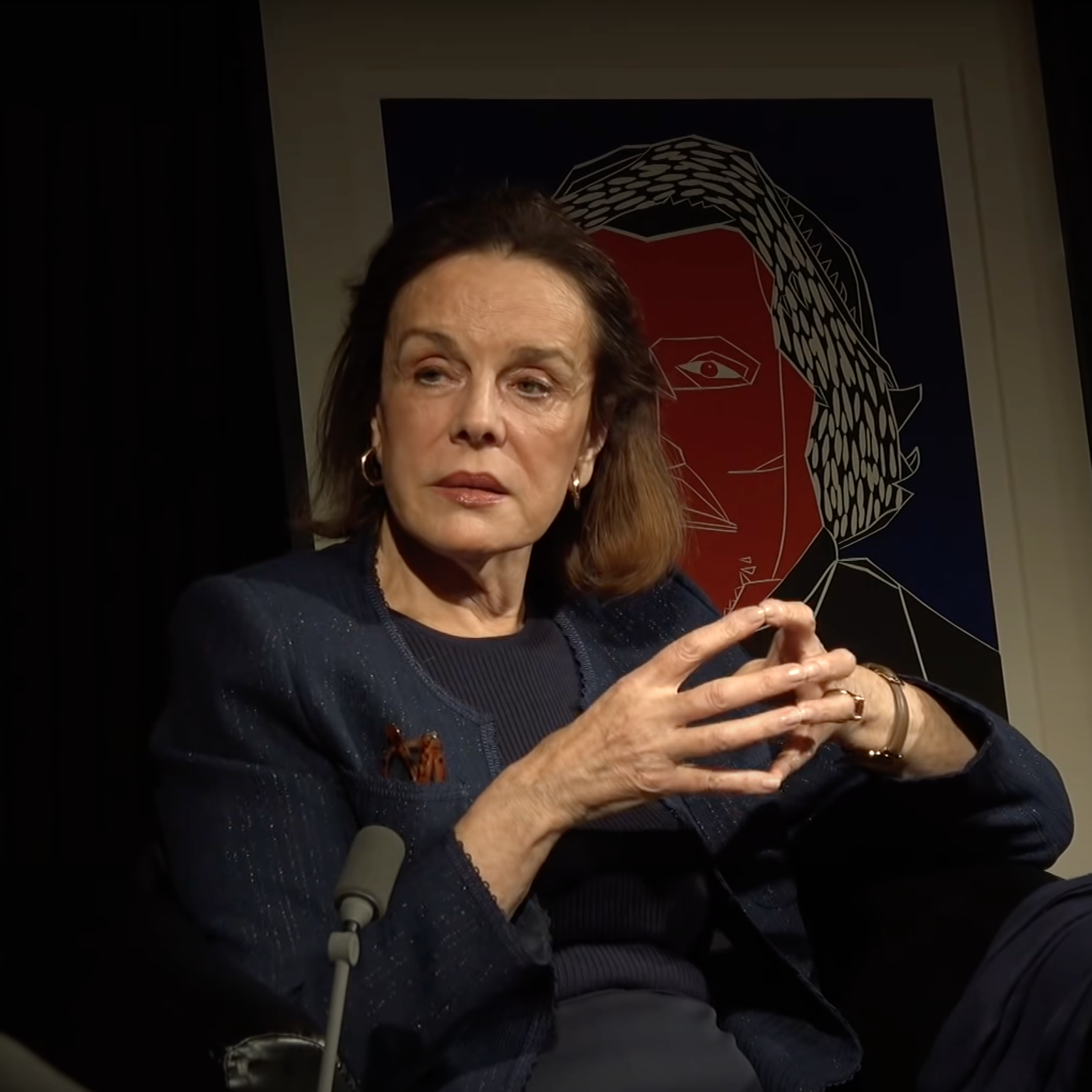
- Nay in 2019
- Born: 1 January 1943 (age 83); Tours, France
- Occupation: Journalist
- Spouse: Albin Chalandon (m. 2016; died 2020)

Catherine Nay (born 1 January 1943) is a French journalist and political commentator.

== Biography ==
After she attended primary and secondary schools in Périgueux, Nay started studying law but dropped in license year to become a journalist. In 1968, at the age of 25, she was hired by the political service of the newspaper L'Express led by Jean-Jacques Servan-Schreiber, where she covered right-wing politics. From 1975, Nay made a major part of her career at radio station Europe 1.

In 2005, she became an advisor to Europe 1's chairman Jean-Pierre Elkabbach. In 2008–9, she appeared several times in Le Grand Journal (Canal+) as a political commentator along with Alain Duhamel, Philippe Val and Jean-Michel Aphatie.

Since 2007, Nay has appeared regularly in Les grandes voix d'Europe 1 on Saturdays. Since 2011, she has been a cast member of Il n'y en a pas deux comme Elle hosted by Marion Ruggieri on Europe 1. In April 2012, she was a jury member of Qui veut devenir président ? broadcast by France 4.

Upon the commemoration of the May 1958 and May 1968 events, Nay's first documentary film was broadcast by France 3 in prime time at the end of May 2018.

For a long time Nay lived with politician and Elf Aquitaine's former leader Albin Chalandon, whom she had met at the political convention of the UNR party. Chalandon married Nay in 2016, after the death of his wife Salomé from whom he had not divorced.

Nay was made an Officier of the National Order of Merit.

== Published works ==
- La Double Méprise (in French). Paris: Grasset. 1980. ISBN 978-2-246-25241-2.
- Le Noir et le Rouge, ou l'Histoire d'une ambition (in French). Paris: Grasset. 1984. ISBN 978-2-246-28191-7.
- Les Sept Mitterrand, ou les Métamorphoses d'un septennat (in French). Paris: Grasset. 1987. ISBN 978-2-246-36291-3.
- Le Dauphin et le Régent (in French). Paris: Grasset. 1994. ISBN 978-2-246-47171-4.
- Un pouvoir nommé désir (in French). Paris: Grasset. 2007. ISBN 978-2-246-68001-7.
- L'Impétueux : Tourments, tourmentes, crises et tempêtes (in French). Paris: Grasset. 2012. ISBN 978-2-246-79010-5.
- Souvenirs, souvenirs… Tome 1 (in French). Paris: Robert Laffont. 2019. ISBN 978-2-221-19074-6.
- Tu le sais bien, le temps passe. Souvenirs, souvenirs… Tome 2 (in French). Paris: Bouquins. 2021. ISBN 978-2-382-92104-3.
