= Pierre Arpaillange =

French author, senior judge and Government Minister

Keeper of the Seals, Minister of Justice
- In office 12 May 1988 – 2 October 1990
- President: François Mitterrand
- Prime Minister: Michel Rocard
- Preceded by: Albin Chalandon
- Succeeded by: Henri Nallet

First President of the Court of Audit
- In office 8 October 1990 – 13 March 1993
- Preceded by: André Chandernagor
- Succeeded by: Pierre Joxe

Personal details
- Born: Pierre Raymond Arpaillange; 13 March 1924 Carlux, Dordogne, France
- Died: 11 January 2017 (aged 92) Le Cannet, France

Pierre Arpaillange (13 March 1924 – 11 January 2017) was a French author, senior judge and Government Minister.

== Career ==
After obtaining his law degree, Arpaillange began a judicial career in 1949. He became Secrétaire Général du Parquet de la Cour d'Appel de Paris ("Secretary Prosecutor General of the Paris Court of Appeal") and Secrétaire Général du Parquet de la Cour de Cassation ("Secretary Prosecutor General of the Cour de Cassation") in 1962.

Seconded to the Ministry of Justice from 1965 to 1974, Arpaillange became adviser to the Minister and, on several occasions, Chief of Staff for the Minister of Justice and Director of Criminal Affairs and Pardons at the Chancellery. He was also a member of the Haut Conseil de l'Audiovisuel ("High Council for the Audiovisual Industry") in 1973.

Adviser to the Supreme Court from 1974, he was promoted to Attorney General at the Cour de Cassation in 1984. He became Keeper of the Seals and Minister of Justice in Michel Rocard's first and second governments (12 May 1988 to 1 October 1990). He famously committed a verbal blunder in the National Assembly during a 1990 debate, stating: "In 1989, out of 52 escapees, we've recaptured 53."

He left the government in 1990 to serve as a member of the Comité d'Honneur du Bicentenaire de la Cour des Comptes ("Bicentennial Committee of Honour of the Cour des Comptes").

== Decorations ==
- In 1991, François Mitterrand made him Grand Officer of the Order of the Legion of Honour.
- He was entitled to wear the Croix du combattant volontaire de la Résistance ("Cross of Volunteer for the Resistance").
- Officer of the Palmes Académiques ("Academic Palms").

== Books ==
He authored La simple justice (Julliard, 1980) ("Simple Justice").

== Sources ==
This article was translated from its counterpart on the French Wikipedia on 16 March 2009, and its sources are listed there.
