= Military cabinet =

A military cabinet is any cabinet composed of members of the military. It may be an advisory body (staff) to a sovereign, head of government or other functionary, such as a minister of war, or it may be the executive cabinet of a military government.

- Military Cabinet (Prussia), the German emperor's privy council concerning army personnel matters

In France, both the prime minister and the minister of defence have their own military cabinets (cabinets militaires).

- Head of the Prime Minister's military cabinet
- Head of the Minister of Defence's military cabinet

Historically, the rulers of France's colonies, such as the Resident-General in Morocco and the Governor-General of Indochina, had their own military cabinets.
