= Philippe Marchand =

French politician

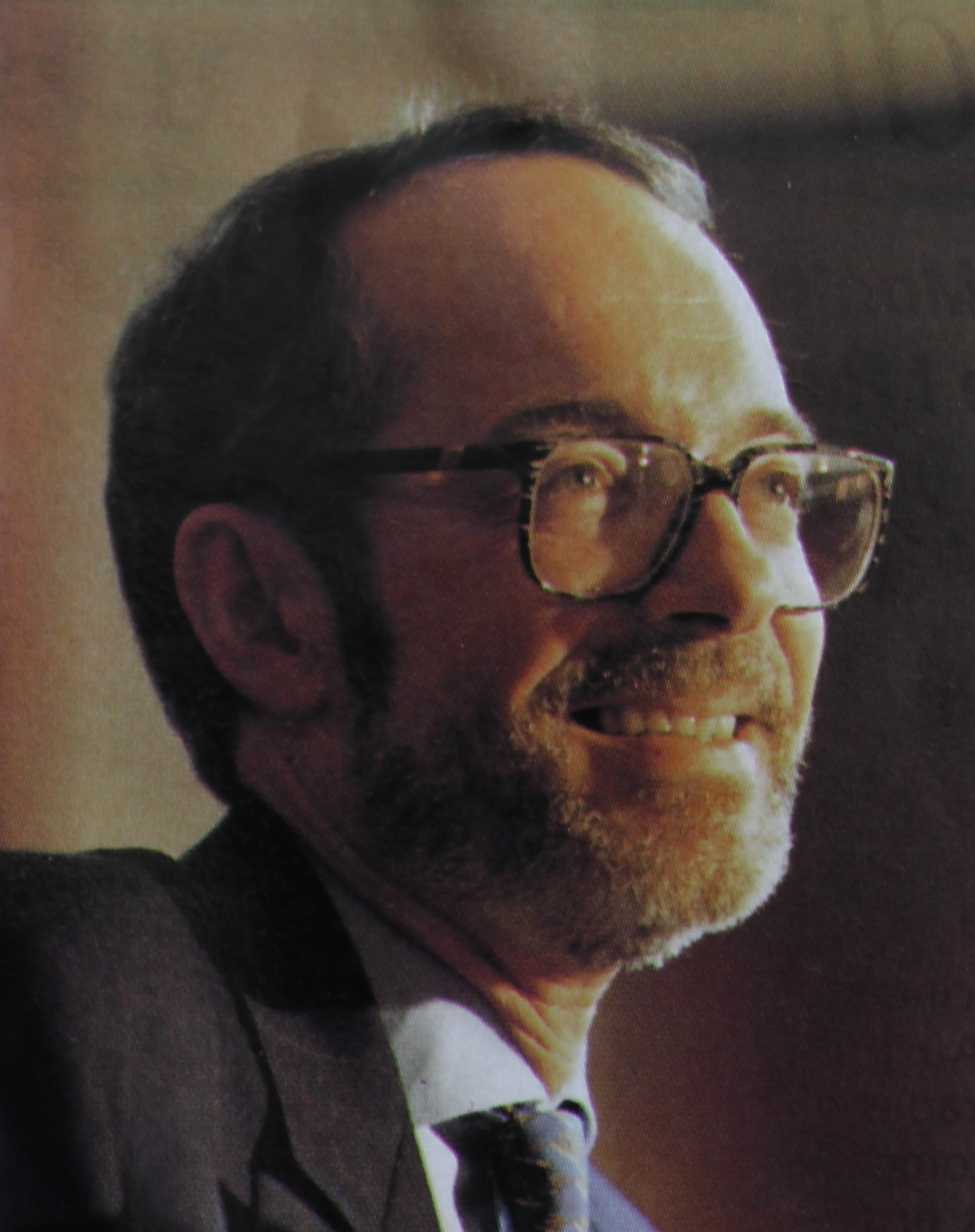

Minister of the Interior
- In office 1991–1992
- President: François Mitterrand
- Prime Minister: Michel Rocard; Édith Cresson
- Preceded by: Pierre Joxe
- Succeeded by: Paul Quilès

Member of the National Assembly for Charente-Maritime's 4th constituency
- In office 1979–1990
- Preceded by: Louis Joanne
- Succeeded by: Pierre-Jean Daviaud

Personal details
- Born: 1 September 1939 Angoulême, France
- Died: 10 January 2018 (aged 78) Saintes, France
- Party: Socialist Party

Philippe Marchand (French pronunciation: [filip maʁʃɑ̃]; 1 September 1939 – 10 January 2018) was a French politician. He was Minister of the Interior from 1991 until 1992, a member of the Parliament and President of the general council of Charente-Maritime.

== Biography ==
Marchand was born in Angoulême, Charente. He failed to act to establish the Giacometti Foundation. He called for resignations after the George Habash affair.

Marchand died in Saintes, Charente-Maritime.

Political offices
Preceded by Pierre Joxe	Minister of the Interior; 1991-1992	Succeeded by Paul Quilès
