= André Petit (general) =

French military officer (1909–1999)

André Louis Marie Petit (13 December 1909 – 12 September 1999) was a French Army general. He was dismissed from the Army and imprisoned for participating in the 1961 Algiers putsch. He was later amnestied and restored in his rank.

He also served as head of the Prime Minister's military cabinet from 1959 to 1960 under Michel Debré.
