= Thuré =

- Commune
- Location of Thuré
- Location within France Location within Nouvelle-Aquitaine
- Coordinates: 46°49′59″N 0°27′37″E
- Country: France
- Region: Nouvelle-Aquitaine
- Department: Vienne
- Arrondissement: Châtellerault
- Canton: Châtellerault-1
- Intercommunality: CA Grand Châtellerault

Government
  - Mayor (2020–2026): Dominique Chaine
- Area^{1}: 43.47 km^{2} (16.78 sq mi)
- Elevation: 61 m (200 ft)
- Highest elevation: 166 m (545 ft)
- Lowest elevation: 52 m (171 ft)
- Population (2023): 2,765
  - Density: 63.61/km^{2} (164.7/sq mi)
- Time zone: UTC+01:00 (CET)
  - Summer (DST): UTC+02:00 (CEST)
- INSEE/Postal code: 86272 /86540
- ^{1} French Land Register data, which excludes lakes, ponds, glaciers > 1 km^{2} (0.386 sq mi or 247 acres) and river estuaries.

Thuré (French pronunciation: [tyʁe]) is a commune in the Vienne department in the Nouvelle-Aquitaine region in western France.

== Demographics ==
Historical population
Year	Pop.	±% p.a.
1968	1,704	—
1975	2,127	+3.22%
1982	2,249	+0.80%
1990	2,335	+0.47%
1999	2,512	+0.82%
2007	2,762	+1.19%
2012	2,877	+0.82%
2017	2,878	+0.01%
2023	2,765	−0.67%
Source: INSEE

== See also ==
- Communes of the Vienne department
