= Paul Quilès =

French politician (1942–2021)

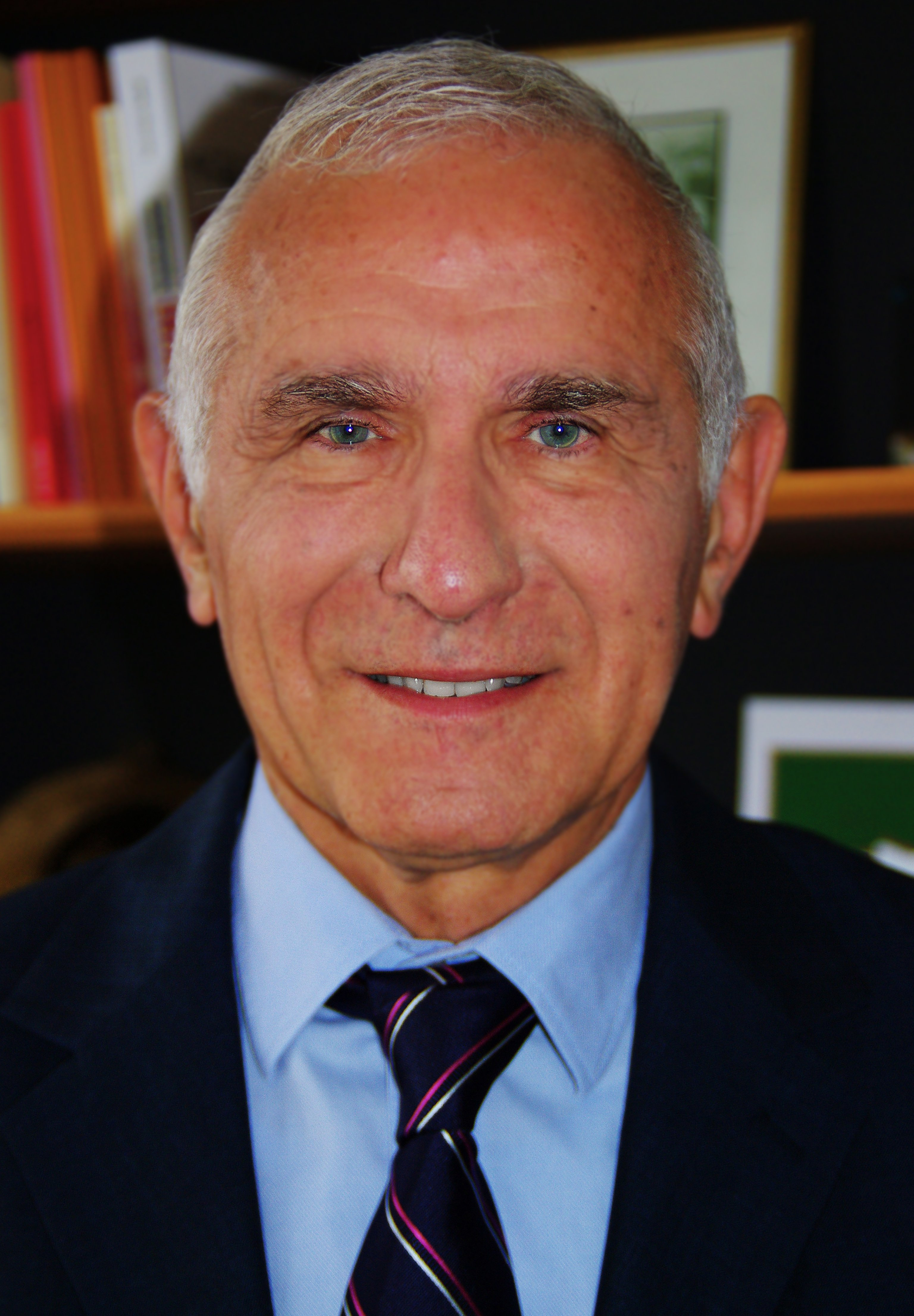
- Quilès in 2012

Mayor of Cordes-sur-Ciel
- In office 25 June 1995 – 28 May 2020
- Preceded by: Robert Ramond
- Succeeded by: Bernard Andrieu

Minister of Defence
- In office 20 September 1985 – 20 March 1986
- President: François Mitterrand
- Prime Minister: Laurent Fabius
- Preceded by: Charles Hernu
- Succeeded by: André Giraud

Minister of the Interior
- In office 2 April 1992 – 29 March 1993
- President: François Mitterrand
- Prime Minister: Pierre Bérégovoy
- Preceded by: Philippe Marchand
- Succeeded by: Charles Pasqua

Member of the National Assembly for Tarn's 1st constituency
- In office 1993–2007
- Preceded by: Pierre Bernard
- Succeeded by: Jacques Valax

Personal details
- Born: 27 January 1942 Sig, French Algeria, Vichy France (now Algeria)
- Died: 24 September 2021 (aged 79) Paris, France
- Party: Socialist Party
- Education: École Polytechnique

Paul Quilès (French pronunciation: [pɔl kilɛs], 27 January 1942 – 24 September 2021) was a French Socialist politician.

== Biography ==
Quilès was born in Sig, Algeria on 27 January 1942.

Quilès was a member of the National Assembly for Paris and later Tarn département. He close to Laurent Fabius, and served as Defense Minister from 1985 to 1986, after the Rainbow Warrior scandal. He was Interior Minister from 1992 to 1993, then chairman of the Defense commission in the French National Assembly from 1997 to 2002.

Quilès died on 24 September 2021 at the age of 79.

Political offices
Preceded by Charles Hernu	Minister of Defense; 1985–1986	Succeeded by André Giraud
Preceded by Philippe Marchand	Minister of the Interior; 1992–1993	Succeeded by Charles Pasqua
