= Pierre Joxe =

French politician (born 1934)

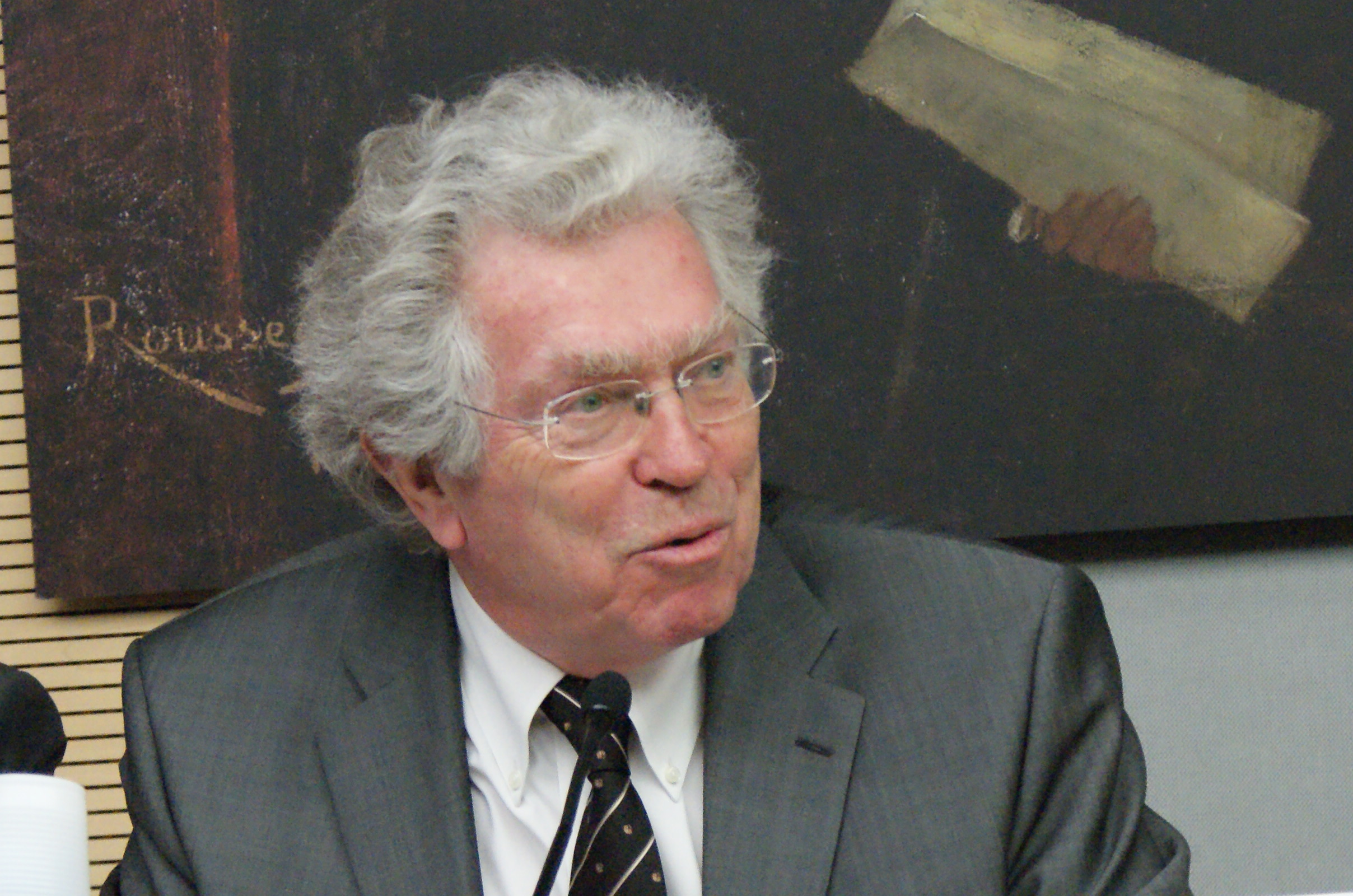

Member of the Constitutional Council
- In office 12 March 2001 – 12 March 2010
- Appointed by: Raymond Forni
- President: Yves Guéna; Pierre Mazeaud; Jean-Louis Debré
- Preceded by: Noëlle Lenoir
- Succeeded by: Jacques Barrot

First President of the Court of Audit
- In office 13 March 1993 – 12 March 2001
- Preceded by: Pierre Arpaillange
- Succeeded by: François Logerot

Minister of the Interior
- In office 12 May 1988 – 29 January 1991
- Prime Minister: Michel Rocard
- Preceded by: Charles Pasqua
- Succeeded by: Philippe Marchand
- In office 19 July 1984 – 20 March 1986
- Prime Minister: Laurent Fabius
- Preceded by: Gaston Defferre
- Succeeded by: Charles Pasqua

Personal details
- Born: Pierre Daniel Joxe; 28 November 1934 (age 91) 1st arrondissement of Paris, France
- Party: Convention of Republican Institutions (until 1971); Socialist Party (1971–present)
- Children: 2
- Parent: Louis Joxe
- Education: Sciences Po; London School of Economics; École nationale d'administration

Pierre Daniel Joxe (French: [pjɛʁ ʒɔks]; born 28 November 1934) is a French retired Socialist politician who most recently served on the Constitutional Council from 2001 to 2010.

A graduate of the École nationale d'administration, he joined the Court of Audit of France in the 1960s. Whereas his father, Louis Joxe, was Justice Minister of Charles de Gaulle, Pierre Joxe entered politics as a follower of François Mitterrand, first in the Convention of Republican Institutions, then (from 1971) in the renewed Socialist Party (PS). Considered one of the closest allies of the PS leader, he was elected as a deputy for the Saône-et-Loire département in 1973. He presided over the regional council of Burgundy from 1979 to 1982.

In 1981, when Mitterrand was elected President of France, Joxe became Minister of Industry for only one month, before he became leader of the Socialist group in the French National Assembly. Then, he joined the cabinet as Interior Minister from 1984 to the Socialist defeat in the 1986 legislative election. Re-appointed leader of the PS parliamentary group again, he became the Interior Minister after Mitterrand had won a second presidential term in 1988. He was the author of a new law code for Corsica. In 1991, during the Gulf War, he served as Defense Minister.

During March 1993, Joxe gave up politics to lead the Court of Audit of France. Then, he was nominated to the Constitutional Council (2001–2010). He has two sons, Benoît Joxe and Baptiste Joxe, both from his third marriage.

== Political career ==
First President of the Court of Audit : 1993–2001 (Resignation).

Member of the Constitutional Council of France : 2001–2010.

Governmental functions

Minister of Defence : 1991–1993.

Minister of Interior : 1988–1991.

Minister of Interior and Decentralization : 1984–1986.

Minister of Industry : May–June 1981.

Electoral mandates

National Assembly of France

President of the Socialist Party Group in the National Assembly : 1981–1984 (Became minister in 1984) / 1986–1988. Elected in 1981, reelected in 1986.

Member of the National Assembly of France for Saône-et-Loire : 1973–1981 (Became minister in 1981) / 1981–1984 (Became minister in 1984) / 1986–1988 (Became minister in 1988). Elected in 1978, reelected in 1978, 1981, 1986, 1988.

Regional Council

President of the Regional Council of Burgundy : 1979–1982.

Regional councillor of Ile-de-France : 1992–1993 (Resignation).

General Council

General councillor of Saône-et-Loire : 1973–1979.

Municipal Council

Deputy-mayor of Chalon-sur-Saône : 1977–1983.

Municipal councillor of Chalon-sur-Saône : 1977–1983.

Councillor of Paris : 1989–1993 (Resignation).

Political offices
Preceded by Gaston Defferre	Minister of the Interior; 1984–1986	Succeeded by Charles Pasqua
Preceded by Charles Pasqua	Minister of the Interior; 1988–1991	Succeeded by Philippe Marchand
Preceded by Jean-Pierre Chevènement	Minister of Defense; 1991–1993	Succeeded by Pierre Bérégovoy
Civic offices
Preceded by Pierre Arpaillange	First President of the Court of Audit; 1993–2001	Succeeded by François Logerot
Legal offices
Preceded by Noëlle Lenoir	Member of the Constitutional Council; 2001–2010	Succeeded by Jacques Barrot
