= Pierre Mauroy =

Prime Minister of France from 1981 to 1984

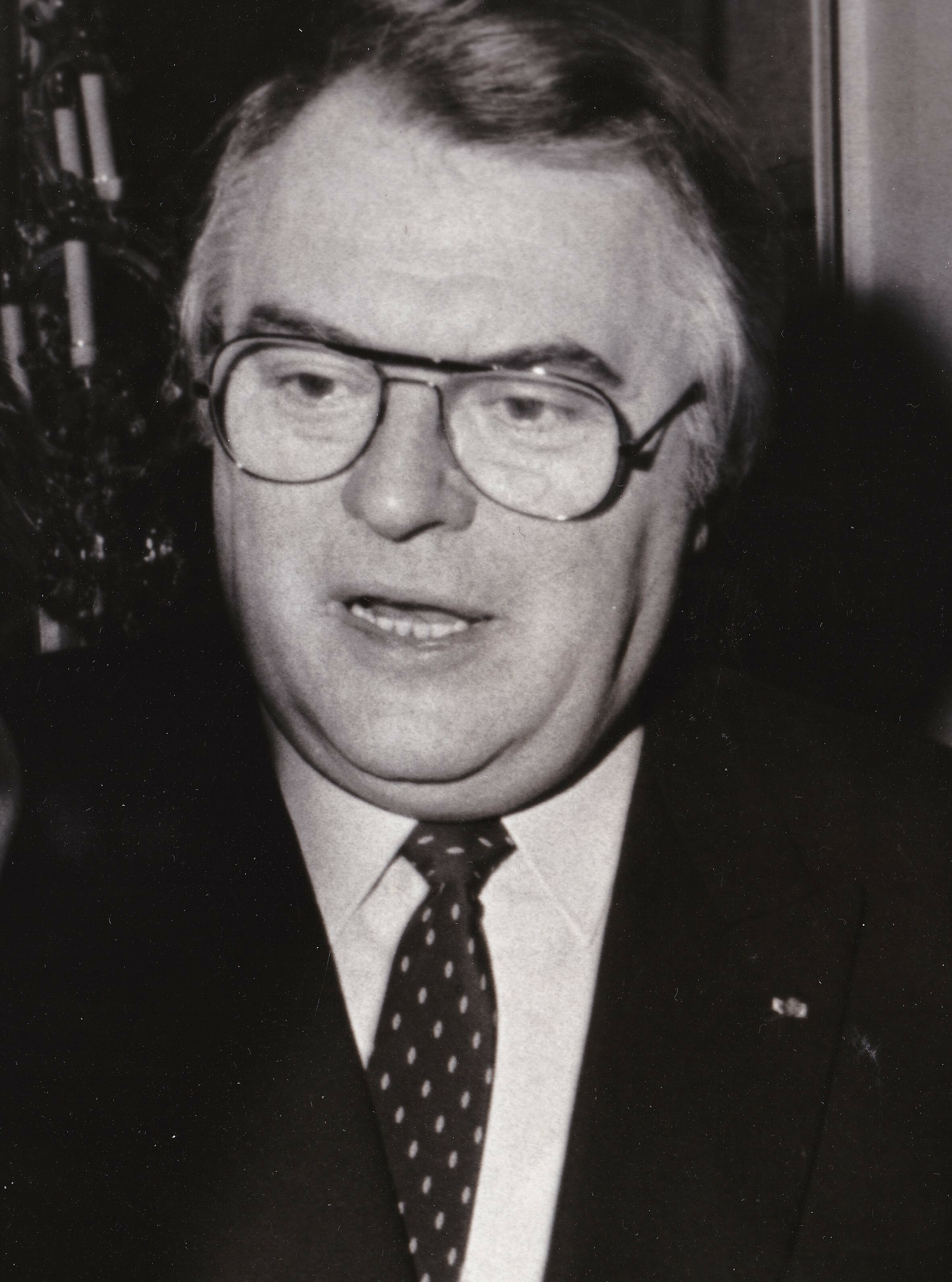
- Mauroy in 1982

Prime Minister of France
- In office 21 May 1981 – 17 July 1984
- President: François Mitterrand
- Preceded by: Raymond Barre
- Succeeded by: Laurent Fabius

President of the Socialist International
- In office 17 September 1992 – 10 November 1999
- Preceded by: Willy Brandt
- Succeeded by: António Guterres

First Secretary of the Socialist Party
- In office 14 May 1988 – 9 January 1992
- Preceded by: Lionel Jospin
- Succeeded by: Laurent Fabius

Mayor of Lille
- In office 8 January 1973 – 25 March 2001
- Preceded by: Augustin Laurent
- Succeeded by: Martine Aubry

Member of the French Senate for Nord
- In office 2 October 1992 – 30 September 2011

Personal details
- Born: 5 July 1928 Cartignies, Nord, France
- Died: 7 June 2013 (aged 84) Clamart, France
- Party: Socialist Party
- Occupation: Teacher

Pierre Mauroy (French: [pjɛʁ moʁwa]; 5 July 1928 – 7 June 2013) was a French politician who was Prime Minister of France from 1981 to 1984 under President François Mitterrand. Mauroy also served as Mayor of Lille from 1973 to 2001 and President of the Socialist International from 1992 to 1999. At the time of his death, Mauroy was the emeritus mayor of the city of Lille.

== Biography ==
=== Background ===
Mauroy was born in Cartignies. The son of a schoolteacher, Mauroy became a technical education teacher in Colombes and in 1955 was elected general secretary of the Union of Technical Education Colleges within the National Education Federation. He also led the Socialist Youth Movement and became a leading figure in the Socialist federation of Nord département, which was among the third biggest of the French Section of the Workers' International (SFIO) party and climbed quickly in the party. In 1966, he became the second most powerful person of the party behind the secretary general, Guy Mollet. Nevertheless, when Mollet resigned as leader in 1969, Alain Savary was chosen to succeed him.

Mauroy also led an important national association of youth clubs and was a trades unionist. From a working-class background, Mauroy represented (according to one observer) "the old working-class bastions of the north."

=== Political career ===
After the electoral disasters of 1968 and 1969, he was persuaded of the necessity to renew the party. In 1971, during the Epinay Congress, he supported François Mitterrand's election to the party leadership and became the second most powerful person in the Socialist Party (PS). Two years later, he was elected as a deputy and Mayor of Lille.

Increasingly, Mauroy criticized the replacement of former SFIO members from important positions by allies of Mitterrand. In this, he formed an alliance with Michel Rocard, the main opponent of Mitterrand, during the 1979 Metz Congress. However, Mitterrand chose him as spokesperson during the 1981 presidential campaign; after Mitterrand's election, he appointed Mauroy as Prime Minister.

Within the PS, Mauroy was associated with a group that, according to one study, “tended toward standard social democracy – friendly to Rocard’s economic liberalism, but committed to traditional socialist goals.”

=== Prime minister ===
Mauroy's government was a radical reforming one, implementing a wide range of social reforms including the reduction of the legal workweek from 40 to 39 hours, the lowering of the retirement age to 60, and higher social welfare benefits.

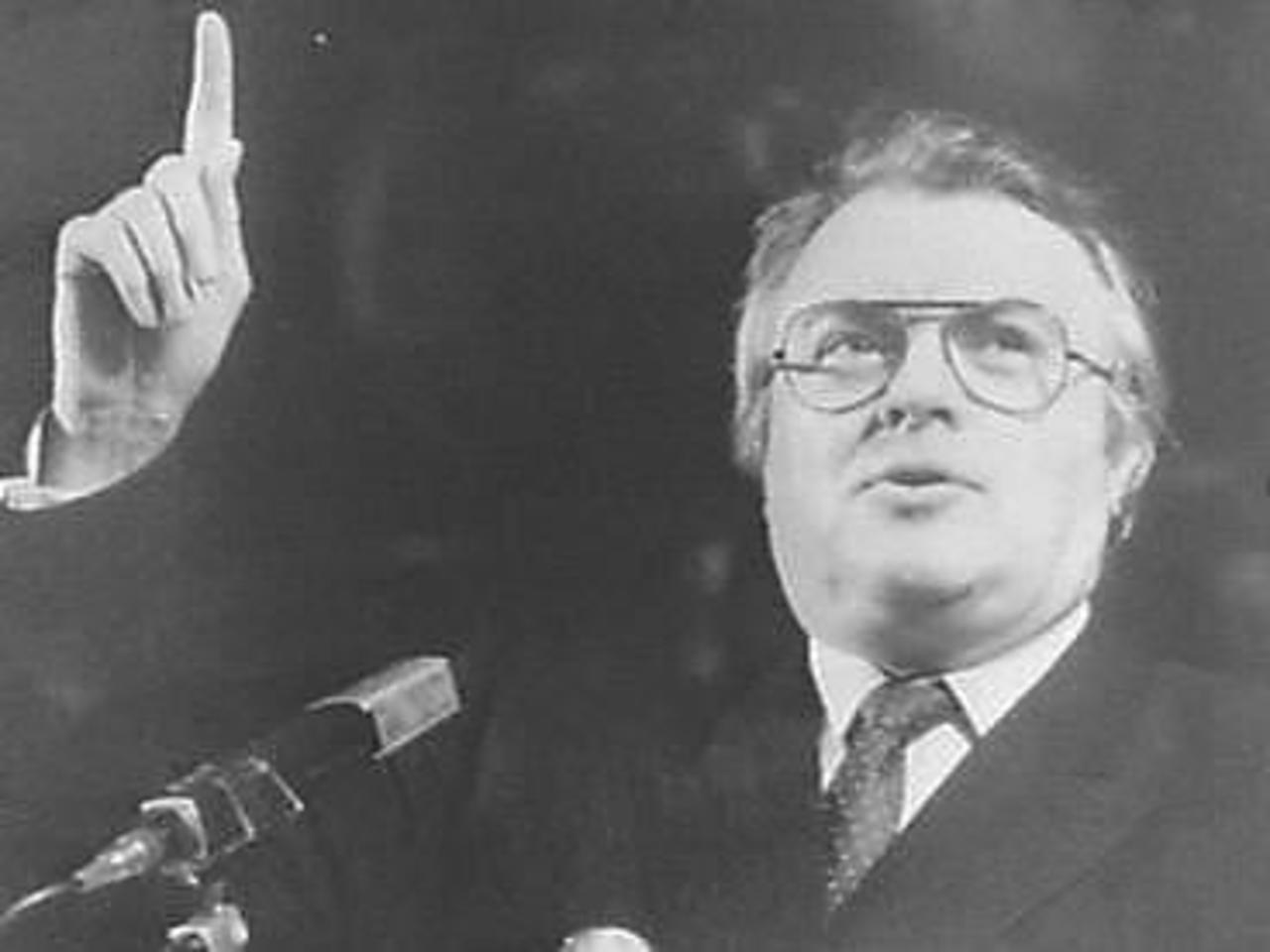
Mauroy in 1981

Various measures aimed at supporting farmers and extending eligibility for early retirement were introduced while Educational Priority Zones were set up to provide (as noted by one study) “additional resources to schools in depressed areas.”

The availability of health insurance benefits was improved for the unemployed and for those working part-time, 1 million households aged 60 and above not subject to income tax were exempted from both the T.V. license fee and property tax, and local taxation was removed for 1.5 million old seniors. New rights for immigrants were introduced, and a special entry pathway for those who had held union or political office was set up as a means of increasing access to the ENA; an elite political academy. Capital punishment was also brought to an end, along with high security wings in prisons and a state security court. Homebuilding was encouraged, and the maximum duration of unemployment insurance was extended.

The Deferre Law of 1982 introduced directly elected regional councils. while the Quillot Law of 1982 improved the rights of tenants and the Auroux Laws of 1982 introduced new rights in the workplace. A 1982 transportation law stipulated (as noted by one study) “that the government needs to provide reasonably priced public transport for all citizens.” Also in 1982, the law that governed the age of consent for homosexual activity was reduced from 18 to 15 (as noted by one study) “to match the age of consent for heterosexual activity.” Another law passed in 1982 allowed for the spouses of shopkeepers and artisans (as noted by one study) “to acquire social or work-related entitlements as co-workers, employees or associates.” In 1983 a new minimum contributory pension was introduced, while unemployment compensation was expanded (as noted by one study) “to include workers who had resigned from their jobs.” Also in 1983, the right to deduct child care costs was extended to all children under the age of three, the Loi Roudy provided for equal gender opportunities at work, and a project was introduced for funding economic and social measures in certain housing estates. An Act of January 1984 extended rights to parental leave, and a law of February 1984 encouraged vocational training.

During its first year in office, the Mauroy Government pursued an expansionary economic strategy known as “reflation in one country” which included measures such as the creation of several new posts in the public sector and increases in numerous social benefits. The government’s strategy, however, led to rises in both inflation and the budget deficit, and from 1982 onwards austerity measures were carried out such as the introduction of daily hospital bed charges and cuts to unemployment benefits, housing allowances, early retirement guarantees, and a number of medical reimbursements. Despite this, many increases made to social protection stayed intact. In addition, according to one study, the percentage of the population living in ‘absolute’ poverty continued to fall until 1984; a trend that had started back in 1979.

Failing to restrict the financing of private schools via the Savary Law, he resigned in 1984.

=== After Matignon ===
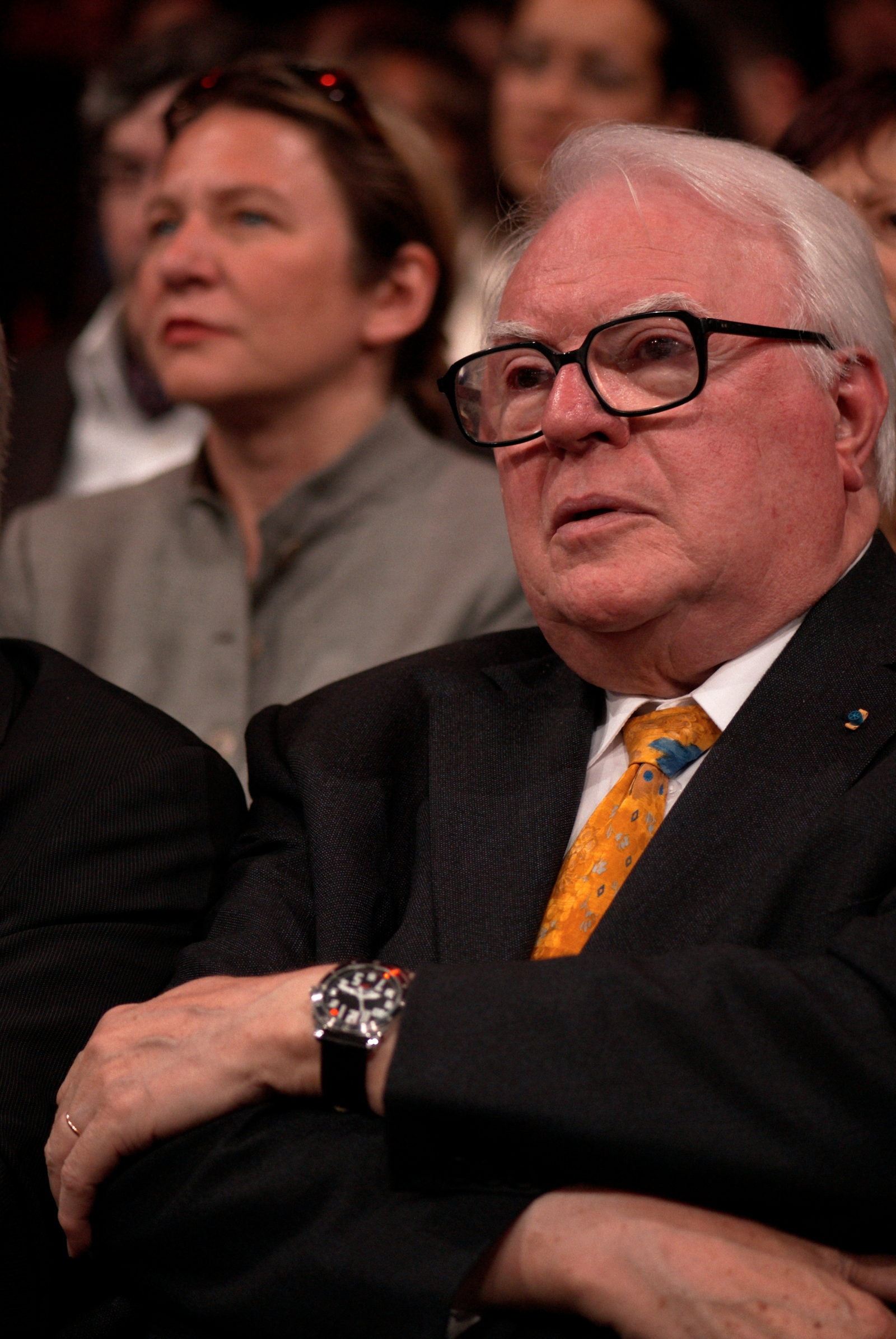
Pierre Mauroy in 2007.

In 1988 he became First Secretary of the PS against the will of Mitterrand, who supported Laurent Fabius. The following year, Mauroy called for (as noted by one study) “an “ideological” party congress to reformulate Socialist ideas." Until the end of his term, in 1992, he tried to appease the relations between the factions which composed the PS, notably during the very strained 1990 Rennes Congress. He allied with the rocardien group and Lionel Jospin's supporters, who came from the mitterrandist group.

President of the Socialist International from 1992 to 1999, Senator since 1992, he left the Lille mayoralty in 2001. He later supported the candidacy of Ségolène Royal during the 2007 presidential election and Martine Aubry during the 2011 socialist primary.

From 1955 to 2013, Mauroy was a member of the governing bodies of the Northern Federation and the national bureau. In 1992, Mauroy established the Fondation Jean-Jaurès; a political organization that he would serve as the president of for the rest of his life.

Mauroy died from complications of lung cancer on 7 June 2013 at the age of 84.

== Political career ==
Governmental functions

Prime minister : 1981–1984.

Electoral mandates

European Parliament

Member of European Parliament : 1979–1980 (Resignation).

National Assembly of France

Member of the National Assembly of France for Nord (French department) (2nd, then 1st constituency from 1988 to 1992) : 1973–1981 (Became Prime minister in 1981) / 1984–1992 (Elected senator in 1992). Elected in 1973, reelected in 1978, 1981, 1984, 1986, 1988.

Senate of France

Senator of Nord (French department) : 1992–2011. Elected in 1992, reelected in 2001.

Regional Council

President of the Regional Council of Nord-Pas-de-Calais : 1974–1981.

Regional councillor of Nord-Pas-de-Calais : 1974–1981 / 1986–1988 (Resignation).

General Council

Vice-president of the General Council of Nord (French department) : 1967–1973.

General councillor of Nord (French department) : 1967–1973.

Municipal Council

Mayor of Lille : 1973–2001. Reelected in 1977, 1983, 1989, 1995.

Deputy-mayor of Lille : 1971–1973.

Municipal councillor of Lille : 1971–2008. Reelected in 1977, 1983, 1989, 1995, 2001.

Urban community Council

President of the Urban Community of Lille Métropole : 1989–2008. Reelected in 1995, 2001.

Vice-president of the Urban Community of Lille Métropole : 1971–1989. Reelected in 1977, 1983.

Member of the Urban Community of Lille Métropole : 1971–2008. Reelected in 1977, 1983, 1989, 1995, 2001.

Political function

First Secretary (leader) of the Socialist Party (France) : 1988–1992. Elected in 1988.

== Mauroy's First Government, 21 May 1981 – 23 June 1981 ==
- Pierre Mauroy – Prime Minister
- Claude Cheysson – Minister of External Relations
- Charles Hernu – Minister of Defense
- Gaston Defferre – Minister of the Interior and Decentralization
- Jacques Delors – Minister of Economy
- Pierre Joxe – Minister of Industry
- Jean Auroux – Minister of Labour
- Maurice Faure – Minister of Justice
- Alain Savary – Minister of National Education
- Jean Laurain – Minister of Veterans
- Jack Lang – Minister of Culture
- Édith Cresson – Minister of Agriculture
- Michel Crépeau – Minister of Environment
- André Henry – Minister of Free Time
- Louis Mermaz – Minister of Transport and Equipment
- Edmond Hervé – Minister of Health
- Roger Quilliot – Minister of Housing
- Georges Fillioud – Minister of Communication
- Louis Mexandeau – Minister of Posts
- Michel Rocard – Minister of Planning and Regional Planning
- André Delelis – Minister of Commerce and Craft Industry
- Michel Jobert – Minister of External Commerce
- Jean-Pierre Chevènement – Minister of Research and Technology
- Nicole Questiaux – Minister of National Solidarity
- Louis Le Pensec – Minister of the Sea

== Mauroy's Second Government, 23 June 1981 – 22 March 1983 ==
- Pierre Mauroy – Prime Minister
- Claude Cheysson – Minister of External Relations
- Charles Hernu – Minister of Defense
- Gaston Defferre – Minister of the Interior and Decentralization
- Jacques Delors – Minister of Economy
- Catherine Lalumière – Minister of Consumption
- Pierre Dreyfus – Minister of Industry
- Jean Auroux – Minister of Labour
- Marcel Rigout – Minister of Vocational Training
- Robert Badinter – Minister of Justice
- Alain Savary – Minister of National Education
- Jean Laurain – Minister of Veterans
- Jack Lang – Minister of Culture
- Édith Cresson – Minister of Agriculture
- Michel Crépeau – Minister of Environment
- André Henry – Minister of Free Time
- Charles Fiterman – Minister of Transport
- Jack Ralite – Minister of Health
- Roger Quilliot – Minister of Town Planning and Housing
- Georges Fillioud – Minister of Communication
- Louis Mexandeau – Minister of Posts
- Michel Rocard – Minister of Planning and Regional Planning
- André Delelis – Minister of Commerce and Craft Industry
- Michel Jobert – Minister of External Commerce
- Jean-Pierre Chevènement – Minister of Research and Technology
- Nicole Questiaux – Minister of National Solidarity
- Louis Le Pensec – Minister of the Sea

Changes

- 29 June 1982 – Jean-Pierre Chevènement succeeds Dreyfus as Minister of Industry. Pierre Bérégovoy succeeds Questiaux as Minister of National Solidarity, becoming also Minister of Social Affairs.

== Mauroy's Third Government, 22 March 1983 – 17 July 1984 ==
- Pierre Mauroy – Prime Minister
- Claude Cheysson – Minister of External Relations
- Charles Hernu – Minister of Defense
- Gaston Defferre – Minister of the Interior and Decentralization
- Jacques Delors – Minister of Economy, Finance, and Budget
- Laurent Fabius – Minister of Industry and Research
- Marcel Rigout – Minister of Vocational Training
- Robert Badinter – Minister of Justice
- Alain Savary – Minister of National Education
- Michel Rocard – Minister of Agriculture
- Charles Fiterman – Minister of Transport
- Roger Quilliot – Minister of Town Planning and Housing
- Édith Cresson – Minister of Tourism and External Commerce
- Michel Crépeau – Minister of Commerce and Craft Industry
- Pierre Bérégovoy – Minister of Social Affairs and National Solidarity

Changes

- 4 October 1983 – Paul Quilès succeeds Quiliot as Minister of Town Planning and Housing.
- 18 December 1983 – Roland Dumas enters the Cabinet as Minister of European Affairs.

Political offices
Preceded by Augustin Laurent	Mayor of Lille; 1973–2001	Succeeded by Martine Aubry
Preceded by Raymond Barre	Prime Minister of France; 1981–1984	Succeeded by Laurent Fabius
Party political offices
Preceded by Lionel Jospin	First Secretary of the Socialist Party; 1988–1991	Succeeded by Laurent Fabius
Preceded by Willy Brandt	President of the Socialist International; 1992–1999	Succeeded by António Guterres
