= Bourg-en-Bresse Congress =

The Bourg-en-Bresse Congress was the tenth national congress of the French Socialist Party (Parti socialiste or PS). It took place from 28 to 30 October 1983.

== Results ==
Popular vote
Jospin-Mauroy-Rocard	77.20%
CÉRÉS	18.11%
Rocardian dissident	4.69%

Lionel Jospin was re-elected as First Secretary.
