= Jean-Michel Rosenfeld =

French Holocaust survivor and politician (1934–2023)

First Deputy Mayor of the 20th arrondissement of Paris
- In office 1984–2008

Member of the Municipal Council of Limeil-Brévannes
- In office 1971–1989

Member of the Municipal Council of Bonneuil-sur-Marne

Personal details
- Born: 5 March 1934 4th arrondissement of Paris, France
- Died: 4 March 2023 (aged 88)
- Party: SFIO; PS

Jean-Michel Rosenfeld (5 March 1934 – 4 March 2023) was a French Holocaust survivor and politician.

== Biography ==
=== Family and early life ===
Rosenfeld was born in Paris on 5 March 1934 to a Jewish family of Polish origin. His paternal family was originally from Lublin from where his grandparents, Moïse Rosenfeld and Etha Ejzenfarb, moved to France in 1907. Moïse and Etha had two children: Joseph, his father, and his aunt, Simone. His maternal grandmother, Suzanne Graif, was the daughter of a Romanian Jew and an Alsatian Jew. She married Paris Berek Altman in 1906 and gave birth to Rosenfeld's mother, Jacqueline, in 1906.

Rosenfeld's parents married in the 10th arrondissement of Paris on 6 June 1933. He was born in the 4th arrondissement. He left school after his primary education and became a draper's clerk in The Marais at the age of 16.

=== The Holocaust ===
Rosenfeld gave his testimony on the Holocaust in 2015 to American journalist Elaine Sciolino. For his entire life after the Holocaust, he still carried the yellow badge he was forced to wear in his wallet.

In 1939, Rosenfeld's father was taken as a prisoner of war and did not return home until 1945. Therefore, he lived in Paris with his mother during the German occupation and the Liberation of Paris. They were forced to wear the yellow badge from 1942 to 1944. He notably survived the Vel' d'Hiv Roundup on 16 July 1942, hidden with his mother by her boss.

Rosenfeld's father was a soldier of the 21st Marine Infantry Regiment, interned in Charmes, Vosges. He escaped execution by claiming he was not a Jew and instead sent to stalags in Austria, Italy, and Yugoslavia. He returned to Paris on 6 June 1945, having lost a third of his weight, as well as his teeth.

In total, Rosenfeld lost 38 family members in the Holocaust.

=== In politics ===
Rosenfeld joined the French Section of the Workers' International (SFIO) at the end of the 1960s. He became a municipal councillor in Bonneuil-sur-Marne before serving the same position in Limeil-Brévannes from 1971 to 1989. After the Metz Congress, he joined the team of Pierre Mauroy, placed in charge of external relations. He was then chargé de mission for press, communications, and external relations for Mauroy while the latter was Prime Minister. He led communications with various communities and organizations, such as Jews, Armenians, North Africans, the International League Against Racism and Anti-Semitism, MRAP, and Amnesty International. Rosenfeld worked alongside Mauroy for 40 years and was present at his death. After Mauroy's death, he remarked "When he left, I almost closed his eyes".

Rosenfeld was chief of staff to Minister of Labour Michel Delebarre from 1984 to 1986 in the government of Laurent Fabius. He was First Deputy Mayor of the 20th arrondissement of Paris from 1984 to 2008. He also served as vice-president of the Cercle Bernard Lazare.

On 14 February 2004, Rosenfeld was the victim of an anti-Semitic verbal attack, having been called a "youpin" by activists from the National Front.

=== Death ===
Jean-Michel Rosenfeld died on 4 March 2023, one day shy of his 89th birthday.

== Decorations ==
- Officer of the Legion of Honour (2014)
- Officer of the Ordre des Arts et des Lettres

== Works ==
- Je poursuis le chemin (2001)
- Les lumières de l'espoir : l'espoir, l'étoile, le triangle et la rose (2007)
