= Grande Arche Congress =

The Grande Arche Congress was the fourteenth national congress of the French Socialist Party (Parti socialiste or PS). It took place from 13 to 15 December 1991. The Congress marked a return to calm after the chaotic Rennes Congress.

== Results ==
Popular vote
Majority Motion	100.00%

Laurent Fabius was elected as First Secretary.
