= André Delelis =

French politician

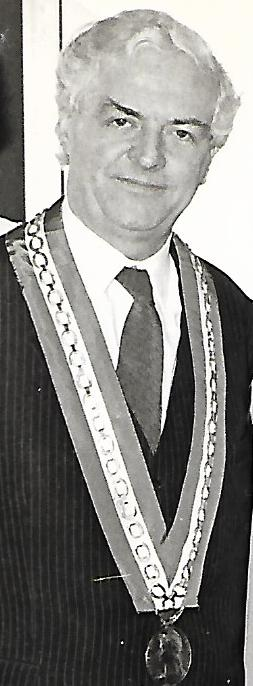

Mayor of Lens
- In office 1966–1998
- Preceded by: Ernest Schaffner
- Succeeded by: Guy Delcourt

Minister of Commerce and Craft Industry
- In office 1981–1983
- President: François Mitterrand
- Prime Minister: Pierre Mauroy
- Preceded by: Maurice Charretier
- Succeeded by: Michel Crépeau

Personal details
- Born: 23 May 1924 Cauchy-à-la-Tour, France
- Died: 4 September 2012 (aged 88) Lens, France
- Party: Socialist Party

André Delelis (23 May 1924 – 4 September 2012) was a French politician. He served as the Minister of Commerce and Craft Industry from 1981 to 1984, under President François Mitterrand.

== Biography ==
André Delelis in 1981

Delelis was born on 23 May 1924 in Cauchy-à-la-Tour, France. He was a Socialist member of the National Assembly of France from 14 June 1981 to 24 July 1981. He was a member of the French Senate from 1983 to 1992. From 1966 to 1998, he was the Mayor of Lens.
