= Metz Congress =

1979 meeting of the French Socialist Party

The Metz Congress was the seventh national congress of the French Socialist Party (Parti socialiste or PS) which took place on 6, 7 and 8 April 1979. The debate was influenced by the failure to update the Common Programme with the French Communist Party (Parti communiste français or PCF), and the unexpected defeat of the "Union of Left" at the 1978 legislative election.

Eight years after his establishing control of the party, François Mitterrand faced internal opposition. Michel Rocard, who joined the PS in 1974, led the right wing of the party. He criticized the Common Programme, and decried it as being "archaic" and "unrealistic". He advocated an alignment with contemporary European social-democracy and an acceptance of the market economy. For Mitterrand, these propositions threatened to split the "Union of Left".

Rocard was supported by Pierre Mauroy. He had been number 2 of the party since 1971. He represented the survivors of the French Section of the Workers' International (SFIO) who denounced the hegemony of Mitterrand's supporters in the party.

Jean-Pierre Chevènement and his left-wing CERES faction advocated a return to closer relations with the PCF.

Mitterrand's faction obtained 47% of the vote, Rocard's won 21.3%, Mauroy's scored 16% and Chevènement secured 14%. Mitterrand was re-elected first secretary thanks to the rallying of Chevènement. Mauroy lost the function of number 2 to Lionel Jospin. In spite of his popularity in the polls, Rocard promised he would not be a candidate at the next presidential election if Mitterrand announced his will to be the PS candidate.

== Results ==
Popular vote
Mitterrand	40.1%
Rocardian	20.4%
CÉRÉS	14.4%
Mauroy	13.6%
Defferre	7.7%
CÉRÉS dissident	3.2%
Feminists	0.3%

=== Runoff ===
Popular vote
Mitterrand-Defferre	46.97%
Rocardian	21.25%
Mauroy-CÉRÉS dissident	16.8%
CÉRÉS	14.98%

François Mitterrand was re-elected as First Secretary.
