= Rennes Congress =

The Rennes Congress was the thirteenth national congress of the French Socialist Party (Parti socialiste or PS). It took place from 15 to 18 March 1990.

In 1988, François Mitterrand was re-elected President of France but the PS obtained only a relative majority in the National Assembly. Elected with a moderate program (for a "united France"), Mitterrand chose his former rival Michel Rocard, leader of the right wing of the party, as prime minister. Furthermore, centrist politicians joined the cabinet.

Lionel Jospin, the party's first secretary since 1981, was appointed national education minister. Mitterrand wanted his former prime minister Laurent Fabius succeeded him to the head of the party. Fabius appeared as the heir chosen by Mitterrand. A coalition was created in order to prevent Fabius from being elected first secretary. It gathered Rocard's supporters and a part of the Mitterrandist faction led by Jospin, comprising those members with a background in the grassroots of the party and a long history of membership. Their candidate, Pierre Mauroy, another former prime minister, defeated Fabius.

During the Rennes Congress, Mitterrand wanted impose Fabius as first secretary. For a second time, he was opposed by a Rocard-Jospin alliance. The Rennes Congress was marked by the violence in the Mitterrandist group which split between Jospiniens and Fabiusiens, the later group being those "high fliers" who had joined the party relatively recently.

Other minority factions which presented proposals to the Congress were:

- Jean-Pierre Chevènement ("Socialism and Republic", formerly CERES) led the eurosceptic left-wing
- Julien Dray and Jean-Luc Mélenchon ("Socialist Left") were former trotskyists who criticized the "opening" to center-right politicians
- Marie-Noëlle Lienemann advocated an autogestionary project
- Jean Poperen ("To gather the Left") wanted to renew the alliance with the Communist Party.

== Results ==
Popular vote
Mauroy-Jospin-Mermaz	29.01%
Fabiusians	28.91%
Rocardians	24.31%
Chevènement Motion	8.54%
Poperénists Motion	7.22%
New Socialist School	1.35%
Lienemann	0.65%

== Consequences ==
Pierre Mauroy was re-elected First Secretary with the support of Jospin and Rocard. Mitterrand accused Jospin of being responsible for the split of the Mitterrandist current. His relations with Jospin and Rocard deteriorated until the "resignation" of Rocard from the head of the cabinet in 1991. The next year, Jospin was ejected from the government.

The violence of the debates gave a very bad public image to the PS and contributed to its decline at the beginning of the 1990s. The Rennes Congress is a traumatic event in the memory of the French Socialists.
