= Marcel Rigout =

French politician

Minister of Vocational Training
- In office 1981–1984
- President: François Mitterrand
- Prime Minister: Pierre Mauroy

Personal details
- Born: 10 May 1928 Verneuil-sur-Vienne, France
- Died: 23 August 2014 (aged 86) Limoges, France
- Party: French Communist Party

Marcel Rigout (10 May 1928 – 23 August 2014) was a French politician. He served as Minister of Vocational Training from 1981 to 1984, under former President François Mitterrand. From an early age, he was a member of the French Communist Party. To improve vocational skills, while serving as a government minister, Rigout helped to set up some 800 centres called either PAIO or missions locales between 1982 and 1984 where youngsters were provided with vocational guidance.

== Bibliography ==
- L'autre chance (1983)
