= Jean Laurain =

French politician

Jean Marie Laurain (1 January 1921 – 7 March 2008) was a French politician. He served as Minister of Veteran Affairs from 1981 to 1983, under former President François Mitterrand.

== Bibliography ==
- L'éducation populaire, ou la vraie révolution : l'expérience des maisons des jeunes et de la culture (1977)
- De l'ennui à la joie : éléments d'une pédagogie de la paix (1993)
- Metz ou la nostalgie du futur (1995)
- Brû, l'histoire de mon village (1998)
