= Jean-Pierre Chevènement =

French politician (born 1939)

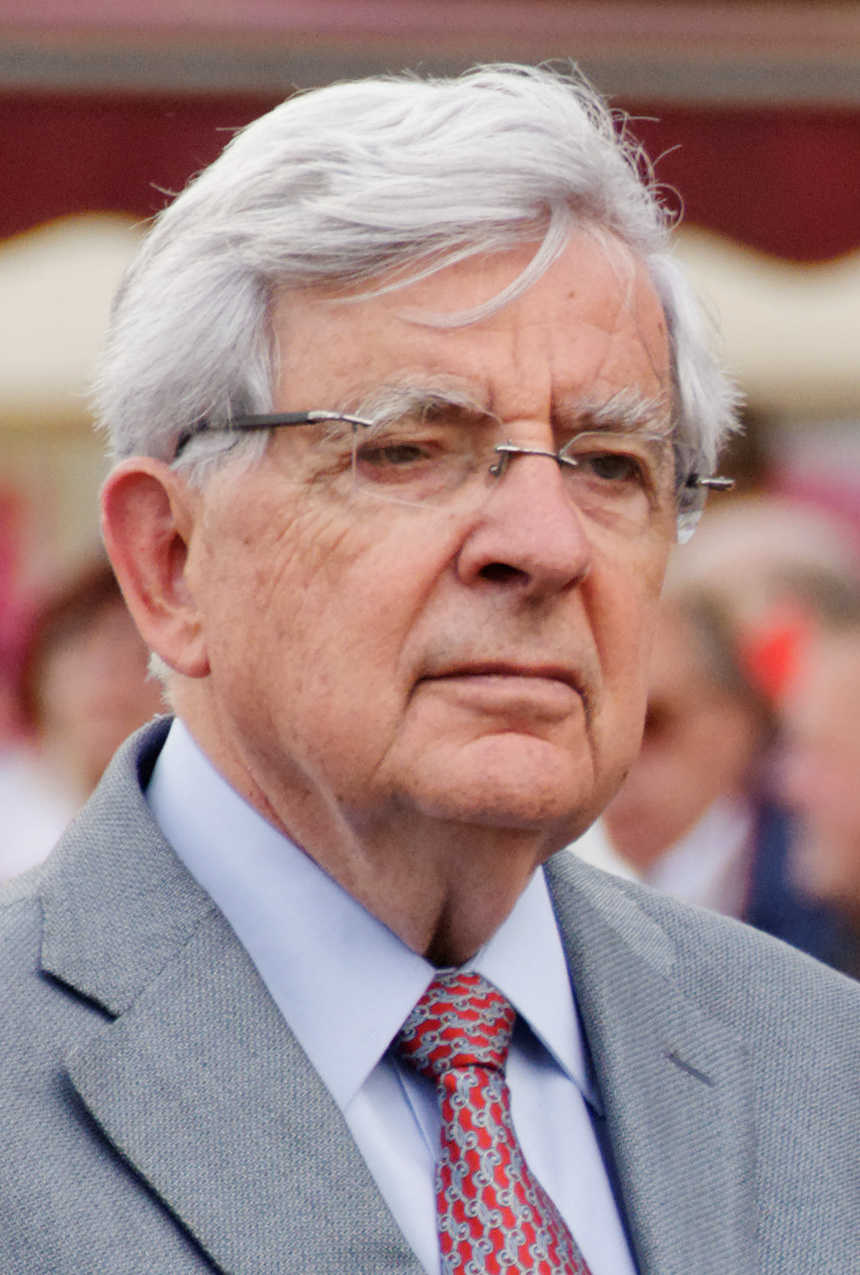

Minister of the Interior
- In office 4 June 1997 – 29 August 2000
- Prime Minister: Lionel Jospin
- Preceded by: Jean-Louis Debré
- Succeeded by: Daniel Vaillant

Minister of Defence
- In office 12 May 1988 – 29 January 1991
- Prime Minister: Michel Rocard
- Preceded by: André Giraud
- Succeeded by: Pierre Joxe

Minister of National Education
- In office 17 July 1984 – 20 March 1986
- Prime Minister: Laurent Fabius
- Preceded by: Alain Savary
- Succeeded by: René Monory

Minister of Research and Industry
- In office 22 May 1981 – 23 March 1983
- Prime Minister: Pierre Mauroy
- Preceded by: Pierre Aigrain
- Succeeded by: Laurent Fabius

Personal details
- Born: 9 March 1939 (age 87) Belfort, Territoire de Belfort
- Party: SFIO (1964–1969); PS (1969–1993); MDC (1993–2002); Republican Pole (2002–2003); MRC (2003–2015)
- Spouse: Nisa Chevènement
- Children: Raphaël and Jean-Christophe
- Education: Sciences Po; École nationale d'administration

Jean-Pierre Chevènement (French: [ʒɑ̃ pjɛʁ ʃəvɛnmɑ̃]; born 9 March 1939) is a French politician who served as a minister in the 1980s and 1990s best known for his candidacy in the 2002 French presidential election. After serving as mayor of Belfort, he was elected to the Senate for the Territoire de Belfort in 2008. As a cofounder of the Socialist Party (PS) and founder of the Citizen and Republican Movement (MRC), he is a significant figure of the French Left.

== Biography ==
=== Background ===
The Chevènement family is of Swiss origin, with their original name, Schwennemann, having been gallicized to Chevènement in the 18th century. He was born in Belfort near the Swiss border, speaks German, and studied in Vienna.

=== Beginning in politics ===
Chevènement's idiosyncratic left-wing nationalism has led to comparison with the late British politician Peter Shore. He describes his Eurosceptic and Gaullist position as "republican". He was Mayor of Belfort from 1983 to 2008 and was a Deputy in the National Assembly from 1973 to 2002.

He joined the French Section of the Workers' International (SFIO) and founded the Center for Socialist Studies, Research and Education (Centre d'études, de recherche et d'éducation socialistes or CERES). The organization constituted the left wing of the party, and promoted an alliance with the French Communist Party.

In 1969 the SFIO was superseded by the Socialist Party (Parti socialiste or PS). Two years later, CERES supported the takeover of the party by François Mitterrand. It played a major role in drawing up the Socialist plan for victory in the 1981 elections.

=== In governments ===
Chevènement was Minister of Research and Industry from 1981 to 1983, when he resigned, for the first of three times in his career. He disagreed with the change in economic policy made by President Mitterrand in order to stay in the European Monetary System. He has said that "a minister has to keep his mouth shut; if he wants to open it, he resigns". However, he returned to the cabinet as Minister of National Education from 1984 to 1986.

Appointed Minister of Defence in 1988, he served until 1991, when he resigned due to his opposition to Operation Desert Storm, which he believed had exceeded the mandate granted by Resolution 678. After this he opposed the Maastricht Treaty, an issue on which Mitterrand and the PS led the "yes" campaign. In 1993 he left the PS and founded a new political party: the Citizens' Movement (Mouvement des citoyens or MDC).

Chevènement and the MDC participated in the formation of the Plural Left coalition. When it won the 1997 legislative election he became Minister of the Interior in the government of Lionel Jospin. On 2 September 1998, Chevènement underwent surgery on his gall bladder. He then had a severe allergic reaction to the anesthetic, causing him to lapse into a coma for 8 days. He began to recover, leaving the hospital on 22 October, but he could not work in his ministry for another four months. As a result of this episode he gained the nickname "the miracle of the republic".

For the third time, Chevènement resigned from the government in 2000 because of his opposition to giving increased autonomy to Corsica and in order to prepare his candidacy to the 2002 presidential elections.

=== 2002 presidential election ===
He was a candidate at the 2002 presidential election. He put himself forward as the leader of the "republicans" against what he called the "Chirac/Jospin duo". He created the Republican Pole, for more left-wing nationalists. He won 5% of the vote. Many Socialists blamed Chevènement for the elimination of Lionel Jospin in the first round of the presidential race. Consequently, at the June 2002 legislative election, the PS invested a candidate against him in the Belfort constituency. In this, he was defeated by the Union for a Popular Movement (UMP) candidate and lost his parliamentary seat.

=== Citizen and Republican Movement ===
Finally, the Republican Pole split and Chevènement created the Citizen and Republican Movement (Mouvement républicain et citoyen or MRC), which described itself as a left-wing party. He reconciled with the PS when, after raising the possibility of a new presidential candidacy, he renounced this to support Ségolène Royal's candidacy in the 2007 presidential election. In spite of the PS support, he failed to retake his parliamentary seat at the 2007 legislative election. He announced that he would not stand as a candidate for another term as Mayor of Belfort.

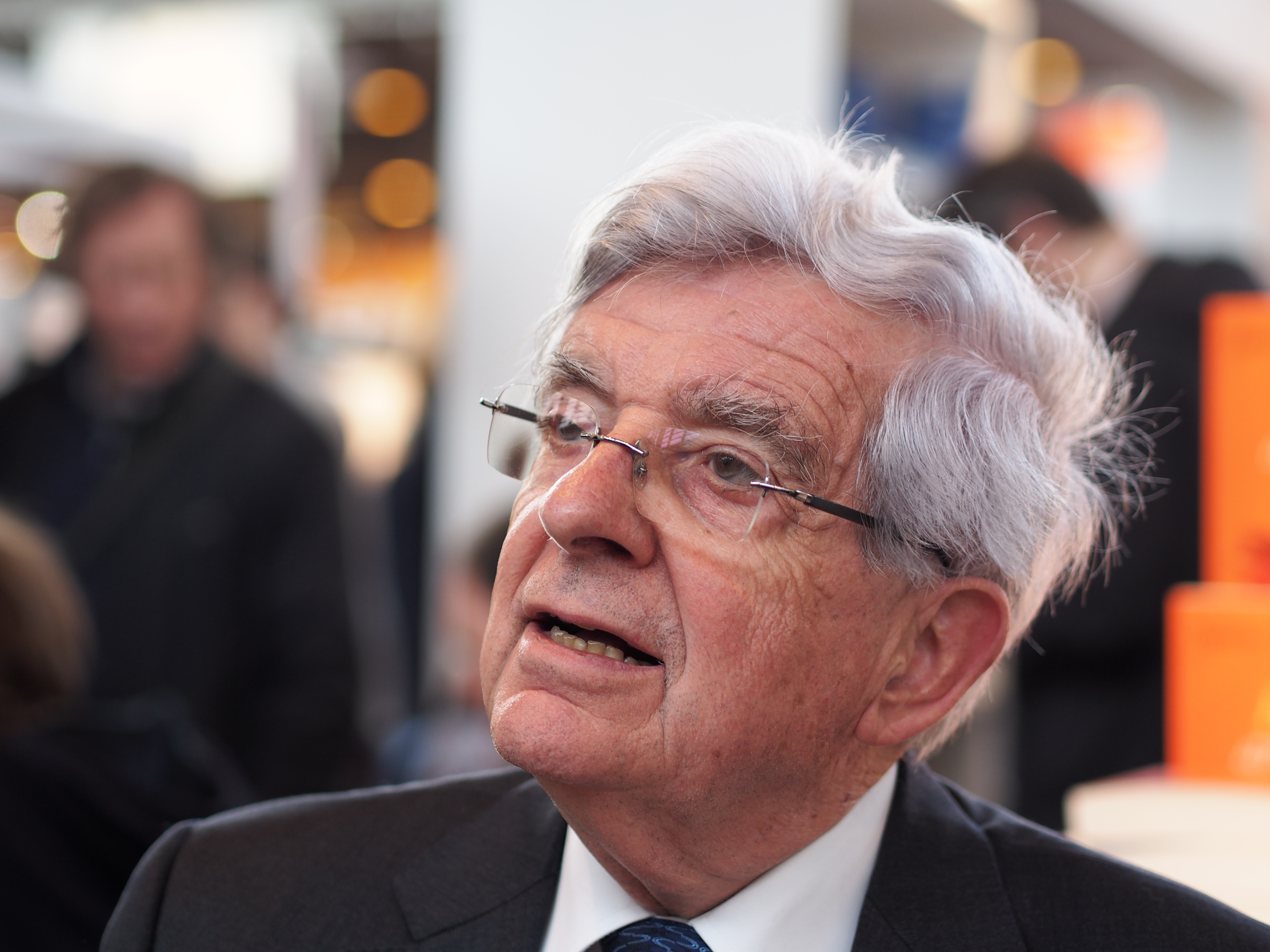
Jean-Pierre Chevènement at the Salon du livre in Paris, 23 March 2014.

In 2004 he established the Foundation "Res Publica", which aims to promote the 'republican model' (le modèle républicain) and to define a long-term political vision. Chevènement states, however, that Res Publica is not a political party.

In the Senate election held on 21 September 2008, Chevènement was elected as a Senator from the Territoire de Belfort, defeating his opponent, Socialist candidate Yves Ackerman. In June 2014, he announced that he will not stand at the 2014 Senate election.

He tried to be candidate for the presidential election of 2012.

== Political profile ==
Jean-Pierre Chevènement is a souverainist and patriotic left-wing politician, a kind of left-wing Gaullist. In consequence, he is opposed to European federalism because of a possible disappearance of nations and the creation of a non-democratic construction led by non-elected technocrats. He calls for a transformation of the single currency (Euro) into a common currency, allowing countries to adapt and control their economies, but also allowing EU to have a single voice in the world. He has criticized the effect the single currency has had on the economies of other European countries such as Greece, Italy, Spain and Portugal.

In office he defended the "French status" in NATO: i.e. outside the integrated military command. He opposed rejoining it in 2009.

He defends a strict separation of church and state in addition to his vision of a harmonious nation-state, being against communitarianism and for cultural assimilation.

== Political career ==
Governmental functions

- Minister of State Minister of Research and Technology: 1981–1982
- Minister of State, Minister of Industry Research: 1982–1983
- Minister of National Education: 1984–1986
- Minister of Defense: 1988–1991
- Minister of Interior: 1997–2000

Electoral mandates

National Assembly of France

Member of the National Assembly of France for Territoire de Belfort (1st then 2nd constituency from 1988 to 2002): 1973–1981 (Became minister in 1981) / 1986–1988 (Became minister in 1988) / 1991–1997 (Became minister in 1997) / 2000–2002. Elected in 1973, reelected in 1978, 1981, 1986, 1988, 1991, 1993, 1997, 2000.

Senate of France

Senator of Territoire de Belfort: Since 2008.

Regional Council

President of the Regional Council of Franche-Comté: 1981–1982.

Regional councillor of Franche-Comté: 1974–1988 (Resignation). Elected in 1986.

Municipal Council

Mayor of Belfort: 1983–1997 (Resignation) / 2001–2007 (Resignation). Reelected in 1989, 1995, 2001.

1st deputy-mayor of Belfort: 1977–1983 / 1997–2001. Reelected in 1997.

Municipal councillor of Belfort: 1977–2008. Reelected in 1983, 1989, 1995, 2001.

Agglomeration community Council

President of the Agglomeration community of Belfort: 1977–2008. Reelected in 1983, 1989, 1995, 2001.

Member of the Agglomeration community of Belfort: 1977–2008. Reelected in 1983, 1989, 1995, 2001.

Political functions

President of the Citizen and Republican Movement: Since 2008.

Political offices
Preceded by Alain Savary	Minister of Education; 1984–1986	Succeeded by René Monory
Preceded by André Giraud	Minister of Defence; 1988–1991	Succeeded by Pierre Joxe
Preceded by Jean-Louis Debré	Minister of the Interior; 1997–2000	Succeeded by Daniel Vaillant
