= Georges Fillioud =

French politician

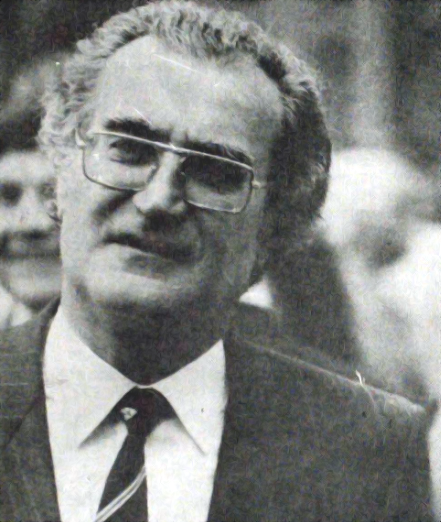

Georges Fillioud (7 July 1929 – 15 September 2011) was a French politician. He was a member of the French government in charge of mass media from 1981 to 1986, under former President François Mitterrand.

== Biography ==
Georges Filloud was born on 7 July 1929, in Lyon, France. In the 1960s, he worked for Europe 1. He served as Minister (or State Secretary) of Communication from 1981 to 1986. In this capacity, he made it possible for radio and television channels to be privately owned, leading to the creation of Canal +. From 1990 to 1994, he served as the Director of the Institut national de l'audiovisuel. He died on 15 September 2011.

== Bibliography ==
- Mémoires des deux rives : Entre médias et pouvoir (2008)
