= Charles Fiterman =

French politician (born 1933)

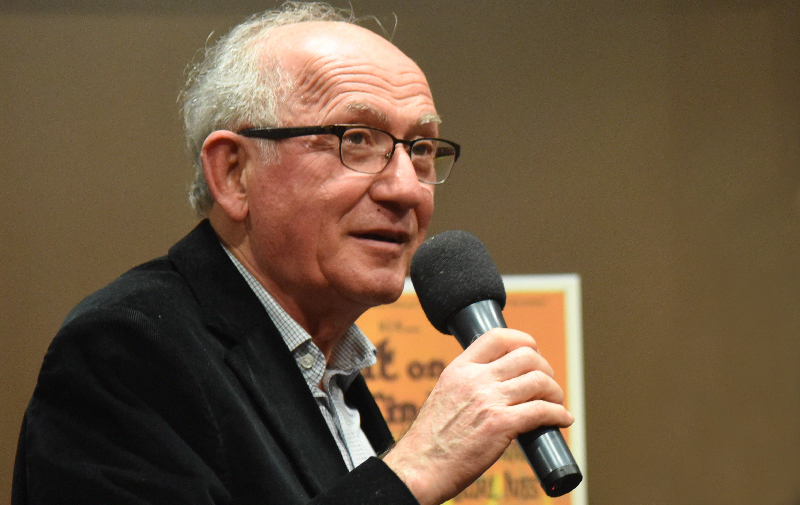
- Charles Fiterman in 2015
- Born: 28 December 1933 (age 92)
- Occupation: Politician

Charles Fiterman (born 28 December 1933) is a French politician. He served as Minister of Transport from 1981 to 1984, under former President François Mitterrand. He was originally a high-ranking member of the French Communist Party, but joined the Socialist Party in 1998. In 2017, he announced in Le Monde that he had left the Socialist Party.

== Bibliography ==
- Profession de foi: pour l'honneur de la politique (2005)
