= Laurent Fabius =

Prime Minister of France from 1984 to 1986

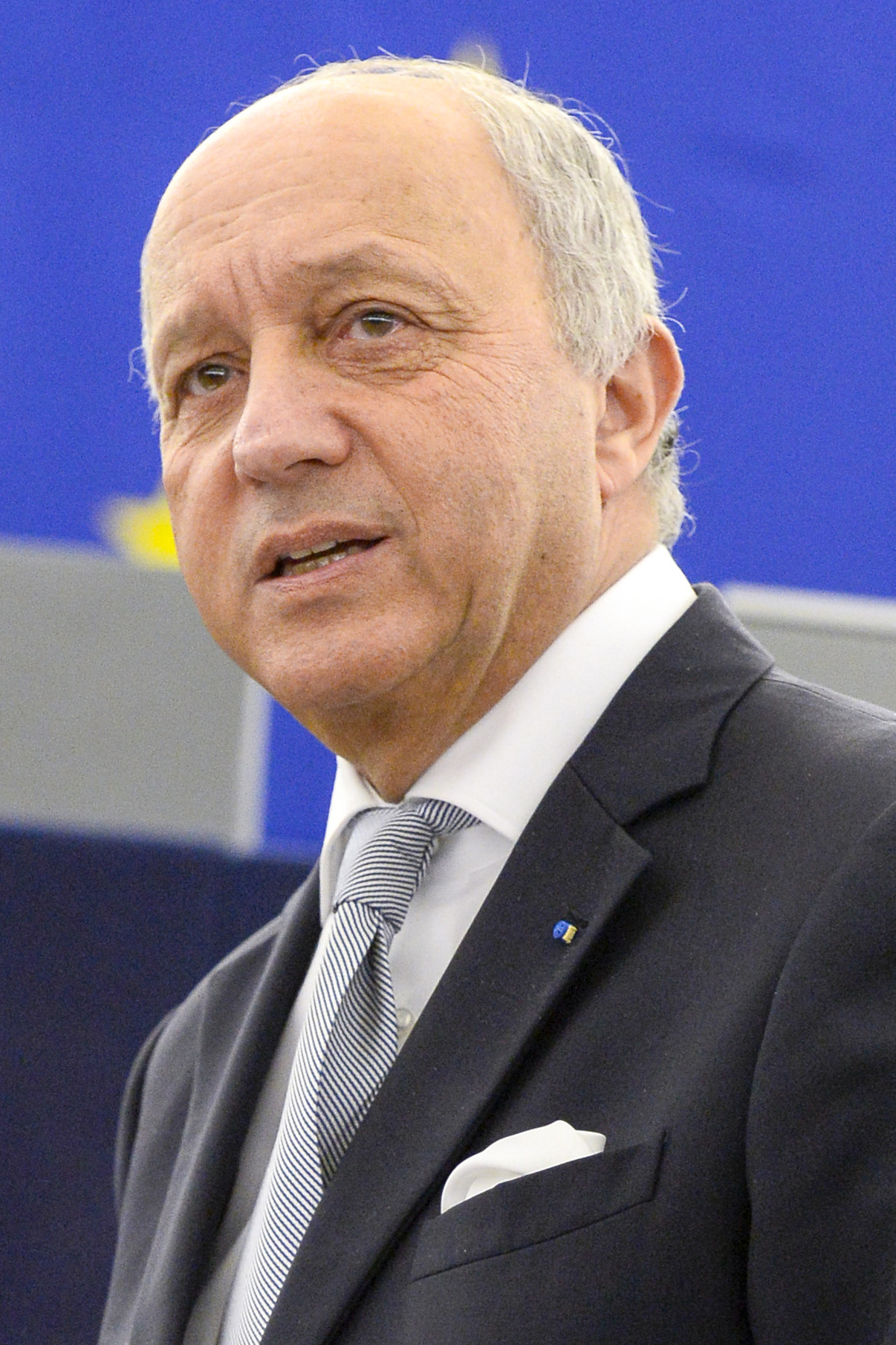
- Fabius in 2016

President of the Constitutional Council
- In office 8 March 2016 – 8 March 2025
- Appointed by: François Hollande
- Preceded by: Jean-Louis Debré
- Succeeded by: Richard Ferrand

Minister of Foreign Affairs and International Development
- In office 16 May 2012 – 11 February 2016
- Prime Minister: Jean-Marc Ayrault; Manuel Valls
- Preceded by: Alain Juppé
- Succeeded by: Jean-Marc Ayrault

Prime Minister of France
- In office 17 July 1984 – 20 March 1986
- President: François Mitterrand
- Preceded by: Pierre Mauroy
- Succeeded by: Jacques Chirac

Minister of the Economy, Finance and Industry
- In office 28 March 2000 – 7 May 2002
- Prime Minister: Lionel Jospin
- Preceded by: Christian Sautter
- Succeeded by: Francis Mer

President of the National Assembly
- In office 12 June 1997 – 28 March 2000
- Preceded by: Philippe Séguin
- Succeeded by: Raymond Forni
- In office 23 June 1988 – 22 January 1992
- Preceded by: Jacques Chaban-Delmas
- Succeeded by: Henri Emmanuelli

Minister of the Budget
- In office 22 May 1981 – 23 March 1983
- Prime Minister: Pierre Mauroy
- Preceded by: Maurice Papon
- Succeeded by: Henri Emmanuelli

Personal details
- Born: Laurent Pierre Emmanuel Fabius; 20 August 1946 (age 80) Paris, France
- Party: Socialist Party
- Spouse: Françoise Castro (m. 1981; div. 2002)
- Domestic partner: Marie-France Marchand-Baylet
- Children: 3
- Education: Lycée Janson-de-Sailly; Lycée Louis-le-Grand
- Alma mater: École Normale Supérieure; Sciences Po; École nationale d'administration

Laurent Pierre Emmanuel Fabius (French: [lɔʁɑ̃ fabjys]; born 20 August 1946) is a French politician who has served in a number of capacities, most recently as president of the Constitutional Council from 2016 to 2025. A member of the Socialist Party, he previously served as Prime Minister of France from 17 July 1984 to 20 March 1986. Fabius was 37 years old when he was appointed and is, after Gabriel Attal, the second youngest prime minister of the Fifth Republic.

Fabius was also President of the National Assembly from 1988 to 1992 and again from 1997 to 2000. Fabius served in the government as Minister of Finance from 2000 to 2002 and Minister of Foreign Affairs from 2012 to 2016.

== Early life ==
Fabius was born in the affluent 16th arrondissement of Paris, the son of Louise (née Strasburger-Mortimer; 1911–2010) and André Fabius (1908–1984). He is the younger brother of Catherine Leterrier and François Fabius. His parents were from Ashkenazi Jewish families who converted to Catholicism. Fabius was raised a Catholic; he has three sons, David (born 1978) with his partner Christine d'Izarny Gargas, Thomas (born 1981) and Victor (born 1983) with his spouse, Françoise Castro.

Fabius later attended the École normale supérieure, graduated from Sciences Po, and studied at the École nationale d'administration.

== Political career ==
After his studies, Fabius became an auditor for the Council of State. A member of the Socialist Party (PS) since 1974, Fabius was first elected to the National Assembly in 1978 for the fourth constituency of Seine-Maritime. Fabius quickly gained entry to the circle of François Mitterrand, the leader of the party.

=== In Government: 1981–1984 ===
When Mitterrand was elected as President of France in 1981, Fabius was nominated as Minister of the Budget. Two years later, Fabius became Minister of Industry, and pursued the policy of "industrial restructuring". In 1984, in a government shake-up, Mitterrand chose Fabius as prime minister (choosing Fabius over Pierre Bérégovoy and Jacques Delors). At the age of 37 he was the youngest French prime minister since 1819.

=== Prime Minister: 1984–1986 ===
Fabius advocated a new kind of French socialism, which accepted democracy. It marked a shift away from traditional socialist concerns with state ownership and instead looked for ways to modernize industry, and increase productivity, even at the cost of some jobs. Fabius also worked to modernize the party's archaic structures. In social policy, a law of December 1984 replaced allowance for orphans with a family support allowance, and empowered family allowance funds to aid in recovery of child support when a parent fails to pay. The allowable income for recipients of the young child allowance was increased (July 1984) for families with three or more children. The Fabius Government also sought to reduce penalties on families with working mothers by substantially increasing the income ceiling for dual-income families receiving the young child allowance. A parental education fund was created (1985), which provided for payments to each person who stops work or reduces hours of work as a result of the birth of any child beyond the first two, for which the parent(s) is/are responsible. In 1985, as a means of upholding the rights of homosexuals, the penal code was amended to prohibit discrimination on the grounds of "moral habits" which included sexual orientation, which also secured the right to same-sex relationships.

A decree of 17 July 1984 set up an Immigrants' Council, which could be consulted on questions of concern to the immigrant population regarding living conditions, housing, work, employment, education, and training, as well as social and cultural activities. In November 1984, an allowance was introduced if the parent concerned had been employed for two or more years. Known as the "allocation parentale d'education," this allowance provided 1,000 francs per month for parents who decided to take two years of parental leave after the birth of their first child. The "allocation au jeune enfant," introduced in January 1985, was paid to all families at a flat rate for each child from the third month of pregnancy for nine months, regardless of the parents' income. Payment was to continue after this period for 8 out of 10 families for a further 32 months on a means-tested basis. In effect, this created a benefit for the first child in lower income families. The government, however, reduced the daily maternity allowance from 90% to 84% of the basic wage, while the reimbursement rate of so-called "comfort" medicinal products was also lowered.

In June 1985, a law was passed allowing first offenders who had committed petty crimes to serve sentences of six months or less in public-service jobs. A July 1985 law tripled the amount of aid for victims of crimes. Legislation was introduced later that year to restrict the use of preventive detention, and ensure that the rights of suspects were better protected.

A decree of September 1984 reconstituted the Supreme Council for the Prevention of Occupational Risks, a consultative body representing both sides of industry, to make it function more flexibly, and was extended to include crafts. A law of January 1985 extended the scope for associations whose formal objectives include combating racism to institute a civil action where an offence has been committed against an individual by reason of his national or ethnic origin, race or religion. A special 1985 holiday programme was introduced, directed particularly at young people outside the traditional circuits of organised leisure activities. Provisions were also adopted that same year according new rights to families and users of child social assistance, particularly as regards information and the association of families and children in decision-making. The right to maternity leave was also extended to the father, in the event of the death of the mother in child-birth. The father was entitled to post-natal leave and could claim an allowance under the maternity insurance scheme.

In the field of education, much time and effort were spent on improving the system and educational outcomes. Vast sums were provided to improve technical education in schools, with closer ties established between education and industry, a programme was launched to train 25,000 teachers per annum in the use of computers, 100,000 computers were purchased for students to use, and 1 billion francs were provided for purchasing modern machine tools. The university system was reformed along practical, technological lines, with a degree in new technologies introduced, the reorientation of the first cycle to include greater emphasis on languages and new technologies, the provision of students with orientation and career opportunity meetings to help them plan their course of study in relation to the job market. Universities were encouraged to open up to industry and new technologies via training more skilled researchers and considering the practical needs of business. In 1985, a vocational baccalaureat was established. to provide training for highly skilled workers.

In employment policy, the Fabius Government introduced a number of measures designed to mitigate the effects of unemployment. In 1984, three youth training programmes were set up to ease the transition from school to work. The contrat de qualification (CQ) combined work and training for young workers during a 6-month to 2-year period. The contrat d'adaptation (CA) was aimed at facilitating the hiring of young workers by adapting existing skills to the work setting. Under this scheme, individuals worked for a maximum 6-month period while receiving at least 200 hours of training. The stages d'initiation a La vie professionnelle (SIVP) provided schoolleavers with an initiation into work life to enable them to sample and then choose a career. The pre-training stages lasted for three to six months, with the worker receiving at least twenty-five hours of training a month. Participation in this scheme could lead to a CQ or CA.

Under a law of August 1985 governing leave for training, retraining and reemployment, employers undertake to offer such leave to a specific number of wage-earners whose redundancy would have been authorised; during this period the workers concerned will be able to benefit from a number of activities organised to help them find new jobs. A law of January 1985 widened the scope of certain social provisions, including the encouragement of training work experience schemes for young people by setting up introductory apprenticeships and extending the fifth week of annual paid holiday to nursery school assistants. A law of July 1985, while increasing the number of cases in which a firm could use temporary workers and relaxing conditions regarding the duration of certain types of contracts, also introduced changes in the rules relating to the duration of probation periods and made it harder to re-employ temporary workers in the same job before a waiting period has expired, etc.

The way in which the occupational health services are organised was modified by two decrees issued in March 1986. The first established regional occupational health committees while the second made important changes to the regulations. A Decree of March 1986 laid down conditions for the approval of organisations conducting atmospheric monitoring and made a French standard on such work compulsory, while a Decree of March 1986 on the information and test results to be provided under the Labour Code introduced in France the European Community testing methods for analysing dangerous substances as well as the OECD "codes of practice" governing the procedures to be followed when conducting these tests.

During the early Eighties, the Socialists introduced the "congé de conversion" ("conversion leave"), which received widespread publicity in 1984 when redundancy measures were introduced for the shipbuilding and steel industries. These combined the traditional tool of early retirement for redundant workers over the age of fifty with a "conversion leave" for others. These leaves suspended (but did not break) the work contract for a period of up to two years, and during this time the individual received 70% of their previous wage together with retraining in a new occupation. After the retraining was over, workers were promised two job offers. In 1985, the Fabius Government universalised the congé. The revamped congé de conversion offered redundant workers 65% of their previous salary (in line with the benefits for early retirement and unemployment compensation) and a training period of 4–10 months. Between 1985 and 1987, however, only 15,000 workers had taken advantage of the congés, and only one-third succeeded in their "conversion." A year earlier, in 1984, the Fabius government established the travaux d'utilite collective (TUC) programme to prepare school leavers for professional life. This scheme offered unemployed youth between the ages of 16 and 21 (extended to 25 in 1985), the opportunity to work half time in a public sector job.

Improvements were also made to the system of benefits for the long-term unemployed whose rights to unemployment insurance had expired. Subject to certain conditions regarding previous activity and resources, the daily solidarity allowance paid to them was raised from FF 42 to FF.64.50 on 1 April. This could be as high as FF 86 per day for unemployed persons aged 55 and over who could give proof of 20 years' paid employment, while unemployed persons aged 57 1/2 had to give proof of only ten paid employment to obtain this allowance and are not required to look for a job. A law of July 1985 amended the articles of the Code de Travail (Labour Code) to bring them into line with EEC Directive 79/781/EEC on the classification, packaging and labelling of dangerous substances. A decree of January 1985 laid down a list of work for which the employees of temporary labour agencies may not be employed, the work in question involving exposure to certain toxic agents and special risks for temporary workers for whom it is difficult to provide medical supervision. A decree of April 1985 laid down technical instructions to be observed by occupational physicians responsible for medical checks on employees exposed to substances which may cause malignant damage to the bladder. The scope of a decree of October 1983, which laid down a list of and the conditions for the labelling and packaging of paints, varnishes, printing inks, adhesives and similar products was extended by a decree of July 1985 to include enamelling preparations. A circular of May 1985 on the prevention of occupational cancers specified the roles of the employer, the trade unions and the occupational physician in preventing this hazard, the effects of which may appear only long after exposure to the agents in question.

A law of January 1986 contained a number of changes regarding workers' right to express their views. The obligation to negotiate agreements on the way in which this right is exercised, which used to be limited to firms employing at least 200 workers, was extended to all businesses where trade unions had established one or more sections and appointed a shop steward. The obligation to negotiate did not, however, apply to firms without trade union representations and with less than 50 workers, even if a staff representative had been appointed as trade union delegate. A law of February 1986 amending the labour code included various changes e.g. to ensure that wage-earners received a stable income, independent of fluctuations in weekly working hours. A decree on the protection of workers exposed to benzene was issued in February 1986 with the purpose of simplifying and updating the relevant regulations, most of which dated back to 1939. A decree was issued in March 1986 which amended certain provisions in the Labour Code concerning substances and preparations hazardous to workers, thus transferring into national law the provisions of the Council Directive 79/831/EEC amending for the sixth time Directive 67/548/EEC on the classification, packaging and labelling of dangerous substances. The procedures for forwarding documents concerning inspections and verifications for health and safety purposes were laid down in a decree dated 13 March 1986. A further decree, issued that same year, laid down the health and safety requirements to be met by mobile agricultural and forestry machinery, while a further decree issued on the same date related to the protection of workers exposed to methyl bromide. A decree of January 1986 covers the flooring of fixed scaffolding while a decree of March 1986 laid down the health and safety requirements to be met by mobile agricultural and forestry machinery. A circular of January 1986 on the labelling and packaging of chemical products for industrial use defined the scope of the 1983 decrees on the labelling of chemical products and contained a "guide to EEC packaging". Following a number of accidents involving pyralene transformers, a circular of March 1986 on the hazards associated with pyralene and its decomposition products sets out, for the inspection officers involved, the risks associated with such products, the sectors most at risk, the elementary precautions to be taken, and the regulations to be applied.

Despite the Fabius Government's achievements in social policy, it was unable to prevent a rise in social inequality during its time in office, a situation arguably exacerbated by austerity measures introduced by the government. Although the rate of inflation fell, unemployment continued to increase, standing at 11% in early 1986, compared with 8% in 1983. Concern over rising inequality in France was expressed in the publication of a number of books on both "the new poverty" and "social exclusion," which had become major public preoccupations. As a result of a decline in unemployment insurance coverage, those who had no welfare assistance had to rely on local charity and local assistance. This led to cases of some supermarkets providing free food parcels for the unemployed. In 1985, the Fabius Government increased the wealth tax to provide subsidies for organisations providing basic services such as hot meals, agreed to make empty housing and surplus food stocks available, and decided to provide a basic allowance of 40 francs per day for some of the unemployed over the age of 50 who had been left out of the benefit scheme.

The Fabius Government's inability to prevent both rising unemployment and inequality arguably contributed to the defeat of the French Socialists in the 1986 legislative election, which led Fabius to step down as prime minister.

=== Scandals as prime minister ===
The symbol of a modern French socialism, he was weakened by the "Infected blood scandal". His government was accused of having knowingly let doctors give haemophiliacs transfusions of blood infected by HIV. A judicial process similar to impeachment acquitted him of all personal moral responsibility in the matter.

After the sinking of the Rainbow Warrior, a Greenpeace ship, on 10 July 1985, Prime Minister Fabius summoned journalists to his office on 22 September 1985 to read a 200-word statement in which he said: "The truth is cruel," and acknowledged that "Agents of the French secret service sank this boat. They were acting on orders." He had previously denied that the bombers of the Rainbow Warrior were in the employ of the French secret service.

=== Further political career: 1986–2002 ===
Fabius came to be seen as Lionel Jospin's rival to be Mitterrand's heir. He failed to win the First Secretaryship of the party in 1988 and 1990 (Rennes Congress) in spite of Mitterrand's support. Installed as President of the National Assembly in 1988 (at 41 years of age, the equal youngest in the history of the lower house).

In 1989, he was elected to the European Parliament where he served on the Committee on Institutional Affairs, while simultaneously remaining President of the National Assembly. He used this dual role to successfully propose the establishment of The Conference of Parliamentary Committees for Union Affairs of Parliaments of the European Union (COSAC) - a conference of Members of Parliament (MPs) drawn from parliamentary committees responsible for European Union affairs in each national parliament and Members of the European Parliament (MEPs).

He succeeded finally in becoming First Secretary of the party in 1992, but resigned after the Socialist disaster of the 1993 legislative election.

He came back as president of the National Assembly in 1997, then as Minister of Economy and Finance in Lionel Jospin's cabinet between 2000 and 2002. After Jospin's retirement, he hoped to return as Socialist leader but he failed. He declared that his mind was changed about a number of matters and he joined the left wing of the party.

=== Major figure of the Socialist Party: 2002–12 ===
In this position he was the leader of the defeated No camp in the vote that took place among the members of his party on 1 December 2004, to decide the stance that the party would take on the impending referendum on the European Constitution. He went on to lead the rebel faction of the party advocating a no vote in the 2005 Referendum, and was seen as the spearhead of the whole no campaign in France. After the no vote won, the party leader gave an assurance that he could remain in the party though he was dismissed from the party's National Executive Committee.

Fabius was a candidate in the Socialist Party's primary to be the party's candidate in the 2007 presidential election, but finished third, behind Ségolène Royal, the winner, and Dominique Strauss-Kahn. He was subsequently re-elected to the National Assembly in the June 2007 parliamentary election.

=== Minister of Foreign Affairs: 2012–16 ===
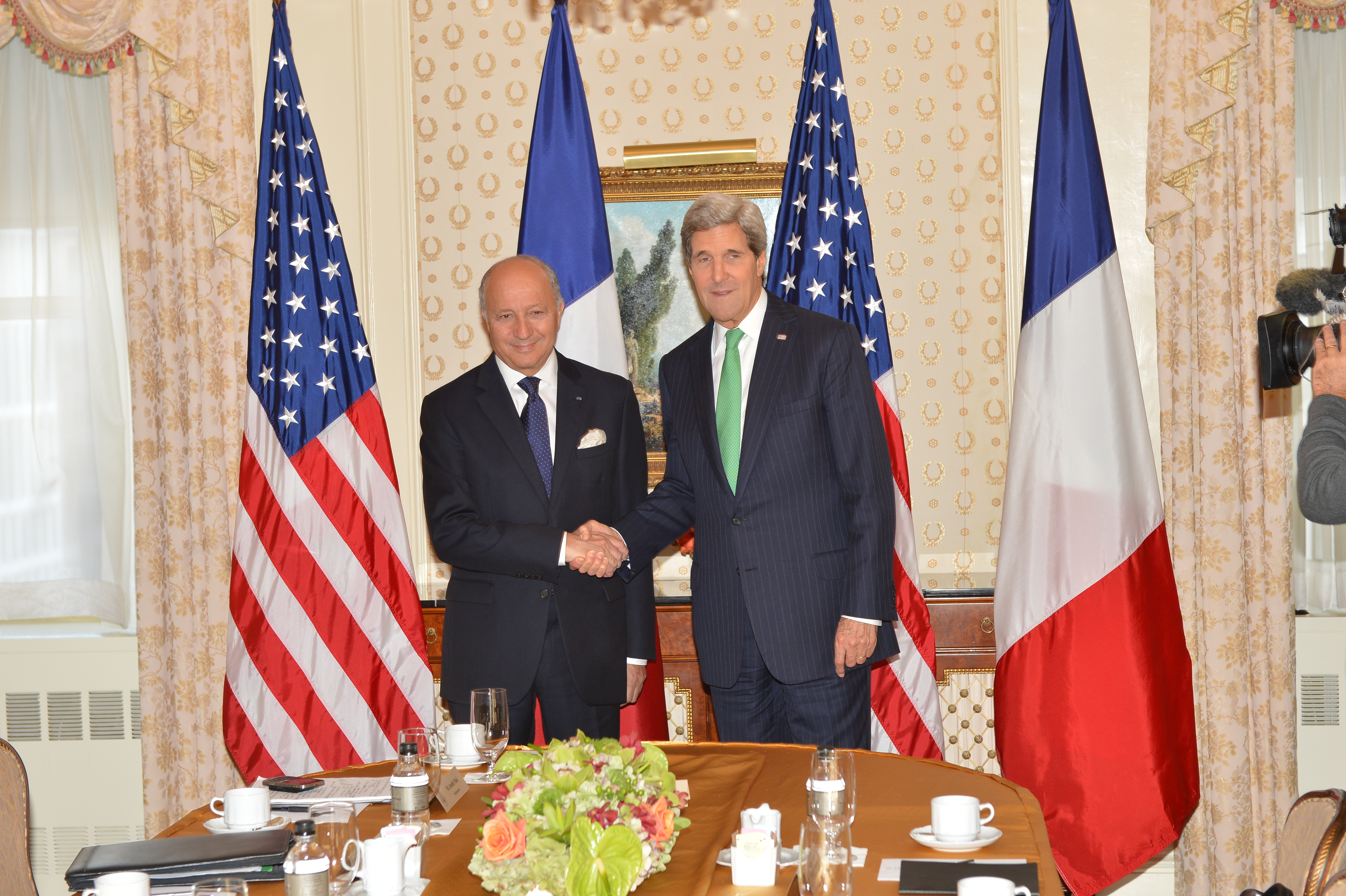
Fabius meeting with U.S. Secretary of State John Kerry

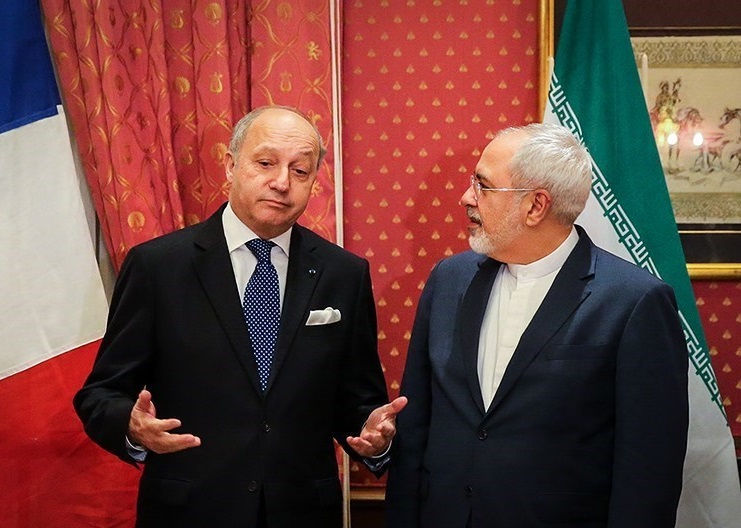
Fabius meeting with Iranian Foreign Minister Mohammad Javad Zarif

On 17 May 2012, Laurent Fabius became foreign minister in the government of Jean-Marc Ayrault, appointed prime minister by President François Hollande. His mandate had three milestones:

- he did not want to negotiate with President Bashar al-Assad to defeat what became ISIL,
- he supported Syrian rebel groups, and
- he reckoned that "Al-Nosra was doing a good job".

As foreign minister, Fabius was also chair of the 2015 United Nations Climate Change Conference which took place in Paris. His way of engaging with all delegates to achieve a successful agreement has been described as crucial, and something that will make him "go down in history as one of the great diplomats".

=== President of the Constitutional Council: 2016–25 ===
Fabius was chosen by President François Hollande to succeed Jean-Louis Debré as President of the Constitutional Council. The change became effective on 8 March 2016.

On 12 November 2023, he took part in the March for the Republic and Against Antisemitism in Paris in response to the rise in antisemitism since the start of the Gaza war.

== Political offices ==
Président of the Constitutional Council: 2016–25

Governmental functions

Prime Minister: 1984–86

Minister of the Budget: 1981–83

Minister of Research and Industry: 1983–84

Minister of the Economy, Finance and Industry: 2000–02

Minister of Foreign Affairs and International Development: 2012–16

Elected offices

Member of the European Parliament: 1989–92 (Resignation)

President of the National Assembly: 1988–92 (Resignation) / 1997–2000

Member of the National Assembly of France for Seine-Maritime: 1978–81 (2nd constituency) (Became minister in 1981) / 1986–2000 (1986–1988 proportional representation by department, 1988–2000 4th constituency, became minister in 2000) / 4th constituency; 2002–12 (Became minister in 2012). Elected in 1978, re-elected in 1981, 1986, 1988, 1993, 1997, 2002, 2007, 2012. He was replaced by his substitute Guillaume Bachelay in 2012.

Regional councillor of Upper Normandy: 1992–95 (Resignation)

General councillor of Seine-Maritime: 2000–02 (Resignation)

Mayor of Le Grand-Quevilly: 1995–2000 (Resignation)

First Deputy Mayor of Le Grand-Quevilly: 1977–95 / 2000–12 (Resignation)

Municipal councillor of Le Grand-Quevilly: 1977–2016 (Resignation). Re-elected in 1983, 1989, 1995, 2001, 2008, 2014

President of the Agglomeration community of Rouen: 2008–12 (Resignation)

Vice-president of the Agglomeration community of Rouen: 2001–08

Member of the Agglomeration community of Rouen: 2001–14. Re-elected in 2008

Political functions

First Secretary (leader) of the Socialist Party: 1992–93

== Fabius's ministry, 17 July 1984 – 20 March 1986 ==
- Laurent Fabius – Prime Minister
- Claude Cheysson – Minister of External Relations
- Roland Dumas – Minister of European Affairs
- Charles Hernu – Minister of Defence
- Pierre Joxe – Minister of the Interior and Decentralization
- Pierre Bérégovoy – Minister of Economy, Finance and Budget
- Édith Cresson – Minister of Industrial Redeployment and External Commerce
- Michel Delebarre – Minister of Labour, Employment and Vocational Training
- Robert Badinter – Minister of Justice
- Jean-Pierre Chevènement – Minister of National Education
- Michel Rocard – Minister of Agriculture
- Huguette Bouchardeau – Minister of Environment
- Paul Quilès – Minister of Transport, Town Planning and Housing
- Michel Crépeau – Minister of Commerce, Craft Industry and Tourism
- Gaston Defferre – Minister of Planning and Regional Planning
- Hubert Curien – Minister of Research and Technology
- Georgina Dufoix – Minister of Social Affairs and National Solidarity.

Changes

- 7 December 1984 – Roland Dumas succeeds Cheysson as Minister of External Relations. The position of Minister of European Affairs is abolished. Jack Lang enters the Cabinet as Minister of Culture. The office of Minister of Social Affairs and National Solidarity is abolished, and Georgina Dufoix leaves the Cabinet.
- 4 April 1985 – Henri Nallet succeeds Rocard as Minister of Agriculture.
- 21 May 1985 – 15 November 1985 Edgard Pisani appointed minister in charge of New Caledonia
- 20 September 1985 – Paul Quilès succeeds Hernu as Minister of Defense in the wake of the Rainbow Warrior bombing. Jean Auroux succeeds Quilès as Minister of Transport, Town Planning and Housing.
- 19 February 1986 – Michel Crépeau succeeds Badinter as Minister of Justice. Jean-Marie Bockel succeeds Crépeau as Minister of Commerce, Craft Industry and Tourism.

== Personal life ==
Fabius has declared over $7.9 million of assets, including a flat in Paris worth €2.7m and two country houses in Normandy and the Ariège. He has three children and was married to Françoise Castro from 1981 to 2002.

== Honours ==
=== French national honours ===
- Grand Cross of the French National Order of Merit (1984)
- Grand Officer of the Order of the Legion of Honour (2017)

=== Foreign honors ===
- Officer of the National Order of Quebec (1986)
- Grand Cross of the Order of Infante D. Henrique (1987)
- Knight Grand Cross of the Order of Merit of the Italian Republic (1990)
- Grand Cross of the Order of Merit of the Republic of Poland (1991)
- Grand Cross of the Royal Norwegian Order of Merit (1995)
- Grand Cross of the Order of the Star of Romania (1999)
- Commander with Cross with Star of the Order of Polonia Restituta (2012)
- Grand Officer of the National Order of Mali (2013)
- Honorary Knight Commander of the Order of St Michael and St George (2014)
- Grand Decoration of Honour in Gold with Sash of the Decoration of Honour for Services to the Republic of Austria (2015)
- Grand Cross of the Order of Isabella the Catholic (2015)
- Grand Cordon of the Order of the Rising Sun (2022)

== Notes and references ==
Political offices
Preceded by Maurice Papon	Minister of the Budget; 1981–1983	Succeeded by Henri Emmanuelli
Preceded by Jean-Pierre Chevènement	Minister of Industry; 1983–1984	Succeeded by Édith Cresson
Preceded by Jean-Pierre Chevènement	Minister of Research; 1983–1984	Succeeded by Hubert Curien
Preceded by Pierre Mauroy	Prime Minister of France; 1984–1986	Succeeded by Jacques Chirac
Preceded by Jacques Chaban-Delmas	President of the National Assembly; 1988–1992	Succeeded by Henri Emmanuelli
Preceded by Philippe Séguin	President of the National Assembly; 1997–2000	Succeeded by Raymond Forni
Preceded by Christian Sautter	Minister of Finance; 2000–2002	Succeeded by Francis Mer
Preceded by Alain Juppé	Minister of Foreign Affairs; 2012–2016	Succeeded by Jean-Marc Ayrault
Party political offices
Preceded by Pierre Mauroy	First Secretary of the Socialist Party; 1992–1993	Succeeded by Michel Rocard
Legal offices
Preceded by Jean-Louis Debré	President of the Constitutional Council; 2016–2025	Succeeded by Richard Ferrand
Order of precedence
Preceded by David Amiel as Minister Delegate for the Civil Service and State Reform	Order of precedence of France; Former Prime Minister	Succeeded by Édith Cresson as Former Prime Minister
