= André Henry =

French politician

André Henry (born 15 October 1934) is a French politician. He served as Minister of Free Time from 1981 to 1983, under former President François Mitterrand.

== Biography ==
He was a trade unionist for the Federation for National Education. From 1981 to 1983, he served as Minister of Free Time. In this capacity, he developed non-profit organizations in France. He also defined free time away from work as a citizenship right, and promoted ways to spend it in a leisurely way.
