= Jean Auroux =

French politician (born 1942)

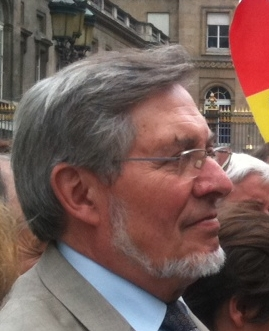

Jean Auroux (born 19 September 1942 in Thizy, Rhône) is a French politician. He served as Minister of Labour from 1981 to 1983, under former President François Mitterrand.

He started his career as a school teacher, and became the Mayor of Roanne. In 2002, he was sued for corruption in his capacity as Mayor, but he was let go in 2011.
