= Michel Crépeau =

French politician

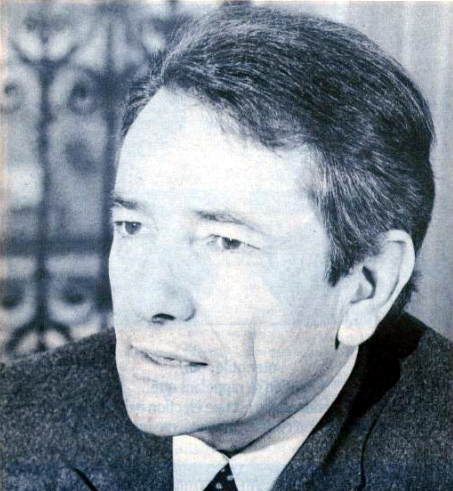
- Photo of Michel Crépeau

Minister of Justice
- In office 19 February 1986 – 20 March 1986
- President: François Mitterrand
- Prime Minister: Laurent Fabius
- Preceded by: Robert Badinter
- Succeeded by: Albin Chalandon

Personal details
- Born: 30 October 1930 Fontenay-le-Comte, France
- Died: 30 March 1999 (aged 68) Paris, France
- Party: Radical Party of the Left
- Profession: Lawyer
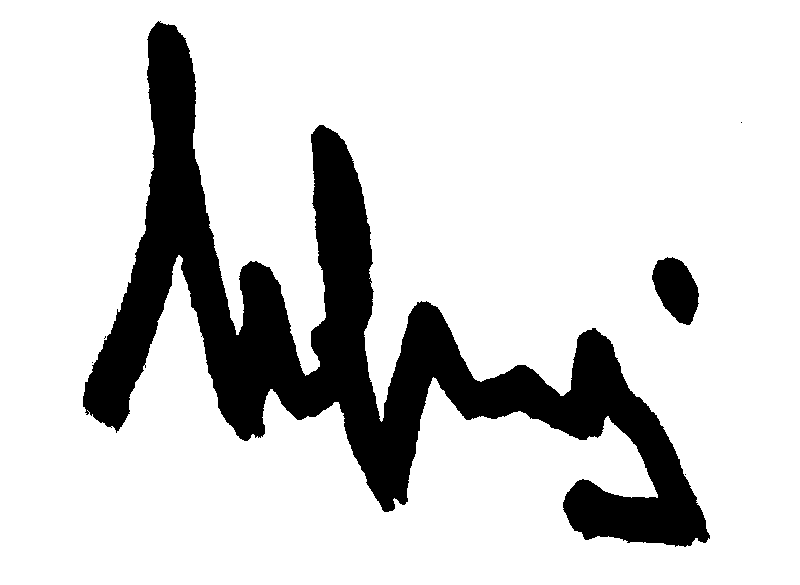
- Signature

Michel Crépeau (French pronunciation: [miʃɛl kʁepo]; 30 October 1930, Fontenay-le-Comte, Vendée – 30 March 1999, Paris) was a French centre-left politician.

Born in 1930, barrister, he joined the Radical Party. When it split in 1972, he founded the Movement of Left Radicals (MRG) which chosen the alliance with the Socialist Party and the French Communist Party. Elected Mayor of La Rochelle in 1971, and Member of French National Assembly representing of Charente Maritime département in 1973, he kept these terms until his death in 1999.

MRG candidate in the 1981 presidential election, he obtained 2.2% of votes in the first round, then he called to vote for François Mitterrand in the second round. He became his Environment Minister from 1981 to 1983, then his Trade and Craft Industry Minister from 1983 to 1986. When Robert Badinter was nominated President of the Constitutional Council, in February 1986, he succeeded him as Justice Minister but the Left lost the legislative election one month later and, consequently, he was forced to resign.

Michel Crépeau died in Paris on 30 March 1999, after a heart attack which had arisen few days earlier during a parliamentary session of the National Assembly.

Political offices
Preceded by Robert Badinter	Minister of Justice; 1986	Succeeded by Albin Chalandon
