= Michel Rocard =

88th Prime Minister of France (1930–2016)

Michel Rocard AC OQ
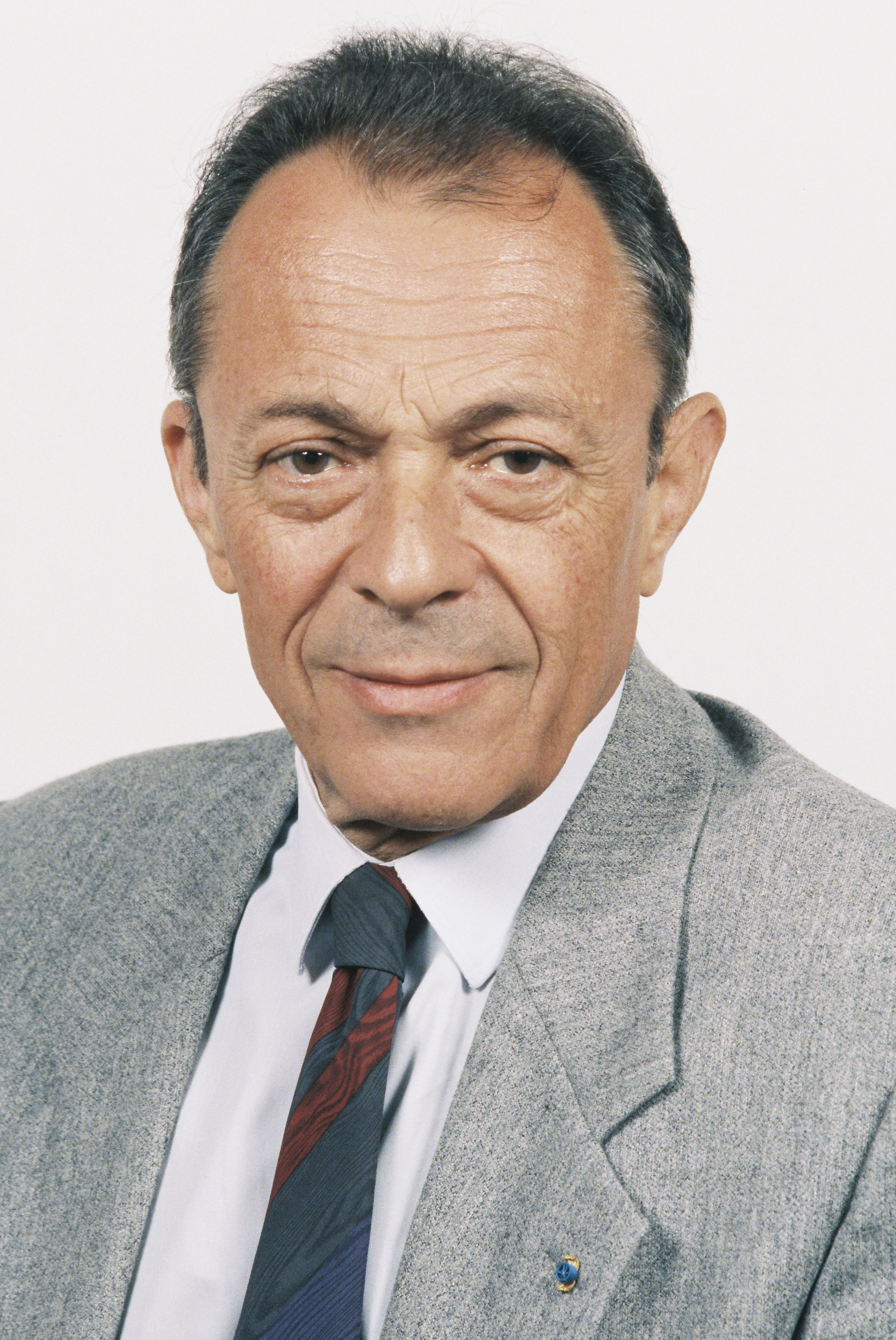
- Rocard in 1994

Member of the French Senate for Yvelines
- In office 24 September 1995 – 18 November 1997
- Succeeded by: Jacques Bellanger

Member of the European Parliament
- In office 19 July 1994 – 31 January 2009

First Secretary of the Socialist Party
- In office 24 October 1993 – 19 June 1994
- Preceded by: Laurent Fabius
- Succeeded by: Henri Emmanuelli

Prime Minister of France
- In office 10 May 1988 – 15 May 1991
- President: François Mitterrand
- Preceded by: Jacques Chirac
- Succeeded by: Édith Cresson

Minister of Agriculture
- In office 22 March 1983 – 4 April 1985
- Prime Minister: Pierre Mauroy; Laurent Fabius
- Preceded by: Édith Cresson
- Succeeded by: Henri Nallet

Minister of Territorial Development
- In office 22 May 1981 – 22 March 1983
- Prime Minister: Pierre Mauroy
- Preceded by: Fernand Icart
- Succeeded by: Gaston Defferre

Mayor of Conflans-Sainte-Honorine
- In office 25 March 1977 – 19 July 1994
- Preceded by: Gilbert Legrand
- Succeeded by: Jean-Paul Huchon

Member of the National Assembly for Yvelines
- In office 23 June 1988 – 23 July 1988
- Preceded by: Proportional representation
- Succeeded by: Jean Guigné
- Constituency: Yvelines's 7th
- In office 2 April 1986 – 14 May 1988
- Preceded by: Proportional representation
- Succeeded by: End of proportional representation
- Constituency: Yvelines
- In office 3 April 1978 – 24 July 1981
- Preceded by: Gérard Godon
- Succeeded by: Martine Frachon
- Constituency: Yvelines's 3rd
- In office 27 October 1969 – 1 April 1973
- Preceded by: Pierre Clostermann
- Succeeded by: Marc Lauriol
- Constituency: Yvelines's 4th

Personal details
- Born: 23 August 1930 Courbevoie, France
- Died: 2 July 2016 (aged 85) Paris, France
- Party: PS (1974–2016)
- Other political affiliations: SFIO (till 1967); PSU (1967–1974)
- Relations: Yves Rocard (father)
- Children: Francis Rocard
- Education: Lycée Louis-le-Grand
- Alma mater: Sciences Po, ÉNA
- Occupation: Civil servant

Michel Rocard AC OQ (French: [miʃɛl ʁɔkaʁ]; 23 August 1930 – 2 July 2016) was a French politician and a member of the Socialist Party (PS). He served as Prime Minister under François Mitterrand from 1988 to 1991 during which he created the Revenu minimum d'insertion (RMI), a social minimum welfare program for indigents, and achieved the Matignon Accords regarding the status of New Caledonia. He was a member of the European Parliament, and was strongly involved in European policies until 2009. In 2007, he joined a Commission under the authority of Nicolas Sarkozy's Minister of Education, Xavier Darcos.

== Early life ==
Rocard was born in Courbevoie, Hauts-de-Seine, to a Protestant family. The son of nuclear physicist Yves Rocard, he entered politics as a student leader while he was studying at Sciences Po. He became chair of the French Socialist Students affiliated to the main French Socialist party at the time, the French Section of the Workers' International (SFIO), and studied at the École nationale d'administration (ENA), after which he chose to enter the prestigious Inspection des finances. As an anti-colonialist, he went to Algeria and wrote a report regarding the widely-ignored refugee camps of the Algerian War (1954–1962). The report was leaked to the newspapers Le Monde and France Observateur in April 1959, which almost cost Rocard his position. Michel Rocard was a certified glider pilot.

== Unified Socialist Party ==
Having left the SFIO because of Guy Mollet's position towards the Algerian War, Rocard led the dissident Unified Socialist Party (PSU) from 1967 to 1974. He was a prominent figure during the May 1968 crisis, supporting the auto-gestionary project. He ran in the 1969 presidential election but obtained only 3.6% of the vote. Some months later, he was elected deputy for the Yvelines département, defeating the former Prime minister Maurice Couve de Murville. He lost his parliamentary seat in 1973, but retook it in 1978.

In 1973–74, he participated in the LIP conflict, selling watches with the workers and participating, behind the scenes, in the attempts to find an employer who would take back the factory, which was on the verge of being liquidated.

== Socialist Party ==
In 1974, he joined François Mitterrand and the renewed Socialist Party (PS), which had replaced the old SFIO. Most of the PSU members and a part of the French and Democratic Confederation of Labour (CFDT) trade union – the non-Marxist section of the left that Rocard famously defined as the "Second Left" – followed him.

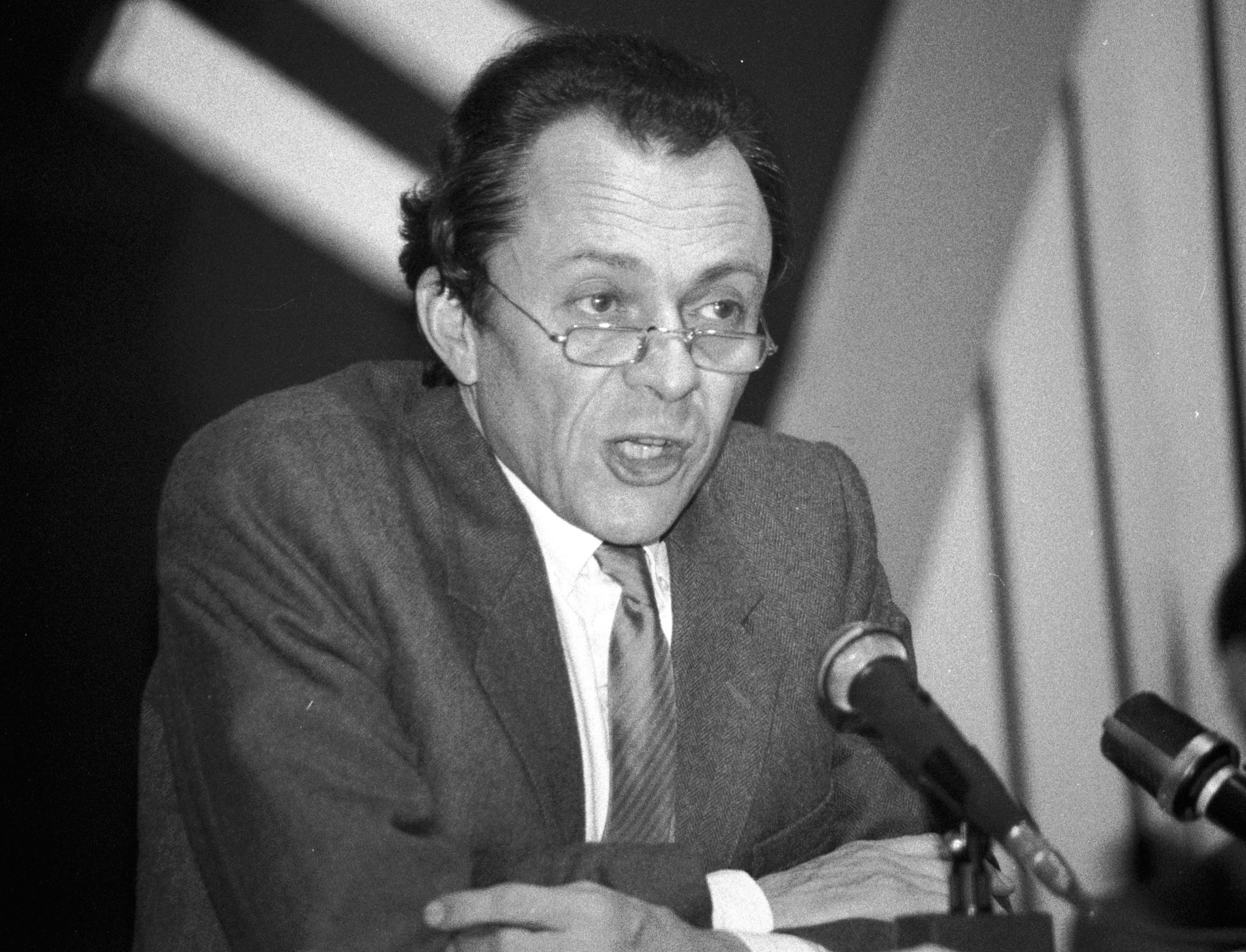
Michel Rocard, October 1981

Elected mayor of Conflans-Sainte-Honorine in 1977, he led the opposition to Mitterrand inside the Socialist Party (as a candidate of the right wing of the party). After the defeat of the left at the 1978 legislative election, he tried to take over the leadership of the party. In spite of his alliance with Pierre Mauroy, the number 2 of the PS, he lost at the Metz Congress (1979). As the Socialist Party's most popular politician at the time (including Mitterrand himself), he announced that he would run for president; but his "Call of Conflans" did not result in majority support within the PS, and he withdrew his candidacy. Mitterrand was the successful Socialist candidate in the 1981 presidential election.

From the 1970s to the 1990s, Rocard's group inside the Socialist Party, known as "les rocardiens", advocated a re-alignment of French socialism through a clearer acceptance of the market economy, more decentralisation and less state control. It was largely influenced by Scandinavian social democracy, and stood in opposition to Mitterrand's initial agenda of nationalization, programmed in the 110 Propositions for France. Nonetheless, the "rocardiens" always remained a minority.

=== In government ===
Under Mitterrand's first presidency, he was Minister of Territorial Development and Minister of Planning from 1981 to 1983 and Minister of Agriculture from 1983 to 1985. He resigned from the cabinet in due to his opposition to the introduction of the proportional system for the legislative elections. He hoped, in vain, that Mitterrand would not run for re-election so he could be the PS candidate in the 1988 presidential election.

After Mitterrand's re-election, he was chosen as Prime Minister (May 1988 – May 1991). Indeed, Rocard was popular and his position, on the right wing of the PS, corresponded with the slogan of the electoral campaign, "a United France." He formed a cabinet including 4 center-right ministers. As Prime Minister, he led the Matignon Accords regarding the status of New Caledonia, which ended the troubles in this overseas territory. His record in office also include a decrease in unemployment and a large-scale reform of the welfare state's financing system. He created a minimum social assistance scheme, the RMI, which helped to alleviate poverty.

=== Party leadership ===
Rocard's poor relations with Mitterrand, notably during his mandate as Prime Minister, were notorious. In addition, the Socialists only held a small parliamentary majority. In 1991, when his popularity decreased, President Mitterrand forced him to resign. However, according to Mauroy, who led the party, Rocard stood as the "natural candidate" for the following presidential elections. After the 1993 electoral disaster, he became leader of the PS by advocating a political "big-bang", that was to say a questioning of the left/right divide. His speech did not have the desired effect.

Rocard remained as leader of the Socialist Party for only one year, in part because of the PS's complete defeat during the 1994 European elections. The defeat was in part due to the success of the list of the Left Radicals Movement, which was covertly supported by President Mitterrand. Consequently, he was toppled by the left wing of the party and lost his last chance to run for president the next year. Having lost his deputy's seat in 1993, he became Senator of Yvelines from 1995 to 1997. His supporters within the Socialist Party became allies of candidate Lionel Jospin, who was Prime Minister in 1997–2002, and then Dominique Strauss-Kahn.

=== Member of European Parliament ===
Rocard was a member of the European Parliament (1994–2009), and chaired the Committee on Development and Cooperation (1997–1999), the Committee on Employment and Social Affairs (1999–2002) and the Committee on Culture, Youth, Education, the Media and Sport. Michel Rocard was known for his hostility for proposed directives to allow software patents in Europe, and has been an outspoken opponent of what he considers to be manoeuvres to force the decision on this issue.

On the French political scene, Rocard presented himself as the political heir of Pierre Mendès-France, known for his moral rigour, and as the politician who "speaks the truth". After Mitterrand's death, he caused controversy when he said, about the former president, "he was not an honest man". An impersonator mocked him for his problems of elocution. In the run up to the presidential elections in 2007, Rocard called for an alliance between the Socialists and the centrist Union for French Democracy (UDF) party of François Bayrou in an effort to defeat Union for a Popular Movement (UMP) candidate Nicolas Sarkozy. Ségolène Royal, the PS candidate, rejected any such compromise, lamenting that she was once again obliged to face obstacles from within her own party. Rocard also publicly admitted, after the election, having asked Ségolène Royal to step down in his favor in March 2007, one month before the first round of voting.

Like other Socialist politicians, such as Jack Lang or Hubert Védrine, who accepted similar positions, Rocard accepted a post on the Committee on the re-evaluation of the teaching profession, which was placed under the "high authority" of Sarkozy's Minister of Education Xavier Darcos. Criticized by Medhi Ouraoui, national delegate of the PS, Rocard claimed it was a "democrat's duty" to participate in such Commissions and that he was "not concerned" by the "game of the President of the Republic [consisting of making of such left-wing participations] political symbols". He furthermore explained that he had accepted to speak before the Gracques' spring university (a group of senior left-wing civil servants who advocated a centrist strategy) because political parties were not suited any more to serious reflexion. Finally, he again claimed that the (Marxist) SFIO had been created in 1905 on a fundamental "ambiguity", that of whether to accept or reject market economy.

He remained active in European Union politics as late as June 2014, when he delivered his thoughts on the British on the 70th anniversary of the D-Day landings in Normandy. Rocard quoted Churchill's words about the "United States of Europe", issued a strong condemnation of the UK policy of the 40 years to that date, and begged for a European strongman, which he saw in Martin Schulz. He concluded by inviting the UK to leave.

Rocard was also a supporter of the Campaign for the Establishment of a United Nations Parliamentary Assembly, an organisation which campaigns for democratic reformation of the United Nations.

== Political career ==
Governmental functions

Prime minister : 1988–1991 (Resignation).

Minister of State, minister of Planning and Land Development : 1981–1983.

Minister of Agriculture : 1983–1985 (Resignation).

Electoral mandates

European Parliament

Member of the European Parliament : 1994–2009 (Resignation). Elected in 1994, reelected in 1999, 2004.

Senate of France

Senator of Yvelines : 1995–1997 (Resignation). Elected in 1995.

National Assembly of France

Member of the National Assembly of France for Yvelines (4th constituency) : 1969–1973 / 1978–1981 (Became minister in 1981) / 1986–1988 (Became Prime minister in 1988). Elected in 1969, reelected in 1978, 1981, 1986, 1988

Regional Council

Regional councillor of Île-de-France : 1978–1988 (Resignation). Elected in 1986.

Municipal Council

Mayor of Conflans-Sainte-Honorine : 1977–1994. Reelected in 1983, 1989.

Municipal councillor of Conflans-Sainte-Honorine : 1977–2001. Reelected in 1983, 1989, 1995.

Political functions

First Secretary (leader) of the Socialist Party (France) : 1993–1994 (Resignation).

== Health and death ==
In June 2007, Rocard was admitted to the Calcutta Medical Research Institute, Kolkata, India where doctors found he had a blood clot in the brain and was operated upon. He was discharged from the hospital on 10 July 2007.

On 30 March 2012, Rocard was on a visit to Stockholm, Sweden to attend a meeting regarding the Arctic Council. During a break at noon, he became ill and was taken to the Karolinska University Hospital. Doctors decided later that day that Rocard should spend the night at the hospital's intensive-care medicine unit for observation.

Rocard died on 2 July 2016 in Paris, at the age of 85.

== Bibliography ==
- Michel Rocard, Rapport sur les camps de regroupement et autres textes sur la guerre d'Algérie, Editions Mille et une nuits, 2003 (Report on regroupment camps and other texts on the Algerian War)
- Michel Rocard, Le Coeur à l'ouvrage, Odile Jacob, 1987
- Michel Rocard, Entretiens, Paris, Flammarion, 2001
- Ch. Piaget, Lip, Postface by Michel Rocard, Lutter Stock, 1973
- Collective, Lip : affaire non-classée, Postface by Michel Rocard, Syros, 1975

Political offices
| Preceded by Fernand Icart | Minister of Territorial Development; 1981–1983 | Succeeded by Gaston Defferre |
| Preceded by Jean Lecanuet | Minister of Planning; 1981–1983 | Succeeded by Gaston Defferre |
| Preceded by Édith Cresson | Minister of Agriculture; 1983–1985 | Succeeded by Henri Nallet |
| Preceded by Jacques Chirac | Prime Minister of France; 1988–1991 | Succeeded by Édith Cresson |
Party political offices
| Preceded by Laurent Fabius | First Secretary of the Socialist Party; 1993–1994 | Succeeded by Henri Emmanuelli |
