= Lionel Jospin =

Prime Minister of France from 1997 to 2002

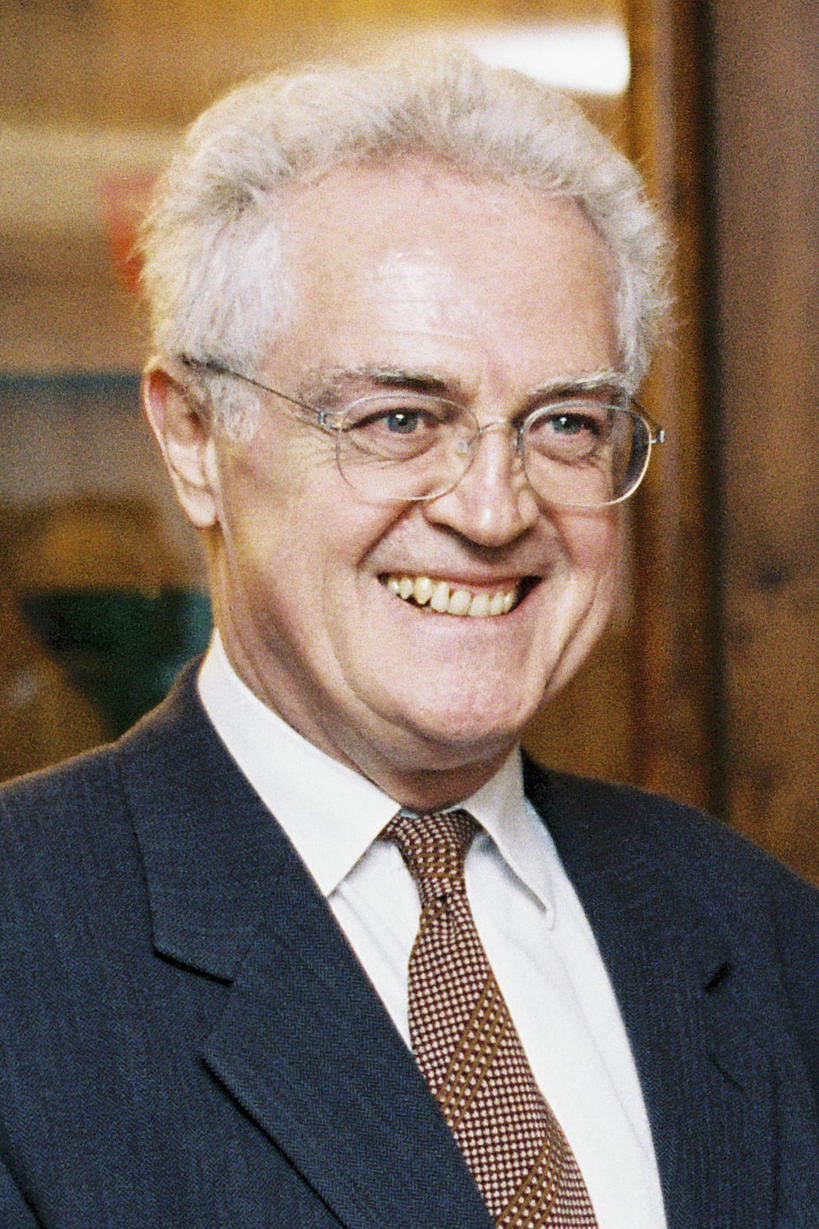
- Jospin in 1996

Prime Minister of France
- In office 2 June 1997 – 6 May 2002
- President: Jacques Chirac
- Preceded by: Alain Juppé
- Succeeded by: Jean-Pierre Raffarin

Member of the Constitutional Council
- In office 6 January 2015 – 11 March 2019
- Appointed by: Claude Bartolone
- President: Jean-Louis Debré; Laurent Fabius
- Preceded by: Jacques Barrot
- Succeeded by: Alain Juppé

First Secretary of the Socialist Party
- In office 14 October 1995 – 2 June 1997
- Preceded by: Henri Emmanuelli
- Succeeded by: François Hollande
- In office 24 January 1981 – 14 May 1988
- Preceded by: François Mitterrand
- Succeeded by: Pierre Mauroy

Minister of National Education
- In office 12 May 1988 – 2 April 1992
- Prime Minister: Michel Rocard; Édith Cresson
- Preceded by: René Monory
- Succeeded by: Jack Lang

Minister of Youth and Sport
- In office 12 May 1988 – 16 May 1991
- Prime Minister: Michel Rocard
- Preceded by: Alain Calmat
- Succeeded by: Frédérique Bredin

Personal details
- Born: 12 July 1937 Meudon, Seine-et-Oise, France
- Died: 22 March 2026 (aged 88) Paris, France
- Resting place: Montparnasse Cemetery, Paris
- Party: Socialist
- Other political affiliations: Internationalist Communist Organisation (historical)
- Spouse(s): Élisabeth Dannenmuller (div). Sylviane Agacinski
- Children: Eva and Hugo
- Relatives: Noëlle Châtelet (sister)
- Education: Sciences Po; École nationale d'administration

Lionel Robert Jospin (French: [ljɔnɛl ʁɔbɛʁ ʒɔspɛ̃]; 12 July 1937 – 22 March 2026) was a French politician who served as Prime Minister of France from 1997 to 2002. Jospin was first secretary of the Socialist Party from 1995 to 1997 and the party's candidate for president in the 1995 and 2002 elections. In 1995, he was narrowly defeated in the second round by Jacques Chirac. In 2002, he was eliminated in the first round after finishing behind both Chirac and Jean-Marie Le Pen, prompting him to announce his retirement from politics. In 2015, he was appointed to the Constitutional Council by National Assembly President Claude Bartolone.

== Early life ==
Lionel Robert Jospin was born on 12 July 1937 to a Protestant family in Meudon, Seine (nowadays Hauts-de-Seine), a suburb of Paris, and was the son of Mireille Dandieu Aliette and Robert Jospin. He attended the Lycée Janson-de-Sailly before studying at Sciences Po and the École nationale d'administration (ÉNA). He was active in students' unions protesting against the war in Algeria (1954–1962). He completed his military service as an officer in charge of armoured training in Trier, Germany.

== Political career ==
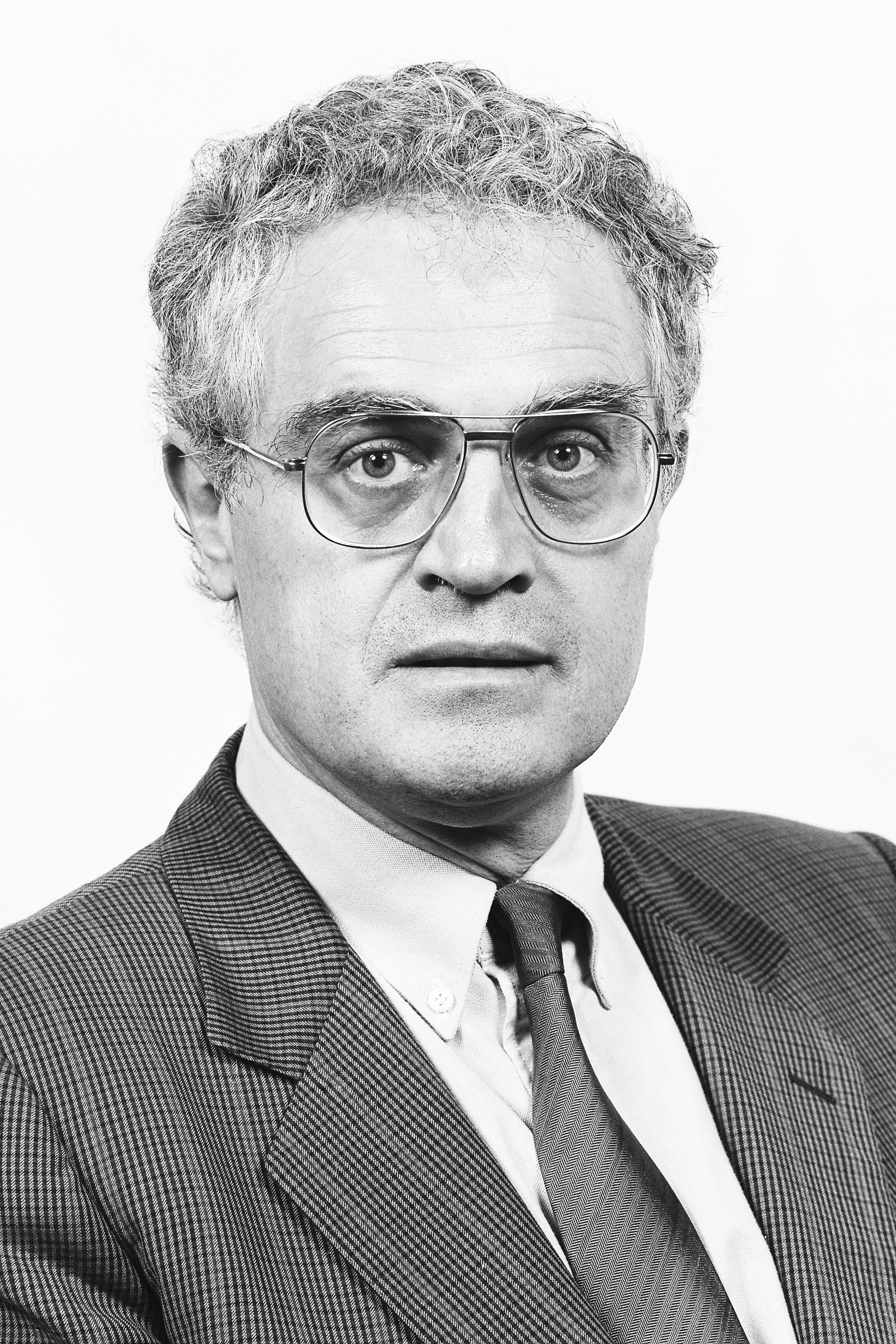
Jospin in 1984

Throughout Jospin's career his public image was, as summarized by John Gaffney of Aston University, "dour, grumpy, rather cold, prone to temper and exasperation ('austere')". After his graduation from the ÉNA in 1965, Jospin entered the Ministry of Foreign Affairs as secretary of foreign affairs. He became in charge of economic cooperation there, and worked with Ernest-Antoine Seillière, future leader of the MEDEF employers' union.

Representative of a generation of left-wingers who criticized the old SFIO Socialist Party, he joined a Trotskyist group, the Internationalist Communist Organization (OCI) in the 1960s, before entering the renewed Socialist Party (PS) in 1971. Joining François Mitterrand's circle, he became the second highest-ranking member of the party in 1979, then its first secretary when Mitterrand was elected president in 1981. When President Mitterrand decided, in 1982–83, to change his economic policy to give priority to the struggle against inflation and for a hard currency, Jospin justified his choice. After Laurent Fabius was chosen as prime minister in 1984, a rivalry between these two political heirs of Mitterrand broke out when they competed for the leadership of the 1986 legislative campaign.

In 1988, after Mitterrand's reelection, Jospin left the PS leadership and, though Mitterrand considered naming him prime minister, he was nominated for minister of education. Under Jospin's tenure as education minister, teacher training was consolidated, the lycées and universities were reformed, teachers' salaries improved, and technical and vocational education were reformed, which the socialists saw as a means of improving economic performance, tackling youth unemployment, and attaining social justice.

Jospin's rivalry with Fabius intensified and caused an internal crisis, notably during the Rennes Congress (1990). The party's mitterrandist faction split because Jospin's followers allied with the other factions to prevent Fabius's election as first secretary. This damaged Jospin's relationship with Mitterrand and, after the Socialist Party's failure in the March 1992 local elections, Jospin was not included in the new government formed by Pierre Bérégovoy.

As a member of the National Assembly, Jospin served first as a representative of Paris (1978–86), and then of Haute-Garonne département (1986–88). He lost his seat in the National Assembly in the Socialists' landslide defeat in the 1993 legislative election and announced his political retirement. In 1993, Jospin was appointed ministre plénipotentiaire, 2nd class (a rank of ambassador), a position he held until his appointment as prime minister in 1997, but he was not appointed to any embassy. In 1995, Jospin claimed a necessity to "take stock" of the mitterrandist inheritance so as to restore the credibility of the Socialist Party. He was selected as the Socialist candidate for president against the PS leader Henri Emmanuelli. In the run-up to the election, Jospin made various policy proposals, such as a programme for the environment, an extension of social services, a housebuilding programme, the rebuilding of run-down parts of cities, and a 37-hour workweek.

Following the Socialists' landslide defeats of 1992–94, Jospin was considered to have little chance of victory. But he did surprisingly well, leading in the first round and losing only very narrowly to Jacques Chirac in the final runoff election. His performance was seen to mark a revival of the Socialists as a strong force in French politics and he returned to being the party's first secretary. Jospin built a new coalition with the other left-wing parties: the French Communist Party, the Greens, the Left Radical Party, and the dissident Citizen and Republican Movement. Two years later, Chirac decided to call an early election for the National Assembly, hoping for a personal endorsement. The move backfired: the "Plural Left" won a parliamentary majority and Jospin became prime minister. Jospin was a member of the Club of Madrid.

== Prime minister ==
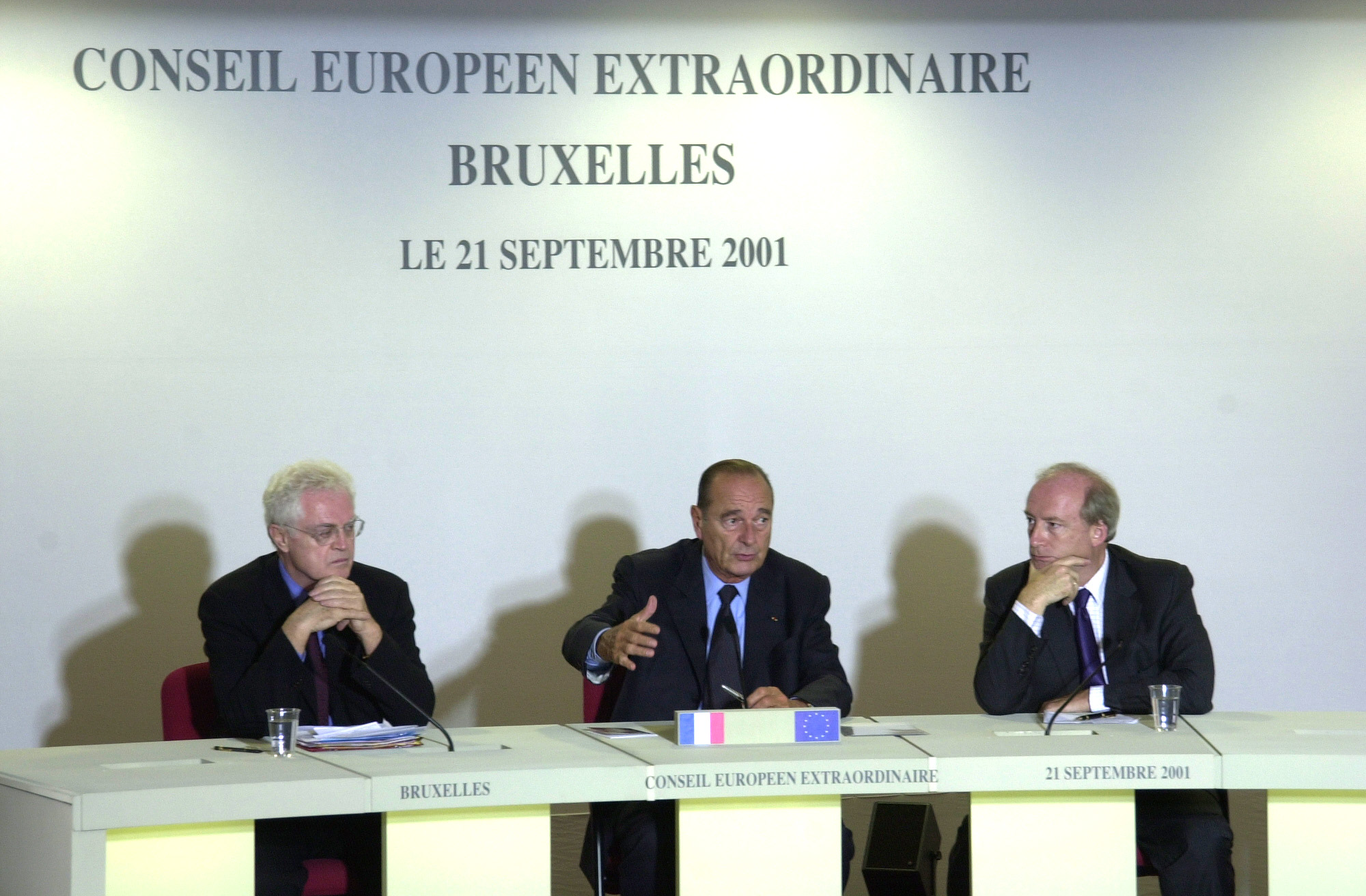
Jospin with Jacques Chirac and Hubert Védrine, 2001

Jospin served as prime minister during France's third "cohabitation" government under President Chirac from 1997 to 2002. Despite his previous image as a rigid socialist, Jospin sold state-owned enterprises and lowered the VAT, income tax and company tax rates.

Jospin's government also introduced the 35-hour workweek, provided additional health insurance for those on the lowest incomes through the creation of Couverture maladie universelle (CMU, which made health care in France a universal right, and was regarded by Jospin and Martine Aubry as one of the "beacons" of their incumbency), promoted the representation of women in politics, expanded the social security system, and created the PACS – a civil partnership or union between two people of any genders. During his term, with the help of a favourable economic situation, unemployment fell by 900,000. There were several women but no ethnic minorities in Jospin's government.

The "law against social exclusion" (1998) extended social security and introduced various measures to combat poverty. These included:

1. The optimization of extra earnings for Revenu minimum d'insertion recipients.
2. The introduction of CMU.
3. Guaranteeing supplies of telephone, water, and electricity services for the impoverished, such as by paying off outstanding bills.
4. Increased housing allowances and subsidized housing "concomitant with the introduction of a tax on unused apartments".
5. Direct levels of assistance to groups with special problems in the labour market (including low-skilled persons, older unemployed persons, young people, and the long-term unemployed) through integration, internship, and continuing education programmes, personal guidance and mentoring, and wage subsidies.

Continuous improvements were made in social benefits during Jospin's time in office, together with increases to the minimum wage. A 3% increase was carried out in the RMI and two similar minimum income guarantees in 1998, backdated a year, while expenditure on healthcare and education was increased. A parity law was introduced that obliged every party to field an equal number of female and male candidates in national elections. A decree was issued immediately after the start of Jospin's time in office that boosted the bonus paid to parents at the start of the school year from 420 to 1,600 francs for households with a monthly income of less than 11,600 francs.

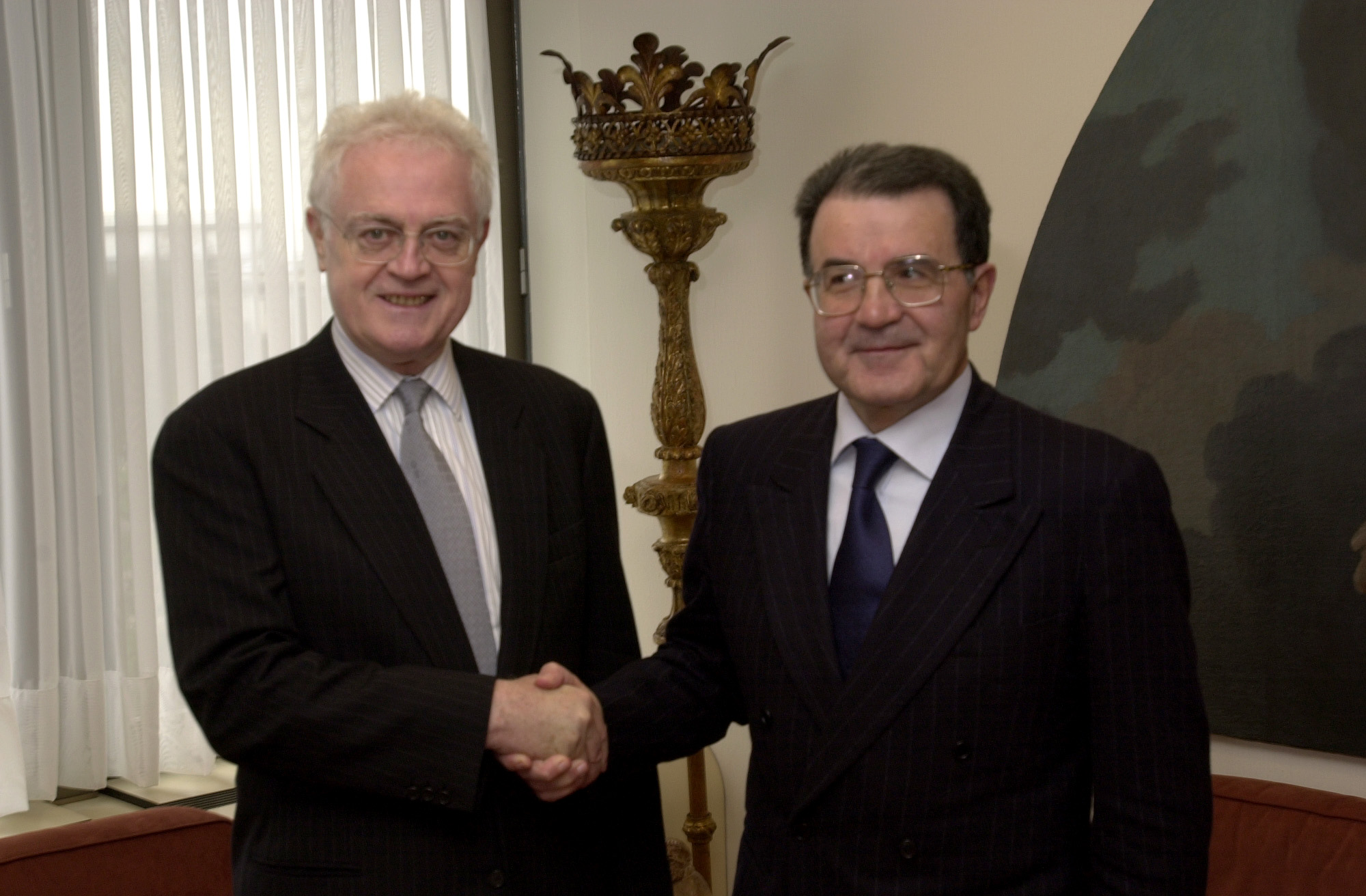
Jospin and Romano Prodi, 2001

Reductions were made in employee's health-insurance contributions, with employee premiums reduced from 6.75 to 0.75%. To compensate for lost revenues, the CSG was raised from 3.5% to 7.5%, while income from rent and capital was taxed more. This almost complete shift of employee's health-insurance contributions to the welfare tax CGT resulted in the purchasing power of employees rising by about 1%. Various measures were also taken to make the tax system more progressive. The Jospin government began taxing capital assets by introducing a tax on savings, particularly life insurance. A major reform of the welfare tax CSG was carried out, which doubled the welfare state's percentage share of taxes and resulted in an almost 10% fall in the share of contributions. Other measures included an increase in revenues from the wealth tax, a reduction in the lower marginal tax rate from 10.5% to 7%, a rise in taxation on profits from stock options from 40% to 50%, a 1997 increase in the exemption for the lowest tax bracket, a reduction in taxes on apartment sales, housing, and other fees, and the abolition of taxes on cars and roadways. In addition, income tax cuts were introduced in March and September 2000 that disproportionately favoured low and non-earners.

An "employment premium" was introduced in 2002, similar to tax credits in the UK and US, providing a state subsidy to low-wage earners. Within a few years, eight million people had benefited from this scheme. Funds were provided for the renovation of public housing, while company pension savings plans were extended to cover small and medium enterprises. The Jospin government also made it possible for SMEs to jointly establish this kind of fund. A state-supervised reserve fund for old-age insurance was established, which created marginal capital coverage and was designed to protect pension levels from financial-market risks. Spending on education increased by 19% from 1997 to 2002, while spending on labour increased by 13% over that period. Social contributions for low-income workers were reduced, and a 5% increase in the RMI was carried out. A reform of women's rights and anonymous childbirth was carried out, together with a number of progressive educational reforms. These included the re-launching of the Educational Priority Zones, the establishment of the "Tourism And The Handicapped" ("Tourisme et handicap") programme, the implementation of language instruction as a priority in primary schools, the establishment of the "Plan Handiscole" for the education of disabled children and adolescents and their integration into life at school, the establishment of a national home-tutoring programme, and the introduction of local education and citizenship education contracts.

A wide range of child-centred policies were also implemented. These included the introduction of mandatory civics instruction in secondary schools, the introduction of financial support for child illness care together with parental time-off obligations, the introduction of special education support (parents d'enfants handicaps), a law against paedophile pornography, the establishment of a government student lunch programme, the launching of "Initiatives citoyennes" to teach children how to live together, the launching of a campaign against "hazing" of children, the creation of programmes for parental involvement in schools together with national campaigns for the elections of parent-representatives, the passage of a law designed to safeguard children's rights and campaign against violence in schools, a law against the prostitution of minors that included penalties for clients, the establishment of the "Childhood and the Media" association against violence in the media, and the creation of 40,000 new child-care places.

Various measures were introduced to enhance facilities and benefits for people with disabilities. A turnaround of the justice system was carried out to ensure that a defendant really is innocent until proved guilty. The linking of benefit payments to the cost of living was introduced, together with a one billion franc emergency package for the unemployed. In 1998 a FRF 500 million budget was established to partly fund the training benefit payable to the unemployed. Improvements in the handicapped employment service COTOREP were carried out, while measures were introduced to upgrade handicapped access to public transport together with all types of buildings used by members of the general public.

The government established the right of an employee to take time off work if a child of the family was seriously ill. This was supported by a grant which replaced lost income to some extent and provided financial support to parents returning to work after a child's illness. A law was passed against discrimination (on sexual, racial, physical grounds, etc.) to bring French law into line with new European Union anti-discrimination legislation. A campaign was launched against violence and racketeering, accompanied by the implementation of an "SOS Violence" telephone number. Various transport programmes were introduced, both mass and individual. An improved housing allowance was introduced, together with longer fixed contracts.

A law passed in July 2000 on the organization and promotion of physical and sports activities emphasized the obligation to take into account the different types of disabilities in the organization of physical and sports education programmes within educational and vocational training centres or special facilities. As a result of the legislation, sports specialists and teachers were required to receive an initial special training and continuing education to better facilitate the access of disabled persons to physical and sports activities. Laws were also passed in November 2001 and March 2002 that added to the list of grounds of discrimination physical appearance, sexual orientation, age, and genetic characteristics.

A law was passed in 1999 which provided legal access to and development of palliative care, "allowing legal leave to support a family member in the last stage of a terminal illness". The Solidarity and Urban Renewal Law (2000) required that at least 20% of the housing stock in all urban municipalities over 3,500 inhabitants should consist of social housing. while a law was passed on sexual equality in the workplace, including an article repealing the ban on night work for women, in order to comply with EU sex equality legislation. A law was passed in July 2001 that included various social, educational and cultural provisions that lay the legal foundation for the implementation of back to work assistance programmes included in an unemployment insurance agreement from January that year. An anti-discrimination law was passed in November that same year which safeguarded employees from all forms of discrimination affecting training, such as access to recruitment procedures or in-company training.

The 'social modernization' bill included work-related provisions such as measures to combat 'moral harassment' (bullying) at work, measures to combat precarious employment (through restrictions on fixed-term contracts), and improved accreditation of vocational skills and experience. The law also contained a wide range of redundancy provisions such as the requirement to convene negotiations on the 35-hour week prior to any redundancy plan, enhanced powers for works councils, a contribution to the regeneration of closed sites by companies with a workforce of over 1,000, nine-month redeployment leave for redundant workers, and the doubling of the minimum redundancy compensation. A law on 'new economic regulations' was passed which aimed at adding an 'ethical' aspect to financial practices, "clarifying competition rules, improving social dialogue and enforcing the rights of consumers". In terms of industrial relations, the new law strengthened (to some extent) the powers of works councils in takeovers, mergers and proposed share exchanges. The Social and Medical Action Act, introduced in January 2002, provided additional protection for the rights of users of social and social/medical facilities.

A wide range of new social benefits were introduced, including the Allocation Specifique d'attente (ASA), an additional benefit for unemployed persons under the age of 60 who had contributed or at least 40 years to the pension insurance, l'allocation spécifique d'attente (APA), a home care allowance for the over-60's which made it possible for beneficiaries to spend their old age at home rather than in a care home, a benefit for seriously injured or sick children, and a benefit to encourage women to re-enter the labour market. A new benefit was introduced called the Prime pour l'Emploi (PPE) which, as noted by one study, "is presented as a means of 'compensating taxes on and contributions from workers income,' which aim both to 'aid return to work' and to provide 'maintenance in work'."

An enhancement of the universal CMU health scheme was carried out, through the abolition of the spending ceiling for dentistry and the extension of the 'direct settlement' system for former benefit recipients whose income now exceeded the statutory ceiling. Paid paternity leave was introduced, and a law was passed to reform employee savings schemes The main purpose of this legislation was to increase the duration and scope of employee savings schemes, by extending them to employees of small and medium-sized businesses and increasing the 'lock-in' period for employee savings from 5 to 10 years.

The Jospin Government also established (within the framework of a policy to improve coverage for industrial diseases) of a compensation fund for asbestos victims, and extended the right to asylum. A conditional amnesty for illegal immigrants was carried out, with some 75,000 obtaining legal residence as a result. Measures aimed at reintegrating the very long-term unemployed into the workforce were strengthened in 1998, and emergency groups were set up that same year in each département coordinated by the senior local representatives of the government at département level (préfets), with the objective of examining individual payments to those most in need. An overhaul of housing assistance scales was carried out, and a law on gender equality at work was introduced. This legislation removed the ban on night work for women, and introduced new regulations for this type of work, with covered all employees. A social security funding law for 2002 was passed which, amongst other measures, provided a general rise in pensions and increased paternity leave (from 3 to 11 days).

Some structural barriers to employment were removed by making it easier to combine income from work with income from social transfers. Capital incomes were taxed more heavily, while various measures were introduced which benefited lower social strata and improved their purchasing power. Employees were the sole beneficiaries of lowered welfare contributions. Welfare benefits were raised, while income tax progression was increased, with tax cuts benefiting lower-income groups more strongly than higher-groups. Lower-income sections of the population received targeted support, and almost all tax measures introduced by the Jospin Government sought to stimulate demand and reduce inequality. Between 1997 and 2002, purchasing power as a proportion of household revenue from by 16%, the biggest five-year increase in over twenty years. In addition, total government spending rose 8.9% from 1997 to 2002. Altogether, the social and economic policies implemented by the Jospin Government helped to reduce social and economic inequalities, with income inequality in terms of the Gini coefficient falling between 1997 and 2001.

Jospin was criticized by his communist partners in the government and far-left labor unions for increasing free enterprise in the country. Jospin's government released state shares in France Télécom, Air France, and Crédit Lyonnais. These sales brought in 31 billions Euros in revenue for the state Treasury. Jospin was motivated on integrating France into a growing and more interconnected and private-run European economy. Privatizations in France from 1986-2002 were found to increase competition in the French economy and innovation as companies dedicated more to research and development.

In international affairs, Jospin mostly steered clear of foreign policy, but in 2000 he denounced Hezbollah's "terrorist attacks against Israeli soldiers and civilian populations", a position markedly more pro-Israel than Chirac's. On 26 February, when Jospin visited Birzeit University, Palestinian students threw stones at him, causing him a minor injury.

=== Trotskyist affiliation ===
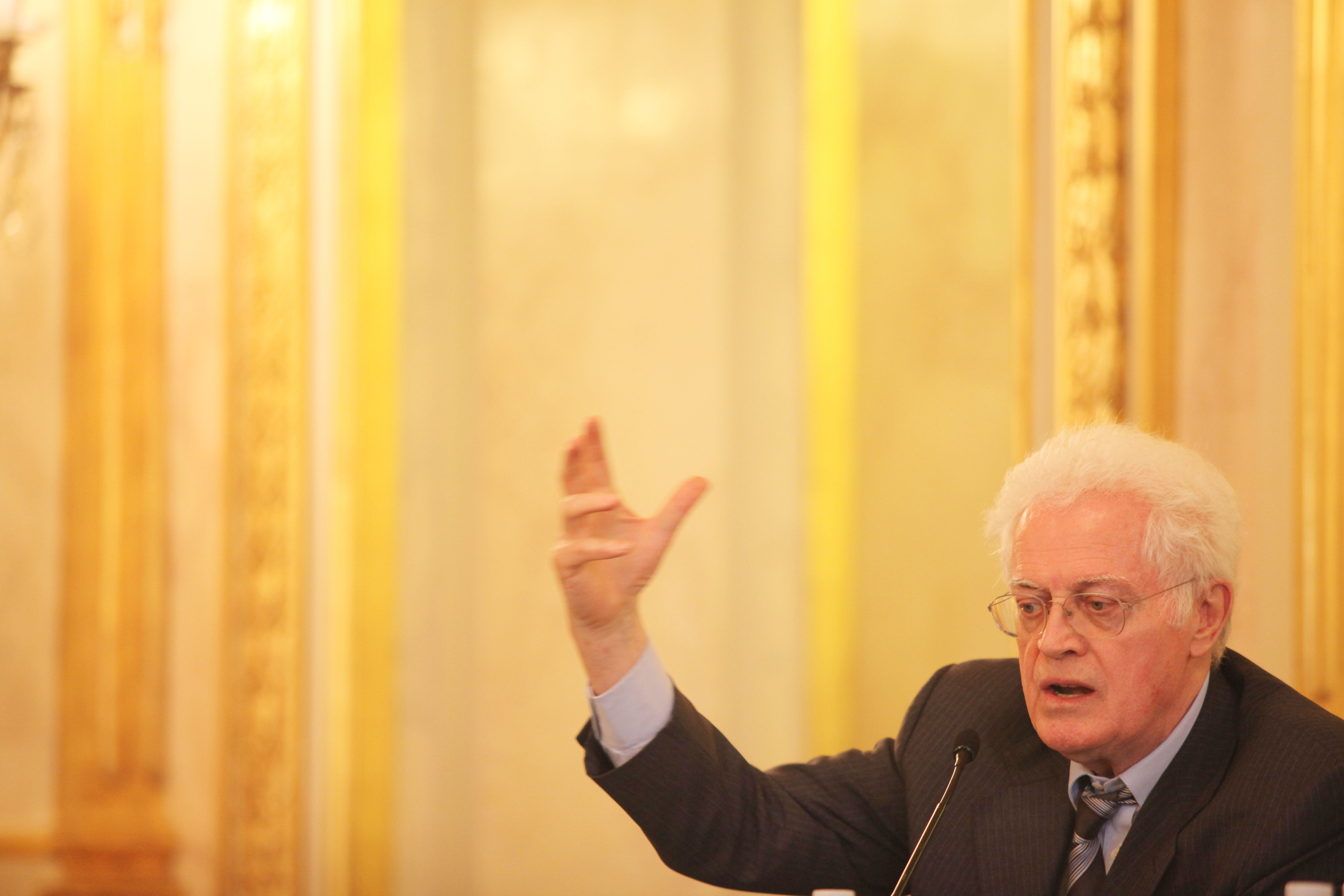
Jospin in 2009

On 5 June 2001, Jospin acknowledged before Parliament that he had maintained links with a Trotskyist formation "in the 1960s" and with Pierre Lambert's party (the Internationalist Communist Organization, OCI) after joining the Socialist Party in 1971. While studying at the ÉNA, Jospin was recruited into the OCI by Boris Fraenkel, one of the OCI's founders. He became an active member of the OCI under the pseudonym "Michel" after quitting the Ministry of Foreign Affairs in 1968. He declined to locate with precision his rupture with the Lambertists, but Le Monde alleged it was in 1986–87, a year before he became minister, while Lambert himself implicitly situated it in 1988. Jospin said he had maintained only "private relationships" with OCI members after joining the PS.

Jospin had concealed his relationship with the OCI while following a strategy of entrism into other parties, and specifically denied it when asked about it (claiming in 1995 that the rumour came from a confusion with his brother Olivier). In 2001, investigative journalists and successive revelations by former Communist associates forced him to come forward.

== Post-premiership ==
=== 2002 presidential campaign ===
Jospin was a candidate in the presidential campaign of 2002. While he appeared to have momentum in the early stages, the campaign came to be focused mainly on law-and-order issues, in which, it was argued, the government had not achieved convincing results; this coincided with a strong media focus on a number of egregious crime cases. The far left also strongly criticized Jospin for his moderate economic policies, which they contended were not markedly different from that of right-wing governments favouring businesses and free markets. Jospin's 2002 presidential manifesto was nevertheless a strongly progressive one, calling for access to housing to be made a universal right, supporting employee representation on the supervisory boards of companies, and advocating better provisions for older people and the disabled. As noted by James Sloam of Royal Holloway, University of London, Jospin's manifesto sought to balance its emphasis on "inequalities in income" with "equality of opportunity", eliminating poverty with special regard to housing whilst promoting social investment through (particularly) education.

Many left-wing candidates contested the election, gaining small percentages of the vote in the first ballot that reduced Jospin's support. As a result, Jospin finished in third place, behind Chirac and narrowly behind the Front National leader Jean-Marie Le Pen. He thus was not a candidate in the second round of voting. Following his defeat in April 2002, Jospin immediately declared he would leave politics and stepped down as prime minister. He later sporadically commented on current political affairs; for instance, he declared his opposition to same-sex marriage. In 2005, he returned to the national political scene by campaigning forcefully in favour of the proposed European Constitution. In 2006, Jospin made it known that he was available to be the Socialist candidate for the 2007 presidential election, but when Ségolène Royal became ascendant in the polls, he declined to enter the 2006 primary in order not to "divide the party".

=== Hollande presidency ===
On 14 July 2012, President François Hollande announced that Jospin would lead a commission on deontology and ethics in French political life. This commission has been criticized for being too similar to the Édouard Balladur commission Nicolas Sarkozy created on the same topic in 2007. Some Union for a Popular Movement members also criticized the participation of Roselyne Bachelot. The commission was to give its recommendations by the end of the year.

== Death ==
In January 2026, Jospin underwent a major surgical procedure and was discharged to his home in Paris a few days later. Jospin died in Paris on 22 March 2026, at the age of 88.

== Honours ==
=== National honours ===
- Grand Cross of the Legion of Honour (2015)
- Grand Cross of the National Order of Merit (1997)
- Commander of the Ordre des Palmes académiques (1988)

=== Foreign honours ===
- Officer of the National Order of Quebec (Canada, 1998)
- Knight Grand Cross of the Order of Merit of the Republic of Hungary (Hungary)
- Grand Cross of the Order of Merit of the Italian Republic (Italy, 1990)
- Grand Cordon of the Order of Ouissam Alaouite (Morocco, 1997)
- Grand Cross of the Royal Norwegian Order of Merit (Norway, 2001)
- Grand Collar of the Order of Bethlehem (Palestine, 2000)
- Grand Cross of the Order of Merit of the Republic of Poland (Poland, 2000)
- Grand Cross of the Order of Liberty (Portugal, 2005)
- Grand Cross of the Order of the Star of Romania (Romania, 1999)

== See also ==
- Politics of France
- List of prime ministers of France

Party political offices
Preceded by François Mitterrand	First Secretary of the Socialist Party; 1981–1988	Succeeded by Pierre Mauroy
Preceded by Henri Emmanuelli	First Secretary of the Socialist Party; 1995–1997	Succeeded by François Hollande
Political offices
Preceded by René Monory	Minister of National Education; 1988–1992	Succeeded by Jack Lang
Preceded by Christian Bergelin	Minister of Youth and Sport; 1988–1991	Succeeded by Frédérique Bredin
Preceded by Alain Juppé	Prime Minister of France; 1997–2002	Succeeded by Jean-Pierre Raffarin
Legal offices
Preceded by Jacques Barrot	Member of the Constitutional Council; 2015–2019	Succeeded by Alain Juppé
