= Saint-Christophe-sur-Roc =

- Commune
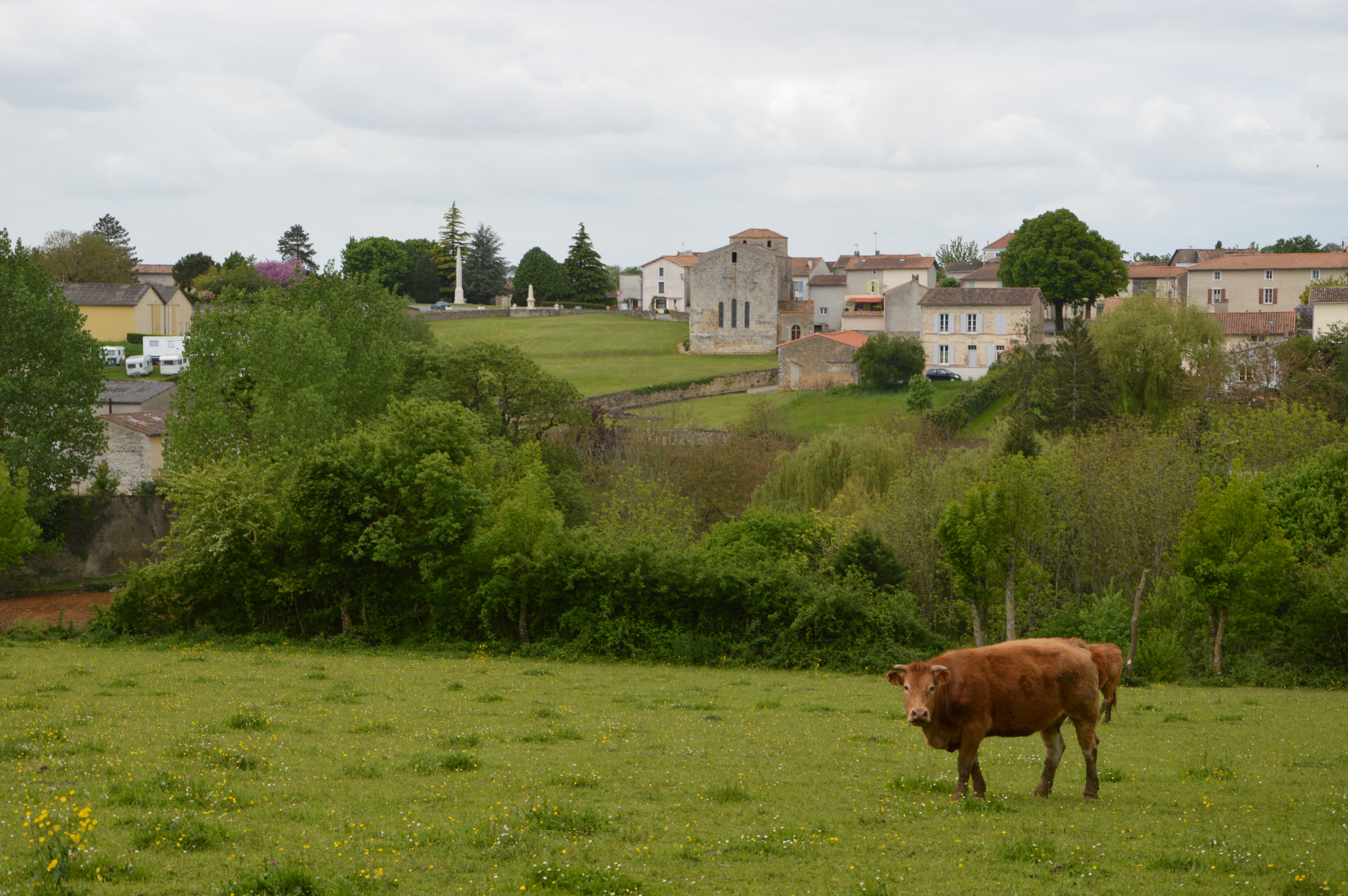
- A general view of Saint-Christophe-sur-Roc

- Coat of arms
- Location of Saint-Christophe-sur-Roc
- Location within France Location within Nouvelle-Aquitaine
- Coordinates: 46°26′53″N 0°20′48″W
- Country: France
- Region: Nouvelle-Aquitaine
- Department: Deux-Sèvres
- Arrondissement: Parthenay
- Canton: Autize-Égray

Government
  - Mayor (2020–2026): Yves Attou
- Area^{1}: 10.60 km^{2} (4.09 sq mi)
- Elevation: 105 m (344 ft)
- Highest elevation: 139 m (456 ft)
- Lowest elevation: 65 m (213 ft)
- Population (2023): 558
  - Density: 52.6/km^{2} (136/sq mi)
- Time zone: UTC+01:00 (CET)
  - Summer (DST): UTC+02:00 (CEST)
- INSEE/Postal code: 79241 /79220
- ^{1} French Land Register data, which excludes lakes, ponds, glaciers > 1 km^{2} (0.386 sq mi or 247 acres) and river estuaries.

Saint-Christophe-sur-Roc is a commune in the Deux-Sèvres department in western France.

== Geography ==
Saint-Christophe-sur-Roc is located 17 km (11 mi) North of Niort and 23 km (14 mi) Southwest of Parthenay. The commune consists of the main village Saint-Christophe-sur-Roc and a few outlying localities, including Boisne and Le Breuil. Neighboring communes are Champdeniers-Saint-Denis, Cherveux and La Chapelle-Bâton.

== Culture ==
The village is the home of the Compagnie Carabosse, famous for its fire-based installations that have visited many cities throughout Europe and beyond.

== Sites of interest ==
- An underground river flows under the village, with a length of about 5 km (3.1 mi)
- An old dairy factory dating back to 1884, registered as a monument since 2002.

== See also ==
- Communes of the Deux-Sèvres department
