= Marie-Noëlle Battistel =

French politician

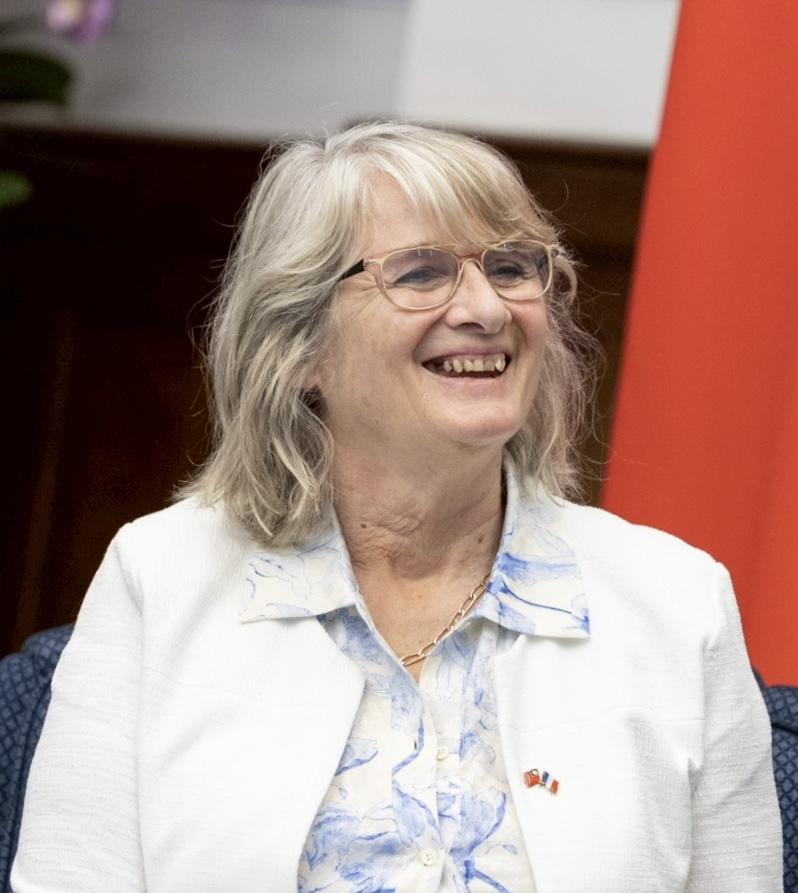

Deputy for Isère's 4th constituency in the National Assembly of France
- Incumbent
- Assumed office 6 June 2010
- Preceded by: Didier Migaud
- Parliamentary group: Socialist

Vice President, Economic Affairs Committee(fr)
- Incumbent
- Assumed office 29 June 2017
- President: Roland Lescure; Guillaume Kasbarian

Mayor of La Salle-en-Beaumont
- Incumbent
- Assumed office 19 June 1998

Personal details
- Born: 20 August 1956 (age 69)

Marie-Noëlle Battistel (French pronunciation: [maʁi nɔɛl batistɛl]; born 20 August 1956) is a French politician.

== Political career ==
Battistel was elected to the municipal council of La Salle-en-Beaumont in 1995 and became mayor three years later. She still holds this position today.

In 2007, Didier Migaud, socialist deputy of Isère's 4th constituency, asked her to be his substitute during the legislative elections.

In 2010, she was elected Regional Councillor of Rhône-Alpes on the list led by Jean-Jack Queyranne.

=== Member of the National Assembly, 2010–present ===
Following the resignation of Didier Migaud, appointed head of the Court of Auditors by Nicolas Sarkozy on 23 February 2010, Battistel was chosen by the PS to be their candidate in the by-election for his successor. On 6 June 2010, she was elected in the second round of the by-election with 58.38% of the votes cast. She was re-elected on 17 June 2012 and in the 18 June 2017 elections; in 2017, her constituency, the 4th of Isère, was the only one of this department not won by La République En Marche!

== Political positions ==
Battistel is particularly opposed to the opening to competition of hydroelectric concessions; in 2018, Contexte indicated that "she seems to have convinced many of her novice counterparts on the subject".

In 2023, Battistel publicly endorsed the re-election of the Socialist Party's chairman Olivier Faure.
