= Fenioux =

Fenioux may refer to the following places in France:

- Fenioux, Charente-Maritime, a commune in the Charente-Maritime department
- Fenioux, Deux-Sèvres, a commune in the Deux-Sèvres department
