= Isère's 4th constituency =

Constituency of the National Assembly of France

4th constituency of Isère
- inline Constituency of the National Assembly of France

- Constituency in Department

- Isère in France
- Deputy: Marie-Noëlle Battistel; PS
- Department: Isère

The 4th constituency of Isère is one of ten French legislative constituencies in the Isère département.

It was defined in 1986 to cover the then cantons of de Bourg-d'Oisans, Clelles, Corps, Fontaine-Seyssinet, Mens, Monestier-de-Clermont, La Mure, Valbonnais, Vif and Villard-de-Lans.

== Deputies ==
Election	Member	Party
1988	Didier Migaud	PS
1993	Didier Migaud	PS
1997	Didier Migaud	PS
2002	Didier Migaud	PS
2007	Didier Migaud	PS
2010 By-election	Marie-Noëlle Battistel	PS
2012	Marie-Noëlle Battistel	PS
2017	Marie-Noëlle Battistel	PS
2022	Marie-Noëlle Battistel	PS
2024	Marie-Noëlle Battistel	PS

== Election results ==
=== 2024 ===
Candidate	Party	Alliance	First round			Second round		
Candidate	Party	Alliance	Votes	%	+/–	Votes	%	+/–
Marie-Noëlle Battistel	PS	NFP	27,548	42.52	+0.30	37,148	59.92	+1.86
Anne-Marie Malandrino	LR-RN	UXD	20,812	32.12	new	24,849	40.08	new
Evelyne de Caro	MoDEM	Ensemble	7,751	11.96	-11.28			
Alexandra Veyret	LR	UDC	7,219	11.14	new			
David Babut	REC		838	1.29	-2.88			
Alain Ziegler	LO		619	0.96	+0.19			
Votes			64,787	100.00		61,997	100.00	
Valid votes			64,787	97.84	-0.73	61,997	93.72	-0.24
Blank votes			1,100	1.66	+0.57	3,358	5.08	+0.66
Null votes			329	0.50	+0.16	799	1.21	-0.41
Turnout			66,216	71.51	+20.67	66,154	71.43	+23.52
Abstentions			26,385	28.49	-20.67	26,459	28.57	-23.52
Registered voters			92,601			92,613		
Result			PS HOLD					

=== 2022 ===
Legislative Election 2022: Isère's 4th constituency
Party	Candidate	Votes	%	±%
PS (NUPÉS)	Marie-Noëlle Battistel	19,437	42.22	+5.17
LREM (Ensemble)	Fanny Lacroix	10,697	23.24	-10.09
RN	Olivier Guyot	7,618	16.55	+4.47
LC (UDC)	Michaël Kraemer	3,391	7.37	−6.61
REC	Isabelle Olivier	1,922	4.17	N/A
DVE	Josiane Hirel	1,694	3.68	N/A
Others	N/A	1,278		
Turnout		46,037	50.84	+0.78
2nd round result
PS (NUPÉS)	Marie-Noëlle Battistel	24,016	58.06	+4.05
LREM (Ensemble)	Fanny Lacroix	17,350	41.94	−4.05
Turnout		41,366	47.91	+5.31
PS hold		Swing	+4.05	

=== 2017 ===
Candidate	Label	First round		Second round	
Candidate	Label	Votes	%	Votes	%
Fabrice Hugelé	REM	14,754	33.33	15,970	45.99
Marie-Noëlle Battistel	PS	8,552	19.32	18,755	54.01
Sandrine Martin-Grand	LR	6,187	13.98		
Sandrine Pimont	FN	5,349	12.08		
Laurent Viallard	FI	4,887	11.04		
Henry Tidy	ECO	2,055	4.64		
Myriam Martin	PCF	909	2.05		
Sara Seys	DLF	647	1.46		
Françoise Colinet	DIV	351	0.79		
Jean-Alain Ziegler	EXG	281	0.63		
Jacqueline Niccolini-Darmet	DVD	194	0.44		
Yves Gérin-Mombrun	EXG	104	0.23		
Bernard Augier	DIV	0	0.00		
Votes		44,270	100.00	34,725	100.00
Valid votes		44,270	98.52	34,725	90.82
Blank votes		487	1.08	2,401	6.28
Null votes		179	0.40	1,108	2.90
Turnout		44,936	50.06	38,234	42.60
Abstentions		44,837	49.94	51,523	57.40
Registered voters		89,773		89,757	
Source: Ministry of the Interior

=== 2012 ===
2012 legislative election in Isere's 4th constituency
Candidate	Party	First round		Second round	
Candidate	Party	Votes	%	Votes	%
Marie-Noëlle Battistel	PS	21,504	41.96%	28,159	57.93%
Cécilia Durieu	UMP	14,791	28.86%	20,446	42.07%
Jeannine Latreille	FN	6,713	13.10%		
Laurent Jadeau	FG	3,328	6.49%		
Anne Parlange	EELV	2,943	5.74%		
Olivier Courade	DLR	580	1.13%		
Olivier Dodinot	Cap 21	353	0.69%		
Clément Chassaing	AEI	346	0.68%		
Philippe Bazatole	DR	244	0.48%		
Yvon Sellier	NPA	239	0.47%		
Jean-Alain Ziegler	LO	212	0.41%		
Valid votes		51,253	99.02%	48,605	97.87%
Spoilt and null votes		509	0.98%	1,060	2.13%
Votes cast / turnout		51,762	58.88%	49,665	56.47%
Abstentions		36,149	41.12%	38,279	43.53%
Registered voters		87,911	100.00%	87,944	100.00%

=== 2010 by-election ===
Following the appointment of Didier Migaud as the head of the Court of Audit, a by-election was held on Sunday, May 30 and June 6, 2010.

Candidate	Party	First round		Second round	
Candidate	Party	Votes	%	Votes	%
Marie-Noëlle Battistel	PS	9,987	39.31%	15,311	58.38%
Fabrice Marchiol	UMP & allies	8,364	32.93%	10,916	41.62%
Anne Parlange	EELV	3,208	12.63%		
Mireille d'Ornano	FN	1,881	7.40%		
Laurent Jadeau	FG	1,730	6.81%		
Arnaud Walther	PLD-AL	233	0.92%		

=== 2007 ===
Legislative Election 2007: Isère's 4th constituency
Party	Candidate	Votes	%	±%
PS	Didier Migaud	23,751	46.58	
NM	Yann Casavecchia	16,165	31.70	
MoDem	Rene Robert	3,041	5.96	
LV	Vincent Fristot	1,882	3.69	
FN	Marie-Agnès Vouriot	1,721	3.38	
Far left	Arlette Tardy	1,075	2.11	
PCF	Julien Martin	1,068	2.09	
Others	N/A	2,288		
Turnout		51,548	60.34	
2nd round result
PS	Didier Migaud	31,725	62.76	
NM	Yann Casavecchia	18,825	37.24	
Turnout		51,473	60.26	
PS hold				

=== 2002 ===
Legislative Election 2002: Isère's 4th constituency
Party	Candidate	Votes	%	±%
PS	Didier Migaud	22,631	44.51	
UMP	Francois Gilabert	9,704	19.09	
UDF	Bertrand Lachat	6,701	13.18	
FN	Monique Planche	5,193	10.21	
PCF	Francine Valeyre	1,529	3.01	
LV	Joelle Diot	1,387	2.73	
Others	N/A	3,695		
Turnout		51,519	66.17	
2nd round result
PS	Didier Migaud	27,983	60.89	
UMP	Francois Gilabert	17,974	39.11	
Turnout		47,099	60.49	
PS hold				

=== 1997 ===
Legislative Election 1997: Isère's 4th constituency
Party	Candidate	Votes	%	±%
PS	Didier Migaud	18,312	40.27	
MDR	Gérard Cardin	9,100	20.01	
FN	Béatrice Vellieux	6,865	15.10	
PCF	Michel Blonde	3,885	8.54	
LV	Gérard Leras	1,630	3.58	
DVD	Jean-François Ruchon	1,541	3.39	
LO	Roland Begot	1,210	2.66	
Others	N/A	2,929		
Turnout		47,559	64.85	
2nd round result
PS	Didier Migaud	29,630	62.98	
MDR	Gérard Cardin	17,417	37.02	
Turnout		49,777	67.87	
PS hold				
