= Jean-François Fortin =

Jean-François Fortin may refer to:

- Jean-François Fortin (ice hockey) (born 1979), Canadian ice hockey player
- Jean-François Fortin (chairman) (born 1947), French businessman
- Jean-François Fortin (politician) (born 1973), Canadian politician
