= Le Beugnon =

- Part of Beugnon-Thireuil
- Location of Le Beugnon
- Location within France Location within Nouvelle-Aquitaine
- Coordinates: 46°34′56″N 0°29′57″W
- Country: France
- Region: Nouvelle-Aquitaine
- Department: Deux-Sèvres
- Arrondissement: Parthenay
- Canton: Autize-Égray
- Commune: Beugnon-Thireuil
- Area^{1}: 16.3 km^{2} (6.3 sq mi)
- Elevation: 221 m (725 ft)
- Highest elevation: 247 m (810 ft)
- Lowest elevation: 100 m (330 ft)
- Population (2022): 288
  - Density: 17.7/km^{2} (45.8/sq mi)
- Time zone: UTC+01:00 (CET)
  - Summer (DST): UTC+02:00 (CEST)
- Postal code: 79130
- ^{1} French Land Register data, which excludes lakes, ponds, glaciers > 1 km^{2} (0.386 sq mi or 247 acres) and river estuaries.

Le Beugnon (French pronunciation: [lə bœɲɔ̃]) is a former commune in the Deux-Sèvres department in the Nouvelle-Aquitaine region in western France. On 1 January 2019, it was merged into the new commune of Beugnon-Thireuil.

== See also ==
- Communes of the Deux-Sèvres department
