= La Chapelle-Thireuil =

- Part of Beugnon-Thireuil
- Location of La Chapelle-Thireuil
- Location within France Location within Nouvelle-Aquitaine
- Coordinates: 46°33′32″N 0°33′18″W
- Country: France
- Region: Nouvelle-Aquitaine
- Department: Deux-Sèvres
- Arrondissement: Parthenay
- Canton: Autize-Égray
- Commune: Beugnon-Thireuil
- Area^{1}: 17.12 km^{2} (6.61 sq mi)
- Elevation: 150 m (490 ft)
- Highest elevation: 153 m (502 ft)
- Lowest elevation: 68 m (223 ft)
- Population (2022): 448
  - Density: 26.2/km^{2} (67.8/sq mi)
- Time zone: UTC+01:00 (CET)
  - Summer (DST): UTC+02:00 (CEST)
- Postal code: 79160
- ^{1} French Land Register data, which excludes lakes, ponds, glaciers > 1 km^{2} (0.386 sq mi or 247 acres) and river estuaries.

La Chapelle-Thireuil (French pronunciation: [la ʃapɛl tiʁœj]) is a former commune in the Deux-Sèvres department in the Nouvelle-Aquitaine region in western France. On 1 January 2019, it was merged into the new commune of Beugnon-Thireuil.

== See also ==
- Communes of the Deux-Sèvres department
