= Marie-France Garaud =

French politician (1934–2024)

Member of the European Parliament for France
- In office 20 July 1999 – 19 July 2004

Personal details
- Born: Marie-France Quintard; 6 March 1934 Poitiers, France
- Died: 22 May 2024 (aged 90) Saint-Pompain, Deux-Sèvres, France
- Party: RPR
- Spouse: Louis Garaud
- Children: 2
- Education: University of Poitiers

Marie-France Garaud (French: [maʁi fʁɑ̃s gaʁo]; 6 March 1934 – 22 May 2024) was a French politician.

== Life and career ==
Marie-France Garaud was a private adviser to President Pompidou and Jacques Chirac during his first time as Prime Minister. In the 1970s, she was considered to be the most influential woman in France. She ran in the 1981 French presidential election and sat at the European Parliament from 1999 to 2004, elected on the list of Charles Pasqua and Philippe de Villiers. She died on 22 May 2024, at the age of 90.

Marie-France Garaud voted "no" in the French Maastricht Treaty referendum and in the 2005 French European Constitution referendum.

Garaud died on 22 May 2024 in Saint-Pompain at the age of 90.

== Books ==
- Garaud, Marie-France; Séguin, Philippe (1992). De l'Europe en général et de la France en particulier. Paris: Pré aux Clercs. ISBN 978-2714428998.
- Garaud, Marie-France (1992). Maastricht, pourquoi non. Paris: Plon. ISBN 9782259025614. OCLC 28425584.
- Garaud, Marie-France (2006). La Fête des fous : Qui a tué la Ve République ?. Paris: Plon. ISBN 9782259202596. OCLC 421297239.
- Garaud, Marie-France (2010). Impostures politiques. Paris: Plon. ISBN 9782259212540. OCLC 706029043.
