= Franck Robine =

French civil servant (born 1967)

Prefect of Martinique
- In office 29 June 2017 – 15 January 2020
- Preceded by: Fabrice Rigoulet-Roze
- Succeeded by: Stanislas Cazelles

Personal details
- Born: 25 June 1967 (age 58)
- Spouse: Catherine Séguin
- Relatives: Philippe Séguin (father-in-law)

Franck Roger Louis Robine (born 25 June 1967) is a French civil servant who has been serving as chief of staff to interior minister Bruno Retailleau since 2024. From 2022 to 2024, he served as prefect of Bourgogne-Franche-Comté. From January to July 2020, he served as prefect of Corsica. From 2017 to 2020, he served as prefect of Martinique. From 2007 to 2012, he served as chef de cabinet to prime minister François Fillon.
