= Beugnon-Thireuil =

- Commune
- Location of Beugnon-Thireuil
- Location within France Location within Nouvelle-Aquitaine
- Coordinates: 46°33′32″N 0°33′18″W
- Country: France
- Region: Nouvelle-Aquitaine
- Department: Deux-Sèvres
- Arrondissement: Parthenay
- Canton: Autize-Égray
- Intercommunality: Val-de-Gâtine

Government
  - Mayor (2020–2026): Denis Onillon
- Area^{1}: 33.42 km^{2} (12.90 sq mi)
- Elevation: 150 m (490 ft)
- Highest elevation: 247 m (810 ft)
- Lowest elevation: 68 m (223 ft)
- Population (2023): 735
  - Density: 22.0/km^{2} (57.0/sq mi)
- Time zone: UTC+01:00 (CET)
  - Summer (DST): UTC+02:00 (CEST)
- INSEE/Postal code: 79077 /79130, 79160
- ^{1} French Land Register data, which excludes lakes, ponds, glaciers > 1 km^{2} (0.386 sq mi or 247 acres) and river estuaries.

Beugnon-Thireuil (French pronunciation: [bœɲɔ̃ tiʁœj]) is a commune in the Deux-Sèvres department in the Nouvelle-Aquitaine region in western France. It is the result of the merger, on 1 January 2019, of the communes of Le Beugnon and La Chapelle-Thireuil.

== See also ==
- Communes of the Deux-Sèvres department
