= Catherine Séguin =

French civil servant (born 1970)

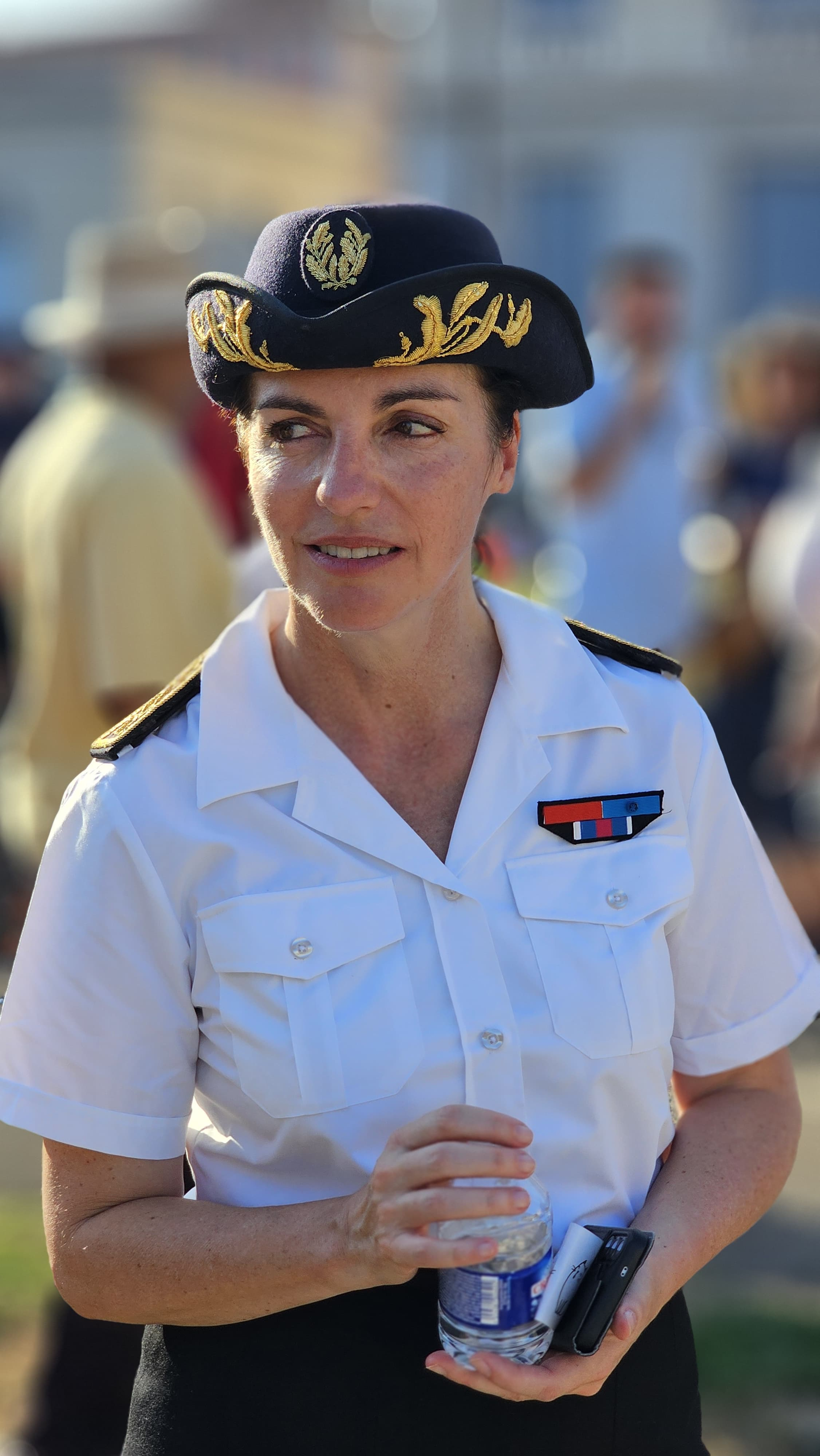

Prefect of Isère
- Incumbent
- Assumed office 25 November 2024
- Preceded by: Louis Laugier

Personal details
- Born: 27 February 1970 (age 56)
- Spouse: Franck Robine
- Parent: Philippe Séguin (father)

Catherine Séguin (born 27 February 1970) is a French civil servant who has been serving as prefect of Isère since 2024. From 2023 to 2024, she served as prefect of Oise. From 2020 to 2023, she served as prefect of Loire. From 2018 to 2020, she served as prefect of Gers. She is the daughter of Philippe Séguin and the wife of Franck Robine.
