= Surin, Deux-Sèvres =

Surin
- Commune
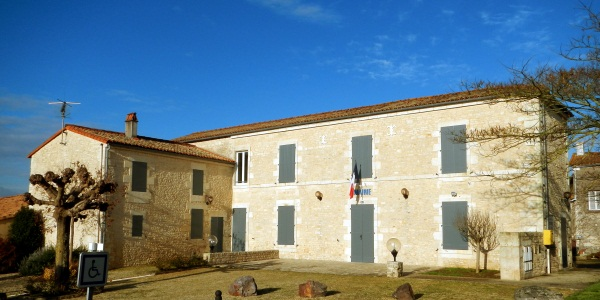
- Town hall
- Location of Surin
- Location within France Location within Nouvelle-Aquitaine
- Coordinates: 46°27′41″N 0°27′45″W
- Country: France
- Region: Nouvelle-Aquitaine
- Department: Deux-Sèvres
- Arrondissement: Parthenay
- Canton: Autize-Égray

Government
  - Mayor (2020–2026): Philippe Jeannot
- Area^{1}: 13.61 km^{2} (5.25 sq mi)
- Elevation: 120 m (390 ft)
- Highest elevation: 137 m (449 ft)
- Lowest elevation: 44 m (144 ft)
- Population (2023): 635
  - Density: 46.7/km^{2} (121/sq mi)
- Time zone: UTC+01:00 (CET)
  - Summer (DST): UTC+02:00 (CEST)
- INSEE/Postal code: 79320 /79220
- ^{1} French Land Register data, which excludes lakes, ponds, glaciers > 1 km^{2} (0.386 sq mi or 247 acres) and river estuaries.

Surin (French pronunciation: [syʁɛ̃]) is a commune in the Deux-Sèvres department in western France.

== Climate ==
On average, Surin experiences 31.8 days per year with a minimum temperature below 0 °C (32.0 °F), 0.2 days per year with a minimum temperature below −10 °C (14.0 °F), 2.1 days per year with a maximum temperature below 0 °C (32.0 °F), and 19.8 days per year with a maximum temperature above 30 °C (86.0 °F). The record high temperature was 44.3 °C (111.7 °F) on June 23, 2026, while the record low temperature was −10.6 °C (12.9 °F) on February 9, 2012.

Climate data for Surin (1991–2020 normals, extremes 2009–present)
Month	Jan	Feb	Mar	Apr	May	Jun	Jul	Aug	Sep	Oct	Nov	Dec	Year
Record high °C (°F)	16.4 (61.5)	23.8 (74.8)	25.4 (77.7)	29.2 (84.6)	37.2 (99.0)	44.3 (111.7)	40.8 (105.4)	40.3 (104.5)	36.5 (97.7)	31.2 (88.2)	22.9 (73.2)	17.5 (63.5)	44.3 (111.7)
Mean daily maximum °C (°F)	8.8 (47.8)	10.2 (50.4)	13.8 (56.8)	16.8 (62.2)	20.6 (69.1)	24.2 (75.6)	26.2 (79.2)	26.7 (80.1)	23.1 (73.6)	18.0 (64.4)	12.6 (54.7)	9.4 (48.9)	17.5 (63.6)
Daily mean °C (°F)	5.8 (42.4)	6.3 (43.3)	9.2 (48.6)	11.6 (52.9)	15.1 (59.2)	18.5 (65.3)	20.6 (69.1)	20.6 (69.1)	17.6 (63.7)	13.8 (56.8)	9.1 (48.4)	6.3 (43.3)	12.9 (55.2)
Mean daily minimum °C (°F)	2.8 (37.0)	2.4 (36.3)	4.5 (40.1)	6.3 (43.3)	9.7 (49.5)	12.8 (55.0)	14.5 (58.1)	14.6 (58.3)	12.0 (53.6)	9.5 (49.1)	5.6 (42.1)	3.2 (37.8)	8.2 (46.7)
Record low °C (°F)	−7.6 (18.3)	−10.6 (12.9)	−3.3 (26.1)	−2.2 (28.0)	1.1 (34.0)	4.5 (40.1)	8.0 (46.4)	7.5 (45.5)	4.2 (39.6)	0.4 (32.7)	−2.9 (26.8)	−7.5 (18.5)	−10.6 (12.9)
Average precipitation mm (inches)	99.3 (3.91)	75.3 (2.96)	72.8 (2.87)	69.5 (2.74)	68.5 (2.70)	55.6 (2.19)	58.1 (2.29)	56.4 (2.22)	69.5 (2.74)	96.7 (3.81)	101.4 (3.99)	113.4 (4.46)	936.5 (36.88)
Average precipitation days (≥ 1.0 mm)	13.3	11.7	10.9	10.3	10.8	8.5	8.1	7.2	8.2	12.0	12.8	13.7	127.5
Source: Meteociel

== See also ==
- Communes of the Deux-Sèvres department
