= Saint-Maxire =

- Commune
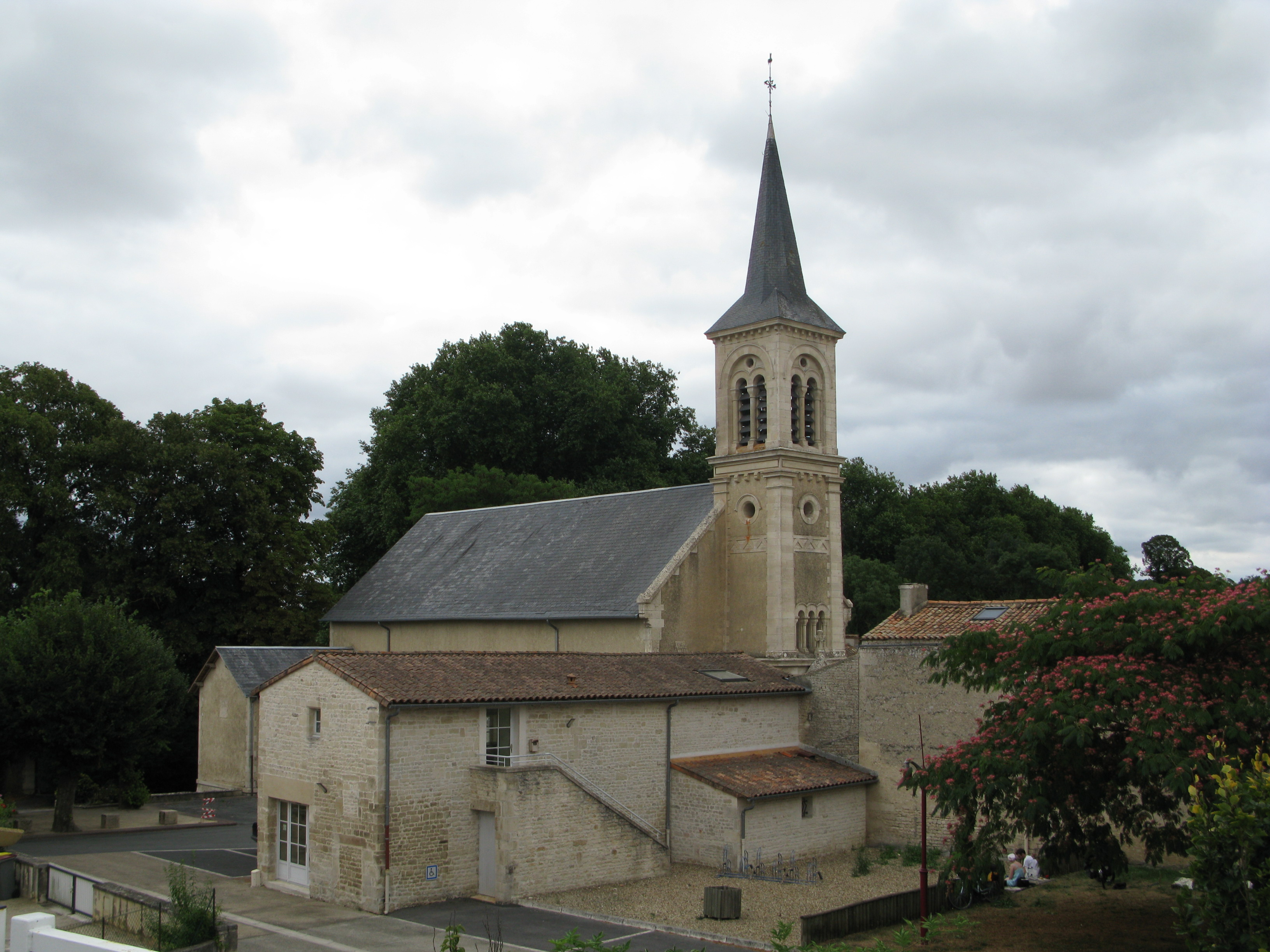
- The church in Saint-Maxire

- Coat of arms
- Location of Saint-Maxire
- Location within France Location within Nouvelle-Aquitaine
- Coordinates: 46°24′01″N 0°28′38″W
- Country: France
- Region: Nouvelle-Aquitaine
- Department: Deux-Sèvres
- Arrondissement: Niort
- Canton: Autize-Égray
- Intercommunality: CA Niortais

Government
  - Mayor (2020–2026): Christian Brémaud
- Area^{1}: 14.41 km^{2} (5.56 sq mi)
- Elevation: 60 m (200 ft)
- Highest elevation: 66 m (217 ft)
- Lowest elevation: 16 m (52 ft)
- Population (2023): 1,319
  - Density: 91.53/km^{2} (237.1/sq mi)
- Time zone: UTC+01:00 (CET)
  - Summer (DST): UTC+02:00 (CEST)
- INSEE/Postal code: 79281 /79410
- ^{1} French Land Register data, which excludes lakes, ponds, glaciers > 1 km^{2} (0.386 sq mi or 247 acres) and river estuaries.

Saint-Maxire (French pronunciation: [sɛ̃ maksiʁ]) is a commune in the Deux-Sèvres department in western France.

== See also ==
- Communes of the Deux-Sèvres department
