= Villiers-en-Plaine =

- Commune
- Location of Villiers-en-Plaine
- Location within France Location within Nouvelle-Aquitaine
- Coordinates: 46°24′32″N 0°32′10″W
- Country: France
- Region: Nouvelle-Aquitaine
- Department: Deux-Sèvres
- Arrondissement: Niort
- Canton: Autize-Égray
- Intercommunality: CA Niortais

Government
  - Mayor (2020–2026): Lucy Moreau
- Area^{1}: 27.89 km^{2} (10.77 sq mi)
- Elevation: 38 m (125 ft)
- Highest elevation: 84 m (276 ft)
- Lowest elevation: 29 m (95 ft)
- Population (2023): 1,806
  - Density: 64.75/km^{2} (167.7/sq mi)
- Time zone: UTC+01:00 (CET)
  - Summer (DST): UTC+02:00 (CEST)
- INSEE/Postal code: 79351 /79160
- ^{1} French Land Register data, which excludes lakes, ponds, glaciers > 1 km^{2} (0.386 sq mi or 247 acres) and river estuaries.

Villiers-en-Plaine (French pronunciation: [vilje ɑ̃ plɛn]) is a commune in the Deux-Sèvres department in western France.

== Demographic evolution ==
Historical population
| Year | Pop. | ±% p.a. |
|---|---|---|
| 1968 | 996 | — |
| 1975 | 979 | −0.25% |
| 1982 | 1,079 | +1.40% |
| 1990 | 1,153 | +0.83% |
| 1999 | 1,285 | +1.21% |
| 2007 | 1,555 | +2.41% |
| 2012 | 1,734 | +2.20% |
| 2017 | 1,774 | +0.46% |
| 2023 | 1,806 | +0.30% |
Source: INSEE

== See also ==
- Communes of the Deux-Sèvres department
