= Didier Migaud =

French politician (born 1952)

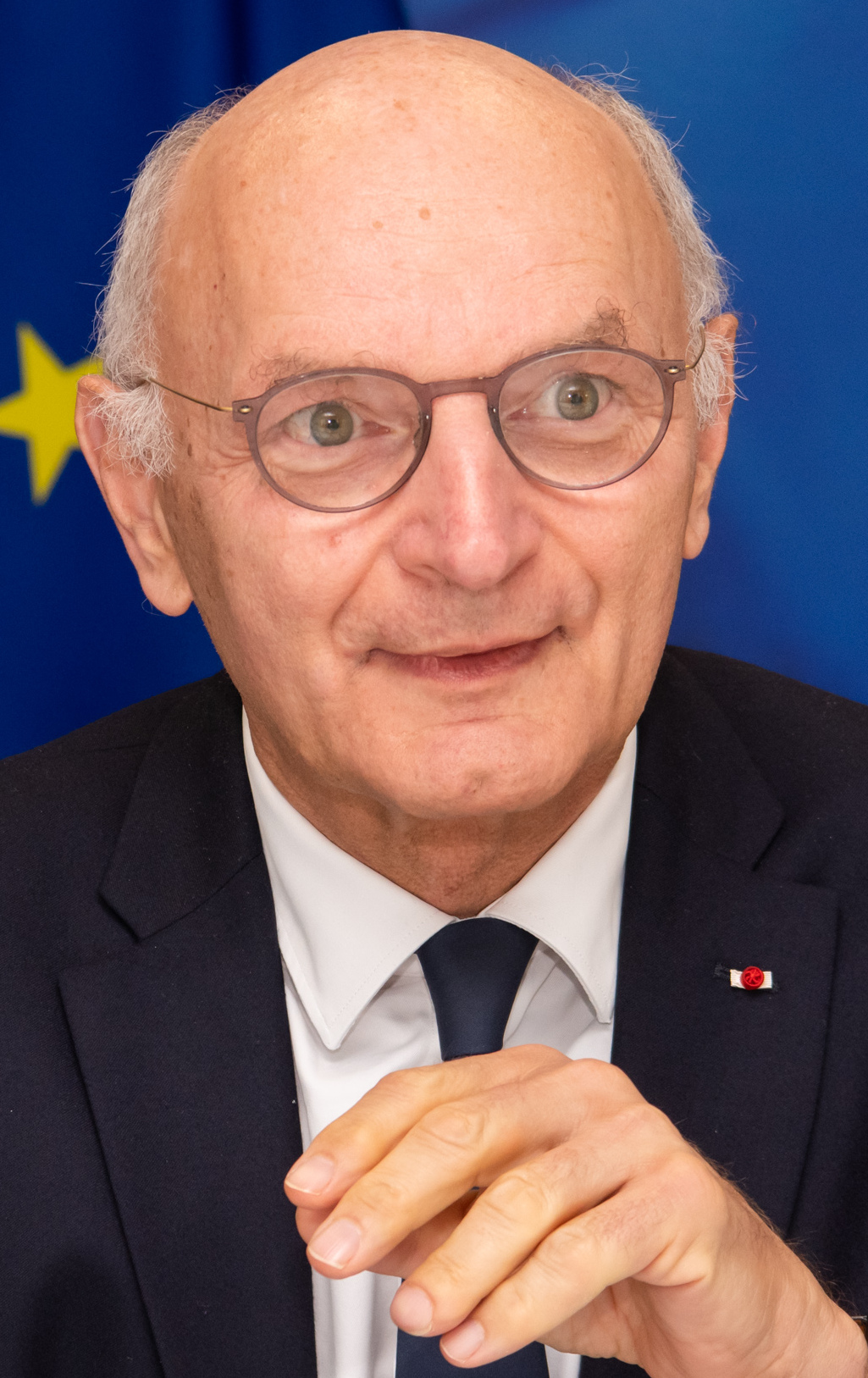
- Migaud in 2023

Keeper of the Seals, Minister of Justice
- In office 21 September 2024 – 23 December 2024
- Prime Minister: Michel Barnier
- Preceded by: Éric Dupond-Moretti
- Succeeded by: Gérald Darmanin

President of the HATVP
- In office 31 January 2020 – 24 September 2024
- Preceded by: Jean-Louis Nadal
- Succeeded by: Patrick Matet

First President of the Cour des Comptes
- In office 23 February 2010 – 31 January 2020
- Preceded by: Philippe Séguin
- Succeeded by: Pierre Moscovici

Member of the National Assembly for Isère's 4th constituency
- In office 23 June 1988 – 1 March 2010
- Preceded by: Proportional representation per department
- Succeeded by: Marie-Noëlle Battistel

Regional Councillor of Rhône-Alpes
- In office 17 March 1986 – 15 October 1988
- President: Charles Millon

Personal details
- Born: 6 June 1952 (age 74) Tours, France
- Party: Independent (2010–present)
- Other political affiliations: PS (until 2010)
- Education: Sciences Po Lyon
- Occupation: Jurist • Politician

Didier Migaud (French pronunciation: [didje miɡo]; born 6 June 1952) is a French jurist and politician who served as president of the French Cour des comptes from 2010 to 2020 and as member of the National Assembly of France from 1988 to 2010. From September to December 2024, he briefly served as Minister of Justice in the government of Prime Minister Michel Barnier.

== Political career ==
Migaud represented Isère's 4th constituency in the National Assembly of France from 1988 to 2010 as a member of the New Left group.

In February 2010, Migaud was nominated as the First president (equivalent to Chief Baron) of the Cour des comptes which was left vacant after the death of Philippe Séguin.

On 31 January 2020, Migaud was appointed president of the High Authority for the transparency of public life (HAVP).

Legal offices
Preceded by Philippe Séguin	First President of the Court of Audit; 2010–2020	Succeeded by Pierre Moscovici
Political offices
Preceded by Éric Dupond-Moretti	Keeper of the Seals, Minister of Justice; 21 September 2024 – 23 December 2024	Succeeded by Gérald Darmanin
