= Jean-François Fortin (businessman) =

French businessman

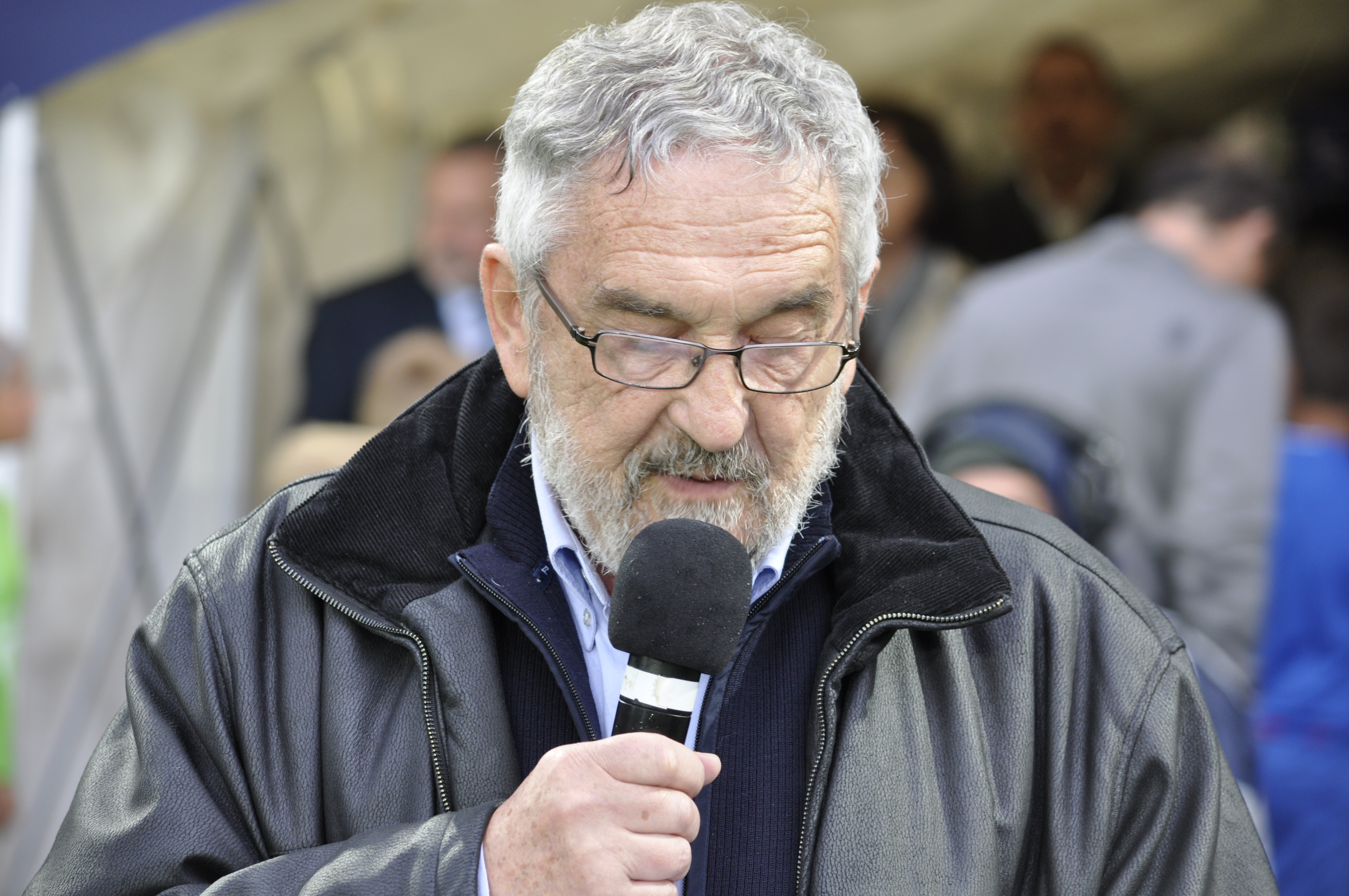
- Born: 12 January 1947 (age 79); Coulonges-sur-l'Autize, France
- Occupation: President SM Caen (2002-18)
- Predecessor: Guy Chambily
- Successor: Gilles Sergent

Jean-François Fortin (born 12 January 1947 in Coulonges-sur-l'Autize) is a French businessman.

CEO of the company Maîtres laitiers du Cotentin, he was also the chairman of SM Caen, a football club which accessed the French Ligue 1 under his management.

He was made a Chevalier of the Légion d'honneur in 2002.

He was investigated for "pact of corruption" based on a leaked call that sounded like a verbal deal with Jean-Marc Conrad, president of the Nîmes football club, right before the 2014 Caen-Nîmes match took place. He was relaxed in 2020. Contested for many years, and after a failed attempt to buy the club's majority shares, he was ousted by the board of SM Caen in May 2018, after 17 years in position.
