= Ardin, Deux-Sèvres =

Ardin
- Commune
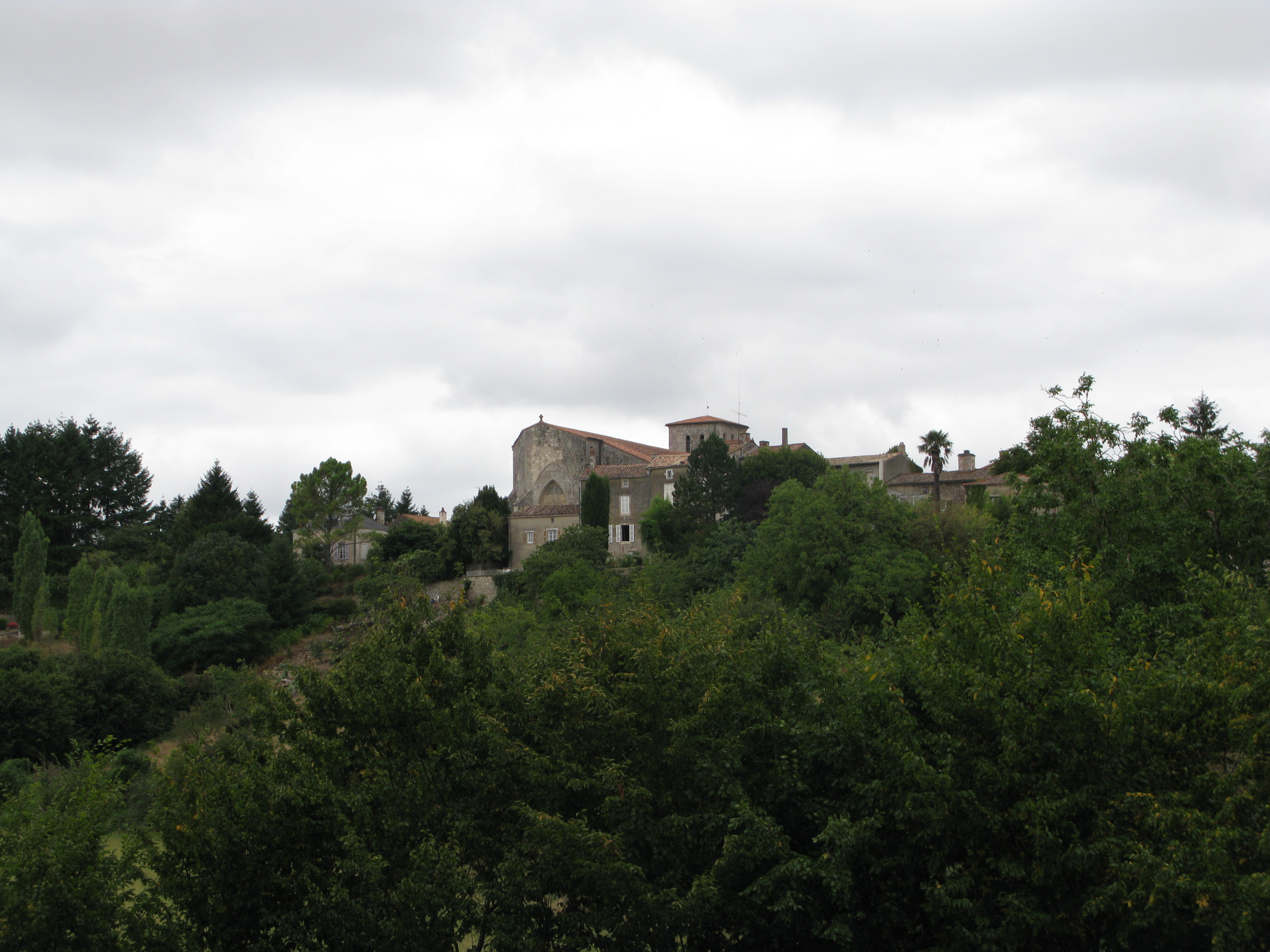
- A general view of Ardin

- Coat of arms
- Location of Ardin
- Location within France Location within Nouvelle-Aquitaine
- Coordinates: 46°28′31″N 0°33′23″W
- Country: France
- Region: Nouvelle-Aquitaine
- Department: Deux-Sèvres
- Arrondissement: Parthenay
- Canton: Autize-Égray

Government
  - Mayor (2020–2026): Jean-Pierre Rimbeau
- Area^{1}: 29.59 km^{2} (11.42 sq mi)
- Elevation: 63 m (207 ft)
- Highest elevation: 141 m (463 ft)
- Lowest elevation: 30 m (98 ft)
- Population (2023): 1,257
  - Density: 42.48/km^{2} (110.0/sq mi)
- Time zone: UTC+01:00 (CET)
  - Summer (DST): UTC+02:00 (CEST)
- INSEE/Postal code: 79012 /79160
- ^{1} French Land Register data, which excludes lakes, ponds, glaciers > 1 km^{2} (0.386 sq mi or 247 acres) and river estuaries.

Ardin (French pronunciation: [aʁdɛ̃]) is a commune in the Deux-Sèvres department in the Nouvelle-Aquitaine region in western France.

== See also ==
- Communes of the Deux-Sèvres department
