= Cours, Deux-Sèvres =

Cours
- Commune
- Location of Cours
- Location within France Location within Nouvelle-Aquitaine
- Coordinates: 46°29′51″N 0°24′44″W
- Country: France
- Region: Nouvelle-Aquitaine
- Department: Deux-Sèvres
- Arrondissement: Parthenay
- Canton: Autize-Égray

Government
  - Mayor (2025–2026): Emmanuel Demougeot
- Area^{1}: 14.92 km^{2} (5.76 sq mi)
- Elevation: 102 m (335 ft)
- Highest elevation: 169 m (554 ft)
- Lowest elevation: 63 m (207 ft)
- Population (2023): 521
  - Density: 34.9/km^{2} (90.4/sq mi)
- Time zone: UTC+01:00 (CET)
  - Summer (DST): UTC+02:00 (CEST)
- INSEE/Postal code: 79104 /79220
- ^{1} French Land Register data, which excludes lakes, ponds, glaciers > 1 km^{2} (0.386 sq mi or 247 acres) and river estuaries.

Cours is a commune in the Deux-Sèvres department in the Nouvelle-Aquitaine region in western France.

== See also ==
- Communes of the Deux-Sèvres department
