= Georgina Dufoix =

French politician

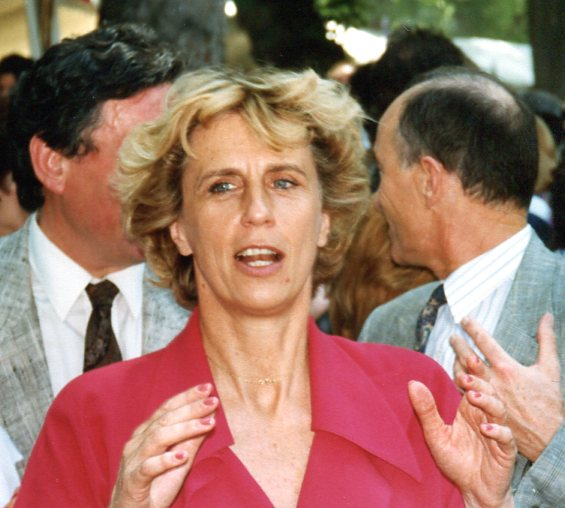
- Dufoix in 1990

Minister of Social Affairs and National Solidarity
- In office 1984–1986
- President: François Mitterrand
- Prime Minister: Laurent Fabius
- Preceded by: Pierre Bérégovoy
- Succeeded by: Philippe Séguin

Personal details
- Born: Georgina Nègre; 16 February 1942 (age 84) Paris, France
- Party: Socialist Party
- Education: Paris 1 Panthéon-Sorbonne University

Georgina Dufoix (French pronunciation: [ʒɔʁʒina dyfwa]; born Georgina Nègre on 16 February 1942) is a French politician, who served as Minister of Social Affairs and National Solidarity from 1984 to 1986, in the government of Laurent Fabius.
