= Scillé =

- Commune
- Location of Scillé
- Location within France Location within Nouvelle-Aquitaine
- Coordinates: 46°36′02″N 0°33′27″W
- Country: France
- Region: Nouvelle-Aquitaine
- Department: Deux-Sèvres
- Arrondissement: Parthenay
- Canton: Autize-Égray

Government
  - Mayor (2020–2026): Sandrine Bechy
- Area^{1}: 11.43 km^{2} (4.41 sq mi)
- Elevation: 206 m (676 ft)
- Highest elevation: 261 m (856 ft)
- Lowest elevation: 113 m (371 ft)
- Population (2023): 365
  - Density: 31.9/km^{2} (82.7/sq mi)
- Time zone: UTC+01:00 (CET)
  - Summer (DST): UTC+02:00 (CEST)
- INSEE/Postal code: 79309 /79240
- ^{1} French Land Register data, which excludes lakes, ponds, glaciers > 1 km^{2} (0.386 sq mi or 247 acres) and river estuaries.

Scillé is a commune in the Deux-Sèvres department in western France.

== See also ==
- Communes of the Deux-Sèvres department
