= Sciecq =

- Commune
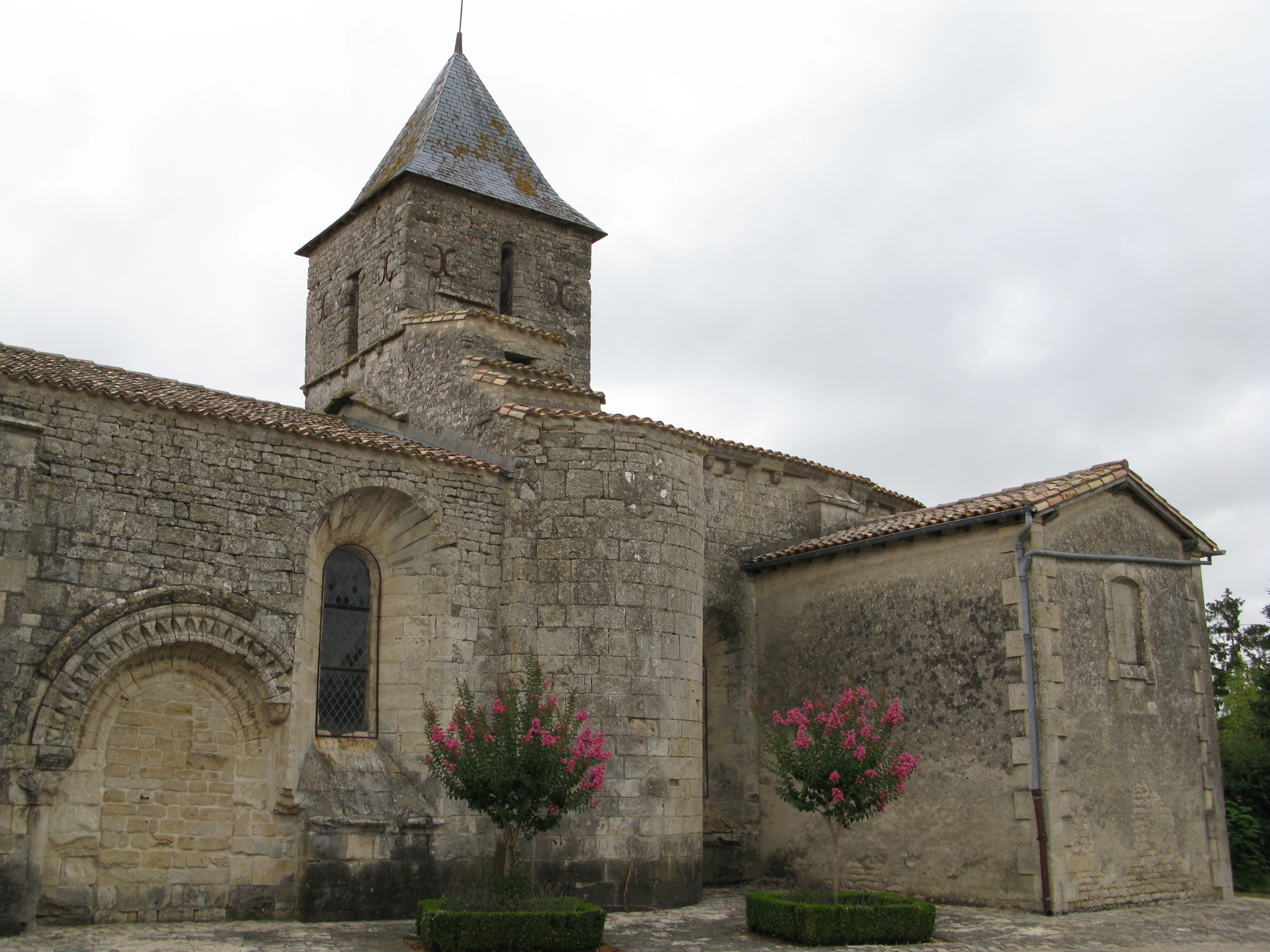
- The church in Sciecq
- Location of Sciecq
- Location within France Location within Nouvelle-Aquitaine
- Coordinates: 46°22′27″N 0°28′10″W
- Country: France
- Region: Nouvelle-Aquitaine
- Department: Deux-Sèvres
- Arrondissement: Niort
- Canton: Autize-Égray
- Intercommunality: CA Niortais

Government
  - Mayor (2020–2026): Jean-Michel Beaudic
- Area^{1}: 4.33 km^{2} (1.67 sq mi)
- Elevation: 54 m (177 ft)
- Highest elevation: 72 m (236 ft)
- Lowest elevation: 12 m (39 ft)
- Population (2023): 659
  - Density: 152/km^{2} (394/sq mi)
- Time zone: UTC+01:00 (CET)
  - Summer (DST): UTC+02:00 (CEST)
- INSEE/Postal code: 79308 /79000
- ^{1} French Land Register data, which excludes lakes, ponds, glaciers > 1 km^{2} (0.386 sq mi or 247 acres) and river estuaries.

Sciecq (French pronunciation: [sjɛk]) is a commune in the Deux-Sèvres department in western France.

== See also ==
- Communes of the Deux-Sèvres department
