= Saint-Rémy, Deux-Sèvres =

Saint-Rémy
- Commune
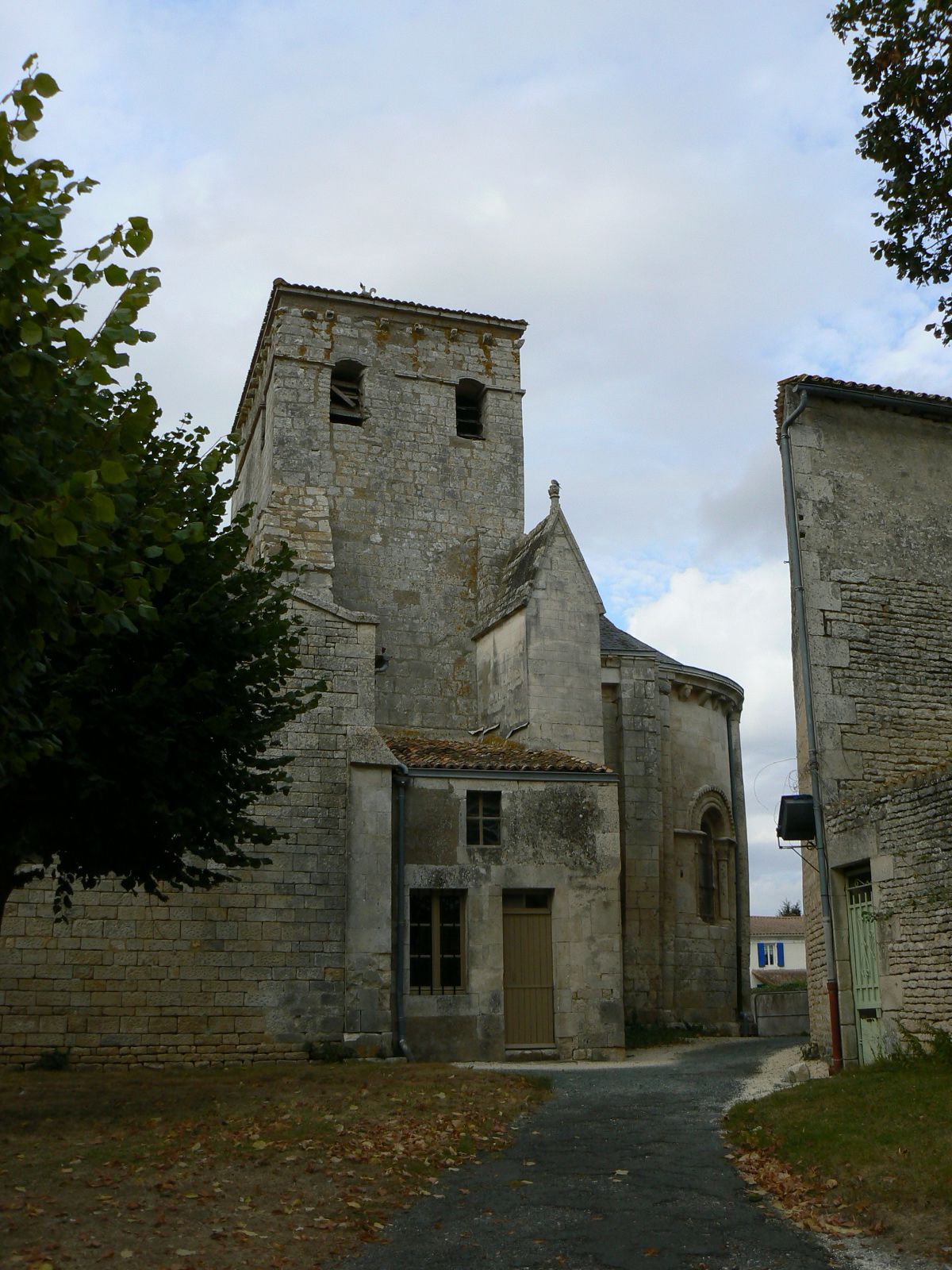
- The church in Saint-Rémy
- Location of Saint-Rémy
- Location within France Location within Nouvelle-Aquitaine
- Coordinates: 46°22′16″N 0°31′32″W
- Country: France
- Region: Nouvelle-Aquitaine
- Department: Deux-Sèvres
- Arrondissement: Niort
- Canton: Autize-Égray
- Intercommunality: CA Niortais

Government
  - Mayor (2020–2026): Elisabeth Maillard
- Area^{1}: 13.64 km^{2} (5.27 sq mi)
- Elevation: 80 m (260 ft)
- Highest elevation: 87 m (285 ft)
- Lowest elevation: 38 m (125 ft)
- Population (2023): 1,105
  - Density: 81.01/km^{2} (209.8/sq mi)
- Time zone: UTC+01:00 (CET)
  - Summer (DST): UTC+02:00 (CEST)
- INSEE/Postal code: 79293 /79410
- ^{1} French Land Register data, which excludes lakes, ponds, glaciers > 1 km^{2} (0.386 sq mi or 247 acres) and river estuaries.

Saint-Rémy (French pronunciation: [sɛ̃ ʁemi]) is a commune in the Deux-Sèvres department in western France.

== See also ==
- Communes of the Deux-Sèvres department
