= Saint-Pompain =

- Commune
- Location of Saint-Pompain
- Location within France Location within Nouvelle-Aquitaine
- Coordinates: 46°26′32″N 0°35′56″W
- Country: France
- Region: Nouvelle-Aquitaine
- Department: Deux-Sèvres
- Arrondissement: Parthenay
- Canton: Autize-Égray

Government
  - Mayor (2020–2026): Christiane Bailly
- Area^{1}: 24.28 km^{2} (9.37 sq mi)
- Elevation: 65 m (213 ft)
- Highest elevation: 73 m (240 ft)
- Lowest elevation: 22 m (72 ft)
- Population (2023): 949
  - Density: 39.1/km^{2} (101/sq mi)
- Time zone: UTC+01:00 (CET)
  - Summer (DST): UTC+02:00 (CEST)
- INSEE/Postal code: 79290 /79160
- ^{1} French Land Register data, which excludes lakes, ponds, glaciers > 1 km^{2} (0.386 sq mi or 247 acres) and river estuaries.

Saint-Pompain (French pronunciation: [sɛ̃ pɔ̃pɛ̃]) is a commune in the Deux-Sèvres department in western France.

== See also ==
- Communes of the Deux-Sèvres department
