= Philippe Séguin =

French politician (1943–2010)

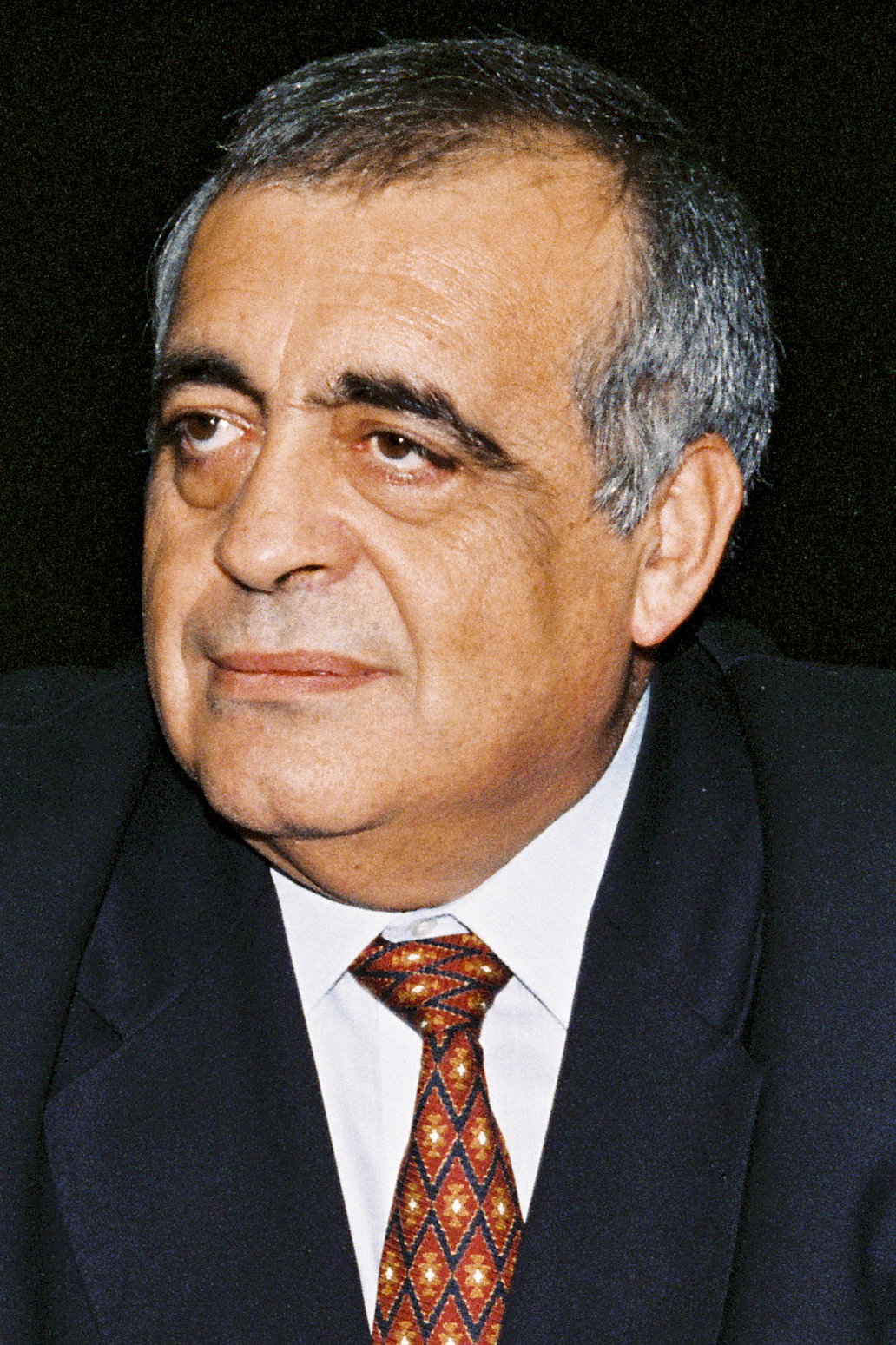
- Séguin in 1997

First President of the Court of Audit
- In office 21 July 2004 – 7 January 2010
- Preceded by: François Logerot
- Succeeded by: Didier Migaud

President of the National Assembly
- In office 2 April 1993 – 12 June 1997
- Preceded by: Henri Emmanuelli
- Succeeded by: Laurent Fabius

President of Rally for the Republic
- In office 6 July 1997 – 16 April 1999
- Preceded by: Alain Juppé
- Succeeded by: Michèle Alliot-Marie

Minister for Social Affairs and Employment
- In office 20 March 1986 – 12 May 1988
- Prime Minister: Jacques Chirac
- Preceded by: Georgina Dufoix
- Succeeded by: Michel Delebarre

Member of the National Assembly for Vosges's 1st constituency
- In office 19 March 1978 – 1 April 1986
- In office 12 June 1988 – 18 June 2002

Mayor of Épinal
- In office 18 March 1983 – 9 November 1997
- Preceded by: Pierre Blanck
- Succeeded by: Michel Heinrich

Personal details
- Born: 21 April 1943 Tunis, Tunisia
- Died: 7 January 2010 (aged 66) Paris, France
- Party: Union for the New Republic (1958–1968); Union of Democrats for the Republic (1968–1976); Rally for the Republic (1976–1999)
- Children: Catherine Séguin
- Relatives: Franck Robine (son-in-law)
- Education: Sciences Po Aix, ÉNA

Philippe Séguin (French pronunciation: [filip seɡɛ̃]; 21 April 1943 – 7 January 2010) was a French political figure who was President of the National Assembly from 1993 to 1997 and President of the Cour des Comptes of France from 2004 to 2010.

He entered the Court of Financial Auditors in 1970, but he began a political career in the Neo-Gaullist party RPR. In 1978, he was elected to the National Assembly as a deputy for the Vosges département. He was Mayor of Épinal between 1983 and 1997.

Representing the social tradition of Gaullism, he was Minister of Social Affairs in Jacques Chirac's cabinet, from 1986 to 1988. After Chirac's defeat at the 1988 presidential election, he allied with Charles Pasqua and criticized the abandonment of Gaullist doctrine by the RPR executive. He accused Alain Juppé and Édouard Balladur of wanting an alignment on liberal and pro-European policies.

In 1992, he played a leading role in the No campaign against the Maastricht Treaty. On the eve of the vote he opposed President François Mitterrand in a televised debate.

As president of the National Assembly from 1993 to 1997, he supported the winning candidacy of Jacques Chirac at the 1995 presidential election. He inspired the theme of Chirac's campaign which was named "the social fracture".

Their relations deteriorated when he took the lead of the RPR, after the right-wing defeat at the 1997 legislative election. He failed to change the name of the party to "The Rally". He criticized the ascendancy of President Chirac within the party, refusing to be the leader of a "Chirac's fan-club". He resigned in 1999 just before the European elections, leaving his deputy Nicolas Sarkozy in charge.

As the RPR's official candidate, he lost the 2001 mayoral election in Paris, mostly due to a heavily criticized campaign marred by gaffes and controversy. Refusing the merger of the Neo-Gaullist party with the right-wing classical forces in the Union for a Popular Movement, he quit politics in 2002.

He died at the age of 66 on 7 January 2010 from a heart attack.

== Political career ==
- President of the Court of Audit of France : 2004–2010 (death).

Governmental function

- Minister of Social Affairs and Employment : 1986–1988.

Electoral mandates

National Assembly

- President of the National Assembly of France : 1993–1997.
- Vice-president of the National Assembly of France : 1981–1986.
- Member of the National Assembly of France for Vosges (1st constituency) : 1978–1986 / 1988–2002. Elected in 1978, reelected in 1981, 1986, 1988, 1993, 1997.

Regional Council

- Vice-president of the Regional Council of Lorraine : 1979–1983.
- Regional councillor of LorraineLorraine : 1979–1986.

Municipal Council

- Mayor of Épinal : 1983–1997 (resigned).
- Municipal councillor of Épinal : 1983–1997 (resigned).
- Councillor of Paris : 2001–2002 (resigned).

Political functions

- President of the Rally for the Republic : 1997–1999 (resigned).

Political offices
Preceded by Georgina Dufoix	Minister for Social Affairs and Employment; 1986–1988	Succeeded by Michel Delebarre
Preceded by Henri Emmanuelli	President of the National Assembly; 1993–1997	Succeeded by Laurent Fabius
Party political offices
Preceded by Alain Juppé	President of Rally for the Republic; 1997–1999	Succeeded by Nicolas Sarkozy; Acting
Legal offices
Preceded by François Logerot	First President of the Court of Audit; 2004–2010	Succeeded by Didier Migaud
