= Cour des Comptes =

Supreme audit institution of the French Republic

Coordinates: 48.8669°N 2.3257°E

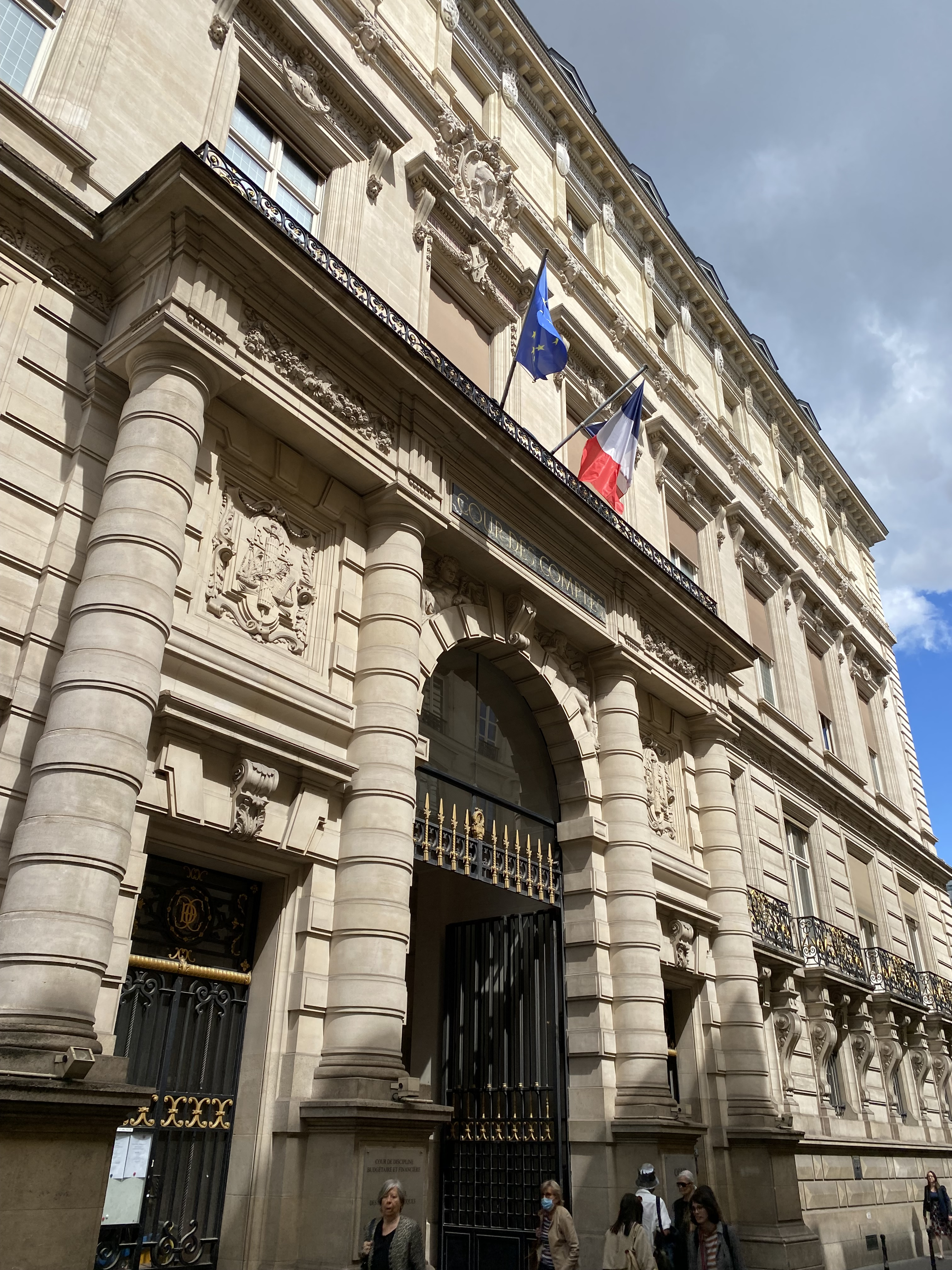
Seat of the Cour des Comptes at 13, rue Cambon in Paris

The Cour des Comptes (French pronunciation: [kuʁ de kɔ̃t], "Court of Accounts") is France's supreme audit institution, under French law an administrative court. As such, it is independent from the legislative and executive branches of the French Government. However, the 1946 and 1958 French constitutions made it the Court's duty to assist the Cabinet and Parliament in regulating government spending. The Court thus combines functions of a court of exchequer, comptroller general's office, and auditor general's office in common-law countries. It is also a Grand Corps of the French State and mainly recruits among the best-ranked students graduating from the Ecole nationale d'administration.

The Court traces its origins back to the Middle Ages and views itself as succeeding the Court of Auditors of Paris, permanently established in the early 14th century. It was re-established in 1807 by Napoleon.

Its three duties are to conduct financial audits of accounts, conduct good governance audits, and provide information and advice to the French Parliament and Administration. The Court verifies the good form of accounting and the proper handling of public money. Its mandate covers most public institutions and some private institutions, including the central Government, national public corporations, social security agencies (since 1950), and other public services (since 1976).

== History ==
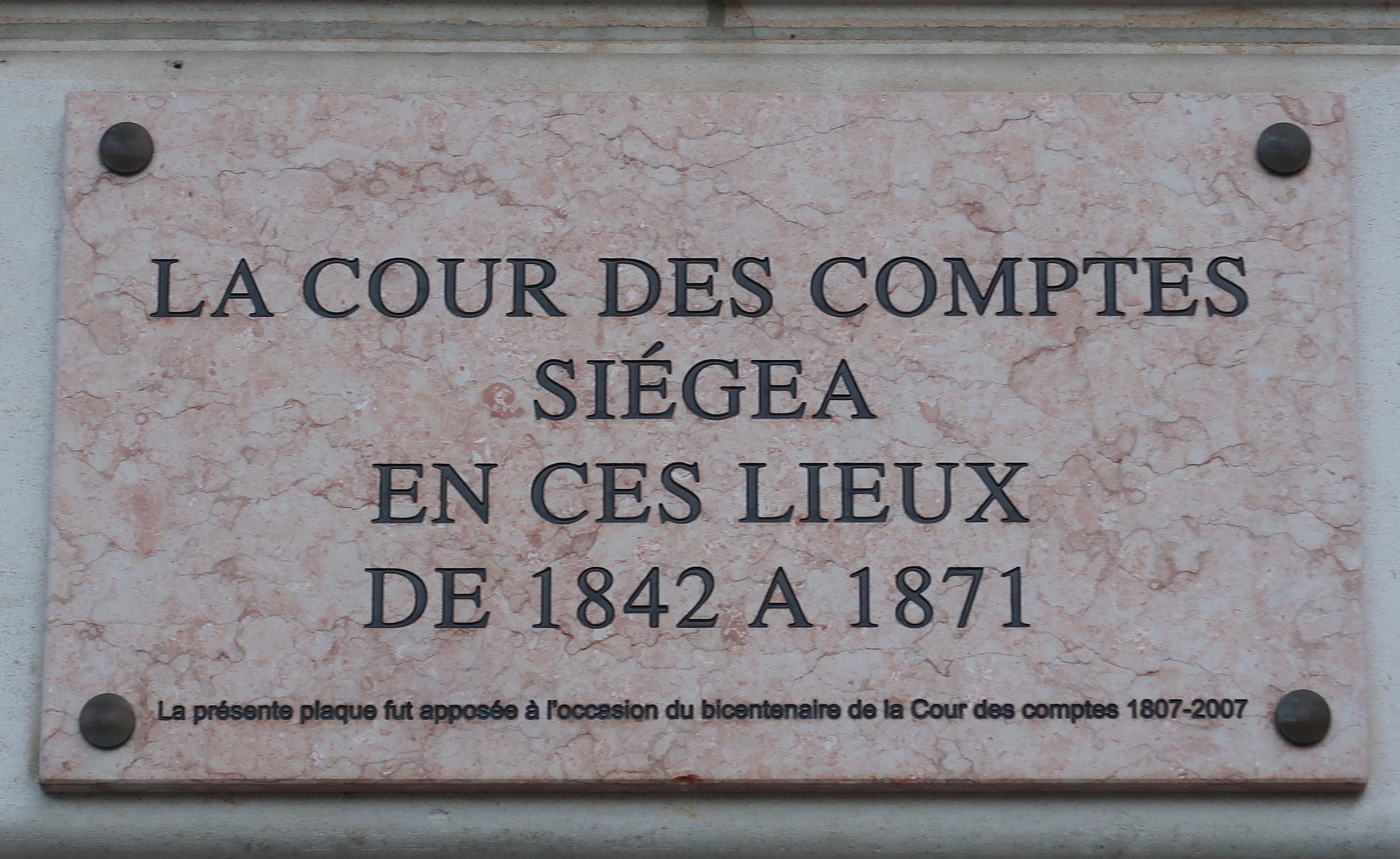
Plaque memorializing the former location of the Cour des Comptes in the Palais d'Orsay, now on the building of the Musée d'Orsay

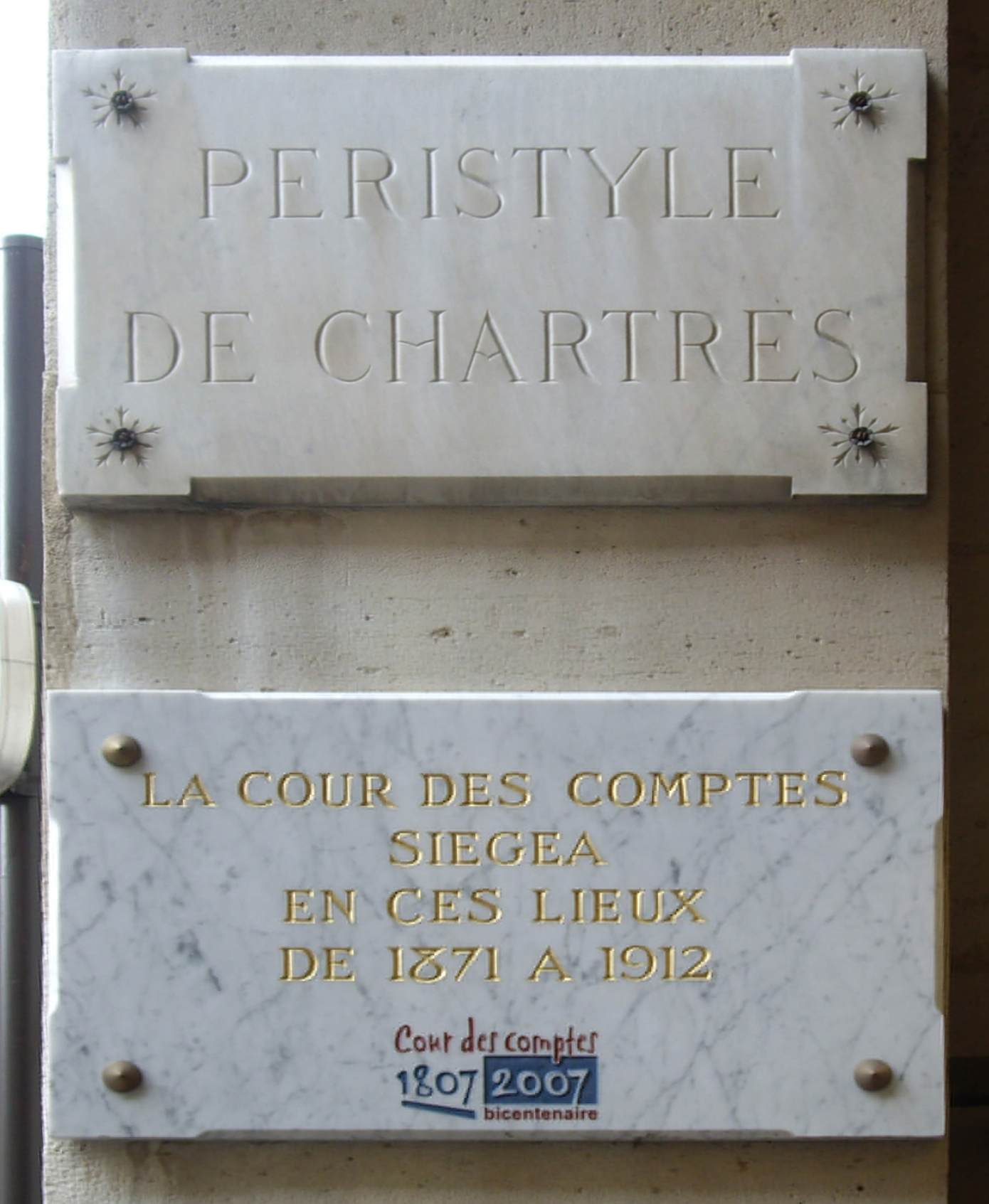
Plaque memorializing the former location of the Cour des Comptes in the Palais-Royal

During the Ancien Régime, the Court of Auditors was located in the French monarchy's ancestral Palais de la Cité, between the Sainte-Chapelle and the Conciergerie. In 1740 it moved to a new building in the same complex, designed by Jacques Gabriel, which is no longer extant.

The Cour des Comptes was reorganized by Napoleon through the Law of September 16, 1807. In 1842, it eventually moved away from the Île de la Cité into the Palais d'Orsay. In May 1871 at the end of the Paris Commune, the Palais d'Orsay was entirely destroyed by fire and the Cour des Comptes was temporarily relocated in the Palais-Royal. Its relocation in the aile de Marsan of the Louvre Palace was considered but only some of its archives were moved there, and in 1897 the Marsan Wing was attributed to what is now the Musée des Arts Décoratifs. Instead, it was decided to build a new office specifically for the Cour des Comptes.

The new building on rue Cambon was designed by architect Constant Moyaux, and after the latter's death in October 1911 by Paul Guadet, on the site of a former convent whose church survives nearby as Notre-Dame-de-l'Assomption. It was inaugurated in 1912 by President Armand Fallières. The Cour des Comptes remains located there after more than a century.

== Composition ==
The president (premier président) of the Court of Audit is appointed by Order-in-Council of the Cabinet. Once appointed, the president of the Court and division presidents have security of tenure. The Court has its own Office of the Prosecutor - with a Chief Prosecutor, Chief Deputy Prosecutor, and two deputy prosecutors - that represents the Government before the Court. The Court is split into seven divisions, each with nearly 30 judges ordinary and deputy judges and headed by a division president. Jurisdiction is split between the seven divisions generally by subject matter, e.g., finance, health and social security, and so forth. The Court's president is Pierre Moscovici since June 2020. He took over Didier Migaud who himself took over in 2010 following the death of Philippe Séguin. Other judicial officers are generally split into three groups by rank:

- puisne judges (conseillers-maîtres)
  - consider, hear, and adjudicate cases in panels
- deputy judges (conseillers référendaires)
  - divided into 2 classes; handle case management
- Auditor-Masters (auditeurs)
  - divided into 2 classes; preside over hearings, collect evidence, audit, and report

All judicial officers are graduates from the National Administration Academy (École nationale d'Administration) or recruited from the Office of the Comptroller-General (inspection générale des Finances).

== Jurisdiction and duties ==
=== Original jurisdiction ===
The French Court of Audit has original jurisdiction to audit and adjudicate accounts made by public, management, and government accountants. The Court also has authority to audit persons acting but not certified as a public accountant. If an account is found to be correct, then the Court issues a quietus to discharge the accountant. If, however, the account is found to be in error, then a debit order is issued against the defaulter. Either order is subject to appeal in the Court or final appeal at the French Supreme Court.

Audits focus on:

- Government accounting, budgets, and funds
- Public corporations
- National and public institutions, social security organizations, subsidiaries and sub-subsidiaries of public corporations
- Government-funded organizations
- Publicly funded organizations

=== Appellate jurisdiction ===
A decision from a lower audit court may be appealed at the main Court of Audit within two months of its being handed down. Afterwards, if the parties are still not satisfied, the Council of State will hear the case on final appeal.

The French Court of Audit puts together its auditing program entirely independently and is vested with very broad powers of review and examination. It publishes and submits an annual audit report to the French President and to Parliament. The report provides a detailed account of the government's poor, or possibly fraudulent, practices and criticizes poor governance and use of public funds. The Court also audits authorizing officers (ordonnateurs) and their expenditures.

== Audit procedure ==
In addition to reporting poor practices, the Court judges the accounting of public financial and budgetary officials, collection agencies, or treasury departments, e.g., treasurers, paymasters-general, tax collectors, certified public accountants, and can fine them for late reporting. In such cases, the Court fines public accounting officials for the exact amount of any sum of money that, due to an error on their part, they have unduly paid or failed to recover on behalf of the State. A debet (débet), from Latin "he owes" and not limited in amount, is entered against a defaulting person, and the defaulter becomes the State's debtor. Public and government accountants must therefore have performance liability insurance. Often, however, the Ministry of Finance alleviates a defaulter by granting an abatement of his arrears as the full amount is likely too much to ever pay out of pocket. If an account is audited and found not to be in default, then the Court issues a quietus (arrêt de quitus or arrêt de décharge) acquitting and discharging the official and settling the account.

== Regional audit courts ==
The Court of Audit of France stands above and heads 27 regional inferior financial courts referred to in French as Chambres régionales des comptes, or regional audit courts. The Court of Audit acts as the administrative head and court of appeal for the financial stream, hearing appeals from regional courts and issuing rule promulgation orders and administrative directives. Regional audit courts were established in 1982 to help unburden the main Court of Audit of its heavy caseload. Since their creation, they have original jurisdiction for most local, county, and regional accounting matters in continental France and its overseas dependencies. This means they audit accounts as well as public institutions to check for fraud, embezzlement, or misappropriation. In case of budgetary discrepancies, the Court can ask the local prefect to intervene and oversee the handling of public funds until budget problems have been corrected.

Each court is divided into divisions and includes a judge-in-Charge - who is also either a puisne or deputy judge at the main Court of Audit - and two associate judges. Judges have security of tenure and some also serve as Commissioners-in-Council with prosecutorial duties under the Office of the Prosecutor at the Court of Audit of France. The regional courts focus on:

- budgetary audits and assessment of local public institutions' budget use and management
- audits of institutions and agencies in a given regional jurisdiction, namely: public institutions (schools, public housing, hospitals) or groups funded or aided by local governments or public institutions (unions or trade associations)
- efficiency evaluations of account management

Accounts found to be in error are entered into debit and accounts in default or fictitious are referred to the local prefect.

Accounts for towns of fewer than 3,500 inhabitants and receipts totalling less than 750,000 euros are automatically referred to the local county or regional treasurer. A regional audit court's ruling may be appealed in the same court or to the Court of Audit of France.

== Individuals ==
=== First Presidents ===
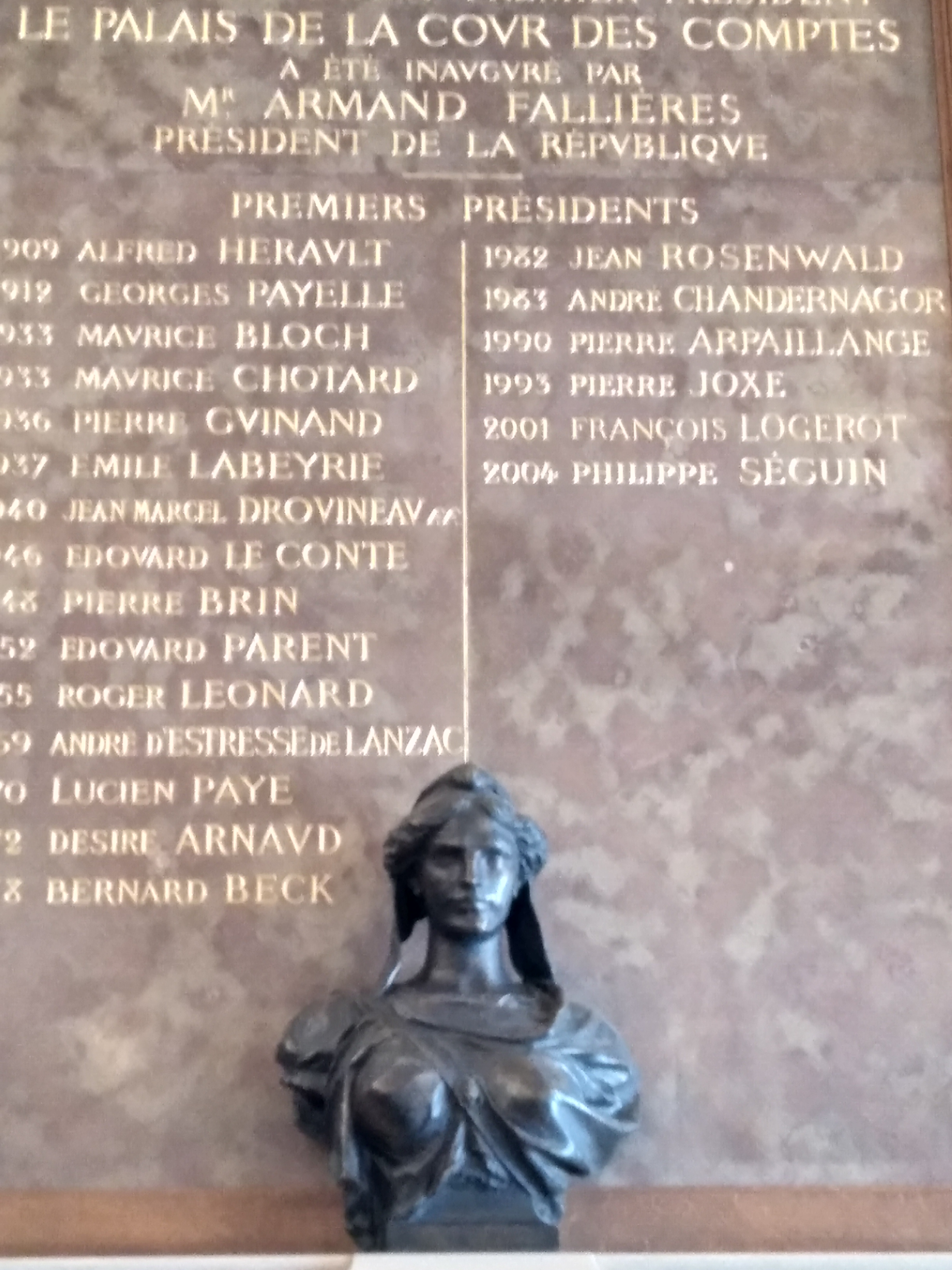
List of former premiers présidents of the Cour des Comptes since moving to the current building in 1912

- François Barbé-Marbois (1807–1834, with brief interruption in 1815)
- Jean-Baptiste Collin de Sussy (March–June 1815)
- Félix Barthe (1834–1837 and 1839–1863)
- Joseph Jérôme Siméon (1837–1839)
- Ernest de Royer (1863–1877)
- Jules-Joseph Petitjean (1877–1880)
- Paul Louis Gabriel Bethmont (1880–1889)
- Gustave Humbert (1890–1894)
- Ernest Boulanger (1894–1900)
- Henri Labeyrie (1900–1901)
- Félix Renaud (1901–1907)
- Charles François Laurent (1907–1909)
- Alfred Hérault (1909–1912)
- Georges Payelle (1912–1933)
- Maurice Bloch (1933)
- Maurice Chotard (1933–1936)
- Pierre Guinand (1936–1937)
- Émile Labeyrie (1937–1940)
- Jean-Marcel Drouineau (1940–1946)
- Édouard Le Conte (1946–1948)
- Pierre Brin (1948–1952)
- Édouard Parent (1952–1955)
- Roger Léonard (1955–1959)
- André d'Estresse de Lanzac de Laborie (1959–1970)
- Lucien Paye (1970–1972)
- Désiré Arnaud (1972–1978)
- Bernard Beck (1978–1982)
- Jean Rosenwald (1982–1983)
- André Chandernagor (1983–1990)
- Pierre Arpaillange (1990–1993)
- Pierre Joxe (1993–2001)
- François Logerot (2001–2004)
- Philippe Séguin (2004–2010)
- Didier Migaud (2010–2020)
- Pierre Moscovici (2020–2026)
- Amélie de Montchalin (2026-present)

=== Other notable members or former members ===
- Bernard Attali
- François d'Aubert
- David Azéma
- Dominique Baert
- Julien Bargeton
- Claire Bazy-Malaurie
- Jean-Louis Bourlanges
- Jean Castex
- Jacques Chirac
- Charles de Courson
- Marie-France Garaud
- Jean de Gaulle
- Brigitte Girardin
- Henri Guaino
- François Hollande
- Alain Lamassoure
- Alain Lambert
- Dominique Lefebvre
- Alain Le Roy
- Bernadette Malgorn
- Juliette Méadel
- Étienne Pflimlin
- Bruno Racine
- Rémy Rioux
- Jean-Pierre Soisson
- Emmanuelle Wargon

== See also ==
- INTOSAI
- INCOSAI
- EUROSAI
- Council of State (France)
- European Court of Auditors
- Court of Auditors (France)
- Administrative jurisdiction in France
