= La Chapelle-Bâton, Deux-Sèvres =

La Chapelle-Bâton
- Commune
- Location of La Chapelle-Bâton
- Location within France Location within Nouvelle-Aquitaine
- Coordinates: 46°28′29″N 0°19′42″W
- Country: France
- Region: Nouvelle-Aquitaine
- Department: Deux-Sèvres
- Arrondissement: Parthenay
- Canton: Autize-Égray

Government
  - Mayor (2021–2026): Pierre Siraud
- Area^{1}: 16.93 km^{2} (6.54 sq mi)
- Elevation: 109 m (358 ft)
- Highest elevation: 200 m (660 ft)
- Lowest elevation: 78 m (256 ft)
- Population (2023): 415
  - Density: 24.5/km^{2} (63.5/sq mi)
- Time zone: UTC+01:00 (CET)
  - Summer (DST): UTC+02:00 (CEST)
- INSEE/Postal code: 79070 /79220
- ^{1} French Land Register data, which excludes lakes, ponds, glaciers > 1 km^{2} (0.386 sq mi or 247 acres) and river estuaries.

La Chapelle-Bâton (French pronunciation: [la ʃapɛl batɔ̃]) is a commune in the Deux-Sèvres department in the Nouvelle-Aquitaine region in western France.

== See also ==
- Communes of the Deux-Sèvres department
