= Fenioux, Deux-Sèvres =

Fenioux
- Commune
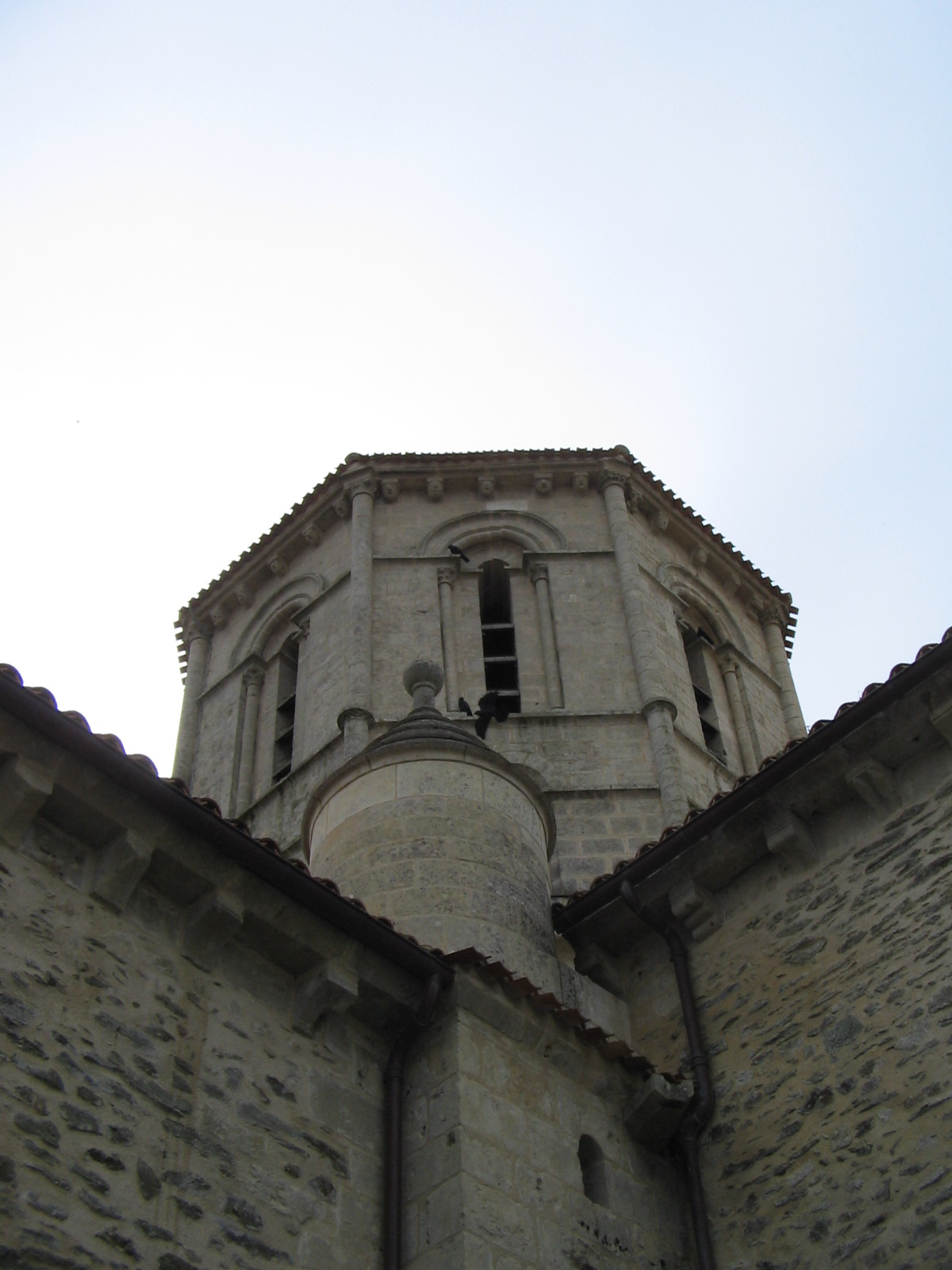
- The tower of the church
- Location of Fenioux
- Location within France Location within Nouvelle-Aquitaine
- Coordinates: 46°32′44″N 0°29′33″W
- Country: France
- Region: Nouvelle-Aquitaine
- Department: Deux-Sèvres
- Arrondissement: Parthenay
- Canton: Autize-Égray

Government
  - Mayor (2020–2026): Valérie Texier
- Area^{1}: 33.65 km^{2} (12.99 sq mi)
- Elevation: 200 m (660 ft)
- Highest elevation: 228 m (748 ft)
- Lowest elevation: 53 m (174 ft)
- Population (2023): 638
  - Density: 19.0/km^{2} (49.1/sq mi)
- Time zone: UTC+01:00 (CET)
  - Summer (DST): UTC+02:00 (CEST)
- INSEE/Postal code: 79119 /79160
- ^{1} French Land Register data, which excludes lakes, ponds, glaciers > 1 km^{2} (0.386 sq mi or 247 acres) and river estuaries.

Fenioux (French pronunciation: [fənju]) is a commune in the Deux-Sèvres department in the Nouvelle-Aquitaine region in western France. The romanesque church of Saint-Pierre was built in the 12th century.

== See also ==
- Communes of the Deux-Sèvres department
