= Champdeniers =

- Commune
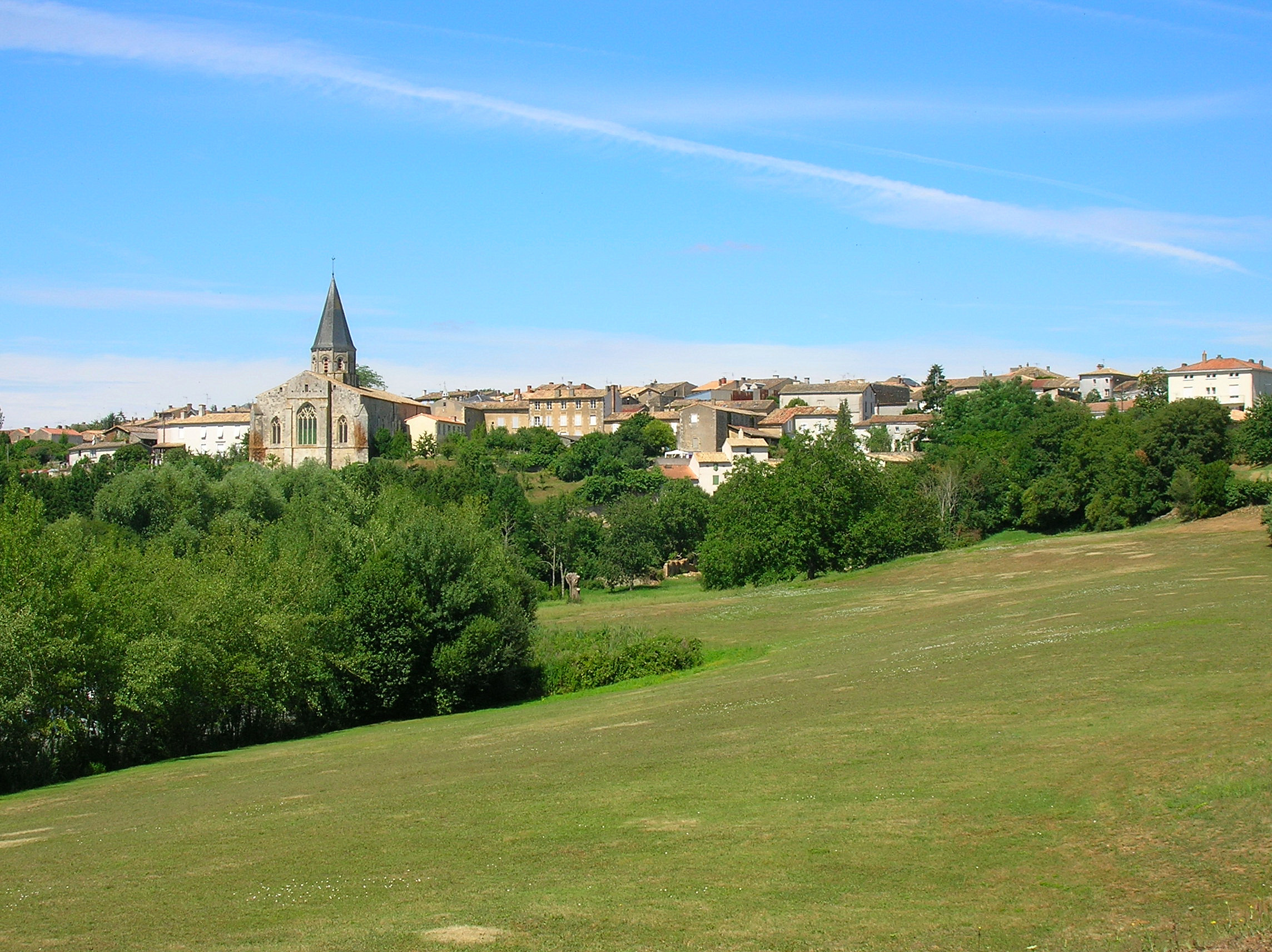
- A general view of Champdeniers

- Coat of arms
- Location of Champdeniers
- Location within France Location within Nouvelle-Aquitaine
- Coordinates: 46°29′06″N 0°24′14″W
- Country: France
- Region: Nouvelle-Aquitaine
- Department: Deux-Sèvres
- Arrondissement: Parthenay
- Canton: Autize-Égray
- Intercommunality: Val de Gâtine

Government
  - Mayor (2020–2026): Alain Capelle
- Area^{1}: 21.81 km^{2} (8.42 sq mi)
- Elevation: 120 m (390 ft)
- Highest elevation: 171 m (561 ft)
- Lowest elevation: 67 m (220 ft)
- Population (2023): 1,784
  - Density: 81.80/km^{2} (211.9/sq mi)
- Time zone: UTC+01:00 (CET)
  - Summer (DST): UTC+02:00 (CEST)
- INSEE/Postal code: 79066 /79220
- ^{1} French Land Register data, which excludes lakes, ponds, glaciers > 1 km^{2} (0.386 sq mi or 247 acres) and river estuaries.

Champdeniers (French pronunciation: [ʃɑ̃dənje]; before 2018: Champdeniers-Saint-Denis) is a commune in the Deux-Sèvres department in the Nouvelle-Aquitaine region in western France.

== See also ==
- Communes of the Deux-Sèvres department
