= La Salle-en-Beaumont =

- Commune
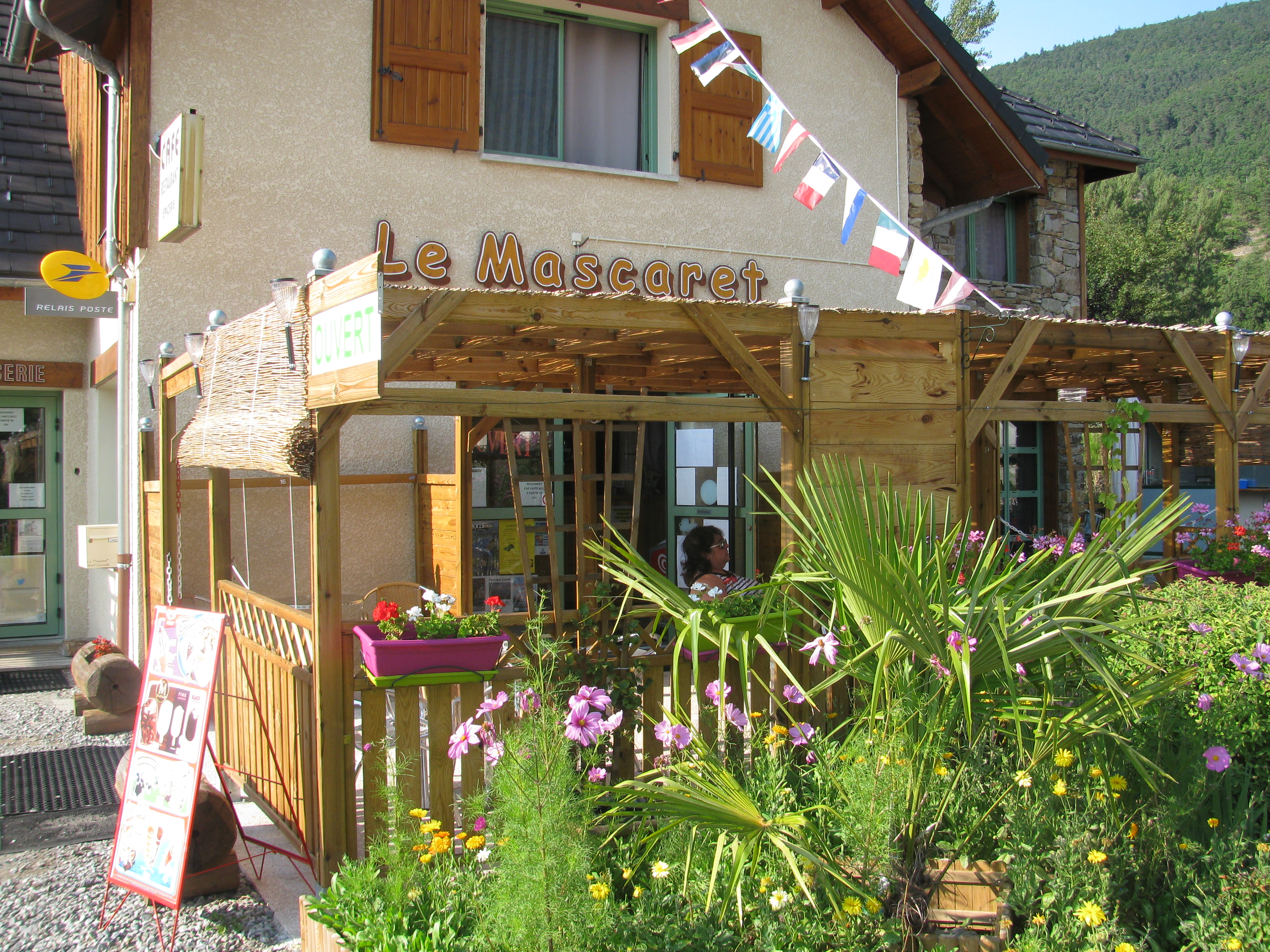
- The post office in La Salle-en-Beaumont
- Location of La Salle-en-Beaumont
- Location within France Location within Auvergne-Rhône-Alpes
- Coordinates: 44°51′46″N 5°51′52″E
- Country: France
- Region: Auvergne-Rhône-Alpes
- Department: Isère
- Arrondissement: Grenoble
- Canton: Matheysine-Trièves

Government
  - Mayor (2023–2026): Jean-Paul Paulin
- Area^{1}: 9 km^{2} (3.5 sq mi)
- Elevation: 800 m (2,600 ft)
- Highest elevation: 1,480 m (4,860 ft)
- Lowest elevation: 579 m (1,900 ft)
- Population (2023): 355
  - Density: 39/km^{2} (100/sq mi)
- Time zone: UTC+01:00 (CET)
  - Summer (DST): UTC+02:00 (CEST)
- INSEE/Postal code: 38470 /38350
- ^{1} French Land Register data, which excludes lakes, ponds, glaciers > 1 km^{2} (0.386 sq mi or 247 acres) and river estuaries.

La Salle-en-Beaumont is a commune in the Isère department in southeastern France.

The village experienced a landslide on the 8th of January 1994 which destroyed the church and multiple houses. It covered the main road over distance of 100 meters.

== Population ==
Historical population
Year	Pop.	±% p.a.
1968	222	—
1975	233	+0.69%
1982	250	+1.01%
1990	278	+1.34%
1999	241	−1.57%
2007	276	+1.71%
2012	322	+3.13%
2017	318	−0.25%
2023	355	+1.85%
Source: INSEE

== See also ==
- Communes of the Isère department
