= Cherveux =

- Commune
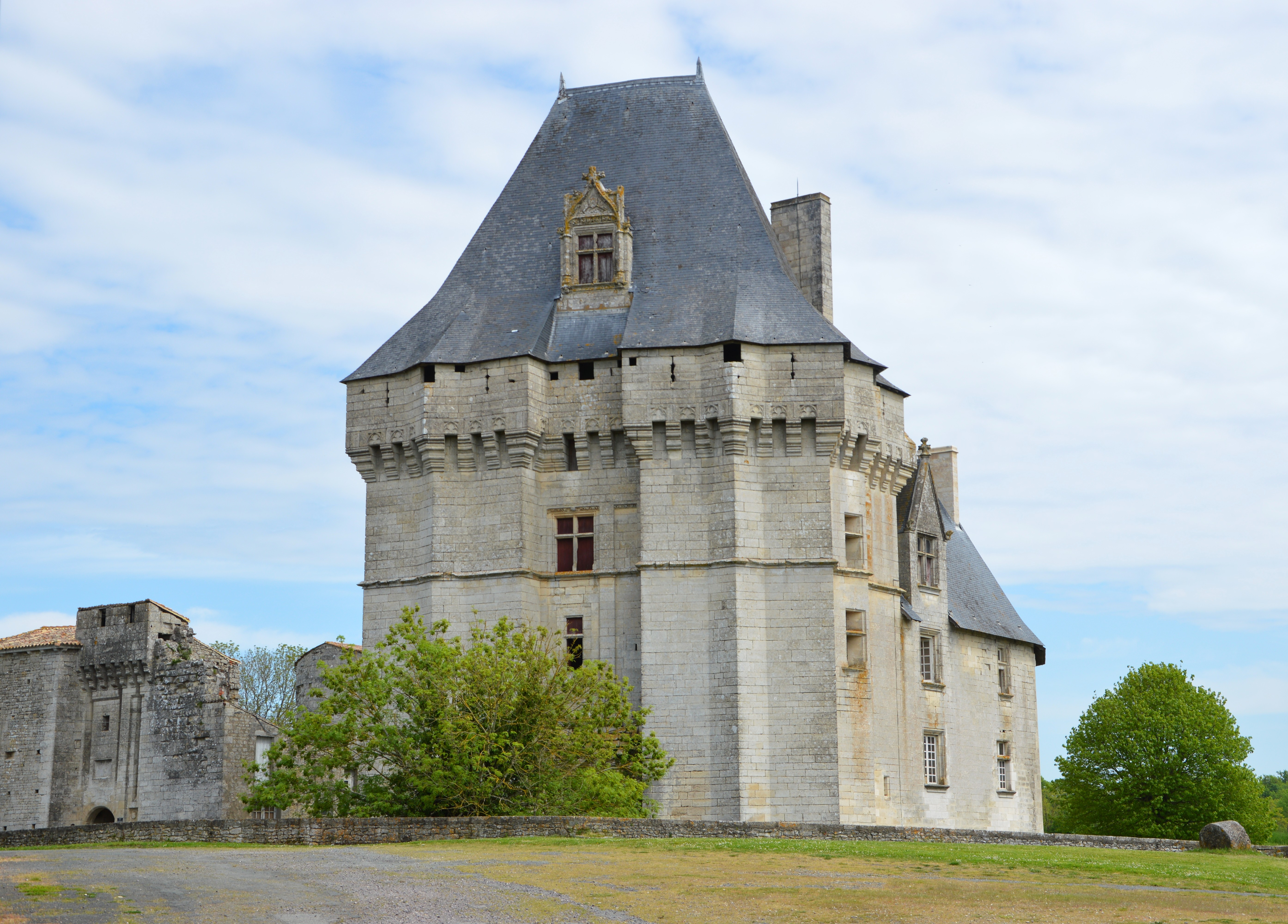
- The Château of Cherveux

- Coat of arms
- Location of Cherveux
- Location within France Location within Nouvelle-Aquitaine
- Coordinates: 46°24′59″N 0°21′21″W
- Country: France
- Region: Nouvelle-Aquitaine
- Department: Deux-Sèvres
- Arrondissement: Niort
- Canton: Autize-Égray

Government
  - Mayor (2020–2026): Marie-Pierre Missioux
- Area^{1}: 22.2 km^{2} (8.6 sq mi)
- Population (2023): 1,885
  - Density: 84.9/km^{2} (220/sq mi)
- Time zone: UTC+01:00 (CET)
  - Summer (DST): UTC+02:00 (CEST)
- INSEE/Postal code: 79086 /79410
- ^{1} French Land Register data, which excludes lakes, ponds, glaciers > 1 km^{2} (0.386 sq mi or 247 acres) and river estuaries.

Cherveux (French pronunciation: [ʃɛʁvø]) is a commune in the Deux-Sèvres department in the Nouvelle-Aquitaine region in western France.

== Origins ==
Prehistoric period : Flint tools (bifaces-knife-scraper-ax-tips of arrows) buried in the plain testify that the place was inhabited during prehistoric times.

Roman period : Some vestiges attest that the Romans occupied some places

The name of Cherveux : is of Celtic origin, which would indicate that the area originated at a very ancient date. This village was first known under the name of Carvium in 1100, then, a century later as Cherveox and Cheveras until the fifteenth century. It then became Cherveaux, then, by 1603, Chevreoux and later, Cherveus. It was then called St. Pierre of Cherveux into the 18th century before being simply Cherveux. Its name came from hemp (in "local patois": chorbe or chorve). Since this plant was very abundant in this region, many people made their living as weavers and manufacturer of rope).

Cherveux probably owes its existence to a monastery that was settled close to the "motte féodale" that was later to become the powerful fortress of the Lusignans. Monks that lived in it were driven out during the wars that ravaged the Poitou. The monastery has been destroyed and on the site now stands a church that rises on the remains of the ancient monastery, known as St-Pierre's de Poitiers cathedral. Stones that have been found in the church graveyard are shaped like those of Civaux and Nanteuil. In a stable of the castle farm, there is a window that leads to the ruins of the ancient monastery.

Some places around Cherveux called Maurie and the Raberie (spelled before Araberie) remind us of the passage of the Maure and the Arabian.

== History ==
The castle is situated on the site of the original fortress built by the Lusignans: no doubt about its ancient origin since it is told that the "Fairy Melusine" was its ancestor.

In the Middle Ages, the Lusignan family became powerful, allowing one of its branches to ascend to the throne of Cyprus and Jerusalem at the beginning of the thirteenth century.

Hugues XI de Lusignan fell out with St. Louis IX, who seized Cherveux in 1242 and gave it to his brother Alphonse, Count of Poitiers. Hugues proved his allegiance to the king by accompanying him on the Seventh Crusade and died in a battle just after arriving in Egypt in 1249.

The castle was given back to Hugues' descendants, and then it passed into the hands of the Mello family, then the Craon family and finally to that of Chalon. The English then took it during the reign of King Edward III of England in 1363 and was given to William of Felton, the Senechal of Poitou. After the conquest of the province by Duguesclin, Cherveux was returned to the Chalon family whence it passed to the Tremoille line that in turn sold it in 1457 to Armaury d'Etissac, Lord of Coulonges Les Royaux who yielded it to Jean de Naydes who in his turn sold it to the Chenin family.

Their daughter Louise Chenin married Robert Conningham in May 1440. Of Scottish origin, captain of the bodyguard of King Louis XI of France, Conningham (or Conygham) had the means to erect the whole of the present Cherveux Castle in one single effort about 1470.

The Scots and the French were bound together by the Auld Alliance. The Scots Guard - Garde Écossaise - was founded in 1418 by King Charles VII of France. The Scots soldiers of the Garde Écossaise fought alongside Joan of Arc against England during the Hundred Years' War. On 22 March 1421, a Franco-Scots force under John Stewart, Earl of Buchan, and Gilbert Motier de La Fayette defeated a larger English Army at the Battle of Baugé. Three years later, at the Battle of Verneuil, the Scots lost around 6,000 men, including John Stewart. The Garde Écossaise was seen as an elite military unit. King Louis XI of France had The Scots Guard act as personal bodyguards to the French monarchy. In return for service, Scottish soldiers were often granted honorable positions and lands in France.

Later, the castle was passed via successive marriages to the Puyguion and St. Gelais families. Although it was a principal, formidable stronghold, it was, nevertheless, taken in 1569 by the Marquis of Lude who installed a garrison of swordsmen and then again in 1574 by the Duc of Montpensier.

Until the eighteenth century, it was held by the Plessis-Chatillon family which was succeeded by the Narbonne-Pelet family.

The castle was confiscated by the state and sold three years after the French Revolution to Pierre Aloneau. The descendants of Aloneau (the family Clouzot Meynier) preserved it until 1931 and sold it to Mr. and Mrs. Redien Lucien, whose family has restored and preserved the castle and farmed the land since 1912. The castle was listed as a monument historique on 16 September 1929.

== See also ==
- Communes of the Deux-Sèvres department

== Bibliography ==
- E. Gaboreau: Histoire du château et de Cherveux : "Glanes sur Cherveux" 1978.
