= Coulonges-sur-l'Autize =

- Commune
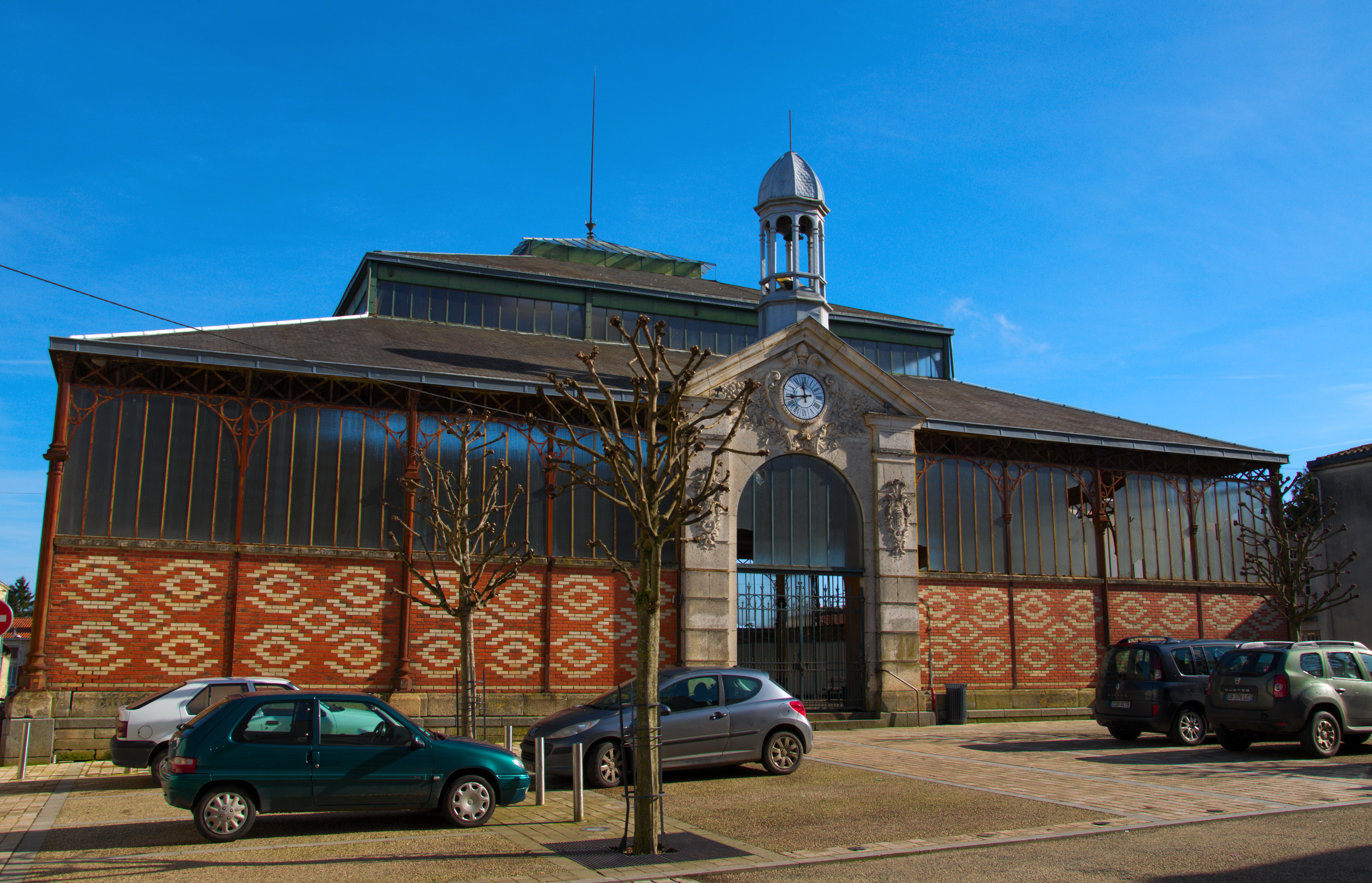
- The covered market
- Location of Coulonges-sur-l'Autize
- Location within France Location within Nouvelle-Aquitaine
- Coordinates: 46°29′03″N 0°35′52″W
- Country: France
- Region: Nouvelle-Aquitaine
- Department: Deux-Sèvres
- Arrondissement: Parthenay
- Canton: Autize-Égray

Government
  - Mayor (2020–2026): Danielle Taverneau
- Area^{1}: 18.87 km^{2} (7.29 sq mi)
- Elevation: 83 m (272 ft)
- Highest elevation: 121 m (397 ft)
- Lowest elevation: 27 m (89 ft)
- Population (2023): 2,345
  - Density: 124.3/km^{2} (321.9/sq mi)
- Time zone: UTC+01:00 (CET)
  - Summer (DST): UTC+02:00 (CEST)
- INSEE/Postal code: 79101 /79160
- ^{1} French Land Register data, which excludes lakes, ponds, glaciers > 1 km^{2} (0.386 sq mi or 247 acres) and river estuaries.

Coulonges-sur-l'Autize (French pronunciation: [kulɔ̃ʒ syʁ lotiz]) is a commune in the Deux-Sèvres department in the Nouvelle-Aquitaine region in western France.

== Population ==
Historical population
Year	Pop.	±% p.a.
1968	2,021	—
1975	2,030	+0.06%
1982	2,019	−0.08%
1990	2,021	+0.01%
1999	2,146	+0.67%
2007	2,362	+1.21%
2012	2,365	+0.03%
2017	2,350	−0.13%
2023	2,345	−0.04%
Source: INSEE

== See also ==
- Communes of the Deux-Sèvres department
