= Canton of Autize-Égray =

Coordinates: 46.48°N 0.60°W

The canton of Autize-Égray is an administrative division of the Deux-Sèvres department, western France. It was created at the French canton reorganisation which came into effect in March 2015. Its seat is in Coulonges-sur-l'Autize.

It consists of the following communes:

1. Ardin
2. Béceleuf
3. Beugnon-Thireuil
4. Le Busseau
5. Champdeniers
6. La Chapelle-Bâton
7. Cherveux
8. Coulonges-sur-l'Autize
9. Cours
10. Faye-sur-Ardin
11. Fenioux
12. Germond-Rouvre
13. Pamplie
14. Puihardy
15. Saint-Christophe-sur-Roc
16. Sainte-Ouenne
17. Saint-Laurs
18. Saint-Maixent-de-Beugné
19. Saint-Maxire
20. Saint-Pompain
21. Saint-Rémy
22. Sciecq
23. Scillé
24. Surin
25. Villiers-en-Plaine
26. Xaintray
