= Fist and rose =

Socialist and social democratic symbol

The 1979 logo of the Socialist International

The fist and rose, sometimes called the rose in the fist or fist with a rose, is an emblem used or formerly used by a number of left-wing and centre-left parties and political organizations around the world. It depicts a rose, symbolizing the promises of a better life under a socialist government, and a clenched fist holding it, symbolizing the activist commitment and solidarity necessary to achieve it. The rose is displayed in the red colour associated with left-wing politics; recent variants display the leaves in green, reflecting the rise of environmental concerns. Its design involves political symbolism drawn from the history of socialism and social democracy, and also alluding to the counterculture of the 1960s.

The emblem was drawn in 1969 by the French graphic artist Marc Bonnet and became popular within the Socialist Party (PS), which made it its official logo in 1971. It was later used, with slight or large alterations and adaptations, by several parties elsewhere in Europe as well as in Africa, America, and Asia, although some have retired it since the end of the 20th century. In 1979, it was also taken up by the Socialist International (SI). It has often been chosen to provide an attractive visual alternative to the communist hammer and sickle, and to signal a party's affiliation to the SI and kinship with foreign left-wing parties.

== History and use ==
=== France ===
==== Creation and adoption ====
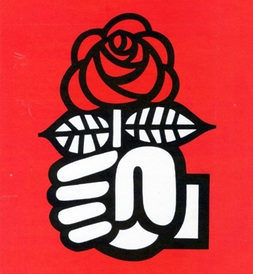
Marc Bonnet's 1969 version of the fist and rose emblem, without his signature

The emblem was created in France within the Socialist Party (PS), at the time of its transformation from the prior SFIO at the Alfortville Congress (May 1969) and of its enlargement to the rest of the "non-communist left" at the Épinay Congress (June 1971). The emblem of the SFIO was the Three Arrows, a 1930s anti-fascist symbol, which was falling in disuse as the party wished to modernize. The Ceres, a left-leaning faction, had taken control of the PS Paris Federation and actively sought to change the party. The initiative for the emblem is frequently, although disputedly, credited to Didier Motchane, a co-founder of the Ceres, who claimed to have "invented" it in his 2010 memoirs, but a role was also played by Georges Sarre, the first secretary of the Paris Federation, and Paul Calandra, its secretary for propaganda.

In late 1969, Calandra asked Yann Berriet, the founder of a communication agency, to come up with ideas expected to signal change and attract new members, especially women, with the request that they not look "too bolshevik". Calandra and Berriet met with Marc Bonnet, a graphic designer and a former employee of Berriet's agency, who submitted three draft designs; the federation leadership chose the fist and rose (French: le poing et la rose), of which Bonnet then drew a final form. According to Évelyn Soum, the other two submissions were a carnation and a bloom of flowers.

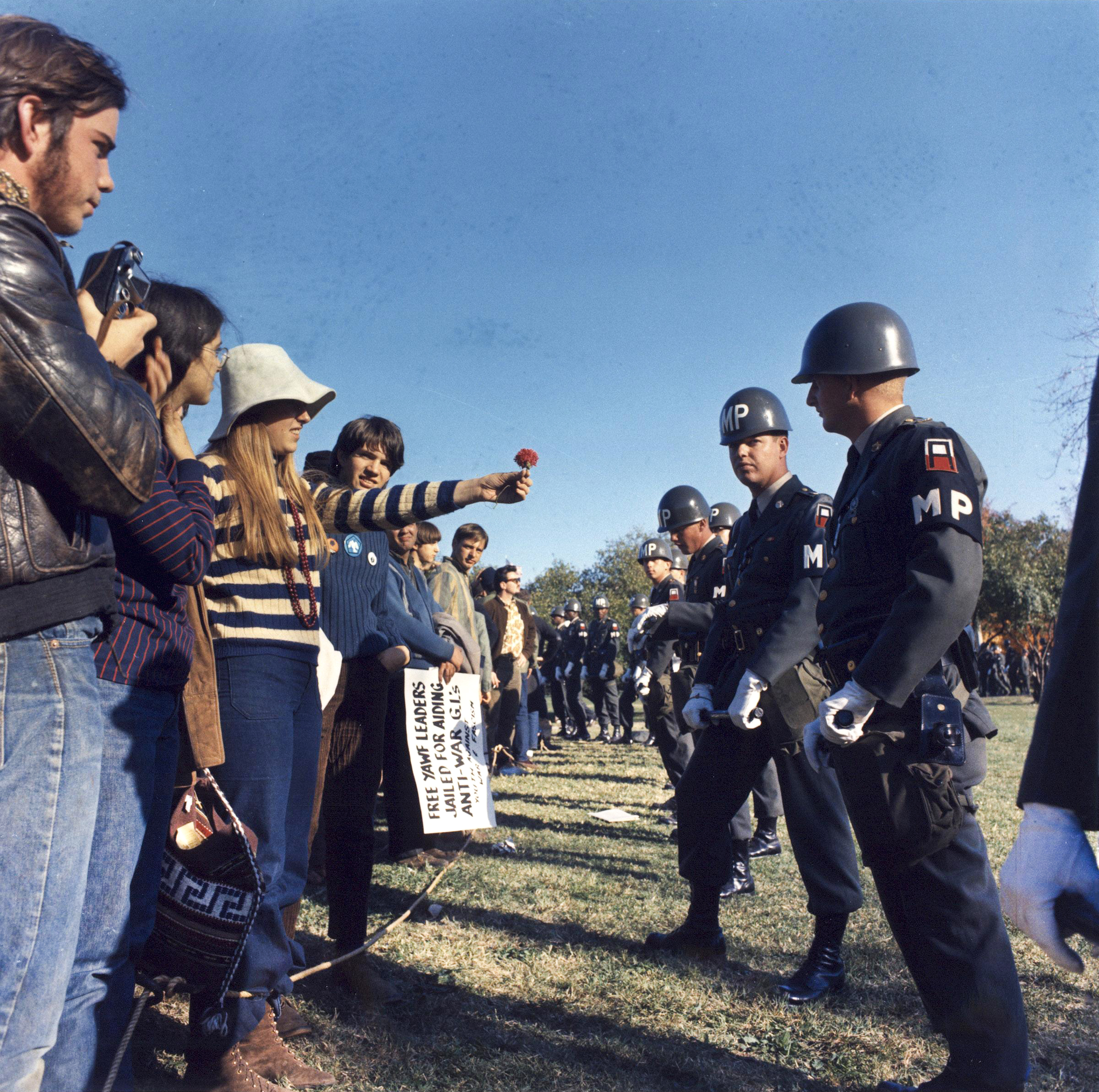
A flower power gesture at a 1967 anti-war demonstration in the United States

The rose symbol drew on long-standing associations with socialism. A small signature by Bonnet was originally part of the design, along the leftmost petal of the flower, as the PS wished to display professionalism; it was later removed to facilitate the party's merchandising. Although Berriet was close to the PS, Bonnet was not political; Berriet paid Bonnet for his work from his own pocket. Bonnet trademarked his design in 1974, and received 50,000 francs from the PS in 1975 in exchange for a transfer of rights, retroactive to 1970.

The fist and rose was first displayed in January–February 1970 on a poster of the Paris Federation, widely re-used for the March 1971 municipal election. Sarre described it in a press conference in February 1970: "The fulfilment which only socialism can enable (the rose) will only be possible by fighting (the fist)." It combined, and partly appropriated, symbolism drawn both from the traditions of French and European socialism, and from new ideas of the era. For example, the insignia of the SFIO youth organization had been an arm holding a rifle. The combination also meant to pacify the historic tension between reformism and revolution in the French left. SFIO posters had long avoided explicit revolutionary references such as the raised fist, in order not to frighten voters.

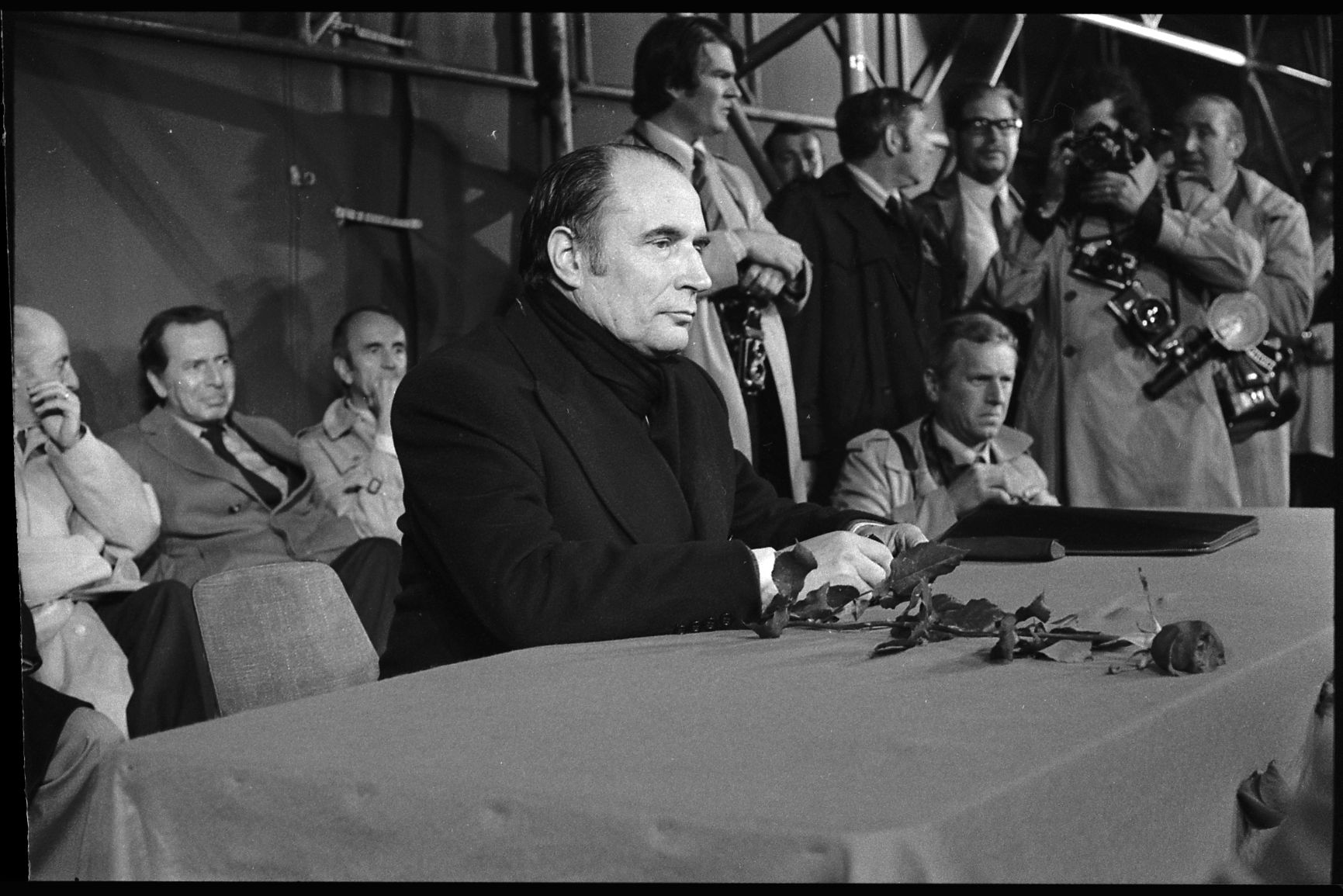
François Mitterrand, then the PS first secretary, at a 1974 presidential election campaign meeting, with a red rose in front of him

It was quickly picked up by the Socialist Youth Movement (MJS) and the Association of Socialist Postmen, of which Sarre was leader, and became popular with party members and other federations at the time of the Épinay Congress. There was a bottom-up element to its spread: since the Paris poster included, as legally required, the name and contact information of the printing house, some federations directly called it to obtain the picture. The Ceres entered the new party leadership after the congress, with Sarre and Berriet on the Propaganda Committee; this helped the emblem gain legitimacy, while the prior leadership, drawn from the old SFIO, had been broadly indifferent to symbols and communication.

In September 1971, it became the official party emblem. As the party made massive use of modern communication techniques to signal its transformation and reach out to new voters, it appeared in a matter of months on countless periodicals and brochures, but also posters, leaflets, and stickers, and in demonstrations and public meetings; it became customary for roses to be given away and held high by party leaders and members, for example at the cloture of party conventions. The monthly party bulletin took the title Le Poing et la Rose in November 1972. Due to the new leadership's willingness to reinterpret party history and to distance itself from the post-war decades, it was more slowly accepted in areas with long-standing socialist support, for example in northern France. François Mitterrand, the new PS first secretary, published a book titled La Rose au poing (The Rose in the Fist) in 1973.

==== Adaptations ====
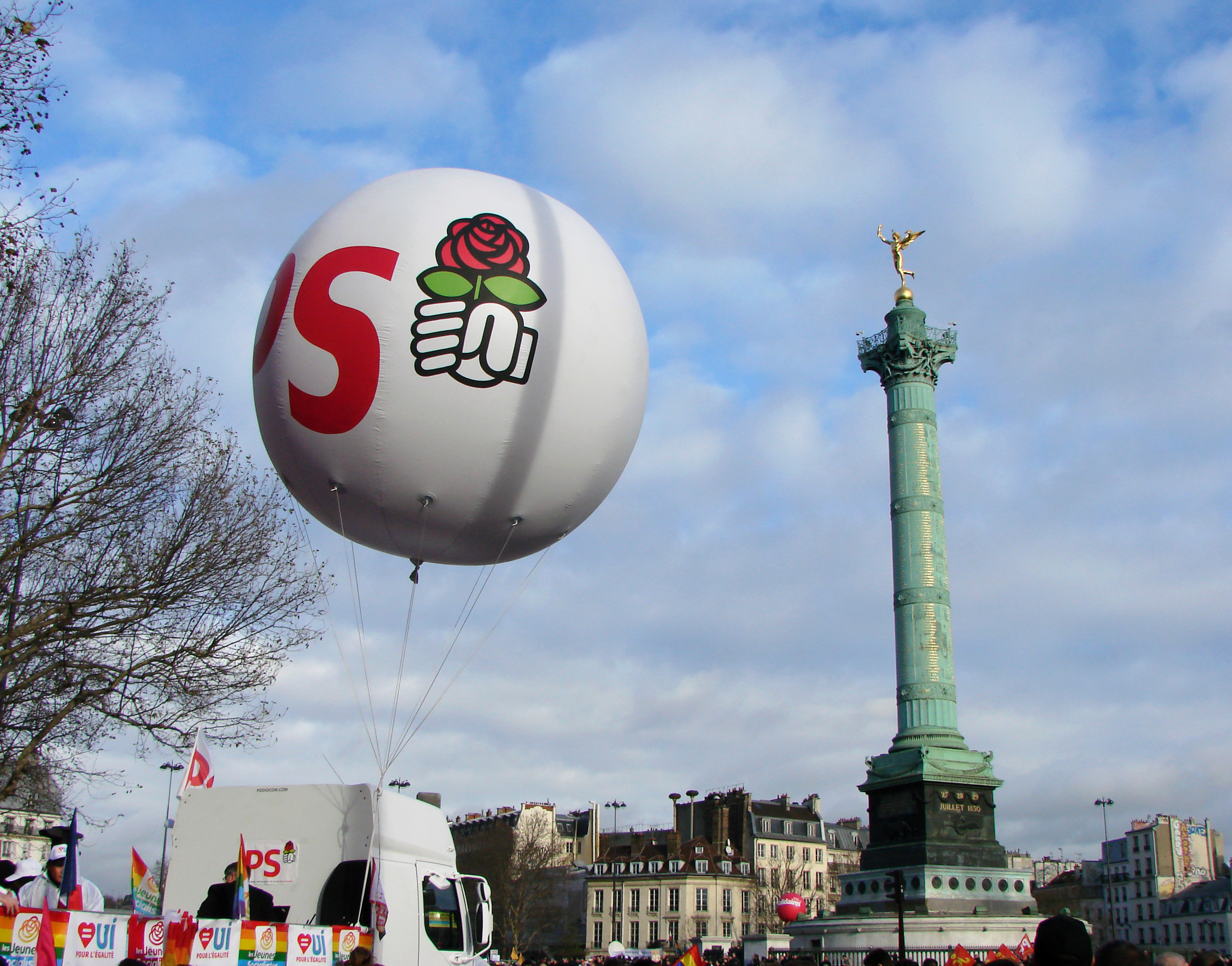
The 2010–2016 logo of the PS, displayed during a 2012 demonstration, Paris

The fist and rose remains widely associated with the rise of the PS in the 1970s and Mitterrand's victory at the 1981 presidential election. In a well-remembered gesture after his inauguration, Mitterrand walked to the Panthéon with his supporters, holding red roses in his hand, and entered the building to lay down roses on the tombs of Jean Jaurès (socialism), Jean Moulin (the Resistance), and Victor Schœlcher (abolitionism). Although the PS communication team originally discouraged colouring the leaves green, some federations did so as early as in the 1980s. This did not make its way to the official party logo until 2010.

The emblem's diminishing or returning visibility subsequently tended to depend on the party's wish to modernize and tone down its heritage, or to state its left leanings again. From the late 1980s, it was less frequently used on election posters, and reserved to communication aimed at party members; the rose was increasingly used and mentioned alone, avoiding the revolutionary reference of the fist, and the PS was often nicknamed "the rose party". It came back in favour in 1994 when the party was out of government.

The 2024 logo of the PS (coloured version).

In 2010, the party logo became a larger "PS", "limiting the rose in the fist to a marginal visual role, like a post-ideological afterthought", positioned as in superscript. The leaves were coloured pale green, and were simplified without veins to fit the smaller size. A more balanced logo was presented in 2016, with a larger fist and rose and the acronym "PS" scaled to the fist. The new version made space for ecological concerns, with the emblem and acronym superimposed on a large green leaf. The logo was updated again in 2024, with the leaves slightly tilted upwards, and the 2016 leaf placed behind the rose. The recommended version is single-colour, in magenta pink lines (or white on a pink background).

The political colour of the PS is not red, although this is used on the logo, but pink (French: rose). This is historically due to the strength of the French Communist Party (PCF), which also used red, and by distinction with which the PS is commonly displayed with a paler hue on graphics, a custom which settled in the 1970s.

=== Europe ===
==== Albania ====
The Socialist Party of Albania (PS or PSSh) uses the fist and rose, in José María Cruz Novillo's Spanish version. The present logo is displayed purple, the party colour. The party is affiliated to the SI.

==== Belarus ====
The emblem was formerly used by the Belarusian Social Democratic Assembly (BSDH).

==== Belgium ====
The emblem was picked up by the Belgian Socialist Party (PSB/BSP) in 1973, and maintained in French-speaking Belgium by the Socialist Party (PS) after the national party split on linguistic lines in 1978. The French-speaking PS is a member of the SI, as was the PSB/BSP. Vooruit, the present successor of the PSB/BSP in the Flemish Community, also remained SI-affiliated, but never used the fist and rose. A new logo with only a rose was presented in 1997, and was abandoned in 2002 under the leadership of Elio Di Rupo, to the dissatisfaction of some in the old generation of party members.

==== Bulgaria ====
The emblem is both: used by the Bulgarian Social Democratic Party (BSDP) in the same version as the SI, to which the party is not affiliated, and featured in a redrawn version on the logo of the Party of Bulgarian Social Democrats (PBSD), which is a member of the SI.

==== Denmark ====
In Denmark, the emblem was used by the Social Democrats from the late 1970s. Marc Bonnet claimed 140,000 kroner from the party in 1978 in exchange for a transfer of rights. The party was affiliated to the SI until 2017.

==== Germany ====
The fist and rose (German: Faust und Rose) has been used by the Young Socialists in the SPD (Jusos) since the 1970s, emphasizing the organization's more radical views than its parent party, the Social Democratic Party of Germany (SPD).

==== Iceland ====
In Iceland, the emblem was used by the Social Democratic Party (1916–2000). A logo with a rose only has been in use by the Social Democratic Alliance, into which it merged, since 2023.

==== Italy ====
In Italy, the Radical Party (PR) began using the fist and rose emblem (Italian: il pugno e la rosa) in the early 1970s, after party president Marco Pannella obtained the agreement of François Mitterrand. As often gleefully retold by Pannella, Giacomo Mancini, the secretary of the Italian Socialist Party (PSI), which was closer ideologically to the French PS and affiliated to the SI, was present as the same meeting and also wished to use the emblem but lacked internal party support to remove the traditional symbols, which included the Marxist hammer and sickle. Different designs adapted by Piergiorgio Maoloni were initially used, starting on the front page of the Liberazione newspaper in September 1973. Marc Bonnet's design became the official PR logo in 1976.

Bonnet sued the PR before the Rome Ordinary Tribunal in 1979 for using his design without his prior approval and infringing his intellectual property. The court sided with Bonnet, who had not been party to the political agreement between Mitterrand and the PR. The PR reached a financial settlement out of court with Bonnet to continue using it, against 60 million lire. In 1980, the PR decided to add a sign of mourning to its logo to pay homage to the part of humanity which was victim of hunger and war, reflecting its new internationalist platform. This took the form of a thick, diagonal black armband to lower right, obscuring part of the fist.

The emblem was abandoned in 1989 when the party moved away from electoral politics and transformed into the Transnational Radical Party (TRP). Although the TRP went with a different logo, the party, and other organizations in what has been referred to as the "radical galaxy", continued using the fist and rose emblem when running in elections, for example the Pannella List. In 1996, the Democratic Party of the Left (PDS), the successor to the Italian Communist Party (PCI) but affiliated with the Socialist International, explored the possibility of taking up the fist and rose, but was forbidden to do so by the TRP leadership, who stated that their party maintained the right to use it in Italy. The PR and its successor parties were never affiliated to the SI. In 2005–2007, a short-lived alliance in the Italian left was called the Rose in the Fist (Rosa nel Pugno, RnP), and used Bonnet's emblem. The Italian Radicals, a successor to the PR and an Italian constituent member of the TRP, were part of it. Different roses still appear in their logos.

==== Netherlands ====
In the Netherlands, the fist and rose was used by the Labour Party (PvdA) between the mid-1970s and 1994. The party was a member of the SI at the time, but left in the 2010s.

The version of the fist and rose emblem used by the PvdA

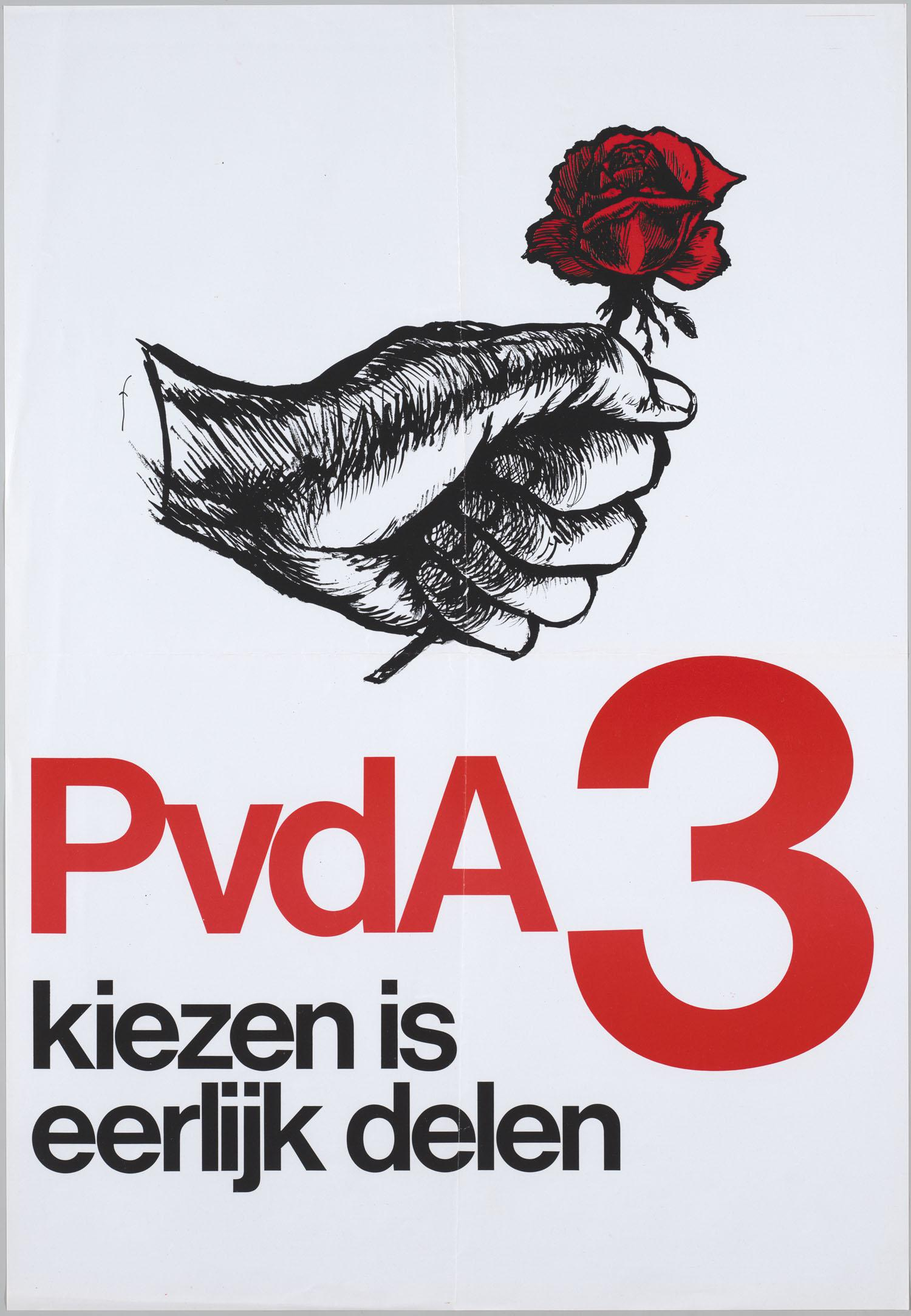
A 1974 municipal elections campaign poster featuring an early appearance of the fist and rose imagery

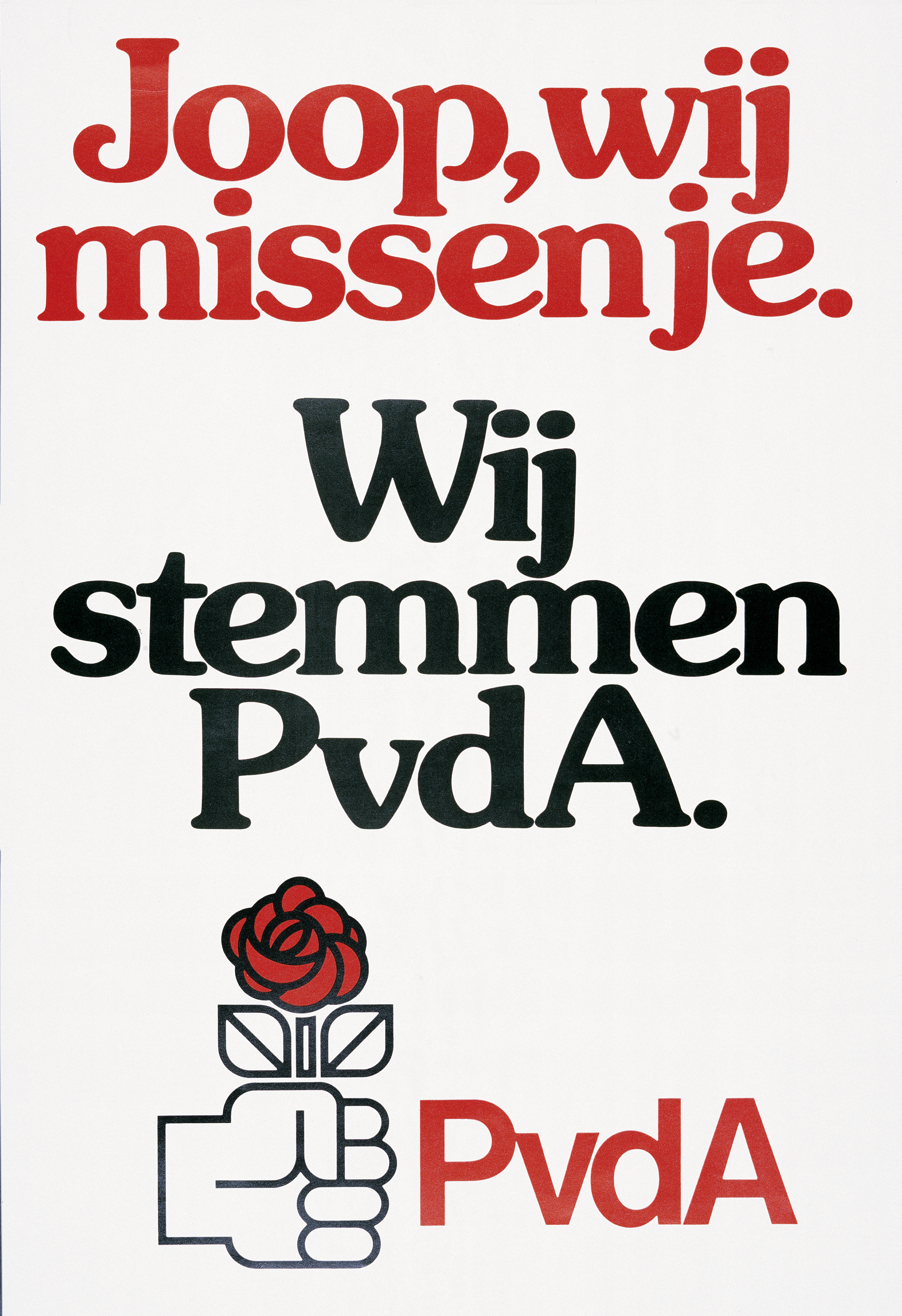
A 1978 provincial elections poster.

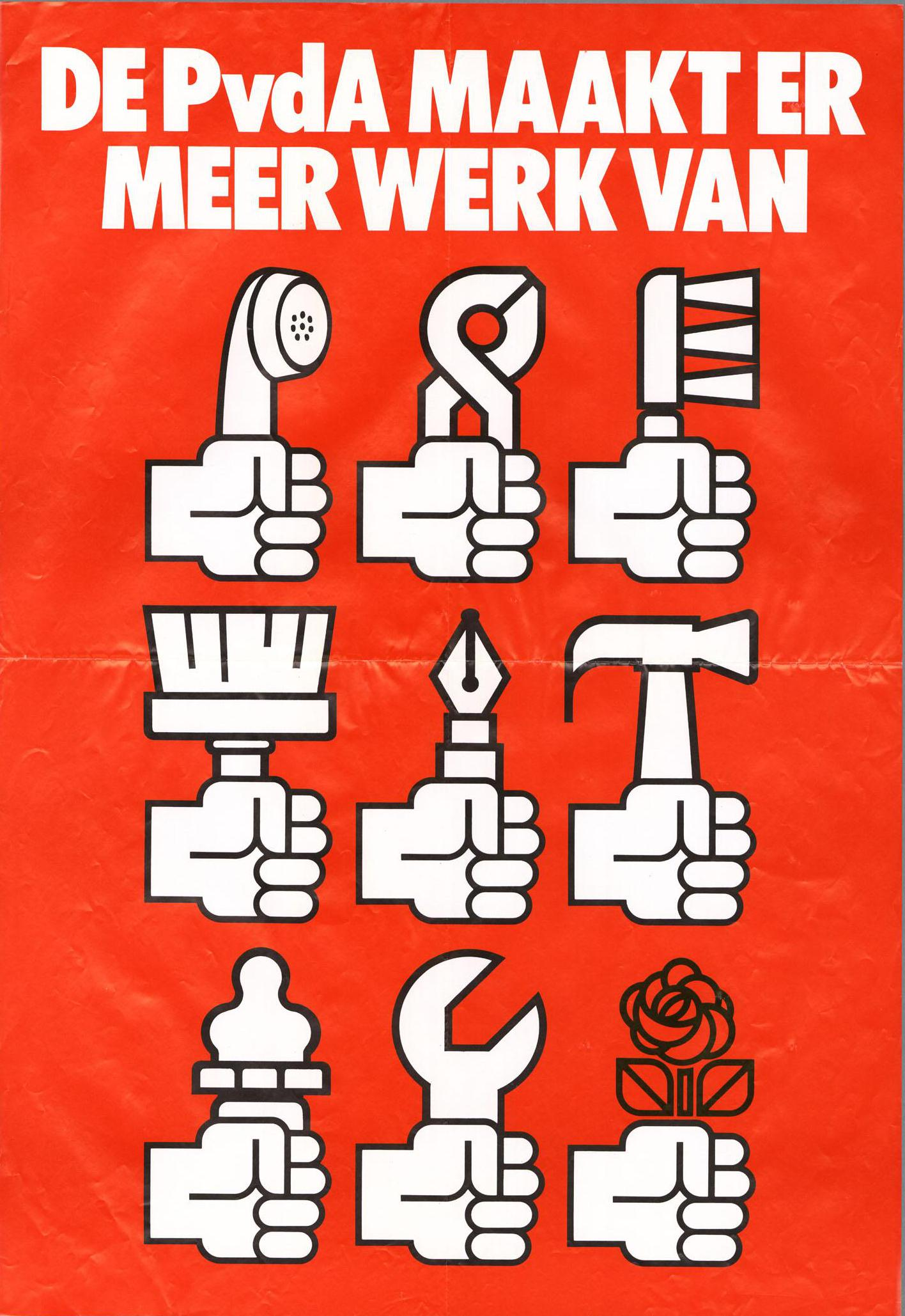
A 1981 general election poster featuring the fist holding symbols of various industries to appeal to diverse categories of workers

==== Russia ====
In Russia, the fist and rose was picked up by several social democratic parties and organizations since the dissolution of the Soviet Union. It was used, with or without the national flag, by the Social Democratic Party of Russia (SDPR), one of the first new political parties founded in 1990 following Perestroika, who joined the SI; it was deregistered by the government in 2002, and finally disbanded in 2011.

The fist and rose was then used by the Russian United Social Democratic Party (ROSDP), a short-lived centre-left party founded in 2000 by the former Soviet leader Mikhail Gorbachev, which laid it over the national flag. The next year, the party merged with the Russian Party of Social Democracy (PRSP) to form a new SDPR, who used the emblem of the PRSP, featuring a differently-designed rose and a hand supporting it rather than clenching it. Following the dissolution of the second SDPR in 2007, Gorbachev founded a non-governmental organization, the Union of Social Democrats (SSD), which used the fist and rose. A third SDPR, which also used it, was formed in 2012 with the support of Gorbatchev, who dissolved his SSD the next year; it was deregistered in 2019. Neither the ROSDP, nor the SSD, nor the third SDPR joined the SI, although the second SDPR was a consultative member.

The fist and rose is still used by the Russian Social Democratic Union of Youth (RSDUY), a youth organization initially formed as the youth wing of the ROSDP. It is a member of the International Union of Socialist Youth, an affiliate of the SI. The emblem of the Union of Democratic Socialists is a star, inside which is a photo of a fist clutching a rose.

==== Spain ====
The Spanish Socialist Workers' Party (PSOE) took up the fist and rose (Spanish: el puño y la rosa) in 1977. It uses a design redrawn by José María Cruz Novillo, on a commission by Guillermo Galeote, a member of the PSOE leadership, made at the time of the party's legalization during the transition to democracy. It replaced the party's prior emblem from the 1920s, a quill and an anvil, which symbolized the union of intellectual and manual workers.

Cruz Novillo, inspired by the Dutch PvdA version, used cleaner, more geometric shapes than Bonnet and more horizontal and vertical lines, expressing "order and modernity". He inverted the picture, so that a left hand would hold the rose; he later explained that this signalled a difference with communists, who usually raise their right fist. The PvdA version was first used in 1976–1977 by the party and El Socialista newspaper, before Cruz Novillo's version was released in time for the June 1977 general election campaign. It became the official party symbol in December of that year at the 27th Congress.

The PSOE is affiliated to the SI. PSOE-affiliated regional parties also use the emblem, sometimes with elements from the regional flag added to the design. The emblem was associated with the party's accession to government under Felipe González, and remained in use during José Luis Rodríguez Zapatero's time in office. A new logo drawn by Rafa Celda, featuring a simplified rose, was introduced in 1998, but widely criticized and called the "artichoke"; Cruz Novillo's logo was maintained for the 2000 general election campaign. It has increasingly been sidelined since the 2010s in favour of alternative symbols and designs, due to the rise of new, competing forces in Spanish politics, and to the increasing autonomy of regional socialist parties, who seek to differentiate from the national party. It was not used in the 2011 general election campaign; another simplified rose was introduced in 2013, but quickly retired, as was a new logo with no picture in 2015–2016. The Catalan PSC–PSOE set it aside in the 2021 regional election.

In 2017, the American fashion group Urban Outfitters used the Spanish version of the logo on one of its t-shirts, sparking protest from Cruz Novillo's son. The PSOE stated that it owns copyright on the picture, although it was not clear what rights the designer may have maintained. The company retired the t-shirt.

The logo of the PSOE used between 1977 and 1998

The variant used by the Catalan PSC between 1982 and 2023, featuring the flag of Catalonia

The 2023 version of the party logo, combining the fist and rose, the red square introduced in 2001, and the heart symbol introduced in 2019

==== Switzerland ====
The emblem is used by the Social Democratic Party of Switzerland (SP or PS) in French-speaking cantons, although not in German-speaking and Italian-speaking ones. The party was a member of the SI until withdrawing in 2017.

=== Africa ===
==== Algeria ====
In Algeria, the emblem is used by the Socialist Forces Front (FFS), a centre-left party affiliated with the SI.

==== Senegal ====
The emblem is used by the Socialist Party of Senegal (PS), affiliated to the SI.

=== America ===
==== Argentina ====
In Argentina, the Socialist Party (PS) has used the emblem alongside several others, sometimes with a narrow version of the flag of Argentina added to the end of the hand as a cuff. The party was formerly affiliated to the SI.

==== Brazil ====
In Brazil, the fist and rose (Portuguese: o punho e a rosa) has been used by the Democratic Labour Party (PDT) since its foundation in 1979. The party was admitted as a consultative member of the SI only in 1986, and as a full member in 1989. In the logo introduced in 2021, the leaves and stem bear the main colours of the flag of Brazil (yellow, blue and green). Party president Carlos Lupi stated that this was in response to the political use of the national flag by President Jair Bolsonaro.

==== Canada ====
In Canada, the NDP Socialist Caucus, a left-wing faction in the social democratic New Democratic Party (NDP), has used the Socialist International version of the fist and rose since the group's inception in 1998, though more recently it has used the same fist holding a red flag as an alternate logo. The NDP was affiliated with the SI until 2018. In Quebec, the Parti de la démocratie socialiste (PDS), until 1995 the New Democratic Party of Quebec (NPDQ) and until 1989 affiliated with the federal NDP, used the left-handed Spanish variant of the fist and rose from the late 1980s until its dissolution in 2002. A later iteration of the NPDQ, which existed between 2014 and 2024, did not use the fist and rose.

==== Chile ====
In Chile, the fist and rose was used by the Social Democratic Movement (MSD), formed in a secession from the Radical Party of Chile (PR) in 1979, and which eventually merged back into it in 1985. It was then used by the Chilean Social Democracy Party (SDCH) from its legalization in 1991, and, after 1994, in a largely redrawn version, by its successor the Social Democrat Radical Party (PSRD), today the new PR, which is affiliated to the SI.

==== Colombia ====
The social democratic wing of the Colombian Liberal Party (PLC) uses the fist and rose symbol.

==== Mexico ====
In Mexico, the short-lived Social Democracy party (1996–2000) used a largely redrawn and recoloured version of Bonnet's original design. It was not affiliated to the SI.

==== Paraguay ====
In Paraguay, the Revolutionary Febrerista Party (PRF) uses the logo of the SI, although turned to a right hand directed left.

==== Peru ====
In Peru, the fist and rose is used by the Socialist Party (PS).

==== United States ====
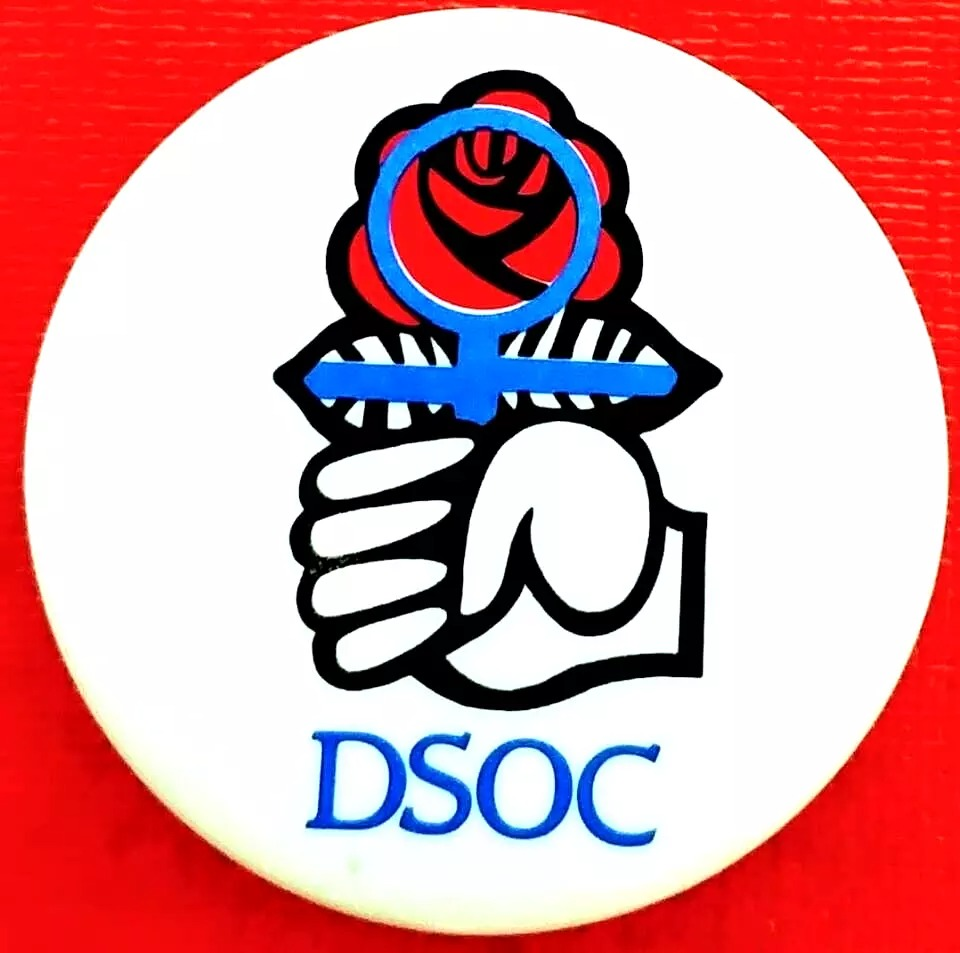
A 1976 pin of the Democratic Socialist Organizing Committee (DSOC), on which the fist also holds a Venus symbol, a gender symbol representing feminism

The Democratic Socialists of America (DSA) use a modified version, on which the clenched fist is replaced with two hands shaking. The hands are in white and black lines respectively, and some branches color the skins beige and brown, a reference to race and ethnicity issues and to the civil rights movement. The Democratic Socialist Organizing Committee (DSOC), one of the DSA's precursor organizations, had used the classic fist and rose. The DSA, as the DSOC before it, was a member of the SI, but left it in 2017. Some branches and section of the party use altered versions of the emblem. The two hands are redrawn to make a V sign in Los Angeles (DSA-LA), where they previously shook under a palm tree. The Queer Socialists Working Group fill the flower, or sometimes just the several parts of the leaves, with the colors of the rainbow flag (LGBT). Another derived logo displays the classic rose under three raised fists of different skin colors; it is used by the Palestine Solidarity Working Group.

=== Asia ===
==== Philippines ====
The fist and rose is used by the Partido Demokratiko Sosyalista ng Pilipinas (PDSP), affiliated to the SI.

=== Internationals ===
The emblem was picked up by the Socialist International (SI) in 1979, in a variant inspired from José María Cruz Novillo's 1977 Spanish version, although restored to a right hand directed left, and with the leaves coloured green. It may have been popularized at a joint rally of the PSOE and the Confederation of the Socialist Parties of the European Community (the present PES) in April 1977 in Madrid. The Party of European Socialists (PES), formed in 1992, did not take up the fist and rose, but chose an emblem known as the "rose with stars", associating the sole rose with the stars of the flag of Europe. Socialist International Women uses a version with two hands shaking. It was also formerly used by the International Union of Socialist Youth (IUSY), which is affiliated to the Socialist International.

== Design and symbolism ==
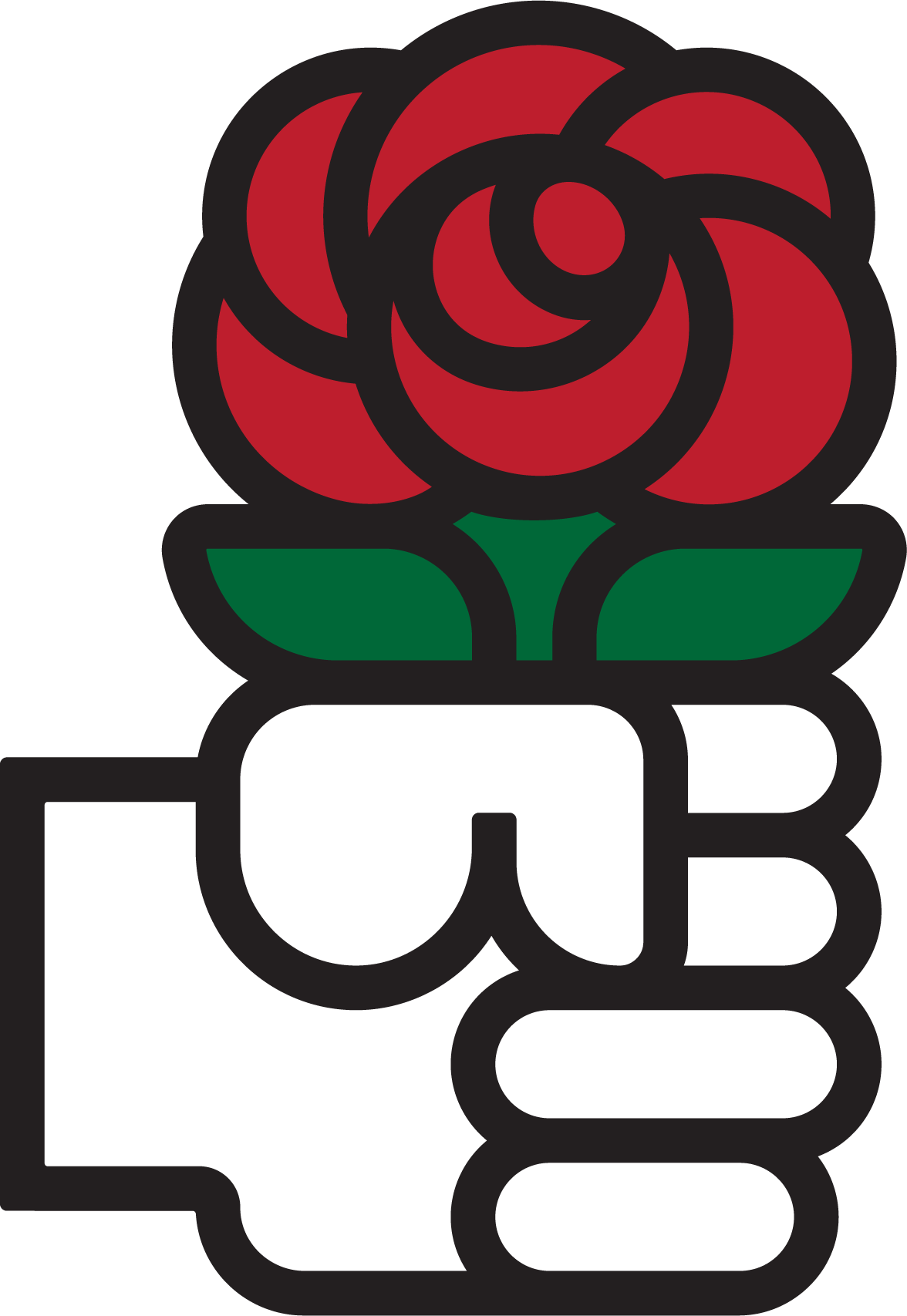
A version of the fist and rose derived from the 1977 Spanish variant, with the leaves coloured green

The emblem combines two political symbols, making it "a graphic synthesis of left-wing militant commitment":

- The raised fist, or clenched fist, is a long-standing rallying sign of solidarity, unity, determination, strength, and resistance, as well as a salute, popular in communist and socialist movements. It has often been used as a symbol, usually raised vertically, although the fist holding the rose is extended horizontally for graphical reasons. It was widely used by the German left in the 1920s, as well as by Republicans during the Spanish Civil War, and spread across Europe as a response to the fascist-appropriated Roman salute and the Nazi salute, and in France to the "V sign" of the Gaullist party. It was later used in defence of a number of minority or oppressed groups.
- The red rose has been a symbol of socialism since the 1880s, both in the European and the American traditions. Other red flowers were also common, such as the dog rose, especially in Belgium and France, or the carnation, especially in Italy, Portugal, and Spain.

Both symbols were popular with left-wing, revolutionary, and radical movements of the era, as well as in the counterculture of the 1960s. The flower, for example, was also inspired by the flower power ideas (passive resistance and nonviolence, especially in support of pacifism) which had emerged in the previous decade. The Ours research group owns posters of May 68 featuring a hand holding a flower, and mentions that the imagery had been used by anarchists in Spain and southern France in the 1960s. One historian suggests that the fist has similarities with the poster of the Woodstock festival (August 1969), which features a hand clenching a guitar. In the French PS, the emblem was sometimes known as the rose in the fist or the fist with a rose, before fist and rose became the preferred designation, to stress the balanced association between the two elements and what they stand for.

The symbolism, while evocative, is vague enough to enable varying interpretations depending on the country and on the party's political orientation. It was detailed in a 1979 communication brochure of the French PS: "It embodies both strength and sweetness, the labour world and the quality of life, dynamism and innovation, the resolution to fight and the will to change life, quantitative and qualitative concerns." PSOE politician Alfonso Guerra, in his Dictionary of the Left, tones down the symbolism of the fist as "the strength …—of labour, of workers", rather than as a reference to the revolution, and that of the rose to "the sensibility of culture, of thought, of beauty". The imagery inspired Ola Enstad's controversial 4,8m public sculpture Neve med rose (Fist With Rose, 1991), located in the Lilletorget square in Oslo.

Broader and more elusive symbolism may be seen in the fist and rose. It associates manly (the fist) and feminine (the rose) imagery. The red rose, which is the favourite flower of French people, is associated with passion and love in the language of flowers. Bonnet's design of the flower and its leaves pointing left and right can also remind of a Christian cross. An ambiguous element of the symbolism is that clenching a rose may be bloody, since the flower has thorns. A fist clenching something also appears on the arm and hammer, an ancient symbol of industry, which was used by some left-wing parties, for example the Socialist Labor Party of America (SLP). The rose is displayed in the red colour associated with left-wing politics since the Revolutions of 1848, prominently used in the red flag. More recent variations display the leaves in green, reflecting the rise of environmental concerns. In Marc Bonnet's version, the fist is a right hand, directed left. The PvdA and PSOE versions inverted the design, with a left hand directed right; José María Cruz Novillo later explained that this was intended to signal a difference from communists, who usually raise their right fist. The original design uses bold, black lines, making the emblem simple, but strong, while a number of later variations use thinner lines, and reminds of the style of bande dessinée comics.

== Intellectual property ==
It was indicated in the 1979 Italian court case that Marc Bonnet trademarked his design worldwide on 14 August 1974, and was paid for its use in several countries. He received 50,000 francs from the French PS on 22 May 1975 in exchange for a transfer of rights, in France or abroad, retroactive to 1970, but reserved his rights regarding the use of the emblem, without his prior authorization, by any foreign socialist party or any other party with which the PS had no affiliation. The Italian PR paid him a higher amount (60 million lire) in 1980. In response to suggestions of plagiarism by Urban Outfitters and by the Albanian PSSh, the PSOE stated that it owned copyright on the Spanish version, although it was not clear if the designer José María Cruz Novillo also maintained rights over it.

== Alternative and related designs ==
A different fist and rose emblem on the logo of the Young Socialists Switzerland.

Some parties and organizations use a fist and rose emblem, although in an unrelated design, for example the Indonesian Solidarity Party (PSI), the Social Democratic Party of Hungary (MSZDP), the Patriotic Union of Kurdistan (PUK), Social Party Imberakuri (PS-Imberakuri), Organized Socialist Party in Venezuela (PSOEV) or the Young Socialists Switzerland (Juso/JS/GS). When it gave it up, the Dutch PvdA switched to a new logo in which a small raised fist is drawn by the central petals of the rose. The Korean Social Democratic Party uses a rose with a similar leave pattern. The Green Party of Timor used a logo based on PSI's logo.

=== Parodies ===
The fist and rose's bold and evocative symbolism lends itself to occasional parodies, caricature, or attacks against the associated parties, which is sometimes done by the parties themselves as a show of humour and self-deprecation. For example, during the 2015 Spanish local elections, the PSOE temporarily changed its logo to the Cruz Novillo fist redrawn as a thumb signal, accompanying the slogan "I say yes".

=== Other left-wing emblems ===
Many other socialist, social democratic, or labour parties, movements, and organizations across the world use or have used a red rose in their logo. Centre-leaning and moderate parties tend to use a red rose alone, doing away with the revolutionary heritage of the raised fist. The fist and rose has sometimes been laid on an alternative graphic identification shared by left-wing parties in several countries, a plain red square with white text, for example in Spain (2001 to 2013; since 2023), or in French-speaking Switzerland (since 2009). The plain red square first appeared in the Social Democratic Party of Germany (SPD) in 1972 and became the official party logo in 1991; it is popular with parties converted to the Third Way.

== See also ==
- Floral emblem
- List of ideological symbols
- Political symbolism
  - Communist symbolism
  - Socialist-style emblems

== Sources ==
- Cépède, Frédéric (January–March 1996). "« Le poing et la rose », la saga d'un logo". Vingtième Siècle. Revue d'histoire (in French). 49. Paris: Sciences Po: 18–30. doi:10.3406/xxs.1996.3481. ISSN 0294-1759 – via Persée.
- Cépède, Frédéric (September–December 2018). "« Le poing et la rose », un symbole devenu encombrant ? Retour sur la saga d'un logo (1970-2017)". Histoire@Politique (in French). 36 (36). Paris: Sciences Po. doi:10.4000/histoirepolitique.5984. ISSN 1954-3670 – via OpenEdition Journals.
- Serra, Gautier; Ourvoie, Amaël (12 June 2021). "L'histoire du logo du Parti socialiste avec Évelyn Soum et Francis Sorin". L’Entrevue. Episode 3 (in French). Paris: Groupe socialiste universitaire. Duration 64 min – via YouTube.
- Soum, Évelyne (12 January 2021). "Yann Berriet et « le poing et la rose »" (in French). Paris: Fondation Jean-Jaurès.
