= Issy-les-Moulineaux Congress =

French Socialist Party 1969 national congress

The Issy-les-Moulineaux Congress was the second national congress of the French Socialist Party (Parti socialiste or PS). It took place in July 1969, under the new leadership of Alain Savary. This marked the transformation of the old French Section of the Workers' International (SFIO) into the new PS. However, François Mitterrand's Convention of Republican Institutions did not attend.

Jean Poperen, expelled from the Unified Socialist Party, joined the PS.
