= Bourget Congress =

The Bourget Congress was the sixteenth national congress of the French Socialist Party (Parti socialiste or PS). It took place from 22 to 24 October 1993. The Refoundation Motion supported by Michel Rocard, Lionel Jospin, and Laurent Fabius won.

== Results ==
Popular vote
Refoundation Motion	82.27%
Poperen Motion	11.14%
Dumas-Mermaz Motion	6.60%

Michel Rocard was elected as First Secretary.
