= Union of Socialist Groups and Clubs =

Union of Socialist Groups and Clubs Union des groupes et clubs socialistes
- Abbreviation: UGCS
- Leader: Jean Poperen
- Founded: October 6, 1967
- Dissolved: July 13, 1969
- Split from: Unified Socialist Party
- Merged into: Socialist Party
- Ideology: Socialism
- Political position: Left-wing
- National affiliation: FGDS (1967–1968)

The Union of Socialist Groups and Clubs (French: Union des groupes et clubs socialistes, UGCS) was a socialist club in France led by Jean Poperen after he was expelled from the Unified Socialist Party. The UGCS joined the Federation of the Democratic and Socialist Left before merging into the new PS at the Issy-les-Moulineaux Congress.
