= Alfortville Congress =

The Alfortville Congress was the founding national congress of the French Socialist Party. It took place on 4 May 1969. The old French Section of the Workers' International (SFIO) expanded to include Alain Savary's Union of Clubs for the Renewal of the Left (UCRG) and dissident from François Mitterrand's Convention of Republican Institutions (CIR).
