= Union of Clubs for the Renewal of the Left =

Union of Clubs for the Renewal of the Left Union des clubs pour le renouveau de la gauche
- Abbreviation: UCRG
- Leader: Alain Savary; Pierre Bérégovoy
- Secretary-General: Jacques-Antoine Gau
- Founded: February 2, 1966
- Dissolved: May 4, 1969
- Merger of: Socialisme et Démocratie; Démocratie Nouvelle; Association des Jeunes cadres Cercle Tocqueville
- Merged into: Socialist Party
- Ideology: Socialism
- Political position: Left-wing
- National affiliation: FGDS

The Union of Clubs for the Renewal of the Left (French: Union des clubs pour le renouveau de la gauche, UCRG) was a socialist club in France led by Alain Savary.

The UCRG included clubs led by Alain Savary and Pierre Bérégovoy. The UCRG joined the Federation of the Democratic and Socialist Left before merging into the new PS at the Alfortville Congress.
