= Federation of the Democratic and Socialist Left =

Federation of the Democratic and Socialist Left Fédération de la gauche démocrate et socialiste
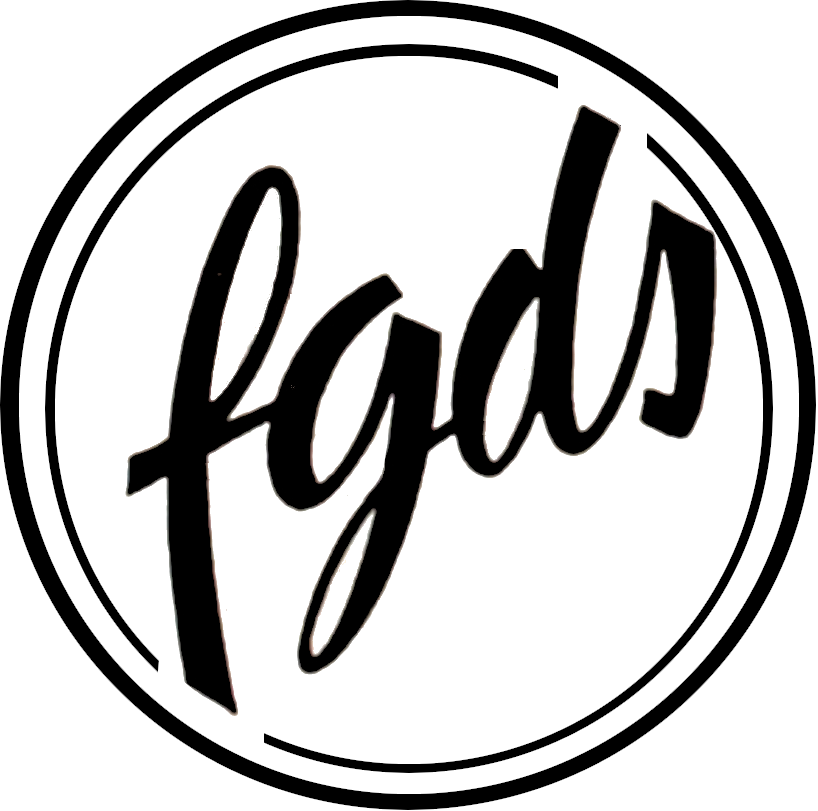
- Abbreviation: FGDS
- Leader: François Mitterrand
- Founded: September 10, 1965
- Dissolved: November 7, 1968
- Succeeded by: Socialist Party
- Ideology: Socialism; Factions: Democratic socialism Radicalism; Social liberalism Republicanism
- Political position: Centre-left to left-wing

The Federation of the Democratic and Socialist Left (Fédération de la gauche démocrate et socialiste or FGDS) was a conglomerate of French left-wing non-Communist forces. It was founded to support François Mitterrand's candidature at the 1965 presidential election and to counterbalance the Communist preponderance over the French left.

== Members ==
It was composed of:

- the SFIO Socialist party led by Guy Mollet
- the Radical Party headed by René Billères
- the Convention of Republican Institutions (CIR) of François Mitterrand
- the Union of Socialist Groups and Clubs (UGCS) of Jean Poperen
- the Union of Clubs for the Renewal of the Left of Alain Savary

== History ==
Before the beginning of the 1965 presidential campaign, the non-Communist left was divided. The Socialist Gaston Defferre proposed the creation of a "Great Federation" gathering the center-left and the center-right parties in order to resist to the Gaullist domination over the country and to the leading role of the French Communist Party (PCF) over the opposition. He wanted to be its candidate for the presidency. However, this project failed in due to the objections of the Socialist and Christian-Democrat leaders.

François Mitterrand then proposed to be candidate with a strategy of union between the left-wing forces, including the PCF. This one accepted to support his candidature. Nevertheless, in order to talk on an equal footing with the Communists, he advocated the constitution of a federation of the left-wing non-Communist forces. This strategy was confirmed by the relatively good electoral result of Mitterrand, who succeeded to prevent a re-election of De Gaulle in the first round, and obtained 45% of the votes against him in the second round. Furthermore, the PCF/FGDS electoral agreements permitted to shrink the Gaullist parliamentary majority after the 1967 legislative election. But the FGDS was divided about question of the relations with the PCF which demanded the elaboration of a common platform.

During the May 68 events, François Mitterrand announced his candidature for an anticipated presidential election. He thought Charles de Gaulle would resign after the crisis. Finally, de Gaulle dissolved the National Assembly and his followers won the June 1968 legislative election. Held as responsible for the failure, Mitterrand resigned in November 1968 and the FGDS dissolved itself. Mitterrand then undertook to conquer the Socialist Party (PS) which succeeded to the SFIO in 1969.

== Election results ==
=== Presidential ===
President of the French Republic
Election	Candidate	First round		Second round		Result
Election	Candidate	Votes	%	Votes	%	Result
1965	François Mitterrand	7,694,005	31.72%	10,619,735	44.80%	Lost

=== National Assembly ===
National Assembly
Election year	Leader	1st round		2nd round		Seats	+/−	Government
Election year	Leader	Votes	%	Votes	%	Seats	+/−	Government
1967	François Mitterrand	4,224,110	18.96%	4,505,329	24.08%	117 / 491	▲14	Opposition
1968	François Mitterrand	3,660,250	16.53%	3,097,338	21.25%	57 / 487	▼60	Opposition
