= Epinay Congress =

Third national congress of the French Socialist Party

The Epinay Congress was the third national congress of the French Socialist Party (Parti socialiste or PS), which took place on 11, 12 and 13 June 1971, in the town of Épinay-sur-Seine, in the northern suburbs of Paris. During this congress, not only did the party admit the Convention of Republican Institutions (Convention des institutions républicaines or CIR, a federation of left-wing republican groups led by François Mitterrand) into its ranks, but the party leadership was also won by Mitterrand and his supporters. For the observers and the French Socialists themselves, the Epinay Congress was the real founding act of the current PS. It was also the turning point in Mitterrand's grand political plan, which led to the ascendancy of the French Left over the next quarter-century, and eventually, in 1981, to Mitterrand's election to the Presidency of France for two consecutive 7-year terms.

== History ==
After the catastrophic results of the 1968 legislative election and of the 1969 presidential election, the secretary general of the French Section of the Workers' International (socialist party, SFIO) Guy Mollet resigned. The party merged with several centre-left clubs. The leader of one of these groups, Alain Savary, was elected first secretary of the new Socialist Party (PS).

Supported by Mollet's circle, he tried to convince the internal opponents of his will of change. However, these opponents were themselves divided about the strategy of the party. The right-wing, led by Pierre Mauroy and Gaston Defferre, was composed of some local elects who made alliances with the centrist parties, whereas the left-wing CERES faction led by Jean-Pierre Chevènement wanted to accelerate the process of an alliance with the French Communist Party (PCF). The Communists were the largest party of the French left at the time and advocated the unity of the French left around a Common Programme. Savary found a compromise between the PS factions: it was agreed to begin an "ideological dialogue" with the PCF. This dialogue was seen as a paving of the way towards an eventual electoral coalition with the Communists. The general principle of the "Union of the Left" was adopted, but the alliance with centrist parties was tolerated in some local assemblies.

Mitterrand and the CIR, which joined the PS in Epinay, advocated immediate negotiations with the PCF in order to write a common election programme. Indeed, Mittterrand was candidate of the Left, supported by Socialists and Communists, in the 1965 presidential election.

The will to overthrow Savary and Mollet's group from the leadership of the party permitted the birth of a broad coalition between the Mitterrand, Defferre, Mauroy and Chevènement factions. It united against the proposition of Savary to change the ballot system for the election of the leading committee (the "parliament" of the party). Then, it elected Mitterrand to the first secretaryship with 51.3% of the vote against 48.7% for Savary and Mollet. This Congress was described as a premeditated plot, prepared by Mitterrand, Mauroy, Defferre and Chevènement beforehand.

Mitterrand became the new PS first secretary and in the following year signed the Common Programme with the Communist Party and the Movement of the Radical-Socialist Left.

Mitterrand clinched the party leadership with a very radical speech, a strategy often used in French socialist congresses:

"Reform or revolution? I feel like saying, yes, revolution [...] Violent or peaceful, a revolution is first of all a break [...] Whoever does not want the break with the established order [...] with capitalist society, cannot be a member of the Socialist Party".

His project to ally with the Communist Party in order to replace it as main left-wing party became obvious when he said, during the congress:

"I think it is not normal: that 5 million Frenchwomen and Frenchmen choose the Communist Party".

== Results ==
Popular vote
Savary-Mollet	34%
Mauroy-Defferre	30%
Mitterrand	15%
Jean Poperen	12%
CÉRÉS	8.5%
Christian left	0.5%

Popular vote
Mitterrand-Mauroy-Defferre-CÉRÉS	51.27%
Savary-Mollet-Jean Poperen	48.73%

François Mitterrand was elected as First Secretary.
