= Socialist Party (France) =

French political party

Socialist Party Parti socialiste
- Abbreviation: PS
- First Secretary: Olivier Faure
- President in the National Assembly: Boris Vallaud
- President in the Senate: Patrick Kanner
- Founders: François Mitterrand; Alain Savary
- Founded: 4 May 1969; 57 years ago
- Merger of: See list: SFIO CIR UCRG UGCS
- Headquarters: 45 boulevard Saint-Martin, 75003 Paris
- Newspaper: Le Populaire (1969–1970)
- Youth wing: Young Socialists
- LGBT wing: Homosexualités et Socialisme
- Membership (2024): ▲47,000
- Ideology: Social democracy Progressivism; Pro-Europeanism
- Political position: Centre-left to left-wing
- National affiliation: New Popular Front (since 2024); NUPES (2022–2024)
- Regional affiliation: PSOM (historical)
- European affiliation: Party of European Socialists
- European Parliament group: Progressive Alliance of Socialists and Democrats
- International affiliation: Progressive Alliance; Socialist International
- Colours: Pink and green
- Anthem: Il faut tourner la page ('We must turn the page') (since 2010) (Note: Previously "Changer la vie" ('Changing life') from 1977 until 2010.)
- National Assembly: 65 / 577
- Senate: 63 / 348
- European Parliament: 10 / 81
- Presidency of Regional Councils: 5 / 17
- Presidency of Departmental Councils: 22 / 95

Website
- parti-socialiste.fr

The Socialist Party (French: Parti socialiste [paʁti sɔsjalist], PS (Note: French pronunciation: [pe ɛs])) is a centre-left to left-wing political party in France. It holds social democratic and pro-European views. The PS was for decades the largest party of the "French Left" and used to be one of the two major political parties under the Fifth Republic, along with the Rally for the Republic in the late 20th century, and with the Union for a Popular Movement in the early 2000s. It is currently led by First Secretary Olivier Faure. The PS is a member of the Party of European Socialists, Progressive Alliance and Socialist International.

The PS was founded in 1969 from a merger of the French Section of the Workers' International (SFIO), the Convention of Republican Institutions led by François Mitterrand, and other groups. In the 1970s, the PS surpassed the Communist Party's share of the left-wing vote. It first won power in 1981, when Mitterrand was elected president. The PS achieved a governing majority in the National Assembly from 1981 to 1986, and again from 1988 to 1993. PS leader Lionel Jospin lost his bid to succeed Mitterrand as president in 1995 to conservative Jacques Chirac, but he served as prime minister in a cohabitation government from 1997 to 2002, when he was again defeated by Chirac in the presidential election.

In the 2007 presidential election, the PS's candidate, Ségolène Royal, was defeated by conservative Nicolas Sarkozy. In 2012, François Hollande, the leader of the party from 1997 to 2008, was elected president, and the party also won a governing majority. During his term, Hollande battled with high unemployment, multiple Jihadi terrorist attacks, poor opinion ratings and a splinter group of Socialist MPs known as frondeurs (rebels). Facing the emergence of centrist Emmanuel Macron and left-winger Jean-Luc Mélenchon, PS candidate Benoît Hamon finished 5th in the 2017 presidential election. The PS also declined to the 4th largest party in the 2017 legislative election, and to the 6th largest in 2022.

Several figures who acted at the international level have also been members of the PS, including Jacques Delors, who was the president of the European Commission from 1985 to 1994 and the first person to serve three terms in that office; Dominique Strauss-Kahn, who was the managing director of the International Monetary Fund from 2007 to 2011; and Pascal Lamy, who was Director-General of the World Trade Organization from 2005 to 2013. Party membership has declined precipitously, to a low of 22,000 members in 2021, down from 173,486 members in 2012, although it claimed 47,000 members in 2024, recovering to its standing around 2016, when it had 42,300 members.

== History ==
=== French socialist movement and the SFIO ===
The defeat of the Paris Commune (1871) greatly reduced the power and influence of the socialist movements in France. Its leaders were killed or exiled. France's first socialist party, the Federation of the Socialist Workers of France (FTSF), was founded in 1879. It was characterised as "possibilist" because it promoted gradual reforms. Two parties split off from it: in 1882, the French Workers' Party (POF) of Jules Guesde and Paul Lafargue (the son-in-law of Karl Marx), then in 1890 the Revolutionary Socialist Workers' Party (POSR) of Jean Allemane. At the same time, the heirs of Louis Auguste Blanqui, a symbol of the French revolutionary tradition, created the Central Revolutionary Committee (CRC) led by Édouard Vaillant. There were also some declared socialist deputies such as Alexandre Millerand and Jean Jaurès who did not belong to any party.

In 1899, the participation of Millerand in Pierre Waldeck-Rousseau's cabinet caused a debate about socialist participation in a "bourgeois government". Three years later, Jaurès, Allemane and the possibilists founded the possibilist French Socialist Party, which supported participation in government, while Guesde and Vaillant formed the Socialist Party of France, which opposed such co-operation. In 1905, during the Globe Congress, the two groups merged in the French Section of the Workers' International (SFIO). Leader of the parliamentary group and director of the party paper L'Humanité, Jaurès was its most influential figure.

The party was hemmed in between the middle-class liberals of the Radical Party and the revolutionary syndicalists who dominated the trade unions. Furthermore, the goal to rally all the Socialists in one single party was partially reached: some elects refused to join the SFIO and created the Republican-Socialist Party, which supported socialist participation in liberal governments. Together with the Radicals, who wished to install laicism, the SFIO was a component of the Left Block (Bloc des gauches) without to sit in the government. In 1906, the General Confederation of Labour trade union claimed its independence from all political parties.

The French socialists were strongly anti-war, but following the assassination of Jaurès in 1914 they were unable to resist the wave of militarism which followed the outbreak of World War I. They suffered a severe split over participation in the wartime government of national unity. In 1919 the anti-war socialists were heavily defeated in elections. In 1920, during the Tours Congress, the majority and left wing of the party broke away and formed the French Section of the Communist International (SFIC) to join the Third International founded by Vladimir Lenin. The right wing, led by Léon Blum, kept the "old house" and remained in the SFIO.

In 1924 and in 1932, the Socialists joined with the Radicals in the Coalition of the Left (Cartel des Gauches), but refused to join the non-Socialist governments led by the Radicals Édouard Herriot and Édouard Daladier. These governments failed because the Socialists and the Radicals could not agree on economic policy, and also because the Communists, following the policy laid down by the Soviet Union, refused to support governments presiding over capitalist economies. The question of the possibility of a government participation with Radicals caused the split of "neosocialists" at the beginning of the 1930s. They merged with the Republican-Socialist Party in the Socialist Republican Union.

In 1934, the Communists changed their line, and the four left-wing parties came together in the Popular Front, which won the 1936 elections and brought Blum to power as France's first SFIO prime minister. Indeed, for the first time in its history, the SFIO obtained more votes and seats than the Radical Party and it formed the central axis of a left-wing parliamentary majority. Within a year, however, his government collapsed over economic policy and also over the issue of the Spanish Civil War. The fall of the Popular Front caused a new split from the SFIO, with the departure of the left wing of the party, led by Marceau Pivert, to the Workers and Peasants' Socialist Party. The demoralised Left fell apart and was unable to resist the collapse of the French Third Republic after the military defeat of 1940.

After the liberation of France in 1944, the SFIO re-emerged in a coalition with a powerful French Communist Party (PCF), which became the largest left-wing party, and the Christian democratic Popular Republican Movement (MRP). This alliance installed the main elements of the French welfare state and the French Fourth Republic, but it did not survive the Cold War. In May 1947, the Socialist Prime Minister Paul Ramadier dismissed the Communist ministers. Blum proposed the construction of a Third Force with the centre-left and the centre-right, against the Gaullists and the Communists. However, his candidate to lead of the SFIO, Daniel Mayer, was defeated by Guy Mollet.

Mollet was supported by the left wing of the party. Paradoxically, he spoke a Marxist language without questioning the alliance with the centre and the centre-right. His leadership was shaken when the party divided in 1954 about the European Defence Community. Half of the SFIO parliamentary group voted "no", against the instructions of the party leaders. This led to the failure of the project. But later, Mollet got involved the SFIO in the build of a centre-left coalition, the Republican Front, which won a plurality in the 1956 elections. Consequently, he was prime minister at the head of a minority government. But the party was in decline, as were the Radicals, and the left never came close to forming a united front. Indeed, this led Mollet to assert, "the Communist Party is not on the left, but in the East". The repressive policy of Mollet in the Algerian War and his support for Charles de Gaulle's come-back in 1958 (the party lead called to vote "yes" in referendum on Fifth Republic's constitution) caused a split and the foundation of the dissident Unified Socialist Party (PSU). The SFIO returned to opposition in 1959. Discredited by its fluctuating policy during the Fourth Republic, it reached its lowest ebb in the 1960s.

Both because of its opposition to the principle of presidential election by universal suffrage and because De Gaulle's re-election appeared inevitable, the SFIO did not nominate a candidate for the 1965 presidential election. Consequently, it supported the candidacy of François Mitterrand, a former minister of the Fourth Republic who had been a conservative, then a leftist independent. He was resolutely anti-Gaullist. Supported by all the left-wing parties, he obtained a good result and faced De Gaulle in an unexpected second ballot, becoming the leader of the non-Communist left.

In order to exist between the Communist Party, leading the left, and the Gaullist Party, leading the country, the SFIO, Radicals, and left-wing republican groups created the Federation of the Democratic and Socialist Left under Mitterrand's leadership. But unable to benefit from the May 1968 events, it imploded after its disastrous defeat at the June 1968 legislative elections. One year later, the SFIO candidate Gaston Defferre was eliminated in the first round of the 1969 presidential election, with only 5% of votes.

=== Foundation of the PS and the Union of the Left (1969–1981) ===
Logo of the PS

In 1969, during the Alfortville Congress, the SFIO was replaced by the Socialist Party (Parti socialiste or PS). It was joined by pro-Pierre Mendès-France clubs (Union of Clubs for the Renewal of the Left led by Alain Savary) and left-wing republican groups (Union of Socialist Groups and Clubs of Jean Poperen). During the Issy-les-Moulineaux Congress, Alain Savary was elected First Secretary with the support of his predecessor Guy Mollet. He proposed an "ideological dialogue" with the Communists. The new party inherited the old daily Le Populaire from the SFIO, but it ceased publication soon after on 28 February 1970.

Two years later, during the Epinay Congress, pro-François Mitterrand clubs (Convention of Republican Institutions), joined the party. Mitterrand defeated the Savary-Mollet duo by proposing an electoral programme with the Communists and took the lead. A new emblem, the fist and rose, was adopted to signal change in 1971. In 1972, the Common Programme was signed with the PCF and Radical Party of the Left. During the Socialist International conference, he explained the alliance of left-wing parties is a yearning of French left-wing voters. In this, the goal of his strategy was "to regain 3 million of the 5 million of PCF voters". The left, and notably the Socialist Party, experienced an electoral recovery at the 1973 legislative election. Mitterrand, the candidate of the left-wing alliance, came close to winning the 1974 presidential election. Indeed, he obtained 49.2% of votes in the second round.

At the end of 1974, some PSU members, including leader Michel Rocard, re-joined the PS. They represented the "left-wing Christian" and non-Marxist group. The most conservative members of the PS, they advocated an alignment of French socialism along the lines of European social democracy, that is, a clear acceptance of the market economy. While the "Union of the Left" triumphed at the 1977 municipal election, the electoral rise of the PS worried the Communist Party. The two parties failed to update the Common Programme and the PCF leader Georges Marchais denounced a "turn towards the Right" of the PS.

In spite of positive polls, the "Union of the Left" lost the 1978 legislative election. For the first time since 1936, the Socialists scored better in the polls than the Communists, becoming the main left-wing party, but their defeat caused an internal crisis. Mitterrand's leadership was challenged by Rocard, who wanted to abandon the Common Programme which he considered archaic and unrealistic. Mitterrand felt that the left could not win without the alliance between the Socialists and the Communists. In 1979, Mitterrand won the Metz Congress, then, despite Rocard's popularity, was chosen as PS candidate for the 1981 presidential election.

Three major tendencies or factions emerged within the PS by the end of the Seventies. One was represented by the Mitterrandists who wanted reform but not a complete break with capitalism. A second faction was led by Michel Rocard and his supporters, who sought social democracy with a strong measure of autogestion, while a third faction formed around Jean-Pierre Chevènement and the CERES group which stood for revolutionary socialism.

=== Mitterrand's presidency and the exercise of power (1981–1995) ===
In 1981, Mitterrand defeated the incumbent conservative, Valéry Giscard d'Estaing, to become the first socialist of the Fifth Republic to be elected President of France by universal suffrage. He dissolved the National Assembly and, for the first time in their history, the French Socialists won an absolute majority of the seats. This landslide victory for the Socialists took place to the detriment of the right-wing parliamentary parties (Rally for the Republic and Union for French Democracy), as well as the Communist Party.

Mitterrand attempted to carry out socialist-inspired reforms (the 110 Propositions), furthering the dirigiste economic planning trends of the preceding conservative governments. The prime minister Pierre Mauroy nationalised the banks, the insurance industry and the defence industries, in accordance with the 1972 Common Program. Workers' wages were increased and working hours reduced to 39, and many other sweeping reforms carried out, but the economic crisis continued. Reforms included the abolition of death penalty, creation of a solidarity tax on wealth (ISF), introduction of proportional representation in legislative elections (which was applied only at the 1986 election), decentralization of the state (1982–83 laws), repeal of price liberalization for books (Lang Law of 1981), etc.

As early as 1982, Mitterrand faced a clear choice between maintaining France's membership in the European Monetary System, and thus the country's commitment to European integration, and pursuing his socialist reforms. He chose the former, starting the Socialist Party's acceptance of the status quo. In 1984, Mitterrand and his second prime minister, Laurent Fabius, clearly abandoned any further socialist measures. The "Union of the Left" died and the Communist ministers resigned. Although there were two periods of mild economic reflation (first from 1984 to 1986 and again from 1988 to 1990), monetary and fiscal restraint was the essential policy orientation of the Mitterrand presidency from 1983 onwards.

The PS lost its majority in the French National Assembly in 1986, forcing Mitterrand to "cohabit" with the conservative government of Jacques Chirac. Nevertheless, Mitterrand was re-elected president in 1988 with a moderate programme entitled "United France". He proposed neither nationalisations nor privatisations. He chose as prime minister the most popular and moderate of the Socialist politicians, Michel Rocard. His cabinet included four centre-right ministers but it was supported by only a plurality in the National Assembly elected in June 1988.

During his second term, Mitterrand focused on foreign policy and European integration. He convened a referendum for the ratification of the Maastricht Treaty. He left domestic policy to his prime ministers: Michel Rocard, Édith Cresson and Pierre Bérégovoy. The party was hit by scandals about its financing and weakened by the struggle between the heirs of "Mitterrandism".

In 1990, during the Rennes Congress, the "Mitterrandist group" split between the supporters of Laurent Fabius and the friends of Lionel Jospin. Furthermore, a part of the left wing of the party, led by Jean-Pierre Chevènement split off due to his opposition to the Gulf War and the Maastricht Treaty. This section created the Citizen and Republican Movement (MDC). Finally, many on the left were disappointed by the results of the Socialist governments. At the 1993 legislative election, the PS did poorly, returning to the levels of the SFIO in the 1960s. The Socialist group of the National Assembly numbered 53 deputies against 260 during the previous term.

Rocard became First Secretary of the party, and was considered the "natural candidate" for the next presidential election. He called for a political "big bang", an agreement with the centre and the centre-right, but his efforts were in vain. One year later, his party obtained only 14% of votes at the 1994 European Parliament election. He was overthrown by a motley coalition led by Henri Emmanuelli, a "Mitterrandist" left-winger. One year before the 1995 presidential election, the PS was affected by a leadership crisis. Rocard lost the most part of his followers after his 1994 electoral crash, Fabius was weakened by the infected blood scandal, the presidentiability of Emannuelli was questioned. The hope of some party members transferred to Jacques Delors, president of the European Commission and a favourite according to the polls, but he declined due to the radicalisation of the party which prevented his centrist strategy. Finally, Lionel Jospin, who had announced his political retirement after the loss of his parliamentary seat in 1993, came back and proposed to "take stock" of Mitterrand's inheritance. For the first time, the party members were called to nominate their candidate for presidency. Benefiting from a good image in the polls, a strong loyalty to the party (as former First Secretary) and governmental experience (as former Education Minister, and the teachers were numerous and influential in the PS), he defeated Emmanuelli in the internal ballot. Then, he was defeated by Jacques Chirac in the run-off election but, given the PS crisis, his result was judged good and he returned as First Secretary.

=== Jospin and the Plural Left (1995–2002) ===
In the legislature, the PS reconstructed a coalition with other left-wing parties: the French Communist Party, the Greens, the Radical Party of the Left, and the MDC. This "Plural Left" won the 1997 legislative election and Jospin became prime minister of the third "cohabitation".

His policy was broadly progressive. The Aubry laws reduced the working time to 35 hours a week, while Universal medical insurance was instituted. However, the policy of privatisation was pursued.

His coalition dissolved when the MDC leader Jean-Pierre Chevènement resigned from the Cabinet. The Green and Communist allies were weakened by their governmental participation.

The 2002 presidential election was focused on the theme of insecurity. Jospin, again the Socialists' candidate, was eliminated in the first round due to there being too many left-wing candidates who split the vote. He announced his retirement from politics, and the PS called on its supporters to vote for Chirac in order to defeat the far-right National Front leader Jean-Marie Le Pen, who had surprisingly advanced to the run-off. Two months later, the "Plural Left" lost the 2002 legislative election.

=== After the 2002 shock ===
François Hollande, who became First Secretary in 1997, was re-elected in 2003 during the Dijon Congress with the support of the main Socialist personalities, against the left wing of the party. In the 2004 regional elections, the Socialists had a major comeback. In coalition with the former "Plural Left", they gained power in 20 of the 22 metropolitan regions (all except Alsace and Corsica) and in the four overseas regions. The party benefited from increasing frustration with right-wing parties. However, the Socialist Party has experienced considerable difficulty in formulating an alternative to right-wing policy.

On 1 December 2004, 59% of Socialist Party members approved the proposed European Constitution. However, several well-known members of the Party, including Laurent Fabius, and left-wingers Henri Emmanuelli and Jean-Luc Mélenchon, asked the public for a "no" vote in the 29 May 2005 French referendum on the European Constitution, where the proposed Constitution was rejected. Fabius was ejected from the executive office of the party. The split over the European Constitution, as well as party leaders' competing ambitions to win the presidential nomination in 2007, led the party into considerable disarray.

In November 2005, during the Le Mans Congress, three main groups were present. The majority supported a moderate text and obtained 55%. Fabius's allies ("To Rally the Left") advocated more radical policies and gained 20%. Finally, another faction ("New Socialist Party") claimed it was necessary to renovate the party by proposing left-wing policies and a profound reform of French institutions. It obtained 25% of the vote. Virtually all factions agreed on a common agenda, broadly based on the moderate and pro-European majority's position with some left-wing amendments.

In anticipation of a Presidential primary and a special low membership rate, the party's membership grew from 127,000 to 217,000 between 2005 and 2006.

=== 2007 presidential election and its aftermath ===
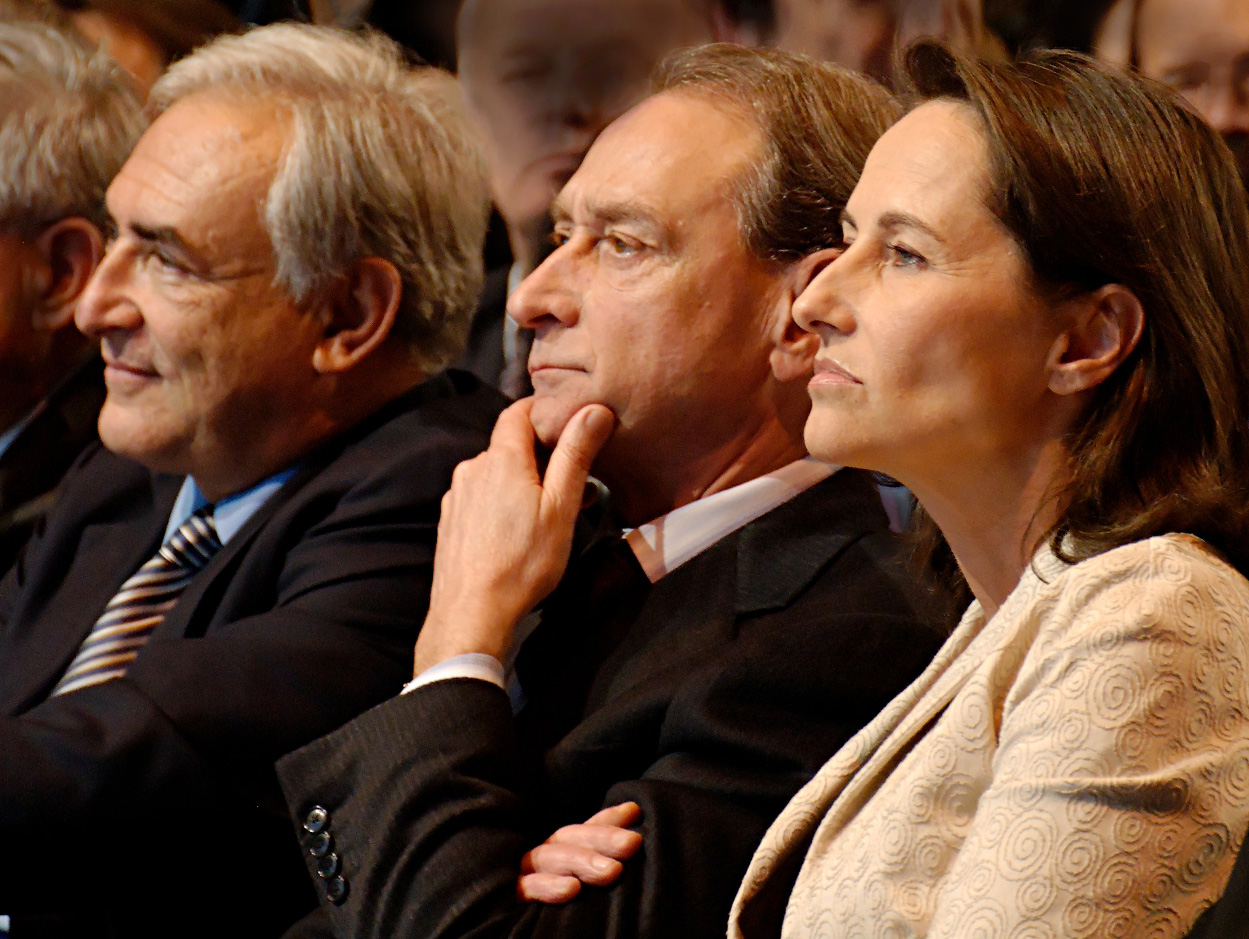
From left to right: Dominique Strauss-Kahn, Bertrand Delanoë and Ségolène Royal sitting in the front row at a meeting held on 6 February 2007 by the PS at the Carpentier Hall in Paris

Many potential candidates appeared for the 2007 presidential election: François Hollande, Laurent Fabius (from the left wing of the party), Dominique Strauss-Kahn (who claimed to represent "social democracy"), Jack Lang, Martine Aubry and Ségolène Royal, who was favoured according to the polls. Some Socialist leaders asked Jospin to return. He declared he was "available" then finally refused.

On 16 November 2006, the members of the Socialist Party chose Ségolène Royal to be their candidate with a majority of 60%. Her challengers, Strauss-Kahn and Fabius, obtained 21% and 19% respectively.

After obtaining 25.87% of the vote in the first round of France's presidential elections, Royal qualified for the second round of voting but lost with 46.94% to Nicolas Sarkozy on 6 May 2007. Immediately after her defeat several party bosses (notably Strauss-Kahn), held Ségolène Royal personally responsible for the unsuccessful campaign. At the same time, some personalities of the right wing of the party (such as Bernard Kouchner) accepted to join the government nominated by Nicolas Sarkozy.

In the 10 and 17 June 2007 National Assembly elections, the Socialist Party won 186 out of 577 seats, and about 10 affiliated, gain of 40 seats.

After the winning March 2008 municipal election, the campaign with a view to the Reims Congress started. Some candidates proposed to succeed François Hollande, who had announced he will not compete for another term as First Secretary:

- Ségolène Royal who wished to forge an alliance with the centrist party MoDem;
- the Mayor of Paris Bertrand Delanoë, supported by Lionel Jospin and his friends, who wished to keep the status quo of the 2007 campaign and come back to the Plural Left;
- Martine Aubry, supported by the followers of Laurent Fabius and Dominique Strauss-Kahn, who had the same electoral strategy as the Mayor of Paris but advocated reconciliation between the campaigners of the "yes" and the "no" to the European constitution; and
- the young left-winger Benoît Hamon.

In the pre-vote, the text of Royal arrived the first with 29%, followed by Delanoë (25%), Aubry (25%) and Hamon (19%). A part of the left wing split and founded the Left Party. During the Reims Congress, which happened in a very tense climate, the leaders of the factions failed to form a majority. Consequently, the PS members had to elect directly the next First Secretary. Disappointed by his result in the pre-vote, Delanoë renounced and called to vote for Aubry.

On 22 November 2008, it was announced that Aubry had defeated Royal by the narrow margin of 42 votes, and Royal asked for a recount. After checking, Martine Aubry was elected by a margin of 102 votes and 50.03% of votes. Denouncing frauds, Royal's team threatened to lodge a complaint before to renounce.

After that, the public image of the party was deteriorated. In the 2009 European Parliament election, the PS did not succeed to benefit from the unpopularity of President Sarkozy. It obtained only 16.5% of the vote and only just got ahead of Europe Ecology (16.3%). However, the PS strengthened its network of local elects in winning comfortably the 2010 departmental and regional elections. In September 2011, for the first time a Socialist, Jean-Pierre Bel, was elected Chairman of the Senate of France.

=== 2012 presidential election ===
Candidates for the presidency of France contested an open primary on 9 October 2011 to select the Socialist Party candidate for the 2012 presidential election. The nominations for the candidacy were opened on 28 June. Though he had not officially declared his candidacy, Dominique Strauss-Kahn, a prominent member of the Socialist Party and the managing director of the International Monetary Fund was the polls' clear favorite to defeat the incumbent conservative president, Nicolas Sarkozy. But he faced a sex assault complaint in New York and was de facto eliminated from the primary.

Eventually, former party leader François Hollande won the primary and ran as the official Socialist Party candidate for President of France. He narrowly defeated incumbent Nicolas Sarkozy, becoming president-elect of France on Sunday 6 May 2012.

The idea for holding an open primary to choose the Socialist Party presidential candidate had first been suggested in 2008, by the independent left-leaning think tank Terra Nova.

=== 2017 presidential election ===
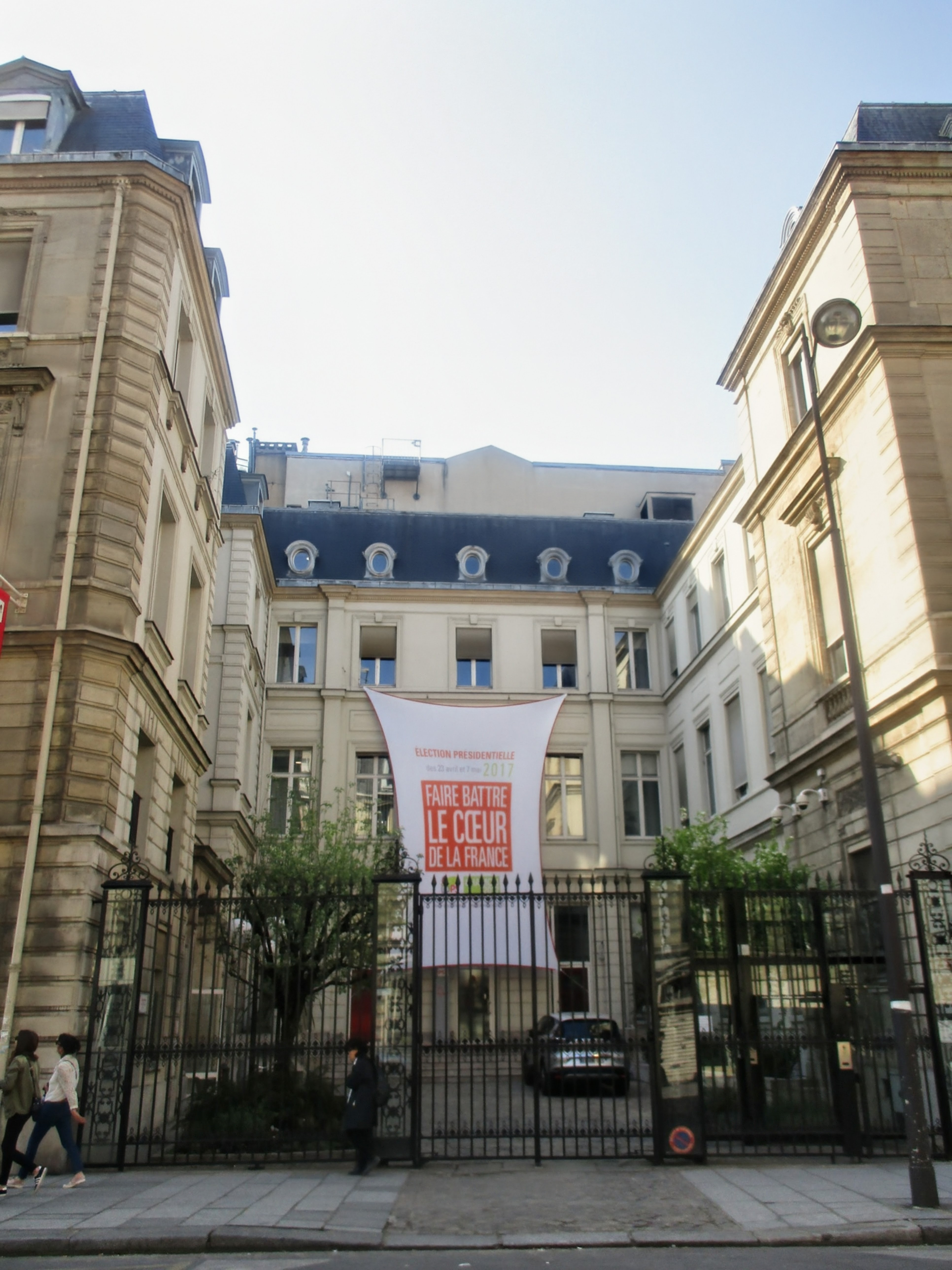
Rue de Solférino, a party seat in Paris which was sold to Apsys in December 2017 for 45.55 million euros

The Socialist Party decided to hold a presidential primary in 2017, against the backdrop of the unprecedented unpopularity of incumbent François Hollande, with a 4 percent approval rating, who announced on 1 December 2016 that he would not seek re-election, making him the first president of the Fifth Republic not to seek a second term. It was also set against the fragmentation of the left between three major candidates, with polls indicating that the party's candidate would come in fifth, behind the National Front's Marine Le Pen, François Fillon of the centre-right Republicans, Emmanuel Macron, former economy minister under Hollande who founded his centrist political movement, En Marche!, and left-wing ex-Socialist Jean-Luc Mélenchon under the banner of La France insoumise. The primary was won by Socialist rebel Benoît Hamon, who defeated ex-prime minister Manuel Valls in the second round of the primary on 29 January 2017. Hamon finished fifth in the subsequent Presidential election, with 6.36% of the vote. In the 2017 legislative election that followed the election of President Emmanuel Macron, the Socialist party dropped from 280 to 30 seats in the National Assembly, leaving it in 4th place in terms of seats, and with 7.44% of the 1st round vote. The Parliamentary left group that it dominated (with 30 out of 45 seats after the election, down from 280 out of 331 seats before) finished as the 3rd largest group in the National Assembly. Following the election, Cambadélis resigned from the post of first secretary and Rachid Temal was appointed as acting secretary. The Socialist group was ultimately refounded as the New Left (NG).

On 1 July 2017, Hamon left the Socialist Party and founded the 1st July Movement (later renamed Génération.s). The Socialist Party abstained from the confidence vote on the Second Philippe government. The party later elected 78 senators in the 2017 election.

On 7–8 April 2018, the Aubervilliers Congress elected Olivier Faure as new first secretary of the party; Faure announced the party would be in opposition to Macron and Philippe. Because of financial problems, the party was forced to sell its historical seat in Rue de Solférino and moved into a smaller one in Rue Molière, on Ivry-sur-Seine.

Following the Benalla affair, the Socialist Party entered a motion of no confidence against the government, together with the French Communist Party and La France Insoumise. The motions obtained 63 ayes and failed to reach the quorum of 289 votes required in the National Assembly.

In 2018, the New Left group changed its name into Socialists and affiliated group.

On 12 October 2018, MEP Emmanuel Maurel left the party together with other elected officials and founded the Alternative for a republican, ecologist and socialist program (APRÉS).

For the 2019 European election, the Socialist Party formed a joint list with the Radical Party of the Left, Place Publique and New Deal, with Raphaël Glucksmann at its head. The list scored 6.19% of votes and elected three MEPs.

=== 2022 presidential election ===
In the first round of voting in the 2022 French presidential election, the candidate Anne Hidalgo obtained the worst presidential election result in the party's history, with 1.75% of the total vote.

=== 2022 legislative elections ===
In advance of the 2022 French legislative election, the party entered into a left-wing alliance, the New Ecologic and Social People's Union (NUPES), joining Europe Ecology – The Greens, the French Communist Party, La France Insoumise and other minor left-wing parties. Some Socialists like Sylvie Tolmont, disillusioned with the alliance, stood in the election as dissident candidates. The Socialist Party was able to win 27 seats, becoming the second left-wing force in the National Assembly, after La France Insoumise.

=== 2024 legislative elections ===
In advance of the 2024 French legislative election, the party entered into a left-wing alliance, the New Popular Front. In the 2024 parliamentary election, the Socialist Party more than doubled its seats in the National Assembly as part of the left-wing NFP alliance. In December 2024, NFP, together with far-right National Rally ousted Prime Minister Michel Barnier in a motion of censure.

In January 2025, PS decided not to support motion of censure against Francois Bayrou, initiated by La France Insoumise, in exchange for concessions in new budget. Votes of PS deputies weren't needed to escape the motion of censure. Concessions included: Renegotiation of 2023 pension reform, abandonment of the 4000 job cuts in education, 500 job cuts in France Travail and overseas budget cuts, one billion euro increase in healthcare spending and the "maintenance" of the new "differential contribution on high incomes". LFI leader Jean-Luc Mélenchon reacted by commenting: "The NFP is reduced by one party".

== Ideology and factions ==
While initially the party presented itself as anti-capitalist, it abandoned this position in 1991, and the main ideology of the PS is now social democracy. It has also been described as social-liberal as well.

=== Factions ===
Factions are organised in the Socialist Party through policy declarations called motions on which the party members vote at each party congress:

- Royalists (moderate social democracy): Ségolène Royal, Gérard Collomb, Jean-Noël Guérini, Gaëtan Gorce, Jean-Louis Bianco, Julien Dray, Vincent Peillon, Aurélie Filippetti, Hélène Mandroux, Jean-Jack Queyranne, François Rebsamen and Manuel Valls
- Aubryists (Christian left, social democracy): Martine Aubry, François Lamy, Sandrine Mazetier, Pierre Mauroy, Paulette Guinchard-Kunstler, Adeline Hazan and Arnaud Montebourg (Renovate Now)
- Fabiusians (progressivism): Laurent Fabius, Claude Bartolone, Marylise Lebranchu, Alain Le Vern, Alain Vidalies and Marie-Noëlle Lienemann
- Delanoistes (social liberalism): Bertrand Delanoë, François Hollande, Jean-Marc Ayrault, Lionel Jospin, Michel Rocard, Jean-Yves Le Drian, Élisabeth Guigou, Michel Sapin, Alain Rousset, Harlem Désir, Pierre Cohen, Michel Destot and Roland Ries
- New Socialist Party (democratic socialism): Henri Emmanuelli, Benoît Hamon, Jacques Fleury, Michel Vergnier, André Lejeune and Paul Quilès
- Eco-socialists (eco-socialism and social-ecology): Christophe Caresche, Jean-Louis Tourenne, Nicole Bricq, Geneviève Gaillard and Philippe Tourtelier

== Organization ==
=== First secretaries ===
- Alain Savary (1969–1971)
- François Mitterrand (1971–1981)
- Lionel Jospin (1981–1988)
- Pierre Mauroy (1988–1992)
- Laurent Fabius (1992–1993)
- Michel Rocard (1993–1994)
- Henri Emmanuelli (1994–1995)
- Lionel Jospin (1995–1997)
- François Hollande (1997–2008)
- Martine Aubry (2008–2012)
- Harlem Désir (appointed on 30 June 2011, acting during Martine Aubry's candidacy in the 2011 French Socialist Party presidential primary; 2012–2014)
- Jean-Christophe Cambadélis (2014–2017)
- Rachid Temal (2017–2018; acting)
- Olivier Faure (2018–present)

=== Federations ===
- Socialist Federation of Martinique

== Election results ==
=== Presidency ===
Presidency of the French Republic
Election year	Candidate	First round			Second round			Result
Election year	Candidate	Votes	%	Rank	Votes	%	Rank	Result
1974	François Mitterrand	11,044,373	43.25	▲1st	12,971,604	49.19	▲2nd	Lost
1981	François Mitterrand	7,505,960	25.85	▼2nd	15,708,262	51.76	▲1st	Won
1988	François Mitterrand	10,367,220	34.10	▲1st	16,704,279	54.02	1st	Won
1995	Lionel Jospin	7,097,786	23.30	1st	14,180,644	47.36	▼2nd	Lost
2002	Lionel Jospin	4,610,113	16.18	▼3rd	—N/a			Lost
2007	Ségolène Royal	9,500,112	25.87	▲2nd	16,790,440	46.94	2nd	Lost
2012	François Hollande	10,272,705	28.63	▲1st	18,000,668	51.64	▲1st	Won
2017	Benoît Hamon	2,291,288	6.36	▼5th	—N/a			Lost
2022	Anne Hidalgo	616,478	1.75	▼10th	—N/a			Lost

=== National Assembly ===
National Assembly
Year	1st round				2nd round				Seats	+/–	Result	Note
Year	Votes	%	± pp	Rank	Votes	%	± pp	Rank	Seats	+/–	Result	Note
1973	4,559,241	19.18%	▲2.65	3rd	5,564,610	23.72%	▲2.47	▲2nd	89 / 491	▲32	Opposition	In coalition with the MRG
1978	6,451,151	22.58%	▲3.40	▲2nd	7,212,916	28.31%	▲4.59	▲1st	104 / 491	▲15	Opposition	
1981	9,432,362	37.52%	▲14.94	▲1st	9,198,332	49.25%	▲20.94	1st	269 / 491	▲165	Coalition (1981)	In coalition with the MRG
1981	9,432,362	37.52%	▲14.94	▲1st	9,198,332	49.25%	▲20.94	1st	269 / 491	▲165	Coalition (1981–1983)	In coalition with the MRG
1981	9,432,362	37.52%	▲14.94	▲1st	9,198,332	49.25%	▲20.94	1st	269 / 491	▲165	Coalition (1983–1984)	In coalition with the MRG
1981	9,432,362	37.52%	▲14.94	▲1st	9,198,332	49.25%	▲20.94	1st	269 / 491	▲165	Coalition (1984–1986)	In coalition with the MRG
1986	8,693,939	31.02%	▼6.50	1st	—N/a				206 / 573	▼63	Opposition	
1988	8,493,702	34.77%	▲3.75	1st	9,198,778	45.31%	▼3.94	1st	260 / 577	▲54	Coalition (1988)	
1988	8,493,702	34.77%	▲3.75	1st	9,198,778	45.31%	▼3.94	1st	260 / 577	▲54	Coalition (1988–1991)	
1993	4,415,495	17.61%	▼17.16	▼3rd	6,143,179	31.01%	▼14.30	1st	59 / 577	▼201	Opposition	
1997	5,977,045	23.49%	▲5.88	▲1st	9,722,022	38.20%	▲7.19	1st	255 / 577	▲196	Coalition (1997–2002)	
2002	6,086,599	24.11%	▲0.62	▼2nd	7,482,169	35.26%	▼2.94	▼2nd	140 / 577	▼115	Opposition	
2007	6,436,520	24.73%	▲0.62	2nd	8,624,861	42.27%	▲7.01	2nd	186 / 577	▲46	Opposition	
2012	7,618,326	29.35%	▲4.62	▲1st	9,420,889	40.91%	▼1.36	▲1st	280 / 577	▲94	Coalition (2012–2014)	
2012	7,618,326	29.35%	▲4.62	▲1st	9,420,889	40.91%	▼1.36	▲1st	280 / 577	▲94	Coalition (2014)	
2012	7,618,326	29.35%	▲4.62	▲1st	9,420,889	40.91%	▼1.36	▲1st	280 / 577	▲94	Coalition (2014–2016)	
2012	7,618,326	29.35%	▲4.62	▲1st	9,420,889	40.91%	▼1.36	▲1st	280 / 577	▲94	Coalition (2016–2017)	
2017	1,685,677	7.44%	▼21.91	▼5th	1,032,842	5.68%	▼35.23	▼4th	30 / 577	▼249	Opposition	
2022	860,201	3.78%	▼3.66	▼7th	1,084,909	5.23%	▼0.45	▼6th	28 / 577	▼2	Opposition	In coalition with the NUPES
2024	2,774,088	8.65%	▲4.87	▲4th	2,634,176	9.66%	▲4.43	▲3rd	65 / 577	▲37	Opposition (2024–2025)	In coalition with the New Popular Front
2024	2,774,088	8.65%	▲4.87	▲4th	2,634,176	9.66%	▲4.43	▲3rd	65 / 577	▲37	Confidence and supply (2025–2026)	In coalition with the New Popular Front
2024	2,774,088	8.65%	▲4.87	▲4th	2,634,176	9.66%	▲4.43	▲3rd	65 / 577	▲37	Opposition (2026–present)	In coalition with the New Popular Front

=== European Parliament ===
Election	Leader	Votes	%	Seats	+/–	EP Group
1979 (Note: Run in a joint list with MRG, that won 22 seats in total.)	François Mitterrand	4,763,026	23.53 (#2)	20 / 81	New	SOC
1984	Lionel Jospin	4,188,875	20.76 (#2)	20 / 81	0	SOC
1989 (Note: Run in a joint list with MRG, that won 22 seats in total.)	Laurent Fabius	4,286,354	23.61 (#2)	17 / 87	▼3	SOC
1994	Michel Rocard	2,824,173	14.49 (#2)	15 / 87	▼2	PES
1999 (Note: Run in a joint list with PRG and MDC, that won 22 seats in total.)	François Hollande	3,873,901	21.95 (#1)	18 / 78	▲3	PES
2004	François Hollande	4,960,756	28.90 (#1)	31 / 74	▲13	PES
2009	Martine Aubry	2,838,160	16.48 (#2)	14 / 74	▼17	S&D
2014 (Note: Run in a joint list with PRG, that won 13 seats in total.)	Jean-Christophe Cambadélis	2,649,202	13.98 (#3)	12 / 74	▼2	S&D
2019 (Note: Run in a joint list with PP, PRG and ND, that won 6 seats in total.)	Raphaël Glucksmann	1,403,170	6.19 (#6)	3 / 79	▼9	S&D
2024 (Note: Run in a joint list with PP, that won 13 seats in total.)	Raphaël Glucksmann	3,401,076	13.80 (#3)	10 / 81	▲7	S&D

== Splinter parties ==
- 1956–: Guianese Socialist Party, splinter from the French Section of the Workers' International (SFIO), the predecessor of the Socialist Party
- 1970–1973: Party of Socialist Democracy (PDS), led by the deputy Émile Muller
- 1972–: Guadeloupean Socialist Party (PSG), founded by the former senator René Toribio
- 1973: Socialist Democratic Movement of France (MDSF), led by the deputy Max Lejeune
- 1973–1995: fusion of PDS, MDSF and other splinter groups (Liberal Socialist Movement, Democratic Socialism, Socialism for Liberties and Democracy) to form the Socialist Democratic Movement of France (MDS), renamed after the March 1973 legislative election Social Democratic Party (PSD), joined the centre-right Union for French Democracy (UDF) in 1978
- 1986–: Alsatian Democracy Movement (MDA), founded by Alfred Muller, elected in 1993 as deputy with the endorsement of the PS
- 1990–: Martinican Socialist Party (PMS), founded by Maurice Louis-Joseph-Dogué.
- 1993–2002: Movement of Citizens (MDC), founded by the deputy Jean-Pierre Chevènement, renamed the Citizen and Republican Movement (MRC) in 2003
- 1994–: United Guadeloupe, Socialism and Realities, formerly (1991-1994) the Reflexion and Action Group for Guadeloupe (GRAP-G) faction inside the Guadeloupe federation of the Socialist Party
- 1996–: Social Democratic Corsica (CSD) (fr), founded by Simon Renucci
- 2007–: Modern Left (LGM), founded by the senator Jean-Marie Bockel, joined the centre-right Union of Democrats and Independents (UDI) in 2012
- 2008–: Left Party (PG), founded by senator Jean-Luc Mélenchon, joined the Left Front in 2009
- 2013–: New Deal (ND)
- 2015–: Les Socialistes insoumis, led by former MEP Liêm Hoang-Ngoc
- 2017–: Génération.s, le mouvement, led by former presidential candidate Benoît Hamon
- 2018–: Republican and Socialist Left, led by Emmanuel Maurel and Marie-Noëlle Lienemann
- 2022 (19 May): Fédération progressiste, pro-Macron splinter led by François Rebsamen, including e.g. future ministers Olivier Klein and Patrice Vergriete
- 2023 (1 February): La Convention, splinter against any electoral agreement with LFI led by former Prime Minister Bernard Cazeneuve and amalgamating other splinter parties (e.g. Fédération progressiste) and minor center left parties

== See also ==
- French Section of the Workers' International
- New Left group
- Socialist and Republican group
- Terra Nova (think tank)
- Workers and Peasants Socialist Party
- Pasokification
