= Convention of Republican Institutions =

Convention of Republican Institutions Convention des institutions républicaines
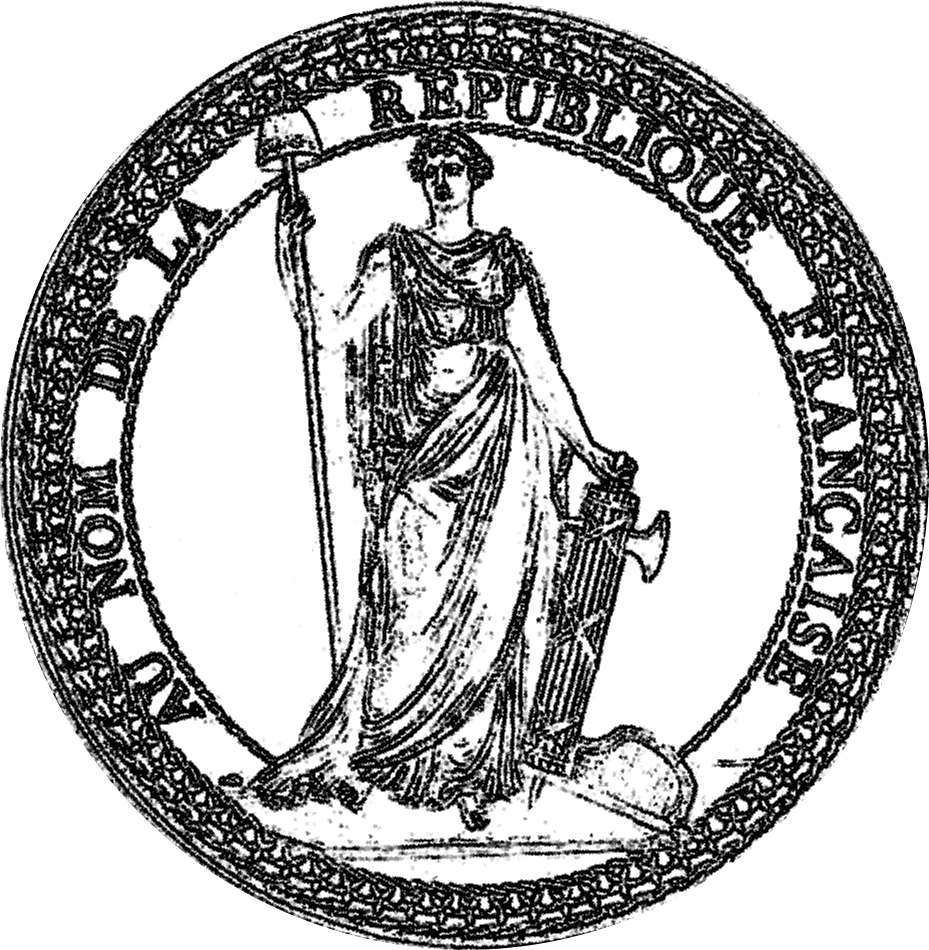
- Abbreviation: CIR
- Leader: François Mitterrand
- Founded: 11 June 1964
- Dissolved: 13 June 1971
- Preceded by: Democratic and Socialist Union of the Resistance
- Merged into: Socialist Party
- Ideology: Democratic socialism Social democracy Liberal socialism Republicanism; Anti-Gaullism
- Political position: Center-left to left-wing
- National affiliation: FGDS

The Convention of Republican Institutions (French: Convention des institutions républicaines, CIR) was a socialist, republican and anti-Gaullist party in France led by François Mitterrand. The CIR, founded in early June 1964, transformed from a loosely organized club to a formal political party by April 1965, a few months before the time of Mitterrand's candidacy in the 1965 election. Roughly at the same time, the CIR played an important role in the foundation of the Federation of the Democratic and Socialist Left (FGDS), which ended with the FGDS' landslide defeat to the Gaullists in the 1968 election. The CIR merged into the Socialist Party at the Epinay Congress in 1971.
