= Lilletorget =

Square in Oslo, Norway

Coordinates: 59°54′49″N 10°45′23″E

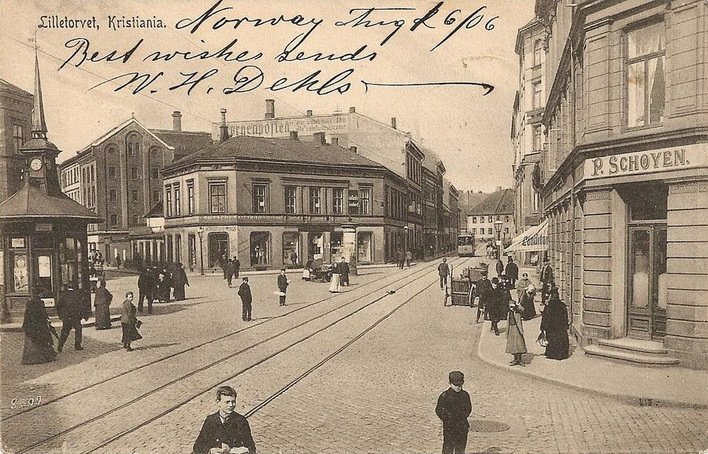
Old postcard from Lilletorget

Lilletorget (originally named Vaterlands Torv) is a square in Oslo, Norway. It was established as a square in 1867, and was named Lilletorvet from 1872. It is located near the Vaterland Bridge of Brugata.

Ola Enstad's sculpture Neve og rose (English: Fist and Rose) from 1991 is located at Lilletorget.

There was also a temporary station with the same name, which was established to replace Brugata and Hausmanns gate, which were being upgraded and reconstructed. This was removed in 2021.
