= Ola Enstad =

Norwegian sculptor

Ola Enstad (10 November 1942 – 2 August 2013) was a Norwegian sculptor.

== Biography ==
He was born in Lesjaskog in Oppland, Norway. Enstad first studied architecture at the Norwegian Institute of Technology in Trondheim. Enstad attended the Norwegian National Academy of Craft and Art Industry Statens håndverks- og kunstindustriskole) from 1967 to 1969 and the Norwegian National Academy of Fine Arts (Statens kunstakademi) under Per Palle Storm in 1969–1972. He debuted at the Autumn Exhibition (Høstutstillingen) in Oslo during 1970 and held a separate exhibition in the Artists' Association in 1973. He was awarded the Statens reisestipend in 1976 and Oslo bys stipend in 1977.

Among his works are Stegosaurus from 1979 (later destroyed), 4 vogger from 1989, located at the Norwegian Museum of Contemporary Art, and Neve og rose from 1991 at Lilletorget, Oslo. Ola Enstad received the Ingeborg og Per Palle Storms ærespris in 1999.
