= Guillermo Galeote =

Spanish physician and politician (1941–2021)

Guillermo Galeote Jiménez

Member of the Congress of Deputies
- In office 1977–1993

Personal details
- Born: May 6, 1941 San Sebastián, Spain
- Died: January 28, 2021 (aged 79) Madrid, Spain
- Party: Spanish Socialist Workers' Party (PSOE)
- Occupation: Physician; politician

Guillermo Galeote Jiménez (6 May 1941 – 28 January 2021) was a Spanish doctor and politician who served as a member of the Congress of Deputies from 1977 to 1993 and as Secretary of Finance for the PSOE.

A specialist in Internal medicine, he was elected president of the Young Physicians Section of the General Council of Official Medical Colleges of Spain, served as a research fellow at the CSIC, and was a member of the board of the Medical College of Córdoba and the General Council of Medical Colleges of Spain. He was national president of Young Physicians. In 1960 he joined the PSOE.

He was born in San Sebastián, and died of COVID-19 at age 79 in Madrid, during the COVID-19 pandemic in Spain.
