= Jean Poperen =

French politician

Jean Poperen (9 January 1925, Angers – 23 August 1997) was a French politician.

Poperen joined the Communist Party (PCF) at 18, and was also a member of the Union of Communist Students. He left the PCF after the Hungarian Revolution of 1956 and became a founding member of the Unified Socialist Party (PSU) in 1960. Disagreeing with the PSU's party line, he founded the Union of Socialist Groups and Clubs (UGCS). The UGCS participated in the Federation of the Democratic and Socialist Left and joined the new Socialist Party at the party's second national congress.

Poperen, a member of the party's left-wing, was the party's second-in-command from 1981 to 1987. Poperen also served in the Michel Rocard government, and was PS deputy for the Rhône from 1973 to 1988.
