= Alain Savary =

French politician (1918–1988)

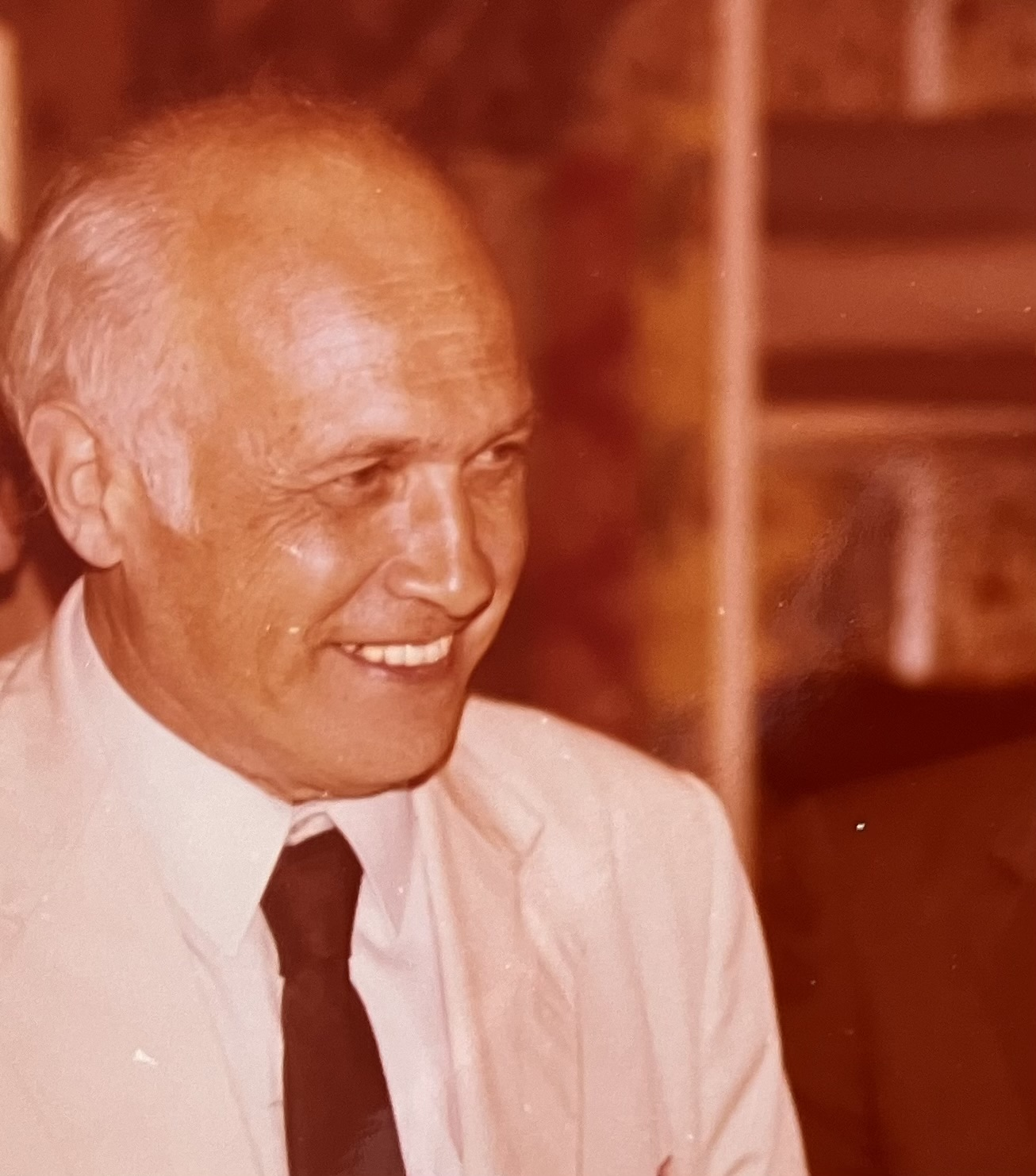

Minister of National Education
- In office 22 May 1981 – 17 July 1984
- Prime Minister: Pierre Mauroy
- Preceded by: Christian Beullac
- Succeeded by: Jean-Pierre Chevènement

First Secretary of the French Socialist Party
- In office 17 July 1969 – 16 June 1971
- Preceded by: Guy Mollet
- Succeeded by: François Mitterrand

Personal details
- Born: 25 April 1918 Algiers, French Algeria
- Died: 17 February 1988 (aged 69) Paris, France
- Party: Socialist Party
- Education: Lycée Buffon
- Alma mater: École Libre des Sciences Politiques

Alain Savary (French: [alɛ̃ savaʁi]; 25 April 1918 – 17 February 1988) was a French Socialist politician, deputy to the National Assembly of France during the Fourth and Fifth Republic, chairman of the Socialist Party (PS) and a government minister in the 1950s and in 1981–1984, when he was appointed by President François Mitterrand as Minister of National Education.

== Life ==
In 1940, as soon as France was occupied by the German army, Savary enlisted in the Resistance. He organized the rallying of Saint-Pierre et Miquelon to the Free French Forces and became its governor. After the war, he participated in the restoring of the Republican State.

A member of the French Section of the Workers' International (Socialist Party, SFIO) he was deputy for Saint-Pierre et Miquelon throughout most of the Fourth Republic, from 1944 to 1946 and from 1951 to 1958. In 1956, he was nominated Secretary of State for Foreign Affairs in Guy Mollet's cabinet, but resigned due to his opposition to the repressive policy of Mollet in Algerian War (1954–62) and to the arrest of Ahmed Ben Bella. He left the SFIO in 1958, because of the party's support for Charles de Gaulle's comeback and for the new Constitution elaborating a presidential regime (the Fifth Republic).

With Pierre Mendès France, he founded the dissident Autonomous Socialist Party (PSA) which became, in 1960, the Unified Socialist Party (PSU). However, he left it in 1967 and founded the Union of Clubs for the Renewal of the Left, which joined the Federation of the Democratic and Socialist Left (FGDS) which had supported left-wing candidate François Mitterrand at the 1965 presidential election. Then, he returned to the "old socialist house" when it was replaced by the Socialist Party (PS).

=== In the PS ===
Reconciled with Guy Mollet, Savary succeeded him to the leadership of the party in 1969. As First Secretary of the PS, he promised to begin an "ideological dialogue" with the French Communist Party (PCF), which was the largest left-wing party in France at the time. He was faced with growing pressure from internal opponents insisted that he remain dependent on Mollet's followers and not to pursue the "renewal" of the party. Two years later, during the Épinay Congress, he was removed by François Mitterrand, who proposed an alliance with the Communists based on a Common Program.

Savary became a Deputy for Haute-Garonne in 1973. In 1981 he became Minister of National Education under President François Mitterrand.

In June 1984, Mitterrand decided to withdraw the "Savary Bill" to limit the financing of private schools due to large demonstrations by the supporters of private schools. Savary resigned in July 1984. At the same time the government of Prime Minister Pierre Mauroy was replaced by a new government led by Laurent Fabius. He retired from government at this point and held no further offices prior to his death at age 69.

Political offices
Preceded by Christian Beullac	Minister of National Education; 1981–1983	Succeeded by Jean-Pierre Chevènement
