= Anti-Gaullism =

Opposition to Gaullism

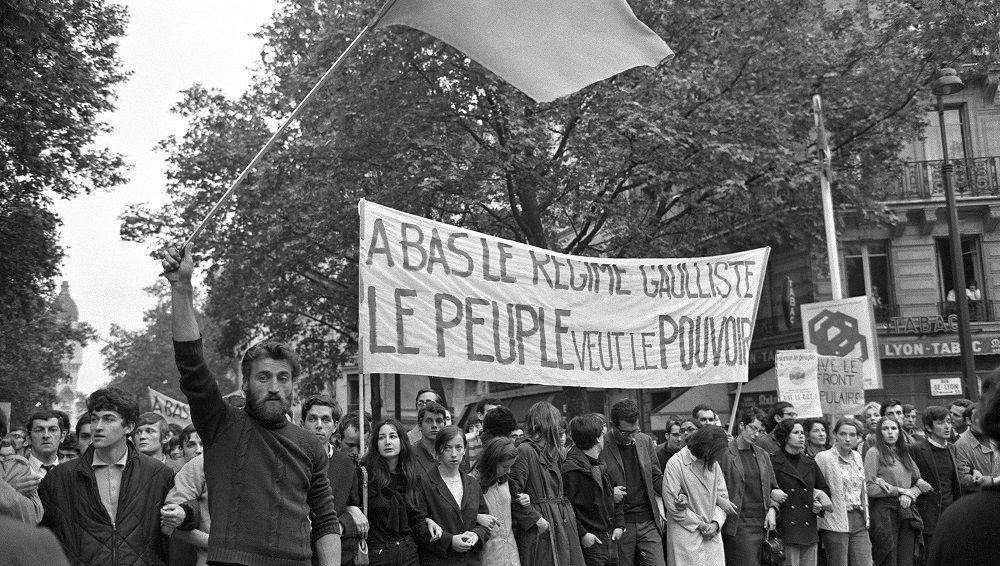
Anti-Gaullist demonstration during May 68

Anti-Gaullism refers to organized opposition to Gaullism. It encompasses individuals, groups, and movements that oppose the political and philosophical principles of Charles de Gaulle.

== Diversity ==
Even more than Gaullism, anti-Gaullism is not a rigid doctrinal framework but a mood that is capable of spanning the French political spectrum from right to left. De Gaulle's biographer Julian Jackson traces four often interlinked traditions of anti-Gaullism:

- Domestic resistance fighters who resented his leadership and the myth that the whole of France resisted
- Republicans who saw his desire for personal rule as a threat to democratic, particularly parliamentary, norms and traditions
- Realists on the center right and center left who objected to his scepticism about Atlanticism, European integration or both
- The extreme right who believed he was wrong to blame Petain or who later objected to decolonisation, particularly in French Algeria

== De Gaulle-Giraud Dispute ==
In the year of 1942, there was a great debate between De Gaulle and Henri Giraud, called the "De Gaulle–Giraud Dispute." Both of these men were fierce anti-Nazis, but both were vying for the control and power of the government of Free France – which would likely mean the control over the French government that would come after the war.

== Right-Wing Anti-Gaullists ==
=== Vichy Regime (1940–1944) ===
For supporters of the Vichy Regime, Pétain's assumption of power was legitimate and so de Gaulle's self exile and opposition to the regime was seen as military rebellion. Consequently, de Gaulle was sentenced to death by the government for "treason, intelligence with the enemy, and desertion to a foreign country".

Charles Maurras denounced him as a traitor who had sold out to the British, whom he regarded as "enemy number one".

=== Fifth Republic ===
==== Algerian War (1954–1962) ====
Charles de Gaulle's eventual support for Algerian independence alienated much of the right, Far-right former supporters, such as Pierre Lagaillarde and Guy Forzy, founded the clandestine terrorist organization Organisation armée secrète (OAS) following the Week of the Barricades, advocating a continued French presence in Algeria. Even moderate right-wing politicians like Roger Duchet, a senator from 1946 to 1959, opposed the self-determination policy. When the Évian Accords referendum was held, several members of the major conservative party, the National Centre of Independents and Peasants (CNIP), opposed the agreement.

==== Presidential Inauguration (1959) ====
The establishment of the Fifth Republic divided the political right. Despite support from figures like Henri Dorgères, others such as Jacques Isorni, strongly opposed de Gaulle's inauguration, declaring, "The defender of Louis XVI cannot vote for Robespierre".

In 1962, unable to overthrow de Gaulle, right-wing anti-Gaullists censured the Pompidou government with former de Gaulle ally Paul Reynaud being the first to sign the motion, which was endorsed by 109 CNIP deputies out of 121.

==== Policies of De Gaulle (Post-1946) ====
As early as 1946, some of de Gaulle's right-wing adversaries emerged within the Popular Republican Movement (MRP), which had been loyal to Gaullism during the French Resistance. Ideological divergences, especially regarding France’s integration into Europe, became apparent.

During de Gaulle’s presidency, his economic and monetary policies were criticized. His proposal to involve workers in company profits alarmed business circles. Gaston Monnerville, president of the Senate, accused him of "treason".

== Left-Wing Anti-Gaullists ==
Unlike the right, the French left was less divided in its opposition to de Gaulle's policies, given his identity as a right-wing leader. Most left-wing politicians opposed Gaullist measures during the Fifth Republic.

=== The French Communist Party ===
During World War II, some French Communists joined de Gaulle in the French Resistance, such as Jean Moulin. However, the communists later opposed de Gaulle over the powers of the Constituent Assembly, the institutions, and the regime's nature. Upon the creation of the Rally for the French People (RPF), the French Communist Party (PCF) accused de Gaulle of being neither democratic nor republican but instead a defender of capitalism and big business. Until 1958, de Gaulle was labeled a "fascist" or a "wannabe dictator serving big capital".

=== The Socialists ===
As early as 1947, socialists, including Vincent Auriol, then President of France, considered the Rally for the French People (RPF) a movement partly composed of Vichy sympathizers and fascists. Although some socialists, like Guy Mollet, supported de Gaulle during the establishment of the Fifth Republic, his governance soon diverged from their parliamentary vision. They criticized him for exercising personal power and ignoring national realities, particularly opposing his proposal for the president to be elected by direct universal suffrage.

Key figures of moderate left-wing anti-Gaullism included Pierre Mendès France and François Mitterrand, the latter running against de Gaulle in the second round of the 1965 French presidential election.

== Sources ==
- Andrieu, Claire; Braud, Phillippe; Fiketty, Guillaume (2007). Dictionnaire De Gaulle. Paris: Robert Laffont. pp. 39–41. ISBN 9782221102800.
- Louis, Tiphanie; Masson-Viardot, Evelyne (August 30, 2018). "Allocution de De Gaulle sur l'autodétermination". Enseigner de Gaulle.
- Béthouart, Bruno (2015). Gilles Richard, Jacqueline Sainclivier (ed.). La recomposition des droites en France à la Libération, 1944-1948. Rennes: Presses Universitaires de Rennes. pp. 25–36. ISBN 9782753500167.
- Boyer, Patrice (2004). "Les droites vues par le Parti communiste français: le discours sur le MRP, le PRL et le RPF, 1946-1947". In Gilles Richard, Jacqueline Sainclivier (ed.). La Recomposition des droites en France à la Libération 1944-1948. Rennes: Presses Universitaires de Rennes. pp. 73–83. ISBN 9782753525238.
