= Aubervilliers Congress =

Political party

2018 Socialist Party leadership election
← 2015	29 March 2018
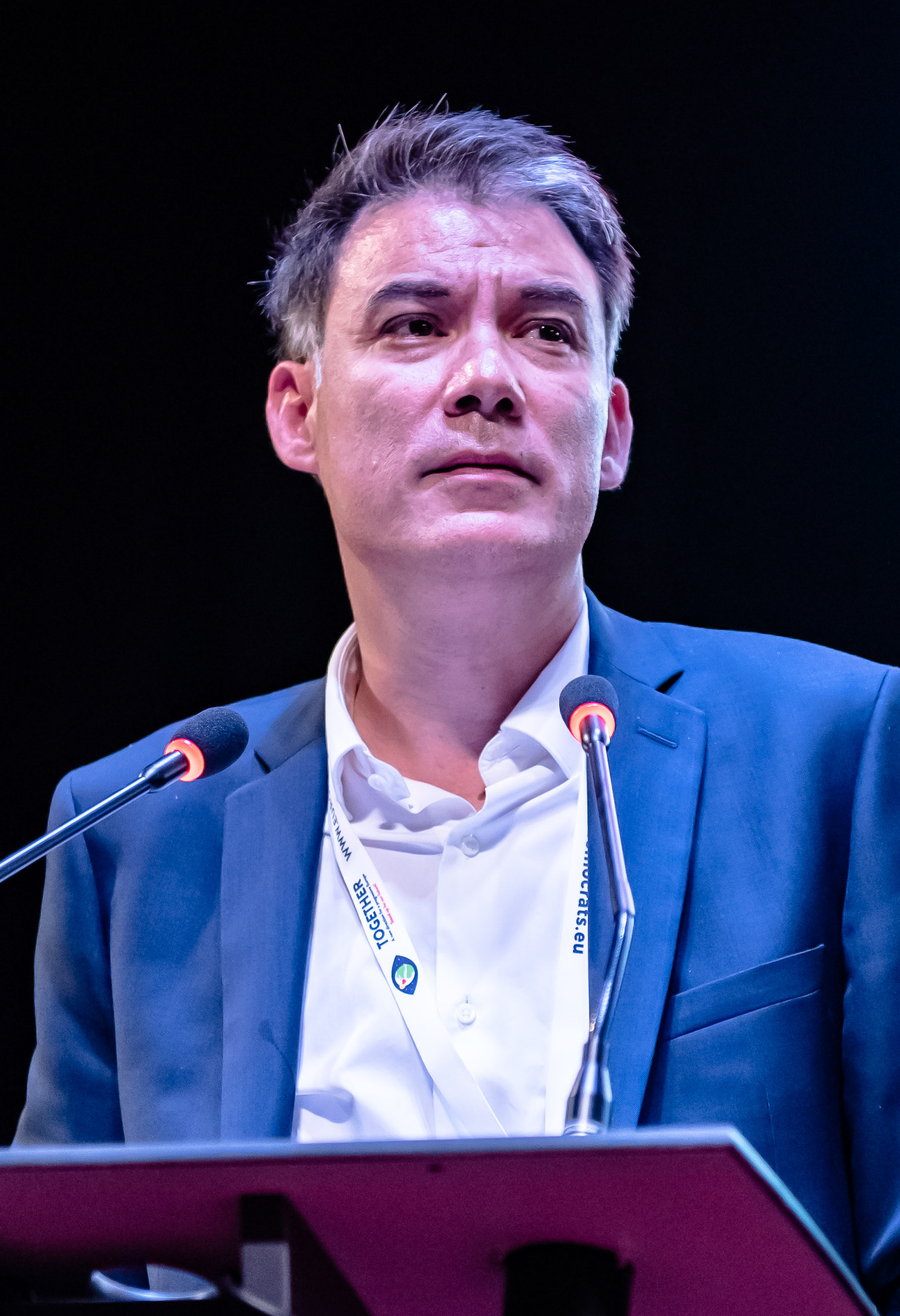
Nominee	Olivier Faure
Party	PS
First Secretary before election
Rachid Temal (interim)
Elected First Secretary
Olivier Faure

The Aubervilliers Congress (French: congrès d'Aubervilliers) of the Socialist Party (PS) was held on 7 and 8 April 2018 near the Front Populaire station of the Paris Métro in Aubervilliers, Seine-Saint-Denis. The congress determined the political line of the party and elected Olivier Faure as the next First Secretary after the resignation of Jean-Christophe Cambadélis on 18 June 2017.

Luc Carvounas, Olivier Faure, Stéphane Le Foll, and Emmanuel Maurel stood as candidates for the leadership of the party. After the orientation text submitted by Faure secured a near-majority of support from activists in the first round, Le Foll, who came in second, announced his withdrawal, effectively ensuring that Faure would be elected as the new leader of the party.

== Background ==
On 9 December 2017, the National Council of the Socialist Party (PS) agreed to hold the next party congress near the Front Populaire station of the Paris Métro in Aubervilliers, Seine-Saint-Denis on 7 and 8 April 2018. The choice of the location is considered a symbolically important "wink", referencing the left-wing Popular Front coalition that came to power in 1936.

The party congress comes a year after the end of the quinquennat of President François Hollande, who decided not to run for re-election amid tepid approval ratings. In the subsequent primary, Benoît Hamon was nominated as the presidential candidate of the party, but secured only 6.36% of the vote in the first round of the presidential election, the worst score for a socialist candidate since 1969. The party suffered further losses in the legislative elections, winning just 30 seats, compared with 278 in 2012, and First Secretary Jean-Christophe Cambadélis subsequently announced his resignation as leader of the party. The successive defeats left the party with a considerable financial burden: in addition to the €15.072 million in expenses from Hamon's presidential campaign, public financing, based on the number of votes in the legislative elections, fell from €24.9 million to €7.6 million, and the PS subsequently announced the sale of its historic headquarters on the rue de Solférino for €45.5 million on 19 December.

The PS was led by "collegial direction" beginning in July until Rachid Temal was appointed as "legal representative" and coordinator of the party on 30 September. The congress was held in the context of the lack of a clear political identity for the Socialist Party, with La France Insoumise to the left, La République En Marche! to the right, and Hamon departing the party to found the movement Génération.s. According to an Ifop-Fiducial poll conducted in early February 2018, only 8% of respondents (and 35% of PS supporters) considered the PS to best represent the opposition to Emmanuel Macron, compared to 37% for La France Insoumise, 26% for The Republicans, and 20% for the National Front.

== Organization ==
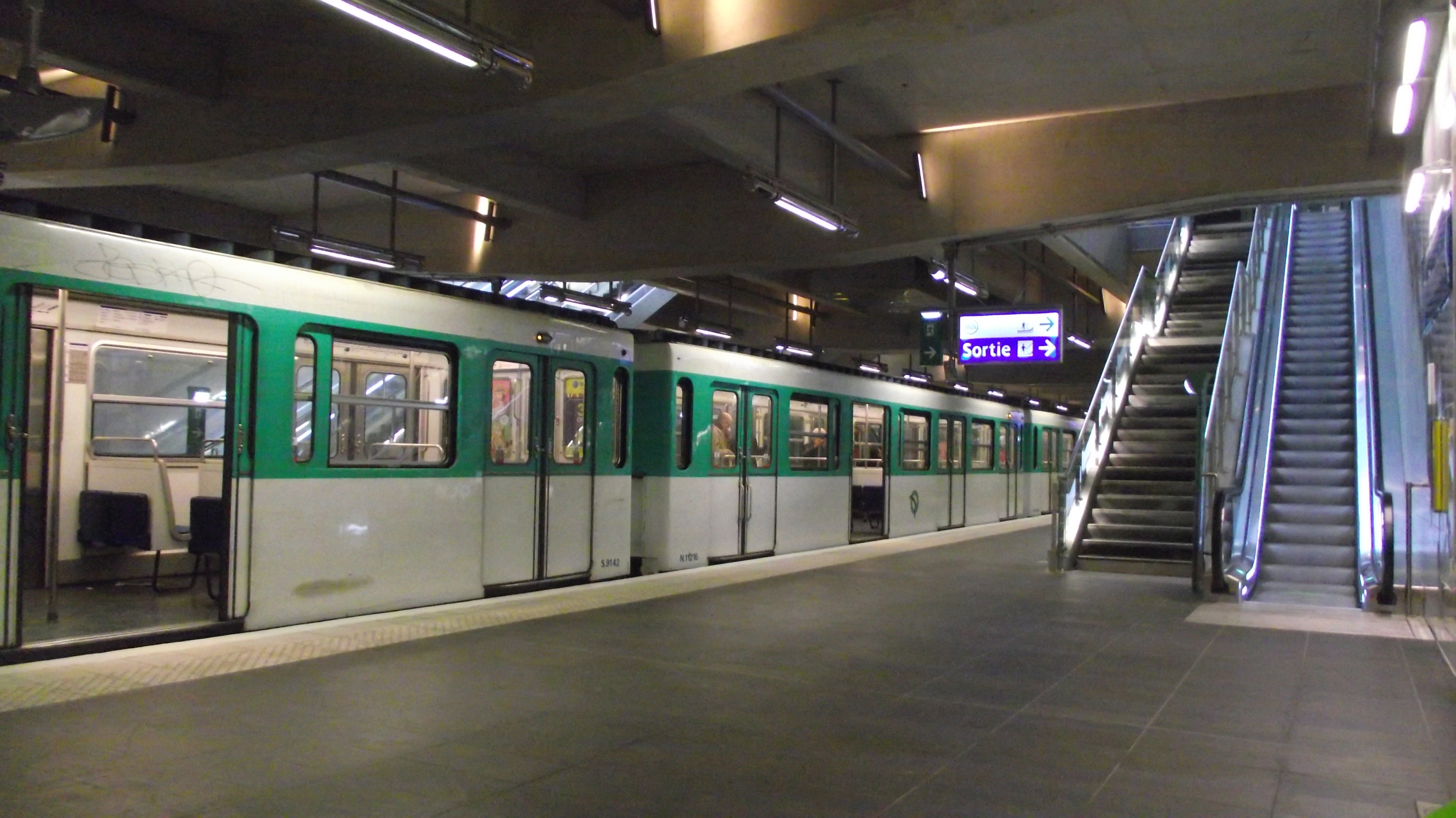
Front Populaire station of the Paris Métro

The procedures of the congress were changed slightly from previous years', with the removal of "general contributions" before motions, with the latter reduced to 50,000 characters. In addition, the requirements to submit a motion was raised, requiring the signatures of 5% of members of the National Council (i.e., 16 members). These changes were put to a vote among party members on 18 January, and the modifications were approved, with partial results on 19 January indicating 67.37% in support of the changes and a turnout level of 23.34%. Prospective candidates for First Secretary were required to submit an "orientation text" with a list of signatories presenting their political project to the National Council by 27 January, with the same requirements as motions. In a statement published on 23 February, the party announced that a televised debate between the four candidates would be held on 7 March from 21:00 to 22:00 CET in cooperation with LCI, RTL, and Le Figaro.

On 15 March, party members voted on the orientation texts, with supporters of each motion represented at the congress in proportion to their support within each of the departmental federations, therefore influencing the future composition of the party leadership. Members voted again on 29 March, deciding between the top two motions in the previous vote, determining the First Secretary of the party, and electing the new leaders of departmental federations. All party members up-to-date on contributions before 31 December 2017 were eligible to participate, in addition to former members from 2015 onward who pay the membership fee for 2018. The Aubervilliers Congress took place on 7 and 8 April, designating the national leadership of the party.

== Candidates ==
=== Validated ===
- Luc Carvounas, deputy for Val-de-Marne's 9th constituency
- Olivier Faure, president of the New Left group in the National Assembly and deputy for Seine-et-Marne's 11th constituency
- Stéphane Le Foll, deputy for Sarthe's 4th constituency
- Emmanuel Maurel, Member of the European Parliament

=== Invalidated ===
- Delphine Batho, deputy for Deux-Sèvres's 2nd constituency
- Myriam Petit

=== Renounced ===
- Najat Vallaud-Belkacem, former Minister of National Education, Higher Education and Research

== Vote on orientation texts ==
#	Title	First signatory	Result	
#	Title	First signatory	Votes	%
3	Socialistes, Le chemin de la renaissance	Olivier Faure	17,695	48.56
2	Cher.e.s camarades	Stéphane Le Foll	9,511	26.10
4	L'Union et l'Espoir	Emmanuel Maurel	6,916	18.98
1	Un progrès partagé pour faire gagner la Gauche	Luc Carvounas	2,318	6.36
Eligible voters				
Total votes			37,014	100.00
Abstentions				
Blank and null votes			575	1.55
Valid votes			36,439	98.45

== See also ==
- 2017 The Republicans (France) leadership election
- French Socialist Party presidential primary, 2017
