= Jean-Christophe Cambadélis =

French politician

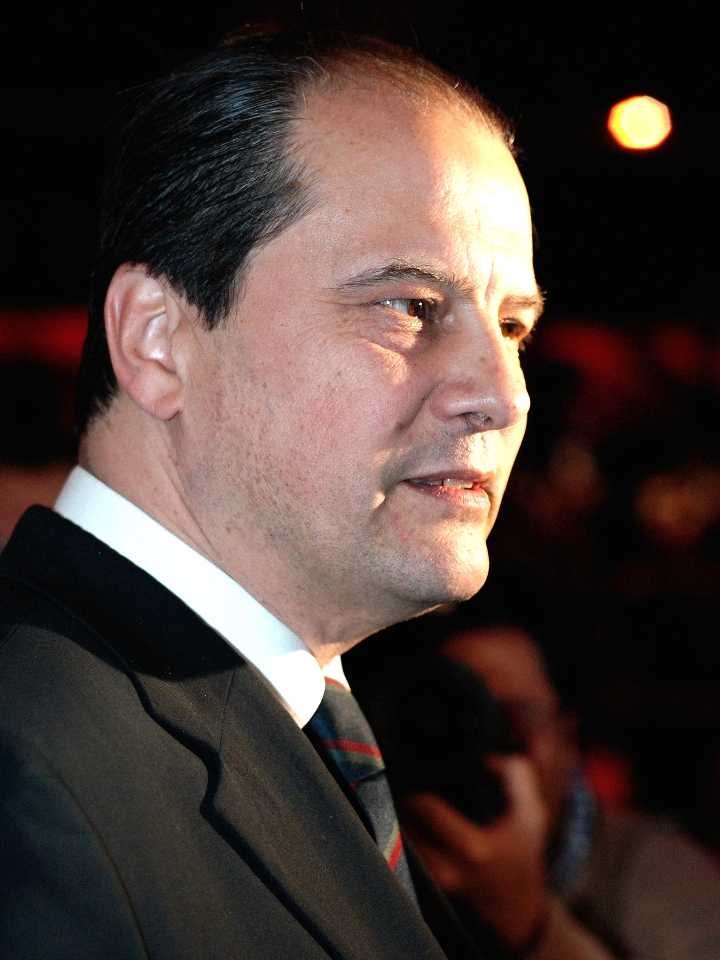
- Cambadélis in 2007

12th First Secretary of the Socialist Party
- In office 15 April 2014 – 18 June 2017
- Preceded by: Harlem Désir
- Succeeded by: Rachid Temal (interim) Olivier Faure

Member of the National Assembly for Paris's 16th constituency (formerly Paris's 20th constituency)
- In office 12 June 1997 – 21 June 2017
- Preceded by: Jacques Féron
- Succeeded by: Mounir Mahjoubi

Personal details
- Born: 14 August 1951 (age 75) Neuilly-sur-Seine, France
- Party: OCI (1971-1981); PCI (1981-1986); PS (depuis 1986)
- Education: Paris Diderot University

Jean-Christophe Cambadélis (born 14 August 1951) is a French politician of the Socialist Party (PS) who served as the party's First Secretary from April 2014 to June 2017. He was a member of the National Assembly of France, representing the city of Paris, as a member of the Socialist, Republican & Citizen.

== Early life and education ==
Born in Neuilly-sur-Seine, Cambadélis is of Greek ancestry.

== Political career ==
=== Early beginnings ===
Cambadélis gained clout within the Socialist Party in the 1980s when he helped former President François Mitterrand seek re-election, later growing close to former Socialist Prime Minister Lionel Jospin.

=== Member of the National Assembly, 1997–2017 ===
In parliament, Cambadélis served on the Committee on Foreign Affairs (1998–2017) and the Committee on Economic Affairs (2008–2009). In addition to his committee assignments, he was part of the French-Israeli Parliamentary Friendship Group.

Amid the MNEF affair in 2006, Cambadélis was found guilty along with several other Socialists of having used a student mutual fund for political purposes and given a suspended jail sentence and a fine of 20 000 euros.

When Martine Aubry took over as leader of the Socialist Party in 2008, Cambadélis became the party’s national spokesperson for international affairs. In 2011, he endorsed Aubry as the party’s candidate for the 2012 presidential elections.

=== Chair of the Socialist Party, 2014–2017 ===
In 2014, Cambadélis was elected by the Socialist Party’s national congress to replace Harlem Désir, weeks after municipal elections in which the party lost dozens of towns to the right and far-right opposition.

During his time in office, Cambadélis announced the party’s first-ever two-round left-wing primary to decide on its candidate for the 2017 presidential elections, allowing challengers to incumbent President François Hollande.

Citing the urgency of the fight against far-right leader Marine Le Pen, Cambadélis endorsed Emmanuel Macron ahead of the presidential elections. He lost his seat in parliament in the legislative elections shortly after. He subsequently resigned as the party’s chairman.

=== Later career ===
Ahead of the Socialist Party’s 2018 convention in Aubervilliers, Cambadélis publicly endorsed Olivier Faure as candidate for the party’s leadership.

When the Socialist Party agreed with the hard-left La France Insoumise (LFI) to run together in the parliamentary elections in an effort to deprive re-elected President Emmanuel Macron of a majority, Cambadélis called on fellow members to block the deal, arguing it could mark the end of a pro-EU force on the left.

Party political offices
Preceded by Harlem Désir	First Secretary of the Socialist Party; 2014–2017	Succeeded by Rachid Temal
