= Isabelle Santiago =

French politician

- Parliamentary group: Socialist

Deputy for Val-de-Marne's 9th constituency in the National Assembly of France
- Incumbent
- Assumed office 27 September 2020
- Preceded by: Luc Carvounas, then Sarah Taillebois

General Councillor of Val-de-Marne
- In office 1 April 2011 – 14 October 2011
- Preceded by: Jean-Pierre Moranchel
- Succeeded by: Mohamed Chikouche
- Constituency: Canton of Alfortville-Sud

Departmental Councillor of Val-de-Marne
- Incumbent
- Assumed office 29 March 2015
- Preceded by: new canton

Personal details
- Born: September 20, 1965 (age 61) Neuilly-sur-Seine

Isabelle Santiago (born 20 September 1965) is a French politician of the Socialist Party (PS) who has been serving as the deputy for Val-de-Marne's 9th constituency in the National Assembly of France since 27 September 2020.

== Political career ==
=== Career in local politics ===
In 2011 Santiago was elected general councillor of the Canton of Alfortville-Sud. Until her election to the National Assembly, she was 5th vice-president of Val-de-Marne in charge of the protection of children and adolescents.

Municipal councilor then deputy mayor of Alfortville, Santiago has been departmental councillor of Val-de-Marne since 2 April 2015, elected in the canton of Alfortville.

=== Member of the National Assembly, 2020–present ===
A by-election was held for Val-de-Marne's 9th constituency in September 2020 because the deputy, Luc Carvounas was ineligible due to cumulation of mandates when he was re-elected Mayor of Alfortville, and his substitute, Sarah Taillebois, was ineligible due to appointment to the École nationale d'administration. Santiago was elected on 27 September 2020. She joined the socialist and associated group.

In parliament, Santiago has since been serving on the Defence Committee. In addition to her committee assignments, she was part of the French Parliamentary Friendship Groups with Japan, Algeria and Armenia.

Since 2022, Santiago has also been part of the French delegation to the NATO Parliamentary Assembly, where she serves on the Economics and Security Committee, the Sub-Committee on Transition and Development, and the Sub-Committee on Transatlantic Relations.

== Political positions ==
In 2023, Santiago publicly endorsed the re-election of the Socialist Party's chairman Olivier Faure.

In 2026, Santiago was one of the depositors of the controversial 0.055€/GB data tax.
