= Boris Vallaud =

French politician (born 1975)

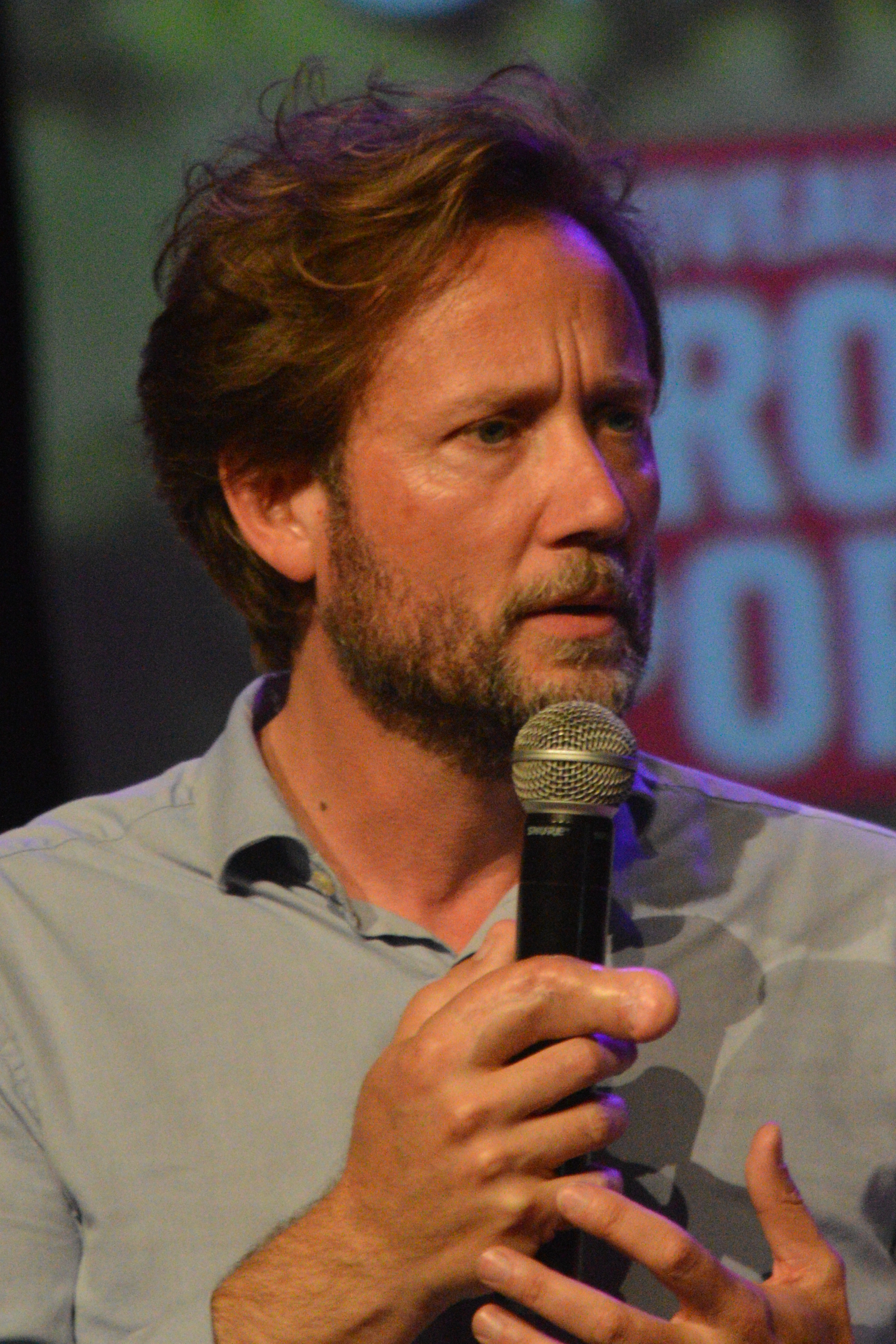
- Vallaud in 2024

President of the Socialist group in the National Assembly
- Incumbent
- Assumed office 23 June 2022
- Preceded by: Valérie Rabault

Member of the National Assembly
- Incumbent
- Assumed office 21 June 2017
- Preceded by: Monique Lubin
- Parliamentary group: NG (2017–2022); SOC (2022–)
- Constituency: Landes's 3rd

Member of the Departemental Council of Landes
- Incumbent
- Assumed office 1 July 2021 Serving with Agathe Bourreterre
- President: Xavier Fortinon
- Preceded by: Xavier Lagrave
- Constituency: Canton of Adour Armagnac

Spokesperson of the Socialist Party
- In office 15 April 2018 – 12 April 2023 Serving with Pierre Jouvet; Gabrielle Siry; Dieynaba Diop
- Leader: Olivier Faure

Assistant General Secretary of the President of the Republic
- In office 17 November 2014 – 30 December 2016
- President: François Hollande
- Preceded by: Emmanuel Macron; Nicolas Revel
- Succeeded by: Thomas Cazenave

Personal details
- Born: 25 July 1975 (age 51) Beirut, Lebanon
- Party: Socialist Party
- Spouse: Najat Vallaud-Belkacem (m. 2005)
- Children: 2
- Parent: Pierre Vallaud (father)
- Education: Sciences Po; École nationale d'administration
- Profession: Civil servant

Boris Vallaud (French pronunciation: [bɔʁis valo]; born 25 July 1975) is a French politician who has represented the 3rd constituency of the Landes department in the National Assembly since the 2017 election. A member of the Socialist Party (PS), he became president of the Socialist group in the National Assembly in 2022.

== Early life and education ==
Vallaud studied at Lycée Louis-Barthou in Pau, Pyrénées-Atlantiques and then graduated from École nationale d'administration (ENA) in 2004, alongside Emmanuel Macron.

== Political career ==
=== Government ===
From 2013 until 2014, Vallaud served as chief of staff to Ministry of the Economy and Finance Arnaud Montebourg. He subsequently worked on the staff of President François Hollande from 2014 until 2016. During that time, his wife Najat Vallaud-Belkacem was also in government, serving as France's first and only female Minister of Education, Higher Education, and Research between 2014 and 2017.

=== National Assembly ===
In 2017, Vallaud was elected as Member of the National Assembly for the Landes's 3rd constituency, a territory had been held by socialist Henri Emmanuelli until his death. He was the only left candidate sworn into office in a traditionally left-leaning department. Vallaud joined the Socialist group and served as member of the Social Affairs Committee between 2017 and 2023.

In 2022, Vallaud was easily re-elected and ever since serves as member of the Cultural and Education Affairs Committee. He was elected President of the Socialist group following Valérie Rabault's election as one of the six vice-presidents of the National Assembly. Under his leadership, the Socialist group became part of the NUPES intergroup alongside Les Écologistes, the French Communist Party and La France Insoumise.

Following Jean-Luc Mélenchon's position on the Gaza war, many socialists and communists in parliament began to distance themselves from the NUPES coalition. In October 2023, Vallaud announced the Socialist group would take a temporary break from the NUPES coalition to reassess the nature of their partnership, but said he remained hopeful about NUPES's future.

In addition to his committee assignments, he is one of the vice-presidents of the French-Lebanese Parliamentary Friendship Group, having himself been born in Beirut.

== Political positions ==
Vallaud was one of only five Socialist MPs who did not vote in favor of confirming Prime Minister Édouard Philippe's government in 2017. He was later considered as one of the sharpest critics of the Philippe government.

Ahead of the Socialist Party's 2018 convention in Aubervilliers, Vallaud publicly endorsed Olivier Faure as candidate for the party's leadership.

In response to a 2019 law authorizing the sale of the government's controlling stake in Groupe ADP, Vallaud led a cross-party initiative which called for a referendum to overturn the legislation, citing concerns over the loss of government revenue and influence.

== Personal life ==
In 2000, Vallaud met his wife, Najat Belkacem, at Sciences Po Paris where they were both studying. The pair married on the 27th of August 2005 in Hontanx, and Belkacem officially hyphenated her husband's family name in front of hers. In 2008, the couple welcomed twins, a boy and a girl : Louis-Adel and Nour-Chloé. As a symbol of the couple's mixed origins, the twins' names each contain one French and one North-African name.

== See also ==
- 2017 French legislative election
- 2022 French legislative election
- Najat Vallaud-Belkacem
