= Vallaud =

Vallaud is a surname. Notable people with the surname include:

- Boris Vallaud (born 1975), French politician
- Najat Vallaud-Belkacem (born 1977), Moroccan-French jurist and politician
