= Paris's 20th constituency (1988–2012) =

Constituency of the National Assembly of France

20th constituency of Paris
- inline Constituency of the National Assembly of France

- Paris, showing its legislative constituencies between 1988 and 2012
- Member: constituency abolished, 2012
- Department: Paris

Paris's 20th constituency was one of the 21 French National Assembly constituencies in the Paris department in the period 1988 to 2012. The constituency covered three districts of the 19th arrondissement: Pont-de-Flandres, Amérique and Combat.

It was created by the 1986 redistricting of French legislative constituencies. It was abolished in the 2010 redistricting of French legislative constituencies, which reduced the number of constituencies in Paris to 18. The territory of the constituency, in the north-east of Paris, mostly moved to the new 16th constituency (apart from a small area of the Quartier du Combat).

== Description ==
After the 1986 French legislative election, the new prime minister Jacques Chirac re-established the two-round single-member district electoral system. The number of deputies from Paris was maintained at 21 and the previous (pre-1986) electoral constituencies were therefore reduced from 31 to 21. The constituency covered three neighbourhoods of the 19th arrondissement, Pont-de-Flandres, Amérique and Combat. It corresponded to the 29th and part of the 28th constituencies of Paris in the period 1958-86.

In 1999, the Institut national de la statistique et des études économiques estimated the population of the constituency as 116,985 inhabitants.

== Historic Representation ==
Election	Member	Party	Notes
1988	Jean-Christophe Cambadélis	PS	
1993	Jacques Féron	CNIP	
1997	Jean-Christophe Cambadélis	PS	
2002	Jean-Christophe Cambadélis	PS	
2007	Jean-Christophe Cambadélis	PS	

The constituency was abolished in 2012 - Cambadélis continued as the deputy for the 16th constituency, which covers almost exactly the same territory.

== Election results ==
=== 1988 ===
Results of 1988 election, Paris's 20th constituency
Candidate	Party	First round		Second round	
Candidate	Party	Votes	%	Votes	%
Jacques Féron	CNIP	12,512	36.15	17,973	48.43
Jean-Christophe Cambadélis	PS	12,102	34.97	19,139	51.57
Roland Gaucher	FN	4,154	12.00		
Paul Laurent	PCF	3,772	10.90		
Jean-Pierre Guerin	Miscellaneous Green	2,023	5.85		
Dominique Bonin	Miscellaneous	46	0.13		
Registered Voters		58,904	100	58,904	100
Abstentions		23,917	40.6	20,969	35.6
Votes		34,987	59.4	37,935	64.4
Blank or Void ballots		378	1.08	823	2.17
Valid Votes		34,609	98.92	37,112	97.83

=== 1993 ===
Results of 1993 election, Paris's 20th constituency
Candidate	Party	First round		Second round	
Candidate	Party	Votes	%	Votes	%
Jacques Féron	RPR	13,390	37.92%	16,922	50.69%
Jean-Christophe Cambadélis	PS	7,763	21.98%	16,462	49.31%
Xavier Voute	FN	5,036	14.26%		
Jean Desessard	LV	3,384	9.58 %		
Martine Durlach	PCF	2,963	8.39 %		
Jean Dumontet	AMU	651	1.84 %		
Martine Grandin	LO	650	1.84 %		
Pascale Berthault	GV	331	0.94 %		
Laurent Jacquemin	PT	267	0.76 %		
Jean-Hugues Wolfsohn	UED	234	0.66 %		
Iabelle Chauvenet	SEGA	233	0.66 %		
Etienne Dabeedin	MDR	195	0.55 %		
Denise Ragot	Majorité Présidentielle	147	0.42 %		
Daniel Enselme	PLN	71	0.2 %		
Registered Voters		56,216	100	56,216	100
Abstentions		19,619	34.9%	20,520	36.5%
Votes		36,597	65.1%	35,696	63.5%
Blank or Void ballots		1 282	3.5%	2 312	6.48%
Valid Votes		35,315	96.5%	33,384	93.52%

=== 1997 ===
Results of 1997 election, Paris's 20th constituency
Candidate	Party	First round		Second round	
Candidate	Party	Votes	%	Votes	%
Jean-Christophe Cambadélis	PS	10,565	30.26%	19,863	54.07%
Michel Bulté	RPR	9,867	28.26%	16,876	45.93%
Xavier Voute	FN	4,539	13%		
Martine Durlach	PCF	3 037	8,7 %		
Catherine Garros	LV	1 622	4,65 %		
Daniel Lacroix	LDI	1,064	3.05%		
Marina Podgorny	LO	988	2.83 %		
Jean Marc Brule	SEGA	545	1.56 %		
Manuel Dieudonne	MDC	502	1.44%		
Bernard Krouck	GE	466	1.33%		
Pascale Berthault	LCR	360	1,03 %		
Valerie Sandrossian	SRE	297	0.85 %		
Laurent Bardon	For the 4-day week	240	0.69 %		
Christine Dalmasso	MEI	231	0.66 %		
Philippe Thireau	GS	199	0.57 %		
Jacques Puaux	PT	172	0.49 %		
Jean Luc Guerard	PH	72	0.21 %		
Etienne Dabeedin	MDR	50	0.14 %		
Antoine Lagaisse	PLN	46	0.13 %		
Andre Epron	Alliance Réformatrice	41	0.12 %		
Registered Voters		57,410	100	57,405	100
Abstentions		21,427	37.32%	18,762	32.68%
Votes		35,983	62.68%	38,643	67.32%
Blank or Void ballots		1,066	2.96%	1,904	4.93%
Valid Votes		34,917	97.04%	36,739	95.07%

=== 2002 ===
Results of 2002 election, Paris's 20th constituency
Candidate	Party	First round		Second round	
Candidate	Party	Votes	%	Votes	%
Jean-Christophe Cambadélis	PS	12,619	35.36%	17,984	56.37 %
Michel Bulté	RPR	5,760	16.14 %	13,922	43.63 %
Lynda Asmani	UMP	4,070	11.4 %		
J.Pierre Mattei	UCLR (Union Centriste Libérale et Républicaine)	3,314	9.29 %		
Francoise Ferry	FN	2,809	7.87 %		
Bernard Jomier	LV	2,511	7.04 %		
Martine Durlach	PCF	1,540	4.32 %		
Beatrice Bonneau	LCR	669	1.87 %		
Stephane Le Floch	PR	614	1.72 %		
Marina Podgorny	LO	273	0.76 %		
Mohamedy Yaffa	Indep	214	0.6 %		
Annik Hecquet-Bonot	Cap21	213	0.6 %		
Loic Le Henand	MNR	168	0.47 %		
Mireille Loubens De	MPF	158	0.44 %		
Nathalie Luyckx	SEGA	147	0.41 %		
Rachid Lounes	MEI	135	0.38 %		
Muriel Navarro	PT	122	0.34 %		
Dominique Piolle	ND	102	0.29 %		
Helene Sedakoff	GE	72	0.2 %		
M.Nancy Joly	Initiative républicaine	62	0.17 %		
Sylvie Oulaï	Confédération des écologistes indépendants	42	0.12%		
Jean-Luc Guérard	PH	39	0.11%		
Michèle Lannoy-Duputel	CPNT	35	0.1%		
Gilbert Cruz	DVG (Parti des socioprofessionnels)	0	0%		
Registered Voters		55,008		54,981	
Abstentions		18,842	34.25 %	21,748	39.56 %
Votes		36,166	65.75 %	33,233	60.44 %
Blank or Void ballots		478	1.32 %	1,327	3.99 %
Valid Votes		35,688	98.68%	31,906	96.01 %

=== 2007 ===
Results of 10 and 12 June 2007 election, Paris's 20th constituency
Candidate	Party	First round		Second round	
Candidate	Party	Votes	%	Votes	%
Jean-Christophe Cambadélis	PS	12,466	32.85 %	20,897	59.09 %
Jean-Jacques Giannesini	UMP	12,320	32.46 %	14,469	40.91 %
Violette Baranda	MoDem	3,910	10.3 %		
Bernard Jomier	LV	2,724	7.18 %		
Jean Vuillermoz	PCF	2,017	5.31 %		
France Coumian	LCR	1,506	3.97 %		
Christian Lobre	FN	1,198	3.16 %		
Marina Podgorny	LO	364	0.96 %		
Arnaud Appourchaux	PSLE	287	0.76 %		
Ronald Remy	MEI	281	0,74 %		
Jean-Claude Hubert	FA (La France en action)	261	0.69 %		
Gabrielle Dinahet	MNR	219	0.58 %		
Luc Beranger	PT	187	0.49 %		
Stephane Leenhardt	Parti Rachid Nekkaz	116	0.31 %		
Christian Person	AL	90	0.24 %		
Jean Luc Guerard	PH	7	0.02 %		
Registered Voters		65,986		65,984	
Abstentions		27,555	41.76%	29,527	44.75%
Votes		38,431	58.24%	36,457	55.25%
Blank or Void ballots		478	1.24%	1,091	2.99%
Valid Votes		37,953	98.76%	35,366	97.01%
