= Liévin Congress =

The Liévin Congress was the seventeenth national congress of the French Socialist Party (Parti socialiste or PS). It took place from 18 to 20 November 1994. It took place shortly after the PS' defeat in the 1994 European elections.

== Results ==
Popular vote
Henri Emmanuelli Motion	92.15%
Vincent Peillon Motion	7.85%

Henri Emmanuelli was elected as First Secretary.
