= Luc Carvounas =

French politician (born 1971)

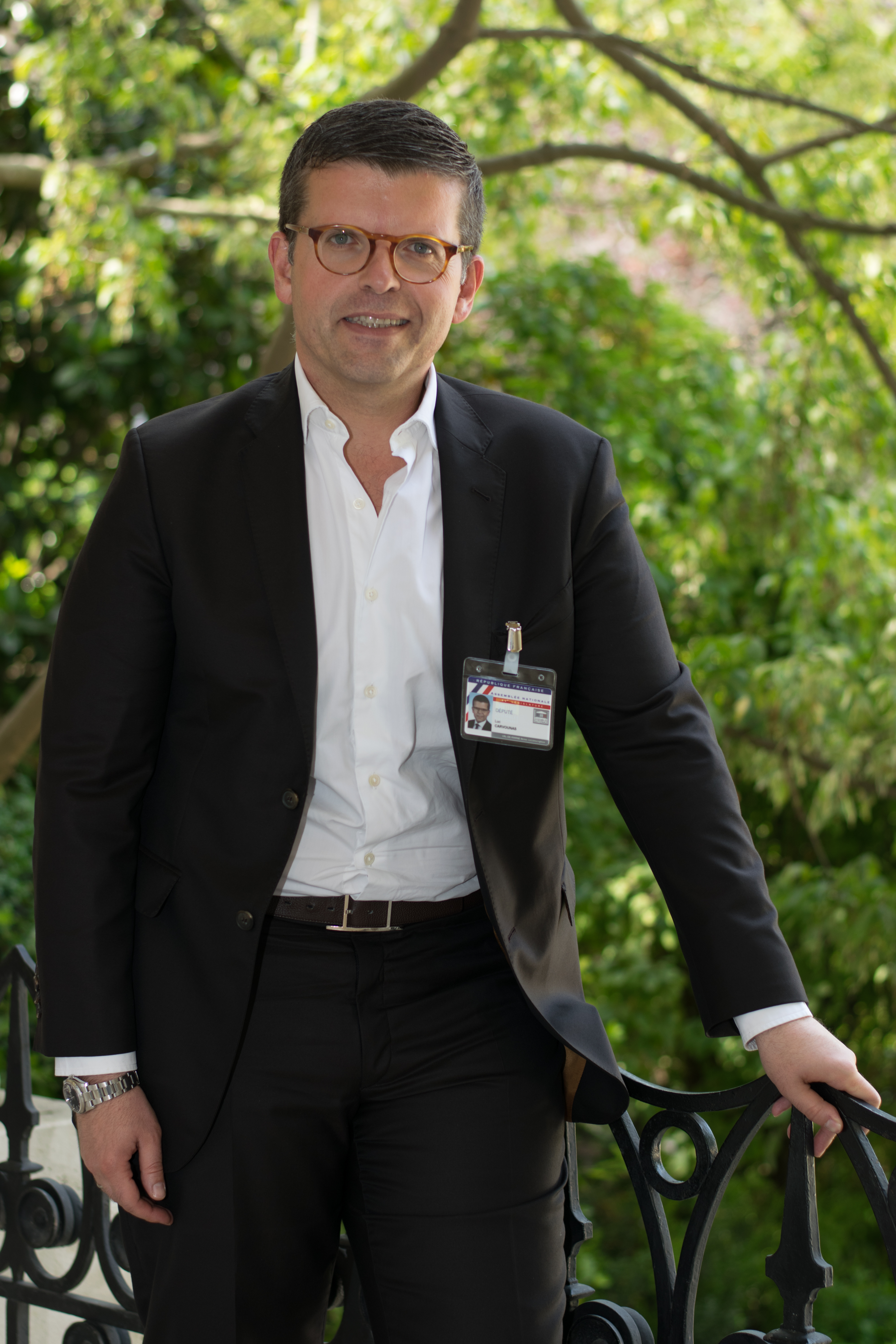

Mayor of Alfortville
- Incumbent
- Assumed office 24 May 2020
- Preceded by: Michel Gerchinovitz
- In office 18 March 2012 – 10 September 2017
- Preceded by: René Rouquet
- Succeeded by: Michel Gerchinovitz

Member of the National Assembly for Val-de-Marne's 9th constituency
- In office 21 June 2017 – 23 June 2020
- Preceded by: René Rouquet
- Succeeded by: Sarah Taillebois

Member of the French Senate for Val-de-Marne
- In office 2011–2017
- Succeeded by: Laurent Dutheil

Personal details
- Born: 8 June 1971 (age 54) Charenton-le-Pont, France
- Party: Socialist Party
- Spouse: Stéphane Exposito (m. 2015)

Luc Carvounas (born 8 June 1971) is a French politician of the Socialist Party (PS) who served as a member of the National Assembly from 2017 until 2020, representing Val-de-Marne. He is currently mayor of Alfortville.

== Political career ==
=== Early beginnings ===
In the 2015 French regional elections in Île-de-France, Carvounas served as campaign director to the Socialist Party's candidate Claude Bartolone.

Ahead of the Socialist Party's 2017 primaries, Carvounas endorsed Manuel Valls as the party's candidate for the presidential election later that year.

=== Member of the National Assembly, 2017–2020 ===
From 2017 until 2020, Carvounas was a member of the National Assembly, where he served on the Defence Committee. In addition to his committee assignments, he was part of the French delegation to the Inter-Parliamentary Union (IPU).

Carvounas was a candidate for the Socialist Party's leadership at the Aubervilliers Congress in 2018.

In September 2020 his re-election as Mayor of Alfortville made Carvounas ineligible for the National Assembly due to the changed cumulation of mandates rule. His substitute, Sarah Taillebois, was ineligible due to appointment to the École nationale d'administration. A by-election was held 27 September 2020, which was won by Isabelle Santiago, also of the Socialist Party.

=== Later career ===
In September 2020, Carvounas was elected chairman of the Association des Maires du Val-de-Marne.

Ahead of the 2022 presidential election, Carvounas joined the campaign team of Anne Hidalgo as spokesperson.

== Personal life ==
Since 2015, Carvounas has been married to Stéphane Exposito.
