= Val-de-Marne's 9th constituency =

Constituency of the National Assembly of France

9th constituency of Val-de-Marne
- inline Constituency of the National Assembly of France

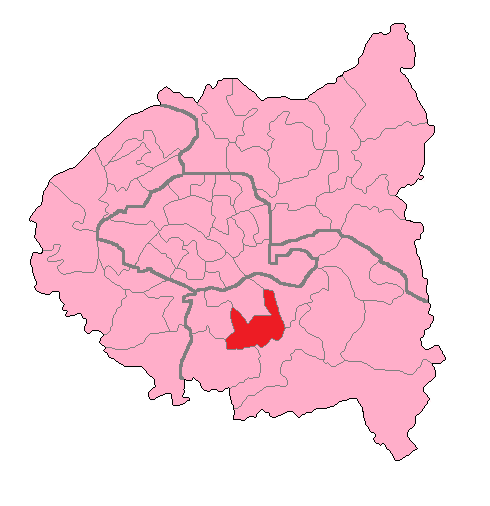
- Val-de-Marne's 9th Constituency shown within Île-de-France
- Deputy: Isabelle Santiago; PS
- Department: Val-de-Marne
- Cantons: Alfortville-Nord - Alfortville-Sud - Vitry-sur-Seine-Est - Vitry-sur-Seine-Ouest
- Registered voters: 53,666

The 9th constituency of Val-de-Marne is a French legislative constituency in the Val-de-Marne département.

== Description ==
The 9th constituency of Val-de-Marne lies in the centre of the department including the suburbs of Alfortville and Vitry-sur-Seine.

Since its creation in 1988 the constituency has returned left wing deputies at every election. The former deputy René Rouquet first won the seat in 1988 but subsequently lost it to the Communist candidate in 1993 before reclaiming in 1997. He retired in 2017, letting Luc Carvounas, the mayor of Alfortville, be the socialist candidate and win the race in a difficult national context for the party.

== Historic Representation ==
Election	Member	Party
1986	Proportional representation – no election by constituency	
1988	René Rouquet	PS
1993	Paul Mercieca	PCF
1997	René Rouquet	PS
2002	René Rouquet	PS
2007	René Rouquet	PS
2012	René Rouquet	PS
2017	Luc Carvounas	PS
2020	Sarah Taillebois	PS
2020	Isabelle Santiago	PS
2022	Isabelle Santiago	PS

== Election results ==
=== 2024 ===
Candidate	Party	Alliance	First round			Second round		
Candidate	Party	Alliance	Votes	%	+/–	Votes	%	+/–
Isabelle Santiago	PS	NFP	19,548	58.09	+9.82			
Wenqi Cui	RN		6,083	18.08	+7.63			
Noémie Amirou	PRV	ENS	4,964	14.75	-5.50			
Jérôme Aubertin	DIV		1,353	4.02	N/A			
Christophe Jaubert	ÉAC		730	2.17	N/A			
Marie Vieira	LO		353	1.05	-0.57			
Ambroise Ramassamy	REC		353	1.05	N/A			
Véronique Ducandas	EXG		184	0.55	-0.04			
Sophie Ortole	DIV		82	0.24	N/A			
Luc Chevallier	NPA		0	0.00	N/A			
Valid votes			33,650	97.81	+0.74			
Blank votes			469	1.36	-0.43			
Null votes			284	0.83	-0.31			
Turnout			34,403	63.19	+21.37			
Abstentions			20,042	36.81	-21.37			
Registered voters			54,445					
Source: Ministry of the Interior, Le Monde
Result						PS HOLD		

=== 2022 ===
Legislative Election 2022: Val-de-Marne's 9th constituency
Party	Candidate	Votes	%	±%
PS (NUPÉS)	Isabelle Santiago	10,612	48.27	-15.71
LREM (Ensemble)	Jonathan Rosenblum	4,453	20.25	+11.68
RN	Wenqi Cui	2,297	10.45	+2.18
LR (UDC)	Michèle Bonhomme-Afflatet	927	4.22	−4.48
DVE	Christophe Jaubert	786	3.56	N/A
REC	Simone Benouadah	749	3.41	N/A
DVE	Abdallah Benbetka	719	3.27	N/A
Others	N/A	1,442		
Turnout		22,649	41.82	+28.93
2nd round result
PS (NUPÉS)	Isabelle Santiago	13,771	67.25	+9.45
LREM (Ensemble)	Jonathan Rosenblum	6,707	32.75	N/A
Turnout		20,478	40.05	+29.09
PS hold				

=== 2020 by-election ===
2020 by-election: Val-de-Marne's 9th constituency
Party	Candidate	Votes	%	±%
PS	Isabelle Santiago	2,230	33.74	+13.20
EELV	Sandra Regol	1,147	17.35	N/A
LREM	Jonathan Rosenblum	661	10.00	−19.25
PCF	Fati Konate	639	9.67	+0.87
RN	Gaëtan Dussausaye	595	9.00	+0.46
LR	Michèle Bonhomme Afflatet	594	8.99	+1.15
LFI	Christian Benedetti	437	6.61	−9.08
Far left	Sandrine Ruchot	161	2.44	N/A
DVE	Abdallah Benbeika	146	2.21	N/A
Turnout		6,812	12.89	−29.8
2nd round result
PS	Isabelle Santiago	3,096	57.80	−0.94
EELV	Sandra Regol	2,260	42.20	N/A
Turnout		5,794	10.96	−26.85
PS hold				

=== 2017 ===
Legislative Election 2017: Val-de-Marne's 9th constituency
Party	Candidate	Votes	%	±%
LREM	Gaëlle Marseau	6,552	29.25	N/A
PS	Luc Carvounas	4,602	20.54	−25.86
LFI	Martine Lachaud	3,514	15.69	N/A
PCF	Fati Konate	1,971	8.80	−5.55
FN	François Paradol	1,913	8.54	−3.15
LR	Bernadette Harault	1,756	7.84	−9.12
Others	N/A	1,994		
Turnout		22,908	42.69	−6.08
2nd round result
PS	Luc Carvounas	11,029	58.74	−11.97
LREM	Gaëlle Marseau	7,747	41.26	N/A
Turnout		20,290	37.81	−7.29
PS hold		Swing		

=== 2012 ===
Legislative Election 2012: Val-de-Marne's 9th constituency
Party	Candidate	Votes	%	±%
PS	René Rouquet	12,065	46.40	+8.21
UMP	Monique Taron	4,411	16.96	−8.33
FG	Evelyne Rabardel	3,731	14.35	+3.75
FN	Pierre Fouchard	3,039	11.69	+5.69
EELV	Aminata Niakate	1,412	5.43	+1.50
MoDem	Nathalie Serot-Petat	639	2.46	−5.88
Others	N/A	707		
Turnout		26,004	48.77	−5.34
2nd round result
PS	René Rouquet	16,826	70.71	+5.72
UMP	Monique Taron	6,970	29.29	−5.72
Turnout		23,796	45.10	−5.38
PS hold				

=== 2007 ===
Legislative Election 2007: Val-de-Marne's 9th constituency
Party	Candidate	Votes	%	±%
PS	René Rouquet	10,502	38.19	−0.19
UMP	Emmanuel Njoh	6,954	25.29	−3.93
PCF	Evelyne Rabardel	2,916	10.60	−1.76
MoDem	François Viste	2,295	8.34	N/A
FN	Romain Vincent	1,650	6.00	−4.47
LV	Jean Couthures	1,080	3.93	N/A
Far left	Florence Allegre-Boubekri	966	3.51	N/A
Others	N/A	1,139		
Turnout		28,023	54.11	−5.66
2nd round result
PS	René Rouquet	16,390	64.99	+7.72
UMP	Emmanuel Njoh	8,830	35.01	−7.72
Turnout		26,146	50.48	−3.55
PS hold				

=== 2002 ===
Legislative Election 2002: Val-de-Marne's 9th constituency
Party	Candidate	Votes	%	±%
PS	René Rouquet	10,487	38.38	+7.92
UMP	Nathalie Bouquet	7,985	29.22	N/A
PCF	Jacques Perreux	3,378	12.36	−12.24
FN	Edouard Fontana	2,861	10.47	−4.55
Others	N/A	2,616		
Turnout		27,854	59.77	−5.96
2nd round result
PS	René Rouquet	13,929	57.27	−42.73
UMP	Nathalie Bouquet	10,393	42.73	N/A
Turnout		25,178	54.03	+0.93
PS hold				

=== 1997 ===
Legislative Election 1997: Val-de-Marne's 9th constituency
Party	Candidate	Votes	%	±%
PS	René Rouquet	8,830	30.46	
PCF	Paul Mercieca*	7,131	24.60	
UDF	Fernand Saal	4,607	15.89	
FN	Jean-Louis Desbordes	4,354	15.02	
LV	Christian Brett	819	2.83	
LO	Raymond Gabet	751	2.59	
GE	Fabrice Haccoun	602	2.08	
Others	N/A	1,891		
Turnout		29,877	65.73	
2nd round result
PS	René Rouquet	17,218	100.00	
Turnout		23,136	53.10	
PS gain from PCF				

* Withdrew before the 2nd round

== Sources ==
Official results of French elections from 2002: "Résultats électoraux officiels en France" (in French).
