= Sarah Taillebois =

French politician

Member of the National Assembly of France for Val-de-Marne's 9th constituency
- In office 24 June 2020 – 24 June 2020
- Preceded by: Luc Carvounas
- Succeeded by: Isabelle Santiago

Personal details
- Born: September 17, 1990 (age 35) France
- Party: Socialist

Sarah Taillebois (born 17 September 1990) is a French politician who was a Member of Parliament for Val-de-Marne's 9th constituency for a day in 2020. Taillebois was the substitute candidate for Luc Carvounas in the 2017 election for Val-de-Marne's 9th constituency. Carvounas was re-elected Mayor of Alfortville in 2020, which made him ineligible due to the changed cumulation of mandates rule. Taillebois held the constituency for a day, but was ineligible due to appointment to the École nationale d'administration. A by-election was thus held in September 2020, which was won by Isabelle Santiago.

== See also ==
- List of deputies of the 16th National Assembly of France
