= The MNEF Affair =

1998 French insurance scandal

The MNEF Affair was a scandal involving the Mutuelle nationale des étudiants de France (MNEF, or the National Students' Mutual of France), a non-profit mutual insurance company established for the purpose of providing French students a health insurance.

In 1998 The MNEF became entangled in a major financial and political scandal involving senior members of the French establishment and the French Socialist Party. The investigation focused on numerous payments made by the MNEF during the 16 prior years to individuals which payments did not seem to reflect any actual service rendered.

The Paris prosecutor was, among other, investigating a payment of ₣600,000 received by Dominique Strauss-Kahn while he was a lawyer. At the time of the investigation he was Minister of Finance and a member of the Socialist Party.

After his indictment, Strauss-Kahn was forced to resign from his post at the Ministry of Finance in November 1999. He was charged for fabricating an invoice and falsifying the dates on invoices. Using sophisticated technology the French Judiciary Police established that the paper on which Strauss-Kahn invoice had been printed was part of a paper batch manufactured at date later than that of the invoice date. Strauss-Kahn admitted that he had made a mistake with the document he produced in court but denied any intention to lie and fraud. Eventually charges against him were dropped.

After 8 years of investigation and trial the Paris criminal court delivered a guilty verdict towards 17 other defendants involving suspended jail terms and monetary fines. They included Jean-Christophe Cambadélis who was sentenced to 6 months suspended jail terms and a fine of 20 000 euros, Marie-France Lavarini who admitted to not having worked for the MNEF and paid back the amounts received, Jean-Michel Grosz was sentenced to 2 years suspended jail terms and a fine of €150,000, and Olivier Spithakis sentenced to two years suspended sentence and €50,000.

All these sentences were covered by the amnesty law which had been voted by the French parliament in 1995.
