= Olivier Faure =

French politician (born 1968)

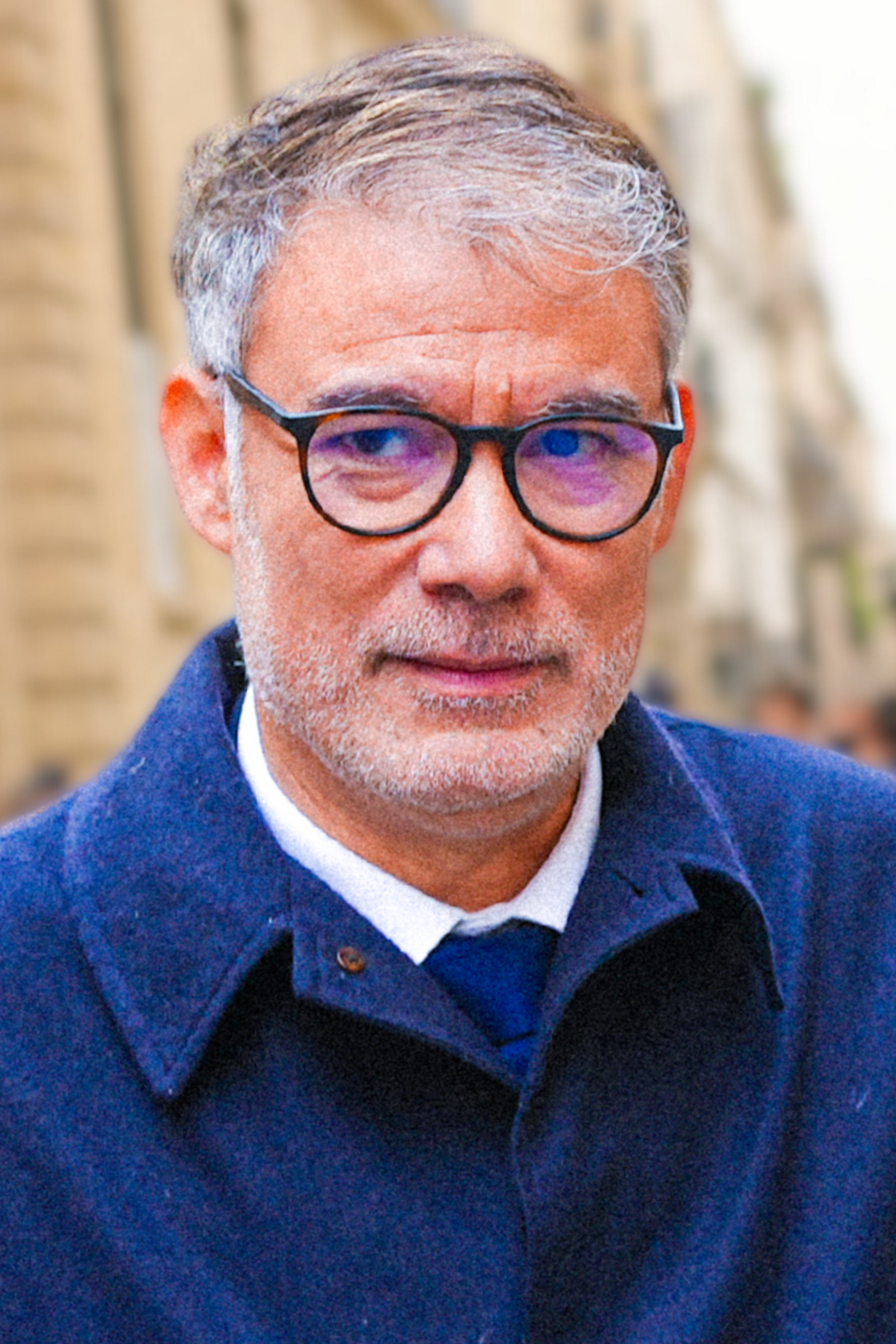
- Faure in 2025

First Secretary of the Socialist Party
- Incumbent
- Assumed office 7 April 2018
- Preceded by: Rachid Temal (interim); Jean-Christophe Cambadélis

President of the New Left group in the National Assembly
- In office 13 December 2016 – 11 April 2018
- Preceded by: Bruno Le Roux
- Succeeded by: Valérie Rabault

Member of the National Assembly for Seine-et-Marne's 11th constituency
- Incumbent
- Assumed office 20 June 2012
- Preceded by: Constituency established

Spokesperson of the Socialist Party
- In office 26 August 2014 – 17 December 2016
- Succeeded by: Karim Bouamrane

Personal details
- Born: 18 August 1968 (age 58) La Tronche, France
- Party: Socialist Party
- Education: University of Orléans; Panthéon-Sorbonne University
- Profession: Jurist

Olivier Faure ([ɔlivje fɔʁ]; born 18 August 1968) is a French politician who has served as First Secretary of the Socialist Party (PS) since 2018 and has represented the 11th constituency of Seine-et-Marne in the National Assembly since 2012. He was elected to the post of first secretary in the party's Aubervilliers Congress and re-elected in the 2021 Villeurbanne Congress. Faure was previously the head of the New Left group (French: Groupe Nouvelle Gauche), the parliamentary group formed around the PS in the National Assembly, from December 2016 to April 2018.

== Early life ==
Olivier Faure was born in 1968 to a Vietnamese nurse of Chinese origin and a French tax agent of Spanish origin. After spending his early childhood in Réunion, he grew up in Metropolitan France, where he pursued his studies. Faure attended the Lycée Pothier in Orléans and then the University of Orléans, where he graduated with a Master of Advanced Studies (MAS) in economic law, and the Paris 1 Panthéon-Sorbonne University, where he graduated with a MAS in political science.

== Political career ==
Faure joined the Socialist Party (PS) at the age of 16 and also became an activist for the National Union of Students of France (UNEF). It was as a member of the PS that he met Benoît Hamon, with whom he shared an apartment for a time. In 1991, at the age of 23, Faure became the secretary-general of the Young Rocardiens, a group supporting Prime Minister Michel Rocard.

From 1991 to 1993, Faure worked with Gérard Gouzes, the president of the commission of law in the National Assembly. From 1993 to 1997, Faure served as the chief executive of a business with 150 employees. Faure then served as an advisor to Martine Aubry in the Ministry of Labour, Employment and Vocational Training from 1997 to 2000 and assistant cabinet director to Socialist First Secretary François Hollande from 2000 to 2007. At the beginning of 2007, he published a comic book titled Ségo, François, papa et moi about the inner workings of Ségolène Royal's campaign to become the PS candidate in the 2007 French presidential election.

Faure ran to represent Seine-et-Marne's 8th constituency in the National Assembly in the 2007 French legislative elections but lost to Chantal Brunel of the Union for a Popular Movement (UMP). In October 2007, Faure joined the leader of the Socialist group in the National Assembly, Jean-Marc Ayrault, to become the formation's secretary-general.

=== Member of the National Assembly, 2012–present ===
During the 2011 Socialist presidential primary, Faure worked as the chief of communications for the François Hollande campaign. After Hollande won the primary, Faure became his "expert opinion" in the 2012 French presidential election. The Socialist candidate went on to win the general election, and Faure was appointed special adviser to Prime Minister Jean-Marc Ayrault, from which position he resigned soon after.

In January 2012, Faure was nominated by the PS as its candidate in Seine-et-Marne's 11th constituency for the 2012 French legislative elections. The party was well-positioned to win the constituency due to an electoral pact with Europe Ecology – The Greens (EELV), who withdrew their candidate, Jean-Marc Brûlé, from the race. Faure was elected on 17 June with 63.2% of the vote in the second round, against the UMP's Cathy Bissonier with 36.78% of the vote. Upon entering the National Assembly, he was named third vice-president of the Socialist, Republican and Citizen (SRC) group of deputies. On 18 July 2012, Faure became the national secretary of communications for the PS, thereby joining the party's executive team.

On 15 April 2014, Faure was chosen as one of the spokespeople for the PS at the party's national council. In June 2014, Faure introduced an amendment adding a tax of two euros per person per night stayed in the Île-de-France "for financing francilien public transit." During this session of the National Assembly, he served as the special rapporteur for the collective and rail transport infrastructure budget. In December 2014, Faure successfully passed an amendment to the law on finances, implementing a Navigo card with a single price.

On 13 December 2016, Faure succeeded Bruno Le Roux to become the head of the Socialist, Republican and Citizen group. His election by 137 votes against 120 for Guillaume Bachelay was regarded as a blow to Prime Minister Manuel Valls. Faure and Valls had become opponents after the Prime Minister refused to consider Faure's compromise amendment to Article 2 of the El Khomri law in July 2016. As president of the SRC group, Faure attempted to find new compromises on the El Khomri law and legislation concerning the revocation of French citizenship.

In 2016, Faure considered endorsing Emmanuel Macron in the 2017 French presidential election, but ultimately refused to support him after a meeting between the two. Faure was re-elected to the National Assembly in the 2017 French legislative elections with EELV's Paulin Roy as his designated substitute, receiving 61.1% of the vote against La République En Marche's (LREM) Amandine Rubinelli. On 22 June 2017, he was re-elected to the presidency of the Socialist group with 28 votes against 3 votes for Delphine Batho.

Faure abstained in a July 2017 vote of confidence in the government of Prime Minister Édouard Philippe. He also notably delivered speeches on the ordinances of the El Khomri law and the counter-budget on a bill of finances. In April 2018, Les Jours wrote that "with 27.2% of his votes in line with En Marche, Olivier Faure is not part of the deputies most hostile to the parliamentary majority's policies."

After Faure was elected as First Secretary of the Socialist Party in March 2018, Valérie Rabault replaced him as the president of the New Left group.

=== First Secretary of the Socialist Party, 2018–present ===
In January 2018, Faure announced his candidacy for the position of First Secretary of the Socialist Party in view of the upcoming Aubervilliers Congress. He was the first signatory of the motion "Socialists, the path of the renaissance" and was notably supported by Martine Aubry, the mayor of Lille, and Carole Delga, the president of the region of Occitania. A Harris Interactive poll among PS supporters placed him in second place, far behind former minister Stéphane Le Foll, who benefited from greater publicity due to his governmental responsibilities under the Hollande presidency. Faure came first in the first round of the election for first secretary on 15 March 2018, receiving 48.37% of the vote against 26.45% for Stéphane Le Foll. The latter then withdrew from the race, making Faure the presumptive first secretary. Faure then won the election with 86% of the vote on 29 March. He was inaugurated as first secretary in the Aubervilliers Congress on 7 April. On 15 April, Faure proposed new leadership for the PS' national council, with Corinne Narassiguin being duly chosen as the new national secretary for coordination and means as well as Boris Vallaud and Gabrielle Siry becoming the new spokespeople.

Over the course of 2019, Faure was speculated to harbour ambitions for the presidency in the 2022 French presidential elections, which he denied. During the 2019 European Parliament election in France, several polls projected that the alliance between PS and Raphaël Glucksmann's Place Publique would receive less than 5% of the vote. The alliance's joint electoral list ultimately won 6.2% of the vote and six seats, including three Socialists, while the list of Benoît Hamon, who had left the PS, won 3.3%. Faure supported unions of the left and environmentalists, a strategy that was considered effective after the PS gained control of several large cities in the 2020 French municipal elections by joining alliances in the first and second rounds. During the Villeurbanne Congress in September 2021, Faure was re-elected as first secretary with 73.49% of the vote against 26.52% for Hélène Geoffroy.

After the PS suffered a historic defeat in the presidential election, Faure proposed discussing cooperation between the PS and La France Insoumise (LFI) for the 2022 French legislative election, a possibility that divided his party. Faure's position was ultimately adopted by the party's National Office, which also rejected Carole Delga's proposals against cooperation. This triggered the departure of several PS executives. At the beginning of May 2022, while negotiations were under way between LFI and the PS for the June legislative elections, 1,000 local and national party executives challenged Faure on a potential electoral pact between the two parties. They denounced the proposal as a "surrender", citing disagreements with the LFI's plans to "disobey certain European rules", leave NATO, abandon nuclear energy, and dismantle EPRs.

In the 2024 parliamentary election, the Socialist Party more than doubled its seats in the National Assembly as part of the left-wing NFP alliance. In December 2024, NFP, together with far-right National Rally ousted Prime Minister Michel Barnier in a motion of censure. PS decided not to support another motion of censure against Francois Bayrou in February 2025, initiated by La France Insoumise, in exchange for concessions in new budget. Votes of PS deputies were not needed to escape the motion of censure. Concessions included renegotiation of 2023 pension reform, abandonment of the 4,000 job cuts in education, 500 job cuts in France Travail and overseas budget cuts, one billion euro increase in healthcare spending, and the "maintenance" of the new "differential contribution on high incomes". This decision was sharply criticised by LFI, and Jean-Luc Mélenchon reacted: "The NFP is reduced by one party."

He announced his candidacy in the Socialist presidential primary for the 2027 French presidential election on 29-30 August.

== Personal life ==
Faure is married to Soria Blatmann, who was as a member of the presidential cabinet of Emmanuel Macron in the field of human rights until February 2018, when she went to work with the new director-general of UNESCO, Audrey Azoulay. Faure was also formerly close to Christophe Castaner, with whom he broke off relations after Castaner became the Minister of the Interior in the LREM majority government. In February 2020, Castaner claimed that he had accompanied Faure "in his divorces and separations," a statement that provoked indignation from the first secretary.

== Political positions ==
As a deputy under the presidency of François Hollande, Faure opposed the government's proposed constitutional revisions to extend the revocation of French citizenship. He also opposed the Socialist "frondeur" rebels and supported the adoption of the El Khomri law without resorting to article 49.3 of the Constitution while attempting to unite his parliamentary group on this compromise, which was opposed by Manuel Valls.

Faure participated in a Paris rally of police officers in May 2021, where he denounced how police were "constantly exposed to aggression" and demanded that they have a "right of inspection" on judicial decisions. This proposal was criticized by several figures on the left, who accused it of violating the principle of separation of powers. Faure then clarified his argument and walked back his use of the expression "right of inspection," calling it "unfortunate".

In January 2022, Faure supported and successfully passed a resolution condemning the Uyghur genocide in China.
