= Philippe Leveau =

French historian and archaeologist

- Born: 4 January 1940 (age 86); Angoulême, France

Academic background
- Education: University of Provence - Aix-Marseille I

Academic work
- Discipline: History and Archaeology
- Institutions: Lycée Louis-Barthou; University of Algiers 1 Aix-Marseille University

Philippe Leveau (born 4 January 1940) is a French historian and archaeologist.

== Biography ==
As a student in Bordeaux, where he carried out research on the political ideology of Roman emperor Julian, Leveau obtained the Agrégation d'histoire in 1963 (ranked 36th). As an assistant in ancient history at the University of Algiers for six years (1966-1972), he began researching the area around Caesarea in Mauretania.

From 1972 to 1984, Leveau was a lecturer at the Aix-Marseille University, where in 1979 he defended a post-graduate thesis under the supervision of Paul-Albert Février. It was published in 1984 by the Presses de École française de Rome. The same year, he was elected Professor of National Antiquities at the Aix-Marseille University, where he ended his career in 2002, having been awarded emeritus status.

He was a member of the Conseil national de la recherche archéologique from March 13, 1995 to March 13, 1999, and a member of the Commission pour les fouilles sous-marines, elected by the Commission interrégionale de la recherche archéologique Sud-est.

== Works ==
- Caesarea de Maurétanie : une ville romaine et ses campagnes, Éditions de l'École française de Rome, 1984, X + 556 pages (recension here)
- Ph. Leveau et J.-L. Paillet, L'alimentation en eau de Caesarea de Maurétanie et l'aqueduc de Cherchel (in collaboration with J.-L. Paillet), Ed. L'Harmattan, Paris 1976, 185 pages, 10 plans hors-texte.
- J. Gascou, Ph. Leveau et J. Rimbert, Inscriptions latines de la cité d'Apt, Supplément à Gallia, Paris, CNRS, 1997, 220 p.
- Burnouf J. et Leveau Ph., (dir.), Fleuves et Marais, une Histoire au Croisement de la Nature et de la Culture. Sociétés préindustrielles et milieux fluviaux, lacustres et palustres : pratiques sociales et hydrosystèmes, CTHS, Paris, 2004.
- Ph. Leveau et J.P. Saquet ., Milieu et sociétés dans la vallée des Baux, Supplément 31 à la Revue Archéologique de Narbonnaise, 390 p.
- Leveau Ph. et Rémy B., La ville des Alpes occidentales à l’époque romaine, CHRIPA, Grenoble, 2008.
