= Lycée Louis-Barthou =

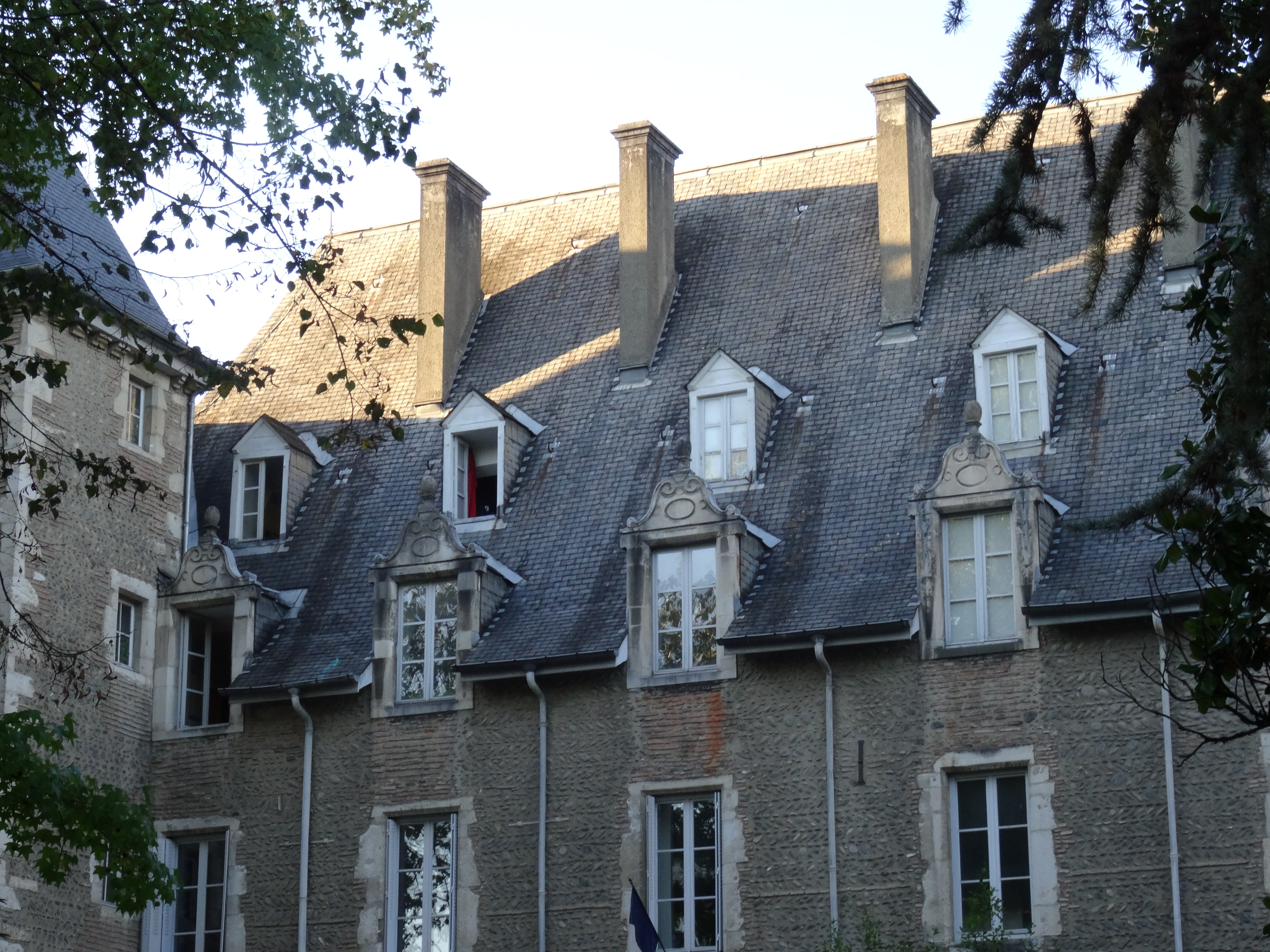

Location
- 2 Rue Louis Barthou, 64000 Pau; Pau, Pyrénées-Atlantiques; France
- Coordinates: 43.2962°N 0.3645°W

Information
- Type: Lycée
- Established: 1640
- Proviseur: Eric Rottier
- Campus type: urban
- Website: https://www.lyceelouisbarthou.fr/

Lycée Louis-Barthou is a secondary school in Pau, Pyrénées-Atlantiques, France.

== History ==
The school's history goes back to a religious establishment founded by Jesuits in 1640. It is named for French politician Louis Barthou.

== Academics ==
The school offers classes at the Seconde, Première (scientifique, littéraire, économique et social) SMTG, and Terminale level as well as Classes Préparatoires aux Grandes Ecoles.

== Notable alumni ==
=== Academia ===
- Pierre Bourdieu (1930, in Denguin -2002) - sociologist
- Guy Debord (1931 – 1994) - Marxist theorist, philosopher, filmmaker, critic of work
- Louis Favoreu (1936 – 2004) - academic, specialized in public law, and a jurist
- Philippe Leveau (born 1940 in Angoulême) - historian and archaeologist

=== Arts ===
- Comte de Lautréamont (1846-1870) - poet
- Titouan Lamazou (born 1955 in Casablanca) - navigator, artist and writer
- Saint-John Perse (1887-1975) - poet-diplomat, awarded the Nobel Prize in Literature in 1960 "for the soaring flight and evocative imagery of his poetry."
- Joseph Peyré (1892-1968) - writer
- Frederick Cayley Robinson (1862 – 1927) - English artist

=== Media and entertainment ===
- Daniel Balavoine (1952-1986) - singer-songwriter
- Nathalie Cardone (born 1967) - actress and singer
- Isabelle Ithurburu (born 1983) - sports journalist and television presenter
- Denis Lalanne (1926 – 2019) - sports journalist

=== Politics ===
- Louis Barthou (1862-1934) - politician; Prime Minister of France
- Henri Emmanuelli (1945-2017) - politician SP
- Éric Piolle (born 1973) - engineer and politician (EELV)
- Boris Vallaud (born 1975) - politician (SP)

=== Sports ===
- Édouard Cissé (born 1978) - soccer player
- Tony Estanguet (born 1978) - canoeist, Olympic champion
- Franck Lestage (born 1968) - athlete
- Robert Paparemborde (1948-2001) - rugby player

=== Other ===
- Léopold Eyharts (born 1957) - astronaut

== See also ==
- List of Jesuit sites
