= René Rouquet =

French politician

René Rouquet (born 15 February 1946) is a French politician who served as member of the National Assembly of France. He represented the Val-de-Marne department, and is a member of the Socialiste, radical, citoyen et divers gauche.

In parliament, Rouquet served on the Committee on Foreign Affairs. He was also the president of the French-Armenian Parliamentary Friendship Group and a member of the parliamentary friendship groups with Albania, Iraq, Lebanon, Slovenia, Somalia, Ukraine, and Zimbabwe.

In addition to his role in parliament, Rouquet served as member of the French delegation to the Parliamentary Assembly of the Council of Europe from 2010. As member of the Socialist Group, he most recently was a member of the Committee on Political Affairs and Democracy and a member of the Committee on the Honouring of Obligations and Commitments by Member States of the Council of Europe (Monitoring Committee). He was a member of cross-party delegations to observe the 2013 repeat parliamentary elections in Ukraine; the 2016 parliamentary elections in Serbia; and the 2016 parliamentary elections in Jordan. In January 2017, he was elected as one of 17 vice-presidents of the Assembly, under the leadership of Pedro Agramunt.

In June 2016, Rouquet announced that he would not stand in the 2017 legislative elections but instead resign from active politics by the end of the parliamentary term.
