= Rachid Nekkaz =

Algerian businessman and political activist (born 1972)

- رشيد نكاز
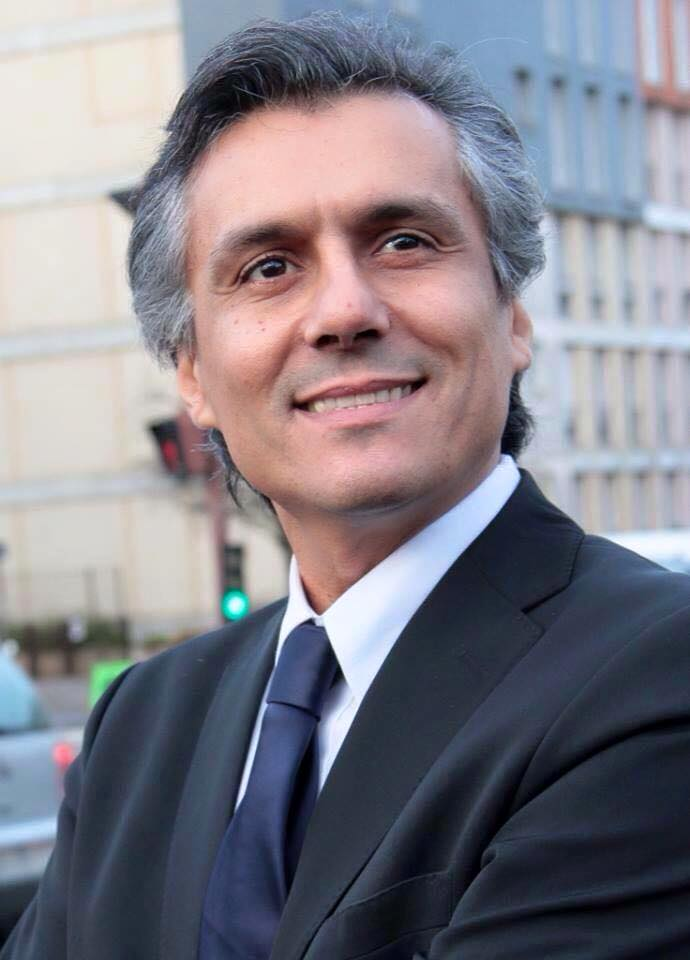
- Nekkaz in 2014
- Born: 9 January 1972 (age 54); Villeneuve-Saint-Georges, France
- Education: University of Paris
- Occupations: Businessman, political activist

Rachid Nekkaz (Arabic: رشيد نكاز; born 9 January 1972) is an Algerian businessman and political activist.

== Early life ==
Rachid Nekkaz was born on 9 January 1972 in Villeneuve-Saint-Georges, France. His parents were Algerian immigrants. He graduated from the University of Paris, where he received a Bachelor of Arts degree in the history of philosophy.

== Career ==
Nekkaz first came into the public eye as a potential candidate for the 2007 French presidential election. He caught media attention by purchasing the sponsorship of André Garrec, Mayor of Noron-la-Poterie, who had offered his support for auction, and tearing it up in front of the cameras. However, he failed to secure the 500 endorsements required. In the legislative elections of the same year, he founded his own party, standing in the 7th district of Seine-Saint-Denis and receiving only 156 votes, just over 0.5% of the ballot. He subsequently stood unsuccessfully in the 2008 municipal elections.

In 2010, Nekkaz founded the organisation "Touche pas à ma constitution" (English: "Don’t touch my constitution", a play on the slogan of the NGO SOS Racisme: Touche pas à mon pote), which pledged to pay the fine of any women convicted of wearing the burqa in public. He announced that he was committing 1 million euro to this campaign. He travelled to Brussels in August 2011 to pay the fines of two women convicted for the same offence.

Suspected of trying to buy at least one sponsorship for the presidential election he was indicted for active corruption in March 2012. On 5 December 2013, the Paris Criminal Court sentenced him to 18 months in prison, suspended, and the mayor of Mertzen was fined €2,000 for passive corruption.

In October 2013, Nekkaz renounced his French citizenship to run for the 2014 Algerian presidential election. By birth he previously held dual citizenship, but Algerian law requires the president to hold only Algerian citizenship.

In August 2018, he traveled to Denmark to pay the fines of women who had breached the laws on face-covering clothing. In response, political parties Danish People's Party and Venstre proposed to change the law from a simply a fine to also include 7 days in jail for repeat offenders. In September 2018, he appeared outside the parliament of Denmark to reimburse the money to any individuals who had been fined under Denmark's burka ban. He was dressed with an Algerian and a Danish flag around his neck and held a picture showing Danish politician Lars Løkke Rasmussen and mujahideen in his hand. At the scene media and police were present, but nobody showed up to have the money reimbursed during the hour he held his political speech. In his speech, he stated that Rasmussen had financed terrorists. When he tried to enter the stairs to Christiansborg, he was removed by police.
