= Socialists (parliamentary group) =

Social democratic parliamentary group in France

Socialists Socialistes
- Chamber: National Assembly
- Legislature(s): Since the 6th of the Third Republic
- Previous name(s): Socialist and affiliated group (2018–2022, 2023–present) Older: Socialist Union (1893–1902); Revolutionary socialist group (1902–1905); Parliamentary socialist group (1902–1905); Unified socialist group (1906–1910); Socialist group (1958–1967, 1969–1973, 1978–2007); Federation of the Democratic and Socialist Left group (1967–1969); Socialist Party and radicals of the left group (1973–1978); Socialist, Radical and Citizen group (2007); Socialist, Radical, Citizen and Miscellaneous group (2007–2012); Socialist, Republican and Citizen group (2012–2016); Socialist, Ecologist and Republican group (2016–2017); New Left group (2017–2018); Socialist and affiliated group (member of the Nupes intergroup) (2022–2023)
- Member parties: Socialist Party; Place Publique; Progressive Democratic Party of Guadeloupe; Euskal Herria Bai
- President: Boris Vallaud
- Constituency: Landes's 3rd
- Representation: 69 / 577
- Ideology: Social democracy Ecologism

The Socialists (French: Socialistes) is a parliamentary group in the National Assembly of France that includes representatives of the Socialist Party (PS).

== History ==
The first socialist parliamentary group emerged in 1893 under the Third Republic, with the socialists remaining present in the Chamber of Deputies through the end of the republic in 1940, resuming within the National Assembly during the brief period of the Fourth Republic.

The first socialist group of the Fifth Republic was formed in the 1st National Assembly on 9 December 1958 with 47 deputies, under the name of the socialist group (groupe socialiste), and was re-formed with 66 seats on 6 December 1962 following legislative elections. On 3 April 1967, the Federation of the Democratic and Socialist Left group (groupe de la Fédération de la gauche démocrate et socialiste) was formed, consisting of 121 deputies. Following the poor performance of the FGDS in the 1968 legislative elections, with the group re-formed on 11 July 1968 including only 57 deputies, and François Mitterrand subsequently resigned on 7 November, followed by Guy Mollet on 22 December, marking the end of the FGDS. The associated FGDS group in the National Assembly, however, survived until its eventual dissolution on 3 October 1969, when the socialist group (groupe socialiste) was formed, with deputies transferring to the new group.

Following the 1973 legislative elections in which the Socialist Party (PS) competed for the first time, a parliamentary group was formed with the radicals of the MRG (now known as the PRG) with the name Socialist Party and radicals of the left group (groupe du Parti socialiste et des radicaux de gauche) on 2 April, with 102 deputies in total. In subsequent years, the group was simply re-formed as the socialist group (groupe socialiste), starting on 3 April 1978 with 113 seats following legislative elections, on 2 July 1981 with 285 seats following legislative elections, on 1 April 1986 with 212 seats following legislative elections, on 16 July 1988 with 275 seats following legislative elections, on 2 April 1993 with 57 seats following legislative elections, on 12 June 1997 with 250 seats following legislative elections, and on 25 June 2002 with 141 seats following legislative elections. The group was reconstituted under a new name following the 2007 legislative elections; including 204 deputies, with 186 members and 18 related, it took the name of the Socialist, Radical and Citizen group (groupe socialiste, radical et citoyen), abbreviated as SRC; on 11 July 2007, it was renamed again to become the Socialist, Radical, Citizen and Miscellaneous Left group (groupe socialiste, radical, citoyen et divers gauche).

The name was again changed following the 2012 legislative elections; initially named the Socialist, Republican and Citizen group (groupe socialiste, républicain et citoyen) on 26 June, the name was subsequently changed to the Socialist, Ecologist and Republican group (groupe socialiste, écologiste et républicain) on 24 May 2016, after the departure of six "reformist" deputies from the ecologist group to join the socialist group amid the Denis Baupin affair and a split within Europe Ecology – The Greens (EELV) over support for Hollande's government left it with too few deputies to constitute a parliamentary group.

In the 2017 legislative elections, the Socialists suffered a historically poor performance, securing only 30 seats in the National Assembly. Despite being few in number, divisions within the group over support for the new government persisted, with a number sympathetic to the ideas of president Emmanuel Macron. The most recent president of the group, Olivier Faure, was re-elected on 22 June with 28 votes against Delphine Batho with 3 votes; he subsequently announced on 27 June that the name of the socialist group would change to the "New Left group" (groupe Nouvelle Gauche). At the time of its formation on 27 June, the parliamentary group included 31 deputies, including 3 associated members.

The group was reduced by one member after the election of Joël Aviragnet was annulled, forcing a by-election, by the Constitutional Council on 18 December 2017. After Faure was elected as First Secretary of the French Socialist Party, he was succeeded by Valérie Rabault on 11 April 2018, who secured 21 votes against 7 for Guillaume Garot following the withdrawal of Boris Vallaud that morning.

== List of presidents ==
Portrait	Name	Term start	Term end	Notes
	Francis Leenhardt	9 December 1958	9 October 1962	
	Gaston Defferre	7 December 1962	22 May 1981	
	Pierre Joxe	30 June 1981	19 July 1984	
	André Billardon	24 July 1984	27 March 1986	
	Pierre Joxe	27 March 1986	14 May 1988	
	Louis Mermaz	21 June 1988	2 October 1990	
	Jean Auroux	10 October 1990	1 April 1993	
	Martin Malvy	1 April 1993	1 October 1995	
	Laurent Fabius	3 October 1995	21 April 1997	
	Jean-Marc Ayrault	5 June 1997	15 May 2012	
	Bruno Le Roux	21 June 2012	6 December 2016	
	Seybah Dagoma	6 December 2016	12 December 2016	
	Olivier Faure	13 December 2016	11 April 2018	
	Valérie Rabault	11 April 2018	28 June 2022	
	Boris Vallaud	28 June 2022	present	

== Historical membership ==
Year	Seats	Change	Notes
1958	47 / 579	Steady	
1962	66 / 482	▲19	
1967	121 / 487	▲55	
1968	57 / 487	▼64	
1973	102 / 490	▲45	
1978	113 / 491	▲11	
1981	285 / 491	▲172	
1986	212 / 577	▼73	
1988	275 / 577	▲63	
1993	57 / 577	▼218	
1997	250 / 577	▲193	
2002	141 / 577	▼109	
2007	204 / 577	▲63	
2012	295 / 577	▲91	
2017	31 / 577	▼264	
2022	31 / 577	Steady	
2024	66 / 577	▲35	

== See also ==
- Socialist and Republican group
