= Henri Emmanuelli =

French politician (1945–2017)

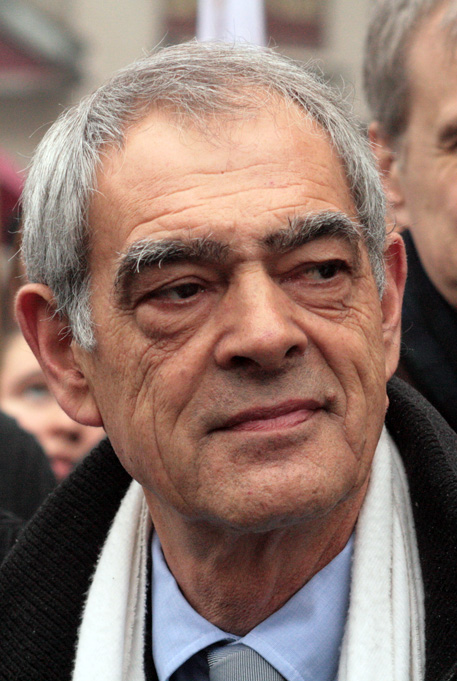
- Emmanuelli in 2007

President of the National Assembly
- In office 22 January 1992 – 1 April 1993
- Preceded by: Laurent Fabius
- Succeeded by: Philippe Séguin

First Secretary of the Socialist Party
- In office 19 June 1994 – 14 October 1995
- Preceded by: Michel Rocard
- Succeeded by: Lionel Jospin

Secretary of State for the Budget and Consommation
- In office 22 March 1983 – 20 March 1986
- Prime Minister: Pierre Mauroy
- Preceded by: Laurent Fabius
- Succeeded by: Alain Juppé

Secretary of State for Overseas France
- In office 22 May 1981 – 22 May 1983
- Prime Minister: Pierre Mauroy
- Preceded by: Paul Dijoud
- Succeeded by: Georges Lemoine
Elective offices in Landes
Member of the National Assembly for Landes
In office 7 February 2000 – 21 March 2017
Preceded by	Joël Goyheneix
Succeeded by	Monique Lubin
Constituency	3rd
In office 23 June 1988 – 17 December 1997
Preceded by	Proportional representation
Succeeded by	Joël Goyheneix
Constituency	3rd
In office 2 April 1986 – 14 May 1988
Constituency	At-large
In office 3 April 1978 – 23 July 1981
Preceded by	Jean-Marie Commenay
Succeeded by	Robert Cabé
Constituency	3rd
President of the Departmental Council of Landes
In office 7 February 2000 – 21 March 2017
Preceded by	Robert Cabé
Succeeded by	Xavier Fortinon
In office 22 March 1982 – 1 December 1997
Preceded by	Henri Scognamiglio
Succeeded by	Robert Cabé

Personal details
- Born: 31 May 1945 Eaux-Bonnes, France
- Died: 21 March 2017 (aged 71) Bayonne, France
- Resting place: Laurède
- Party: Socialist Party (1971–2017)
- Education: Sciences Po
- Profession: Banker

Henri Emmanuelli (French: [ɑ̃ʁi ɑ̃manɥeli]; 31 May 1945 – 21 March 2017) was a French politician. A member of the Socialist Party (PS), he was a deputy for Landes from 1978 to 1981, from 1986 to 1997 and again from 2000 to 2017. He served as President of the National Assembly from 1992 to 1993 and First Secretary of the Socialist Party from 1994 to 1995.

== Early life and career ==
Emmanuelli was born in Eaux-Bonnes in the French department of Pyrénées-Atlantiques. He grew up with a working-class background and lost his father at a very young age. He studied at Lycée Louis-Barthou in Pau, Pyrénées-Atlantiques and then in Sciences Po in Paris.

In 1969, he joined the Compagnie Financière Edmond de Rothschild. In 1971, he was appointed to the management of this company, becoming a senior banking executive and then a co-director in 1975. He continued his professional career at the Rothschild Bank until he was elected to the National Assembly at age 32 in 1978.

== Political career ==
Emmanuelli joined the Socialist Party in 1971. On the request of François Mitterrand he was, at the age of 27, a candidate in the 1978 legislative election in the 2nd constituency of Lot-et-Garonne. But it was on 19 March 1978 that he was elected for the first time as the deputy for the 3rd constituency of Landes, which moved the district to the left wing. In 1982, he was elected for the first time as the President of the General Council of Landes. Between 1981 and 1986, he served in the governments of Pierre Mauroy and Laurent Fabius as Secretary of State tasked with the DOM-TOM territories of France (1981–1983), Secretary of State for the Budget (1983–1986) as well as Secretary of State for Consumption (1984–1986).

Between January 1992 and April 1993, he was President of the National Assembly. He was then elected First Secretary of the Socialist Party in June 1994 and held this office until October 1995. His election to this position was seen as "revenge" for the Mitterrand wing of the Socialist Party against Michel Rocard, the incumbent First Secretary, who had been weakened by the party's poor result in the 1994 European Parliament election. However, he was defeated by Lionel Jospin in the race to represent the Socialist Party in the 1995 presidential election. Jospin also took on the role of First Secretary in October 1995. One year later, Emmanuelli was convicted for the illicit financing of the party when he was its treasurer. He re-entered politics in 2000.

Whilst he was a faithful supporter of Mitterrand until the latter's death, he is identified as belonging to the left wing of the Socialist Party, and was one of the leaders of the party's "New World" faction formed in 2002 that aimed to steer the party leftwards after Jospin's poor performance in that year's presidential election. In the campaigns for the referendum on the European Constitution in 2005 and the Treaty of Rome of 2004, he publicly declared himself in favour of the "no" campaign; this put him in direct opposition to the official line of the Socialist Party, which was in favour of the treaty. He believed that the treaty was a move away from the idea of a federal Europe, which he endorsed, notably in his "Plea for Europe". He was followed by his close supporters, one of which was Michel Vergnier, a deputy for Creuse. In 2000, he took part in the Congress of Grenoble of the Socialist Party and was an avid campaigner for a Socialist Party that was aligned to the left. For the Congress of Le Mans in November 2005, he associated himself with the New Socialist Party motion of Arnaud Montebourg, Vincent Peillon and Benoît Hamon.

== Other activities ==
- Caisse des dépôts et consignations, Chair of the Supervisory Board (2012–2017)

== Death ==
Emmanuelli died on 21 March 2017 at a medical centre in Bayonne, Pyrénées-Atlantiques from complications of acute bronchitis at the age of 71.

== Political positions ==
Governmental functions

- Secretary of State for Overseas Territories: 1981–1983
- Secretary of State for the Budget and Consommation: 1983–1986

Electoral mandates

National Assembly of France

- President of the National Assembly of France: 1992–1993
- Member of the National Assembly of France for Landes (3rd constituency): 1978–1981 (became Secretary of State in 1981) / 1986–1997 (sentenced to prison in 1997) / 2000–2017. Elected in 1978, reelected in 1981, 1986, 1988, 1993, 1997, 2000, 2002, 2007, 2012.

Regional Council

- Regional councillor of Aquitaine: 1986–1988 (resignation).

General Council

- President of the General Council of Landes: 1982–1997 (sentenced to prison in 1997) / 2000–2015. Reelected in 1985, 1988, 1992, 1994, 2001, 2004, 2008, 2011. President of the Departmental Council: 2015–2017. Elected in 2015.
- General councillor of Landes, elected in the canton of Tartas-Ouest, then from 1994 in the canton of Mugron: 1982–1997 (sentenced to prison in 1997) / 2000–2015. Reelected in 1988, 1994, 2000, 2001, 2008. Departmental councillor: 2015–2017. Elected in 2015 in the canton of Coteau de Chalosse.

Political function

- First Secretary (leader) of the Socialist Party: 1994–1995, elected in 1994.

== Publications ==
- Plaidoyer pour l’Europe, Éditions Flammarion, July 1992. (A Plea for Europe)
- Citadelles interdites, Éditions Ramsay, 2000 (roman). (Forbidden Citadels)

Political offices
Preceded by Laurent Fabius	President of the National Assembly; 1992–1993	Succeeded by Philippe Séguin
Party political offices
Preceded by Michel Rocard	First Secretary of the Socialist Party; 1994–1995	Succeeded by Lionel Jospin
