= Grenoble Congress =

The Grenoble Congress was the fourth national congress of the French Socialist Party (Parti socialiste or PS). It took place from 22 to 24 June 1973.

== Results ==
Popular vote
Mitterrand-Defferre-Mauroy	65.35%
CÉRÉS	21.02%
Mollétists	8%
Jean Poperen	5%

François Mitterrand was re-elected as First Secretary.
