= Landes's 3rd constituency =

Constituency of the National Assembly of France

3rd constituency of Landes
- inline Constituency of the National Assembly of France

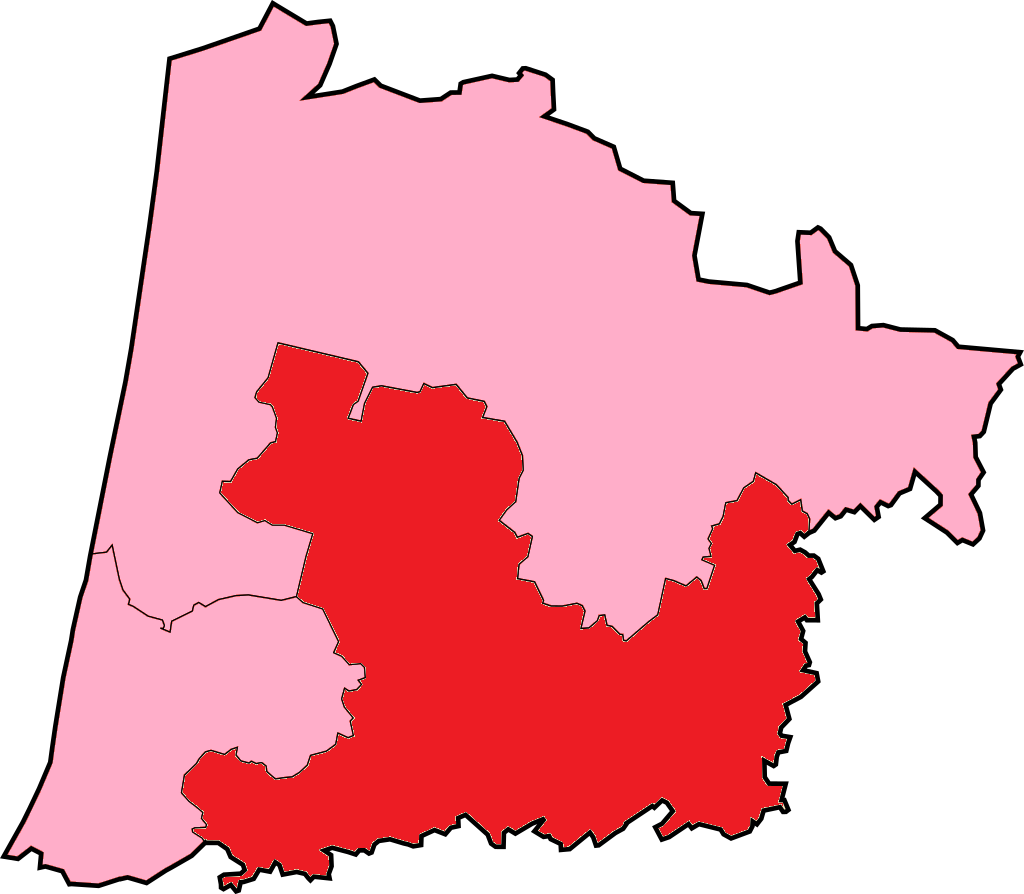
- Landes's 3rd Constituency shown within Landes
- Deputy: Boris Vallaud; PS
- Department: Landes
- Cantons: (pre-2015) Aire-sur-l'Adour, Amou, Geaune, Grenade-sur-l'Adour, Hagetmau, Montfort-en-Chalosse, Mugron, Peyrehorade, Pouillon, Saint-Sever, Tartas-Est, Tartas-Ouest, Villeneuve-de-Marsan
- Registered voters: 96524

The 3rd constituency of the Landes (French: Troisième circonscription des Landes) is a French legislative constituency in the Landes département. Like the other 576 French constituencies, it elects one MP using the two-round system, with a run-off if no candidate receives over 50% of the vote in the first round.

== Description ==
The 3rd constituency of the Landes lies in the south east of the department. The seat does not contain a major urban centre. Since 1978 the voters of this constituency have consistently returned Socialist Party deputies most notably former Government Minister, President of the National Assembly and First Secretary of the Socialist Party Henri Emmanuelli.

== Assembly Members ==
Election	Member	Party
1958	Jean-Marie Commenay	Independent, app. MRP
1962	Jean-Marie Commenay	Independent, app. CD
1967	Jean-Marie Commenay	Independent, app. PDM
1968	Jean-Marie Commenay	Independent, app. CDP
1973	Jean-Marie Commenay	Independent, app. CDS
1978	Henri Emmanuelli	PS
1981	Robert Cabé (Note: Substitute for Henri Emmanuelli, who was appointed to government)	PS
1986	Proportional representation – no election by constituency	
1988	Henri Emmanuelli	PS
1993	Henri Emmanuelli	PS
1997	Henri Emmanuelli	PS
2002	Henri Emmanuelli	PS
2007	Henri Emmanuelli	PS
2012	Henri Emmanuelli	PS
2017	Monique Lubin (Note: Substitute for Henri Emmanuelli, replaced him from 29 March 2017, after his death on 21 March 2017)	PS
2017	Boris Vallaud	PS
2022	Boris Vallaud	PS
2024	Boris Vallaud	PS

== Election results ==
=== 2024 ===
Candidate	Party	Alliance	First round			Second round		
Candidate	Party	Alliance	Votes	%	+/–	Votes	%	+/–
Boris Vallaud	PS	NFP	26,235	37.10	-3.06	38,537	56.65	-3.28
Sylvie Franceschini	RN		25,165	35.59	+16.81	29,491	43.35	new
Tom Gillet Duffrechou	MoDEM	Ensemble	11,310	16.00	-8.86	withdrew		
Brice Saint-Cricq	LR	UDC	5,078	7.18	+1.99			
Christelle Lassort	RES!		1,141	1.61	-3.26			
Christian Delfosse	REC		813	1.15	-2.09			
Carole Voutaz	LO		513	0.73	-0.19			
Matèu Richard	PO		451	0.64	-0.54			
Votes			70,706	100.00		68,028	100.00	
Valid votes			70,706	96.64	-0.52	68,028	92.36	+1.01
Blank votes			1,583	2.16	+0.18	4,030	5.47	-0.12
Null votes			877	1.20	+0.34	1,595	2.17	-0.89
Turnout			73,166	73.15	+16.31	73,653	73.63	+20.39
Abstentions			26,854	26.85	-16.31	26,382	26.37	-20.39
Registered voters			100,020			100,035		
Result			PS HOLD					

=== 2022 ===
Legislative Election 2022: Landes's 3rd constituency
Party	Candidate	Votes	%	±%
PS (NUPÉS)	Boris Vallaud	22,057	40.16	-2.01
LREM (Ensemble)	Jean-Francois Broqueres	13,656	24.86	-9.29
RN	Sylvie Franceschini	10,317	18.78	+8.53
LC (UDC)	Marion Berginiat	2,849	5.19	−1.61
R!	Christelle Lassort	2,675	4.87	N/A
REC	Isabelle Du Breuil Helion De La Gueronniere	1,780	3.24	N/A
Others	N/A	1,591	2.90	
Turnout		54,925	56.84	−0.90
2nd round result
PS (NUPÉS)	Boris Vallaud	28,998	59.93	+9.18
LREM (Ensemble)	Jean-Francois Broqueres	19,389	40.07	−9.18
Turnout		48,387	53.24	+0.02
PS hold				

=== 2017 ===
Candidate	Label	First round		Second round	
Candidate	Label	Votes	%	Votes	%
Jean-Pierre Steiner	REM	18,383	34.15	22,769	49.25
Boris Vallaud	PS	13,636	25.33	23,460	50.75
Philippe Dubourg	FI	6,225	11.57		
Océane Ravix	FN	5,518	10.25		
Marie-Claire Duprat	UDI	3,662	6.80		
Michèle Berthou	PCF	1,718	3.19		
Richard Bidegaray	ECO	1,119	2.08		
Nicole de Letter	DLF	915	1.70		
Christelle Lassort	DVD	693	1.29		
Yann Brongniart	DVD	653	1.21		
Marie Radosz	DIV	629	1.17		
Laëtitia Hirsch	ECO	378	0.70		
Nicolas Vion	EXG	296	0.55		
Votes		53,825	100.00	46,229	100.00
Valid votes		53,825	96.57	46,229	90.00
Blank votes		1,300	2.33	3,340	6.50
Null votes		611	1.10	1,798	3.50
Turnout		55,736	57.74	51,367	53.22
Abstentions		40,788	42.26	45,144	46.78
Registered voters		96,524		96,511	
Source: Ministry of the Interior

=== 2012 ===
2012 legislative election in Landes's 3rd constituency
Candidate	Party	First round	
Candidate	Party	Votes	%
Henri Emmanuelli	PS	33,603	56.07%
Maria-Filoména Labaste	UMP	12,803	21.36%
Julien Antunes	FN	5,538	9.24%
Isabelle Figueres	FG	4,044	6.75%
Henry-Louis Picquet	MoDem	1,839	3.07%
Bernadette Campagne-Ibarcq	EELV	1,328	2.22%
Edith Dreistadt	AEI	331	0.55%
Marc Isidori	LO	254	0.42%
Corinne Morant	??	195	0.33%
Valid votes		59,935	97.77%
Spoilt and null votes		1,365	2.23%
Votes cast / turnout		61,300	64.80%
Abstentions		33,294	35.20%
Registered voters		94,594	100.00%
