= Seine-et-Marne's 11th constituency =

Constituency of the National Assembly of France

11th constituency of Seine-et-Marne
- inline Constituency of the National Assembly of France

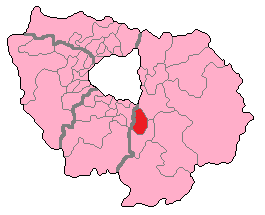
- Seine-et-Marne's 11th Constituency shown within Île-de-France
- Deputy: Olivier Faure; PS
- Department: Seine-et-Marne
- Cantons: Combs-la-Ville (part) – Le Mée-sur-Seine – Savigny-le-Temple
- Registered voters: 62,580

The 11th constituency of Seine-et-Marne is a French legislative constituency in the Seine-et-Marne département.

== Description ==
The 11th constituency of Seine-et-Marne was created as a result of the 2010 redistricting of French legislative constituencies in which Seine-et-Marne gained two additional constituencies. The seat is a combination of territory from the old 1st and 9th constituencies.

== Historic representation ==
Deputies from the 11th constituency of Seine-et-Marne elected to the National Assembly for the legislatures of the 5th Republic.
Legislature	Start of mandate	End of mandate	Deputy	Party	Notes
14th	20 June 2012	20 June 2017	Olivier Faure	PS	
15th	21 June 2017	21 June 2022	Olivier Faure	PS	
16th	22 June 2022	9 June 2024	Olivier Faure	PS	
17th	30 June 2024	present	Olivier Faure	PS	

== Election results ==
=== 2024 ===
Legislative Election 2024: Seine-et-Marne's 11th constituency
Party	Candidate	Votes	%	±%
PS (NFP)	Olivier Faure	21,643	53.42	+6.52
LR (UXD)	Vincent Paul-Petit	11,902	29.38	N/A
UDI (Ensemble)	Thomas Ianz	5,797	14.31	N/A
LO	Anne De La Torre	868	2.14	N/A
DIV	Flore Creantor	171	0.42	N/A
DIV	Dominique Mahé	132	0.33	N/A
Turnout		42,159	63.02	+22.47
PS hold				

=== 2022 ===
Legislative Election 2022: Seine-et-Marne's 11th constituency
Party	Candidate	Votes	%	±%
PS (NUPÉS)	Olivier Faure	12,279	46.90	+5.17
LREM (Ensemble)	Charlyne Peculier	5,768	22.03	-8.36
RN	Martine Demonchy	4,589	17.53	+4.17
UDI (UDC)	Joël Sangare	1,256	4.80	−3.54
REC	Brigitte Lapeyronie	919	3.51	N/A
PA	Sylvie Morel-Lelu	555	2.12	N/A
Others	N/A	815	3.11	
Turnout		26,181	40.55	−0.41
2nd round result
PS (NUPÉS)	Olivier Faure	15,453	64.65	+3.56
LREM (Ensemble)	Charlyne Peculier	8,522	35.55	−3.56
Turnout		23,975	38.70	+4.30
PS hold				

=== 2017 ===
Legislative Election 2017: Seine-et-Marne's 11th constituency
Party	Candidate	Votes	%	±%
LREM	Amandine Rubinelli	8,078	30.39	
PS	Olivier Faure	7,274	27.37	
LFI	Daniel Allioux	3,818	14.36	
FN	Jean-Marie Launay	3,550	13.36	
LR	Natacha Bedhiaf	2,216	8.34	
DLF	Evelyne Marque Gras	626	2.36	
Others	N/A	1,019		
Turnout		26,581	40.96	
2nd round result
PS	Olivier Faure	13,639	61.09	
LREM	Amandine Rubinelli	8,686	38.91	
Turnout		22,325	34.40	
PS hold				

=== 2012 ===
Legislative Election 2012: Seine-et-Marne's 11th Constituency 2nd round
Party	Candidate	Votes	%	±%
PS	Olivier Faure	18,740	63.22	
UMP	Cathy Bissonnier	10,903	36.78	
Turnout		30,691	49.04	

== Sources ==
Official results of French elections from 2002: "Résultats électoraux officiels en France" (in French).
