= First Secretary of the Socialist Party =

- Premier secrétaire du Parti socialiste
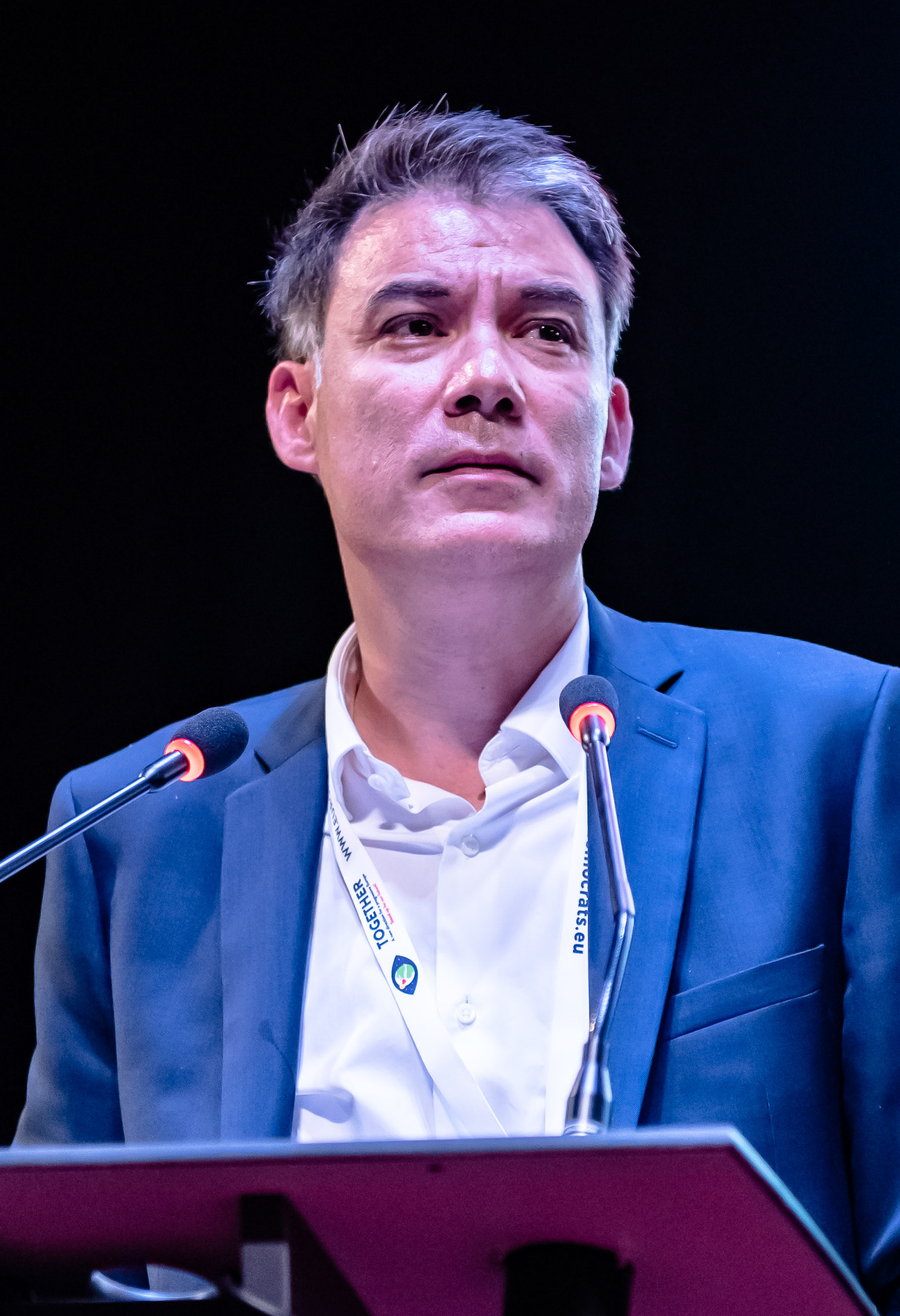
- Incumbent; Olivier Faure since 7 April 2018
- Inaugural holder: Alain Savary
- Formation: 17 July 1969; 57 years ago
- Website: www.parti-socialiste.fr/le_1er_secr_taire

The First Secretary of the Socialist Party (French: Premier secrétaire du Parti socialiste) is the most senior politician within the Socialist Party in France. The office has been held by Olivier Faure since 7 April 2018.

== List of officeholders ==
Name		Years		Notes
1st	Alain Savary	17 July 1969	16 June 1971	
2nd	François Mitterrand	16 June 1971	24 January 1981	Elected President of France in the 1981 election.
3rd	Lionel Jospin	24 January 1981	14 May 1988	First term as First Secretary.
4th	Pierre Mauroy	14 May 1988	9 January 1992	Mauroy was Prime Minister of France from 1981 to 1984.
5th	Laurent Fabius	9 January 1992	3 April 1993	The party leadership collectively resigned on 3 April 1993, following the Socialist defeat in the 1993 legislative election. Fabius was also Prime Minister of France from 1984 to 1986.
6th	Michel Rocard	24 October 1993	19 June 1994	Rocard was Prime Minister of France from 1988 to 1991.
7th	Henri Emmanuelli	19 June 1994	14 October 1995	
8th	Lionel Jospin	14 October 1995	27 November 1997	Second term, interrupted by his appointment as Prime Minister of France.
9th	François Hollande	27 November 1997	26 November 2008	Longest-serving First Secretary. Elected President of France in the 2012 presidential election.
10th	Martine Aubry	26 November 2008	12 September 2012	First woman to hold the office.
11th	Harlem Désir	12 September 2012	15 April 2014	
12th	Jean-Christophe Cambadélis	15 April 2014	30 September 2017	Resigned in the wake of the party's defeat in the 2017 legislative election.
–	Rachid Temal	30 September 2017	7 April 2018	Served an interim tenure.
13th	Olivier Faure	7 April 2018	Incumbent	Elected by acclamation on 29 March 2018, following the withdrawal of Stéphane Le Foll.
