= Rachid Temal =

French politician (born 1973)

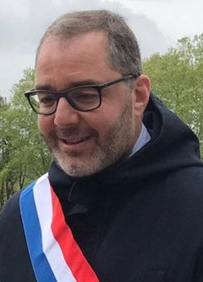
- Temal in 2019

Member of the Senate
- Incumbent
- Assumed office 2 October 2017
- Constituency: Val-d'Oise

Personal details
- Born: 29 March 1973 (age 53)
- Party: Socialist Party

Rachid Temal (born 29 March 1973) is a French politician of the Socialist Party serving as a member of the Senate since 2017. From 2017 to 2018, he served as acting First Secretary of the Socialist Party.
