= Arnaud Beltrame =

French Gendarmerie nationale officer who gave his life in the 2018 Trèbes attack

Colonel Arnaud Beltrame
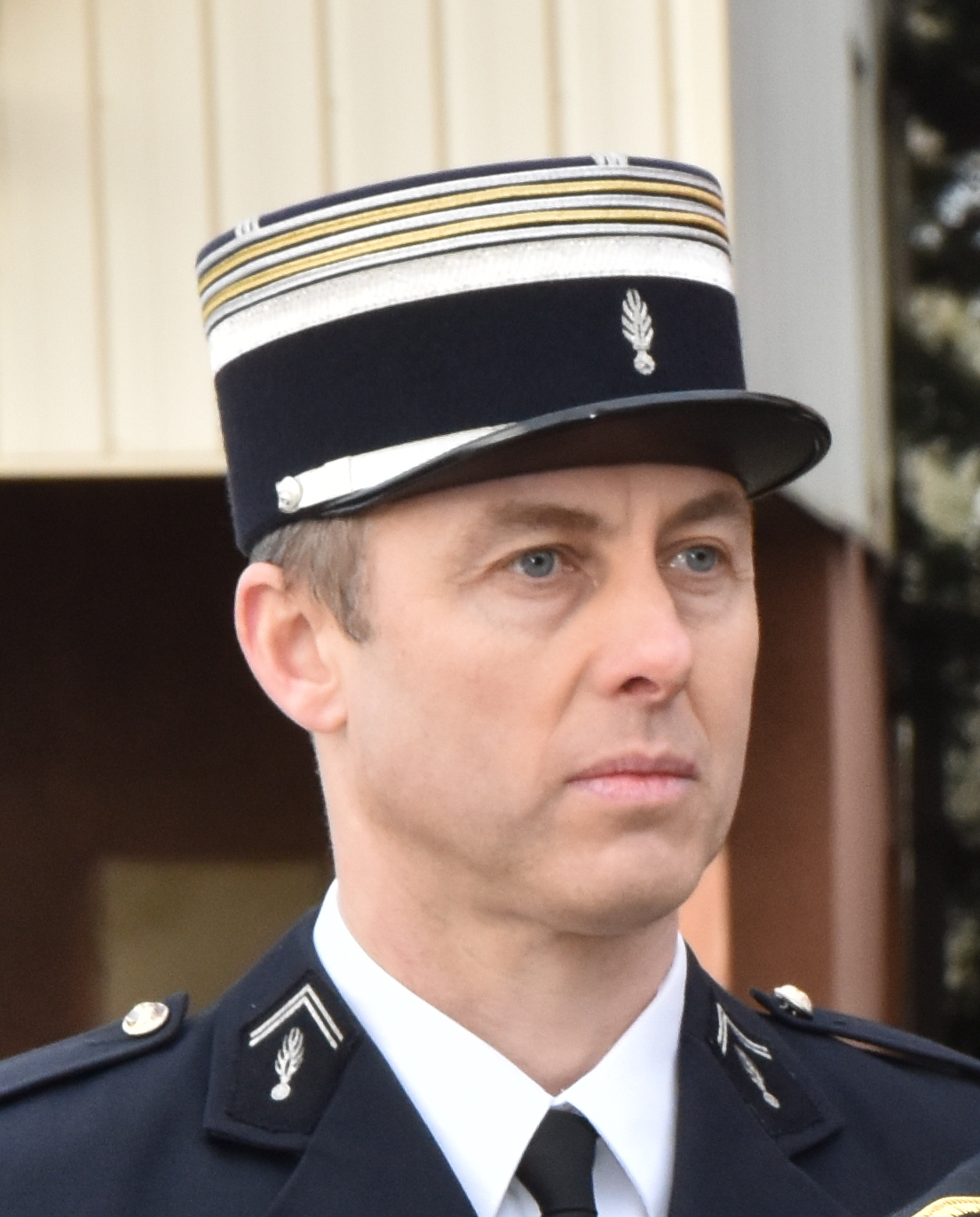
- Born: Arnaud Jean-Georges Beltrame; 18 April 1973; Étampes, France
- Died: 24 March 2018 (aged 44); Carcassonne, France
- Education: Lycée militaire de Saint-Cyr, School of Applied Artillery (1995), École militaire interarmes (1999–2001), École des officiers de la gendarmerie nationale (2001–2002), Institut supérieur du commerce de Paris (2015–2016)
- Occupation: Senior officer of the National Gendarmerie
- Spouse: Marielle Beltrame (m. 2016)
- Military career
- Allegiance: France
- Branch: Gendarmerie nationale
- Service years: 2001–2018
- Rank: Colonel (posthumous)
- Units: EPIGN; Garde républicaine
- Awards: Legion of Honour (Commander)

Arnaud Jean-Georges Beltrame (French pronunciation: [aʁno ʒɑ̃ʒɔʁʒ(ə) bɛltʁam]; 18 April 1973 – 24 March 2018) was a lieutenant colonel in the French Gendarmerie nationale and deputy commander of the Departmental Gendarmerie's Aude unit, who was murdered by an Islamic terrorist at Trèbes after having exchanged himself for a hostage. French President Emmanuel Macron said that Beltrame deserved "the respect and admiration of the whole nation." A state funeral was held at Les Invalides, Paris; for his bravery and adherence to duty he was posthumously promoted to the rank of colonel and made a Commander of the Legion of Honour.

== Early life and education ==
Beltrame was born in 1973 in Étampes, south-southwest of Paris.

Beltrame was a double Major de promotion who graduated at the top of his class in 2001 from the French Army EMIA military academy (École militaire interarmes) and in 2002 from French Gendarmerie nationale Officers School (École des officiers de la gendarmerie nationale).

== Military career ==
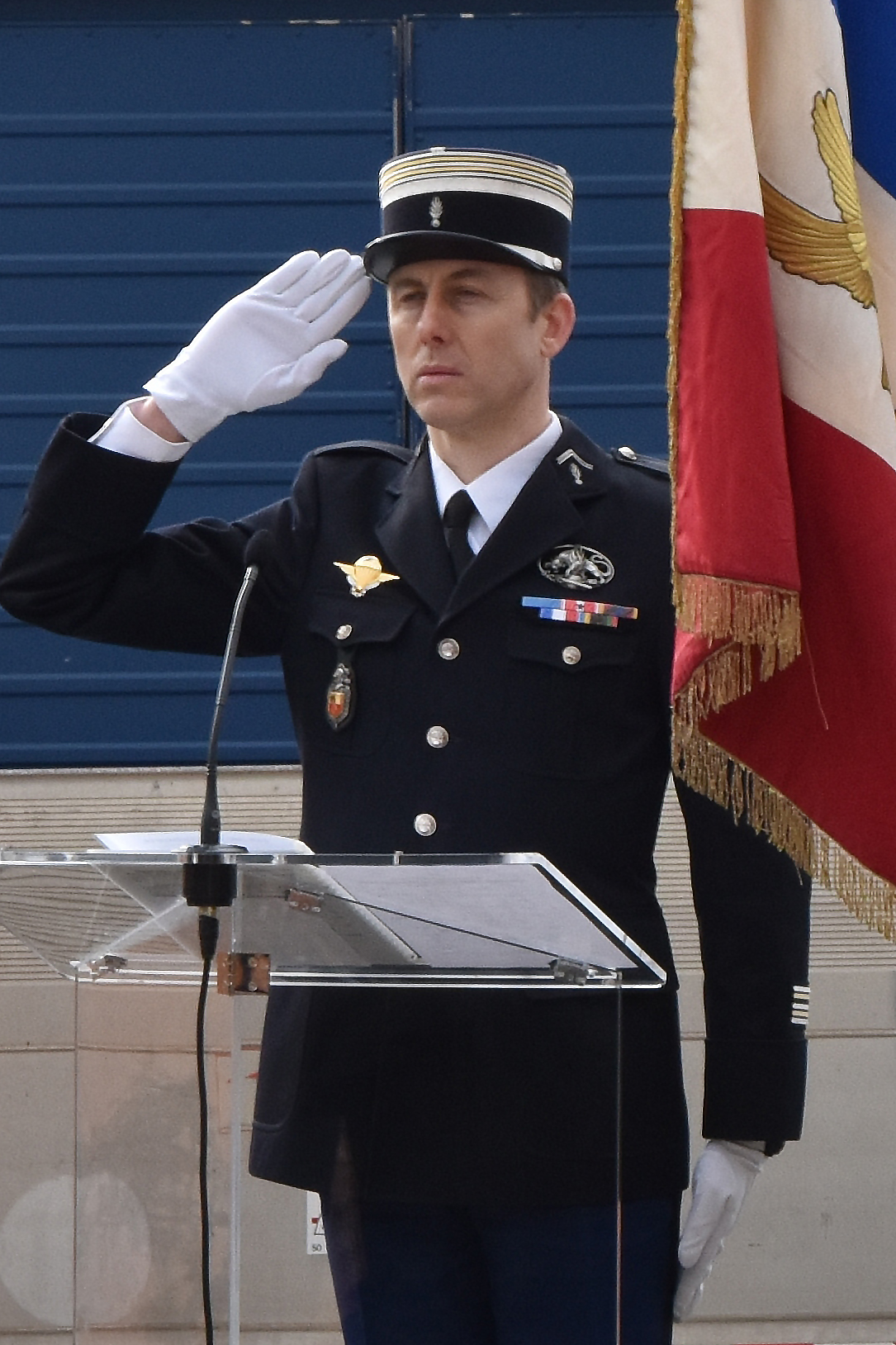
Lieutenant colonel Beltrame during a military ceremony in February 2018

After following a reserve officer course during his military service, Beltrame became a serving reserve artillery officer, assigned first to the 35th Airborne artillery regiment in Tarbes and then the 8th artillery regiment in Commercy. He then transferred to the Gendarmerie and was briefly assigned to the Mobile Gendarmerie armored unit in Satory, near Versailles, before being selected in 2003 for the elite gendarmerie parachute squadron (EPIGN), also based at Satory. He deployed to Iraq in 2005 and received military honors for his service there. He then joined the Republican Guard, part of the national gendarmerie that provides guards of honor and security for the State. He was stationed at the Élysée Palace between 2006 and 2010 and then took command of a Departmental Gendarmerie company in Avranches from 2010 to 2014. After staff service with the Ministry of Ecology and post-graduate training in Business administration and Economy, he joined the Carcassonne Departmental gendarmerie unit in southwestern France in August 2017 as deputy commander.

== Trèbes terrorist attack ==
At about 11 a.m. on 23 March 2018, Redouane Lakdim, a terrorist claiming allegiance to the Islamic State of Iraq and the Levant (ISIS), stormed a supermarket in Trèbes armed with a handgun, a hunting knife, as well as three homemade bombs. He shot two people dead and took others hostage. Police negotiated for the release of the hostages. Beltrame offered to take the place of the final hostage, a female cashier. Beltrame set his mobile phone on a table with its line open so that police outside could monitor activity inside. After a three-hour stand-off, Lakdim stabbed and shot Beltrame. In response, GIGN operatives stormed the supermarket at 2:40 p.m. and killed the assailant. Beltrame died from his injuries at 5 a.m. on 24 March at Carcassonne hospital. According to an autopsy report, Beltrame had sustained four bullet wounds but died from stab wounds to the throat.

== Personal life ==
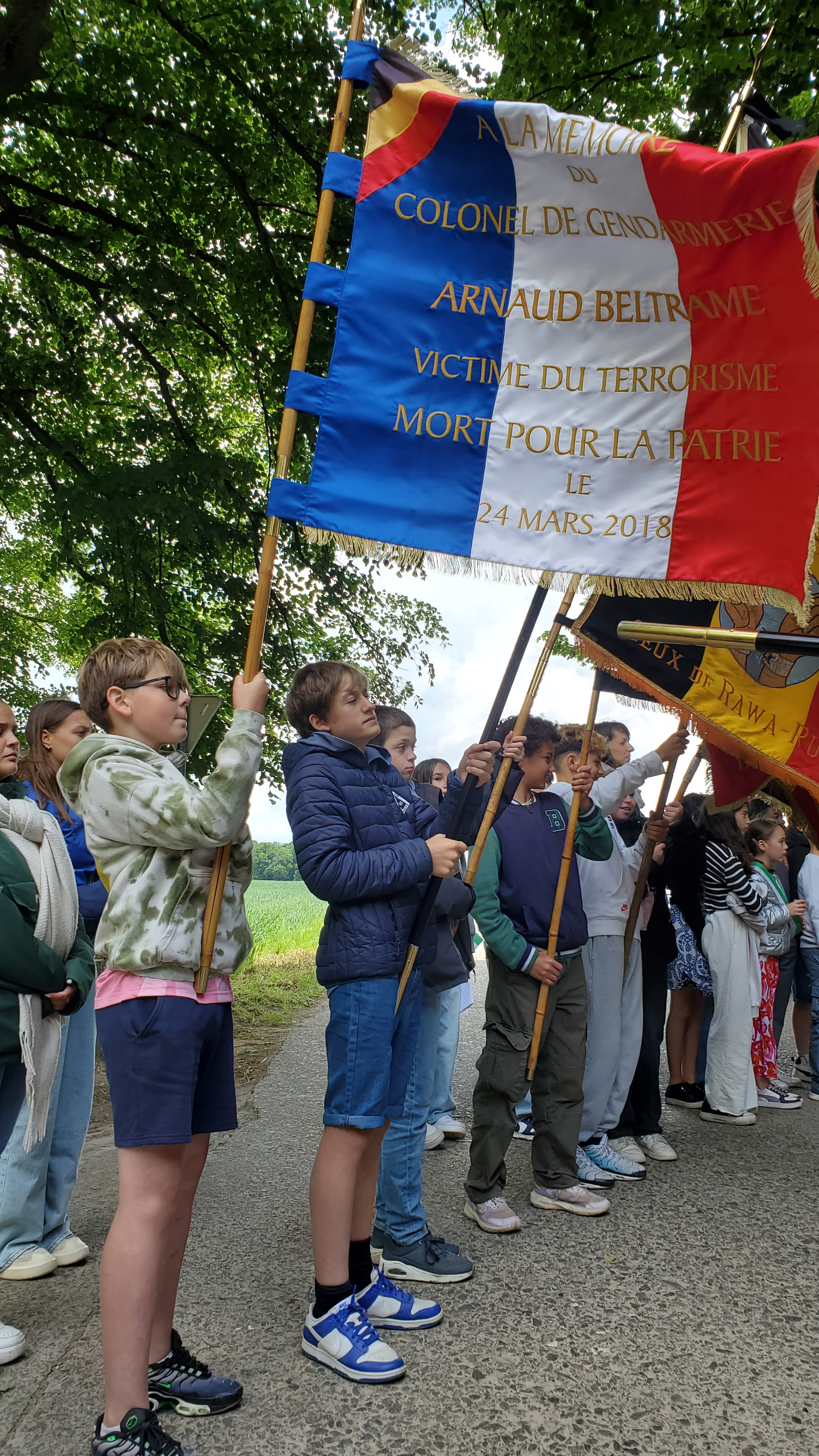
Dedicated French flag during the "Belgo-French Memorial" ceremony in Court-Saint-Etienne (Belgium). May 23rd 2025.

Beltrame was reared in a nonreligious family but, at age 33, he converted to Catholic Christianity, receiving the sacraments of First Communion and Confirmation in 2008 after spending two years as a catechumen. In 2015, he made a pilgrimage to the Basilica of Sainte-Anne d'Auray, "where he asked the Virgin Mary to help him to meet the woman of his life" and shortly afterwards, "he became friends with Marielle, whose faith is deep and discreet." He had married his partner in a civil ceremony in August 2016, but they had planned a church wedding in June 2018 at the Basilica of Saints Nazarius and Celsus. Prior to the terrorist attack at Trèbes, Beltrame made a pilgrimage to Compostela. Beltrame had also been a Freemason and received public honours from his Grand Lodge, but he had distanced himself from the fraternal order during his last years. He had an interest in the history of France and its Christian roots. A week before his death, Beltrame buried his father, who had drowned in the Mediterranean in August 2017 and whose body had been recently recovered in the nets of a fishing boat.

== Homages ==
Minister of the Interior Gérard Collomb and French President Emmanuel Macron spoke of Beltrame's bravery and heroism.

A national tribute was paid to Beltrame at Les Invalides on 27 March 2018 with Macron presiding. French flags and the banners of the Gendarmerie and the National Assembly were lowered to half-staff and many cities announced that streets, squares or buildings would be named in the colonel's honour. There are streets so named in Rosny-sous-Bois, Saint-Fargeau-Ponthierry, Mont-Saint-Aignan, Richwiller, and Provins.

== Honours and awards ==
- Commandeur of the Order of Legion of Honour
- Médaille de la Gendarmerie nationale
- Honour medal for courage and devotion
- Medal for internal security
- Knight of the Ordre National du Mérite
- Cross for Military Valour
- National Defence Medal
- Honour medal of Foreign Affairs

== Military ranks ==
National Gendarmerie

Aspirant (Note: Upon entering the École militaire interarmes)	Sous-lieutenant	Lieutenant	Capitaine	Chef d'escadron	Lieutenant-colonel	Colonel
25 July 1999	1 August 2000	1 August 2001	1 August 2005	1 January 2010	1 August 2016	24 March 2018 Posthumous

== Decorations ==
- Legion of Honour (Commander) – 2018, posthumous
- National Order of Merit (Knight) – 2012
- Cross for Military Valour (bronze star with brigade citation) – 2007
- Médaille de la Gendarmerie nationale – 2018, posthumous
- National Defence Medal (golden) – 2009
- Honour medal for courage and devotion (golden) – 2018, posthumous
- Medal for internal security (golden) – 2018, posthumous
- Honour medal of Foreign Affairs (silver) – 2006
