= AMGN =

AMGN may refer to:

- Académie militaire de la Gendarmerie nationale, in France
- Amgen, an American biopharmaceutical company, NASDAQ symbol AMGN
