= Gaston Ouassénan Koné =

Ivorian general, novelist, and politician (1939–2023)

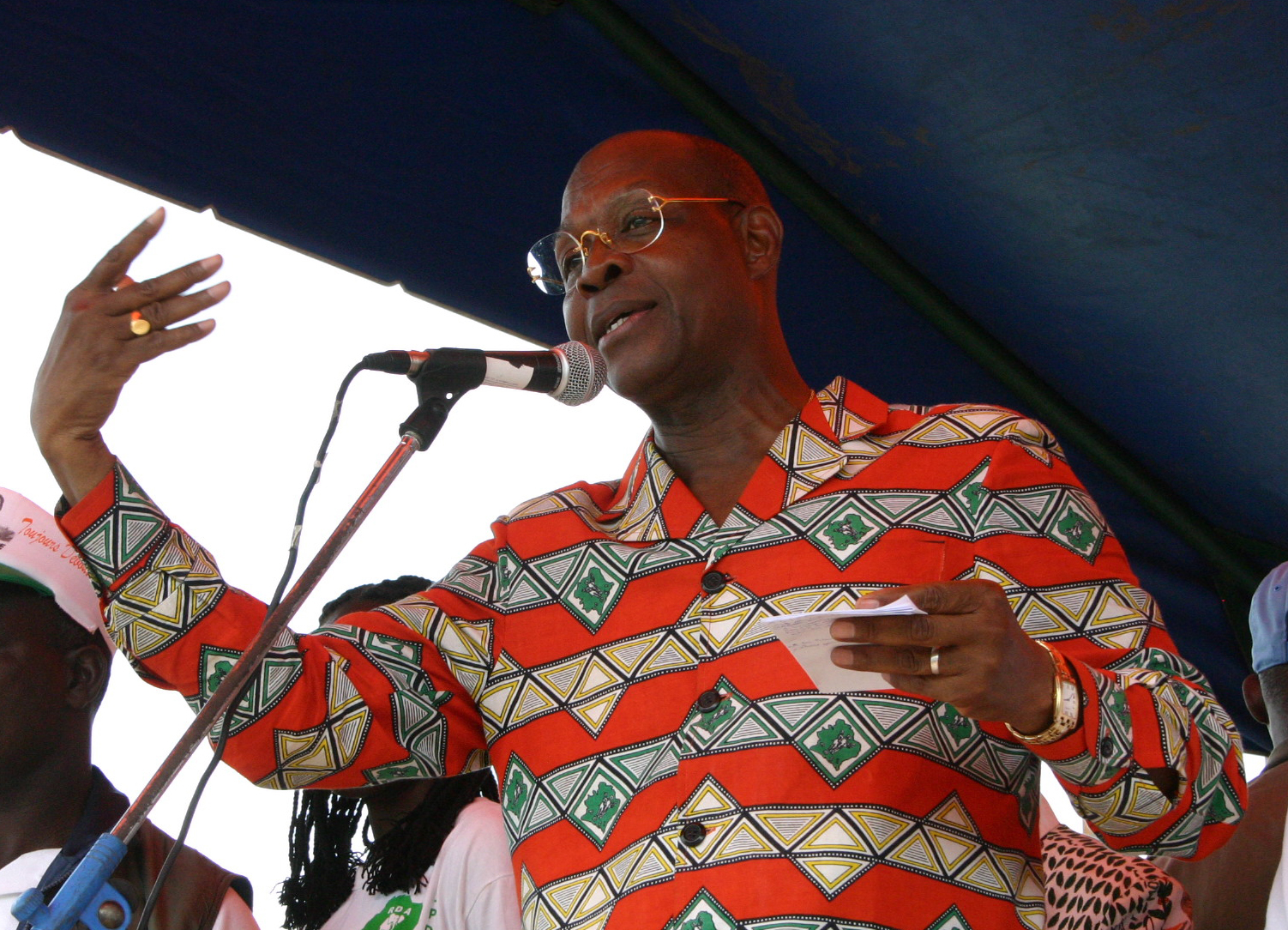
- Koné in 2005

Secretary of State for the Interior
- In office 24 July 1974 – 4 March 1976

Minister of Internal Security
- In office 4 March 1976 – 18 November 1983
- Preceded by: position established
- Succeeded by: Oumar N'Daw

Minister of Security
- In office 15 December 1993 – 22 October 1995
- Preceded by: position established
- Succeeded by: position abolished

Personal details
- Born: 24 April 1939 Katiola, Ivory Coast, French West Africa
- Died: 8 August 2023 (aged 84) Abidjan, Ivory Coast
- Party: PDCI
- Education: Military Academy of Cherchell; École de spécialisation de l'aviation légère de l'armée de terre École des officiers de la gendarmerie nationale
- Occupation: General; Novelist

Gaston Ouassénan Koné (29 April 1939 – 8 August 2023) was an Ivorian general, novelist, and politician of the Democratic Party of Ivory Coast (PDCI).

== Biography ==
Born in Katiola on 29 April 1939, Koné was the youngest son in a family of nine children. In 1946, he entered a private Catholic school in the Diocese of Katiola and attended secondary school at the Lycée classique et moderne de Bouaké. After graduation, he joined the French Armed Forces as a member of the Bataillon autonome de Côte d'Ivoire. In 1959, he enrolled at the Military Academy of Cherchell in Algeria and subsequently furthered his education at the École de spécialisation de l'aviation légère de l'armée de terre and the École des officiers de la gendarmerie nationale. He returned to the country on the eve of the independence of Ivory Coast. During independence, he lowered the French flag flying in front of the National Assembly and hoisted, for the first time, the flag of independent Ivory Coast.

In 1962, Koné created a presidential guard on the command of President Félix Houphouët-Boigny, for whom he piloted helicopter flights. He quickly rose through the ranks, being appointed Senior Commander of the National Gendarmery in 1964. In 1970, at the breakout of the Guébié crisis, Koné commanded a battalion of Ivorian soldiers. He was promoted to brigadier general in 1977 and achieved the rank of major general in 1979.

Koné served as Secretary of State of the Interior in the 8th Houphouët-Boigny government, from 1974 to 1976, and was Minister of Internal Security from 1976 to 1983. He was also Minister of Security under the 1st Duncan government from 1993 to 1995. In addition to his ministerial positions, he was ambassador to Argentina, Chile, and Uruguay.

Koné ran in the 2000 Ivorian presidential election, but his candidacy was disqualified by the Supreme Court. As one of the vice-presidents of the PDCI, he met with President Alassane Ouattara in an attempt to solve the 2020 Ivorian presidential election crisis.

Gaston Ouassénan Koné died in Abidjan on 8 August 2023, at the age of 84.

== Publications ==
- L’homme qui vécut trois vies (1976)
- Aller retour (1977)
- L’empire du gouffre (1990)
- Pauvre petite orpheline (2010)
