= GIGN =

Elite unit of the French National Gendarmerie

National Gendarmerie Intervention Group
- Groupe d'intervention de la Gendarmerie nationale
- Official insignia (2021)
- Active: 1973–present
- Country: France
- Agency: National Gendarmerie
- Type: Tactical unit
- Role: Counter-terrorism; Hostage rescue; VIP protection; High-value asset protection
- Operations jurisdiction: National; International
- Headquarters: Satory, Yvelines, France; 48°47′6.59″N 2°06′25.80″E
- Motto: S'engager pour la vie (A lifelong commitment) (Note: S'engager in French can mean to commit (to do something) but also to enlist (in the military))
- Abbreviation: GIGN

Structure
- Operators: c. 1,000 (including the original unit of around 400 operators based in Satory)

Commanders
- Current commander: Général de brigade Benoît Villeminoz
- Notable commanders: Christian Prouteau; Denis Favier

Notables
- Significant operation(s): See list: Loyada hostage crisis (1976); Grand Mosque seizure (1979); Ouvéa hostage crisis (1988); Air France Flight 8969 hijacking (1994); Île-de-France attacks (2015)
- Awards: Croix de la Valeur Militaire

The GIGN (French: Groupe d'intervention de la Gendarmerie nationale; transl. National Gendarmerie Intervention Group) is the French National Gendarmerie's elite tactical unit. Among its missions are counterterrorism, hostage rescue, surveillance of national threats, protection of government officials, critical site protection (such as French embassies in war-torn countries), and the targeting of organized crime.

Established in 1973 and becoming operational in 1974, the GIGN was initially conceived as a relatively small tactical unit specialized in sensitive hostage situations, but has since grown into a larger force with expanded responsibilities and capabilities. The unit comprises around 400 operators, based in Satory, near Versailles in the Paris Region. It shares jurisdiction of French sovereign territory with the special response units of the National Police. (Note: Each of the French law enforcement agencies, the National Police and the National Gendarmerie, has primary responsibility for a part of the territory: large cities and urban areas for the National Police, smaller cities and rural areas for the National Gendarmerie. There are two National Police units specialised in counter-terrorism and hostage rescue: the RAID and the BRI. If needed, these two can form a joint task force called National Police Intervention Force (French: Force d'intervention de la Police nationale or FIPN). The GIGN and FIPN can be engaged together–or in each other's area of responsibility–during an emergency.) Approximately 600 additional operators make up 14 regional units designated "AGIGN" (French: Antennes du GIGN). They were established in 2016 as a result of the 2015 Paris attacks, by rebranding and expanding the existing "PI2G" units (French: Pelotons d'Intervention de Deuxième Génération), the first of which was created in 2004. Seven of them are located in Metropolitan France like the original unit, with the other half based in French overseas territories. Though originally dissociated from the GIGN, these 14 AGIGN units have been officially integrated and placed under the direct authority of the central GIGN headquarters in Satory in 2021, following a major structural reform in the Gendarmerie.

While most of its missions take place within French territory, the GIGN—as a unit of the National Gendarmerie and thus part of the French Armed Forces—also operates abroad, often in coordination with other branches of the military, and particularly with units of the Special Operations Command. Due to the sensitivity and confidentiality of the unit's missions, GIGN personnel must maintain absolute facial anonymity in all media and the publication of unmasked photographs of operatives is strictly prohibited.

In December 1994, the GIGN rose to worldwide prominence after its operatives successfully stormed and rescued, at Marseille Provence Airport, the passengers of Air France Flight 8969, which had been hijacked by the Armed Islamic Group of Algeria. Since its formation, the GIGN has been involved in over 1,800 missions and has also rescued more than 600 hostages, making it one of the most experienced counter-terrorism units in the world.

== History ==
Location of BRI-BAC, GIGN and RAID (2021).

GIGN was formed in Maisons-Alfort, near Paris, in 1973, shortly after the Munich massacre at the 1972 Summer Olympics and other less-known incidents in France exposed a need for dedicated counterterrorist units.

Initially named ECRI (French: Équipe commando régionale d’intervention, lit. 'Regional Commando Intervention Team'), it became operational in March 1974, under the command of then-lieutenant Christian Prouteau, and executed its first mission ten days later.

Another unit, named GIGN, was created simultaneously within the Mobile Gendarmerie parachute squadron in Mont-de-Marsan in southwest France, but the two units were merged under Prouteau's command in 1976, and adopted the GIGN designation.

GIGNs initial complement was 15, later increased to 32 in 1976, 78 by 1986, and 120 by 2005. GIGN moved to Versailles-Satory in 1982.

In 1984, it became a part of a larger organisation called GSIGN (French: Groupement de sécurité et d'intervention de la Gendarmerie nationale), (Note: In the French Gendarmerie, a groupement (grouping) is typically a battalion- or regiment-size unit but while infantry regiments in the French Army share a common format (ie same number of companies) this is not mandatory for a Gendarmerie groupement) together with EPIGN (French: Escadron parachutiste d'intervention de la Gendarmerie nationale), (Note: A French escadron is equivalent to a British squadron and to either a troop or a company in the US armed forces.) GSPR (French: Groupe de sécurité de la présidence de la République), the Presidential Security group and GISA (French: Groupe d'instruction et de sécurité des activités), a specialized training center.

On 1 September 2007, a major reorganization took place. GSIGN was disbanded and replaced by a new unit also named GIGN. The former GSIGN components (the original GIGN, EPIGN, GSPR and GISA) became "forces" of the new GIGN which now reached a total complement of 380 operators. (Note: The reorganization was conducted by general Denis Favier, who had personally led the Marignane assault in 1994 as GIGN's commander and assumed command of the "new" GIGN in 2007. He later became Director-general of the Gendarmerie Nationale (DGGN) from 2013 to 2016.)

The change from GSIGN to the new GIGN, an organization reporting directly to the Director-general of the Gendarmerie, was not a simple name swap. It was done in order to reinforce command and control functions; provide better integration through common selection, common training and stronger support; and improve the unit's capability to handle complex situations such as mass hostage-takings similar to the Beslan school siege.

In 2009, the Gendarmerie, while remaining part of the French Armed Forces, was attached to the Ministry of the Interior, which already supervised the National Police. The respective areas of responsibility of each force did not change however, as the Police already had primary responsibility for major cities and large urban areas, while the Gendarmerie was in charge of smaller towns and rural areas (in addition to its specific military missions). Under the new command structure, GIGN gendarmes can still be engaged in operations outside of France due to their military status.

In January 2015, GIGN was engaged for the very first time simultaneously with RAID, the National Police tactical unit, during the January 2015 Île-de-France attacks. (Note: The two actions were distinct but coordinated)

On 1 August 2021, the 14 regional GIGN branches were fully integrated in the group's organization as part of a new Force Antennes. Prior to this reorganization, these regional branches, established in 2004, had been administratively attached to the seven domestic "Zonal Gendarmerie Regions" for seven of them and to the Overseas Gendarmerie Command (French: Commandement de la Gendarmerie outre-mer) for the remaining seven but they were independent units that only came under GIGN operational control when a crisis occurred. Sometimes referred to as "GIGN 3.0", (Note: The new GIGN which replaced GSIGN in 2007 was often dubbed GIGN 2.0) the new organization also emphasizes the group's role in training and in operational support.

A new common insignia was adopted as a result of the 2021 reorganization. Shaped as a shield, it worn on the left sleeve by every GIGN gendarme. A circular badge is worn on the right sleeve: the traditional round GIGN patch for Satory-based operators and a different patch for members of the AGIGNs. The AGIGN patch replaces the parachute with a thunderbolt, as AGIGNs are not parachute units.

Since its creation, the group has taken part in over 1,800 operations, rescued over 600 hostages and arrested over 1,500 suspects, losing four members killed in action and ten in training. (Note: Two of the four fatalities involved AGIGN members, the first one occurred in May 2016 at a time when AGIGN's were not yet fully integrated into GIGN which explains why some publications mention "only" three operators killed in action.) Three of the four fatalities in action were sustained when dealing with armed deranged persons. The fourth one occurred during an operation against illegal gold-mining in French Guiana in March 2023.

== Structure ==
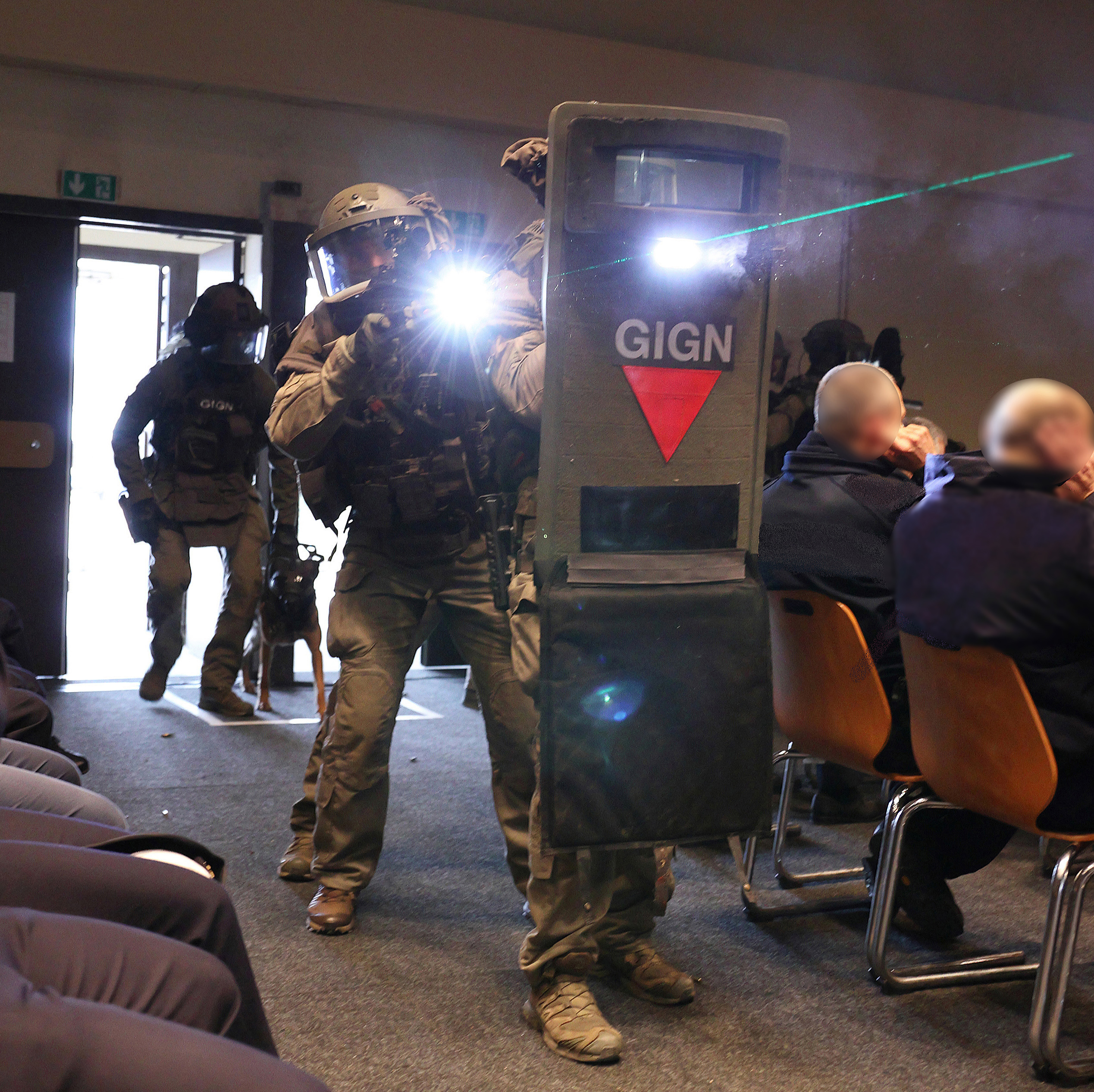
Intervention Force demo

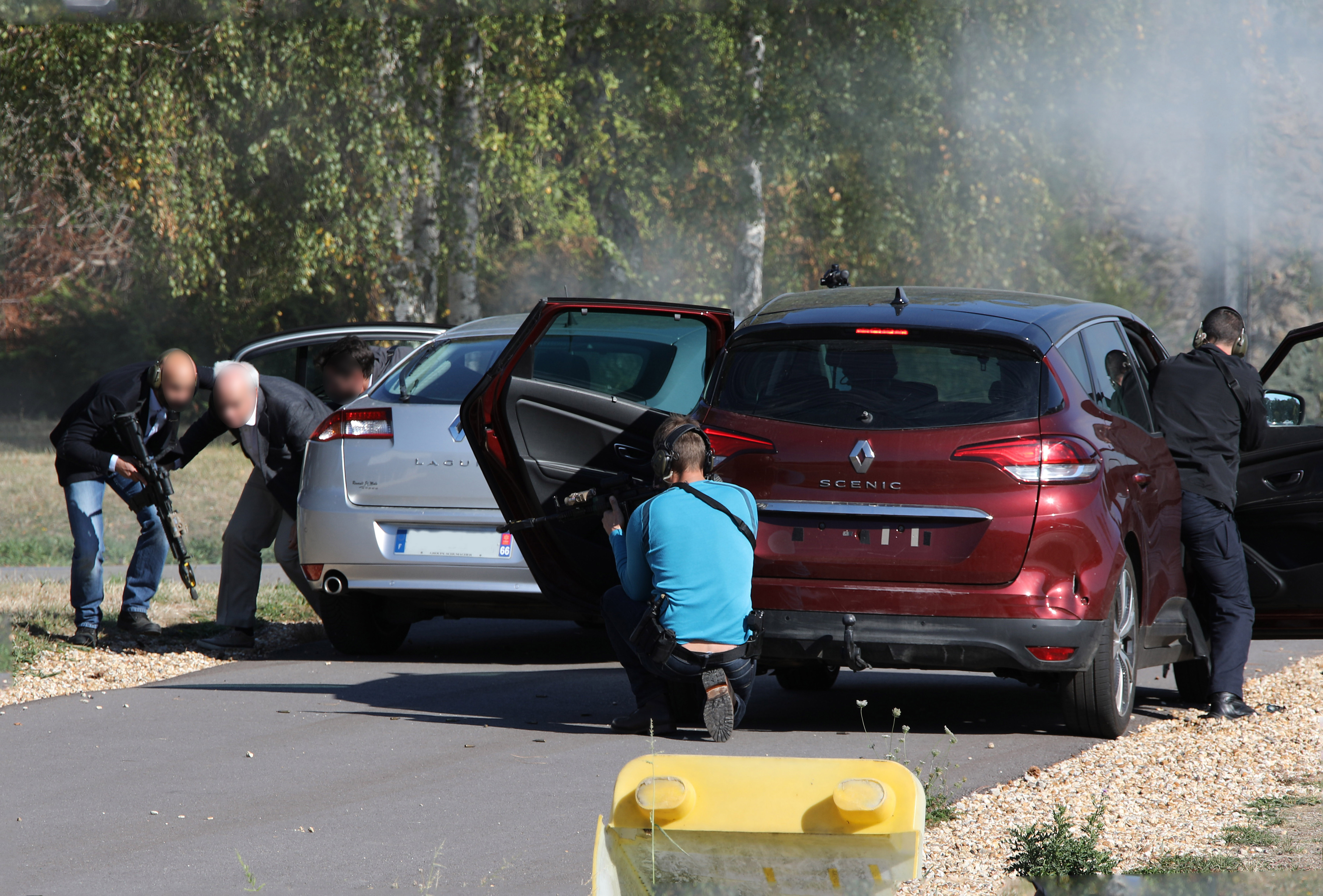
Security & Protection Force demo

GIGN is currently organized in four "forces", a "détachement", an Engineering and Support division, a National Training Center for Specialized Intervention (Note: Intervention Spécialisée is the top tier of the Intervention spectrum. The first tier is "operational intervention" (also called basic intervention) and is taught to every gendarme. The next tier, "intermediate intervention" is for special "Surveillance and intervention" or "Intervention" platoons called "PSIG Sabre" in the Departmental Gendarmerie), PIGM in the Mobile Gendarmerie and PIGR in the Republican Guard.) and a Human Resources bureau, under two headquarters (administrative and operational):

=== Intervention Force ===
Also known as the original GIGN, the Intervention Force (French: Force Intervention) has approximately 100 operators, serving as GIGN's main assault unit. It is divided into four platoons (French: sections), two of which are on alert at all times. These sections are further divided into individual teams of operators. Two of the intervention sections specialize in high altitude jumps; the other two specialize in diving.

=== Observation & Search Force ===
Approximately 40 operators, the Observation & Search Force (French: Force Observation/Recherche (FOR)) specialises in reconnaissance in relation with judiciary police work, and counterterrorism. Formed from the EPIGN.

=== Security & Protection Force ===
Approximately 65 operators, the Security & Protection Force (French: Force Sécurité/Protection) specialises in executive and sensitive site protection. Formed from the EPIGN.

=== Regional Branches Force ===
The Regional Branches Force (French: Force Antennes) serves as the headquarters for the fourteen regional GIGN branches.

=== Gendarmerie Detachment of the GSPR Presidential Security Group ===
The Gendarmerie Detachment of the GSPR Presidential Security Group (French: Détachement GSPR) is tasked with protecting the President of France. Originally a Gendarmerie unit, the GSPR is now jointly operated by the Gendarmerie and the National Police.

=== Engineering and Support Division ===
The Engineering and Support Division (French: Division technique) is a support force with cells specializing in long-range sniping, breaching, assault engineering, special devices, and other specializations.

=== National Training Center for Specialized Intervention ===
The National Training Center for Specialized Intervention (French: Centre national de formation à l'intervention spécialisée) is tasked with selection, training and retraining (called recycling) not only of GIGN operators, but also of selected Gendarmerie or foreign personnel.

=== Regional and overseas branches ===
Although GIGN, as part of the French military, has been deployed to external combat zones, it is primarily centered in France, engaging in peacetime operations as a special police force.

The fourteen regional GIGN branches, initially known as PI2Gs (French: Pelotons d'intervention interrégionaux de la Gendarmerie) for the domestic units and GPIs (French: Groupes de pelotons d'intervention) for the overseas units, were respectively redesignated as GIGN branches in April and July 2016 and fully integrated into GIGN in 2021.

As of 2021, the seven metropolitan GIGN branches are located in Caen, Dijon, Nantes, Orange, Reims, Toulouse and Tours, while the seven overseas branches are based in Guadeloupe, Martinique, French Guiana, Réunion, Mayotte, French Polynesia and New Caledonia.

The twenty nuclear protection units, called PSPGs (French: Pelotons spécialisés de protection de la Gendarmerie), located on site at each one of the French nuclear power plants, are not a part of GIGN, but operate under its operational control.

== Operations ==
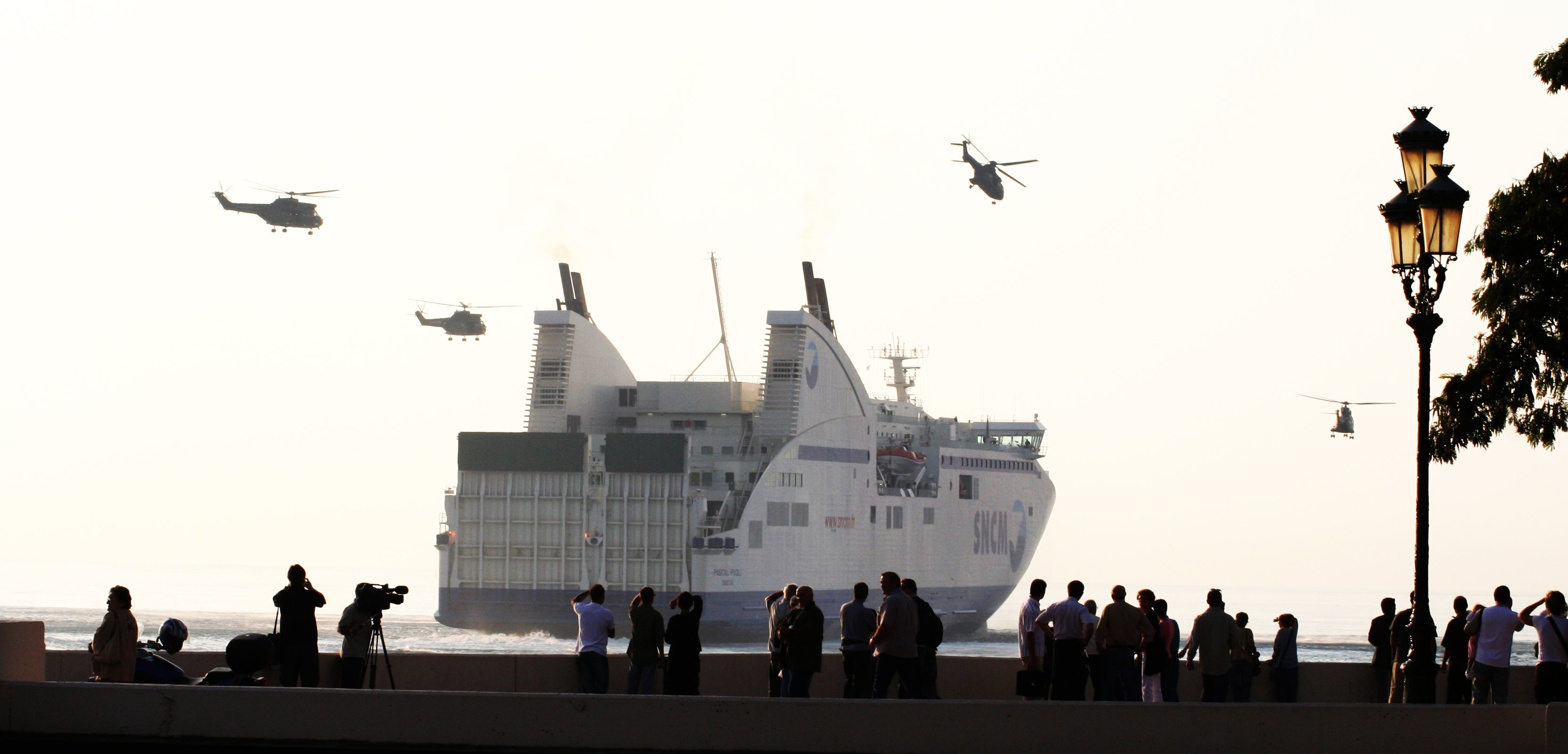
Boarding of the Pascal Paoli by GIGN, on 28 September 2005. The ship had been occupied by the Corsican trade union STC.

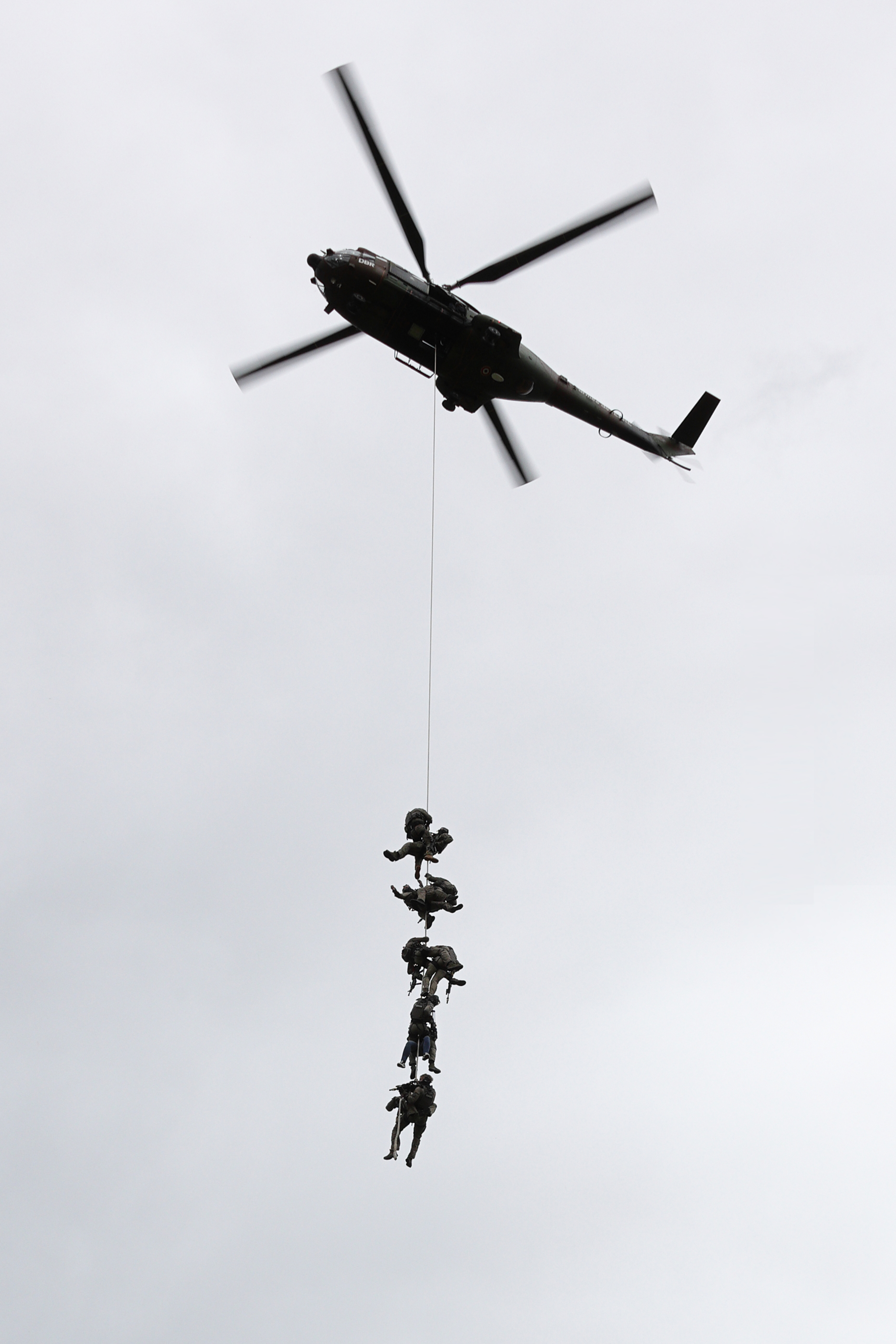
A GIGN Security & Protection Force team extracting via helicopter during a demo in 2021

GIGN reports directly to the Director General of the Gendarmerie Nationale (DGGN), i.e., the chief of staff of the Gendarmerie, who in turn reports directly to the Ministry of the Interior.

The DGGN or his Deputy for Operations can take charge in a major crisis; however, most of the day-to-day missions are conducted in support of local units of the Departmental Gendarmerie. GIGN is also a member of the European ATLAS Network, an informal association consisting of the special police units of the 27 states of the European Union.

=== Known operations ===
Known GIGN operations include:

- Rescue of 30 French pupils from a school bus captured by the Front de Libération de la Côte des Somalis in Loyada, Djibouti in 1976. GIGN snipers and French Foreign Legion troops killed the hostage-takers in an operation that was only partially successful, as two children were killed.
- Planning the rescue of diplomats from the French Embassy in San Salvador in 1979; the hostage-takers surrendered before the assault was conducted.
- Advising Saudi authorities during the Grand Mosque Seizure in Mecca, Saudi Arabia, in November and December 1979.
- Arrest of several Corsican terrorists of the National Liberation Front of Corsica at the Fesch Hostel in 1980 during the Bastelica-Fesch affair.
- Arrest of suspected Irish terrorists in the Irish of Vincennes affair, in August 1982.
- Rescue of hostages during the Ouvéa cave hostage taking in Ouvea, New Caledonia in May 1988.
- Protection of the 1992 Olympic Winter Games in Albertville.
- Rescue of 229 passengers and crew from Air France Flight 8969 in Marseille in December 1994. Nine GIGN operators were wounded during the operation, but all four hijackers were killed. The mission was broadcast live by news channels, increasing awareness of GIGN's existence.
- Arrest of the mercenary Bob Denard and his group during a coup attempt in 1995 in Comoros (Operation Azalee).
- Operations in Bosnia to arrest persons indicted for war crimes.
- Capture of 6 Somali pirates, and recovery of part of the ransom, after ensuring that Le Ponant luxury yacht hostages were freed off the coast of Puntland, Somalia in the Gulf of Aden, in conjunction with French Commandos Marine in April 2008.
- Deployment of tactical teams in Afghanistan in support of French Gendarmerie POMLT (Police Operational Mentoring Liaison Team) detachments from 2009 to 2011.
- Deployment in Libya during Operation Harmattan in 2011.
- Neutralization of the two terrorists involved in the Paris Charlie Hebdo shooting on 7 January 2015.
- Deployment to the 2015 Bamako hotel attack, although the situation had already been taken care of by local police, with assistance from American and French special forces, by the time the GIGN team arrived.
- Neutralization of the terrorist responsible for the Carcassonne and Trèbes attack in March 2018 (a former EPIGN officer, Arnaud Beltrame, voluntarily swapped places with a hostage and was killed trying to disarm the terrorist). This operation was conducted by an AGIGN unit based in Toulouse under GIGN supervision, while operatives sent from Satory were still underway.
- Several deployments in Ukraine in 2022 to protect various French or International missions during the Russian invasion.
- Deployment to counter unrest in New Caledonia in 2024

GIGN was selected by the International Civil Aviation Organisation (ICAO) to organise hostage-rescue exercises aboard planes for the special forces of the other member states.

=== Coordination with RAID ===
Coordination between GIGN and RAID, the National Police's tactical unit, is handled by a joint organization called Ucofi (French: Unité de coordination des forces d’intervention, lit. 'Intervention Forces Coordination Unit').

A "leader/follower" protocol has been established for use when both units need to be engaged jointly, (Note: As was the case following the 7 January 2015 Charlie Hebdo assassinations.) leadership belonging to the unit operating in its primary areas of responsibility.

== Selection and training ==
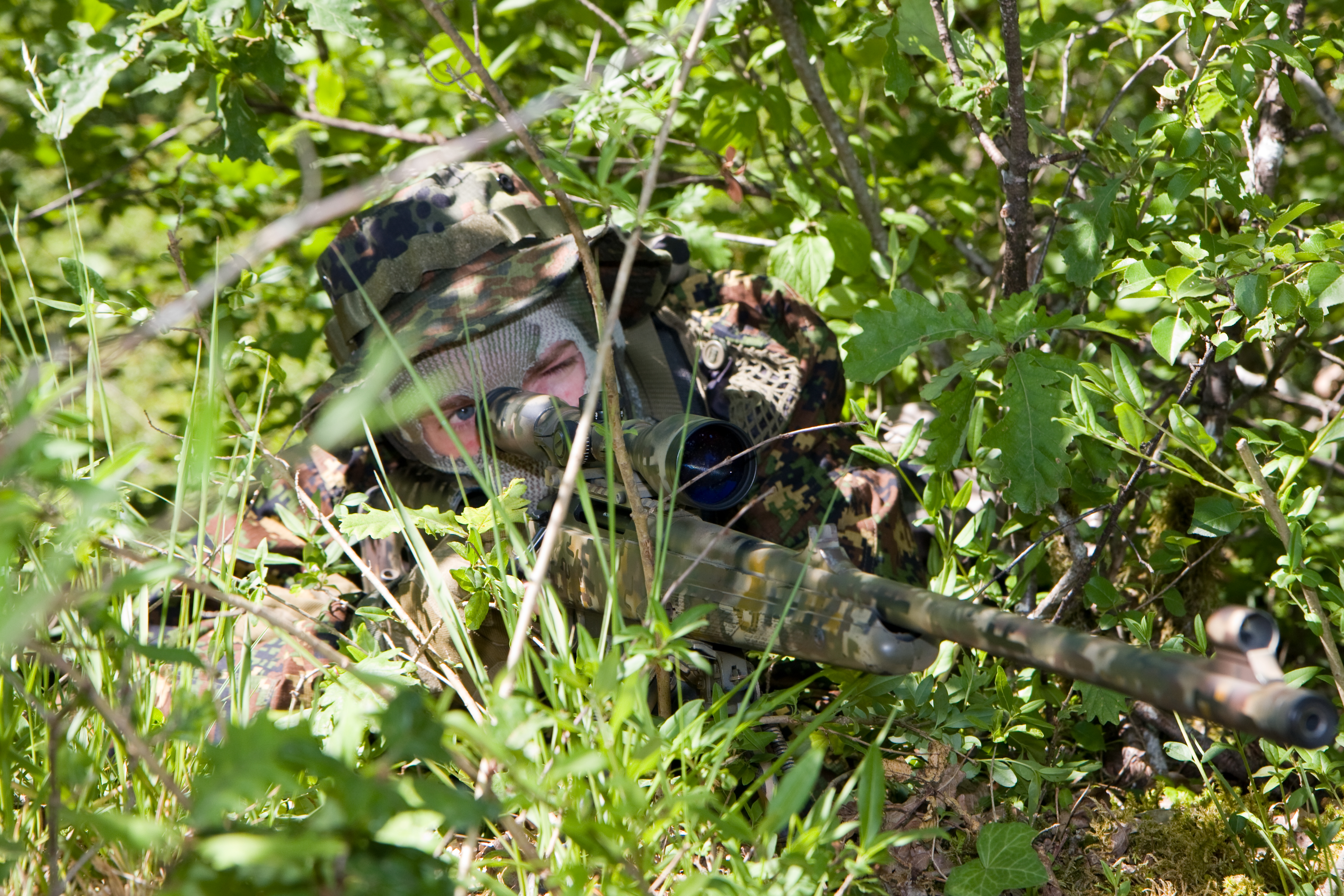
GIGN sniper in training

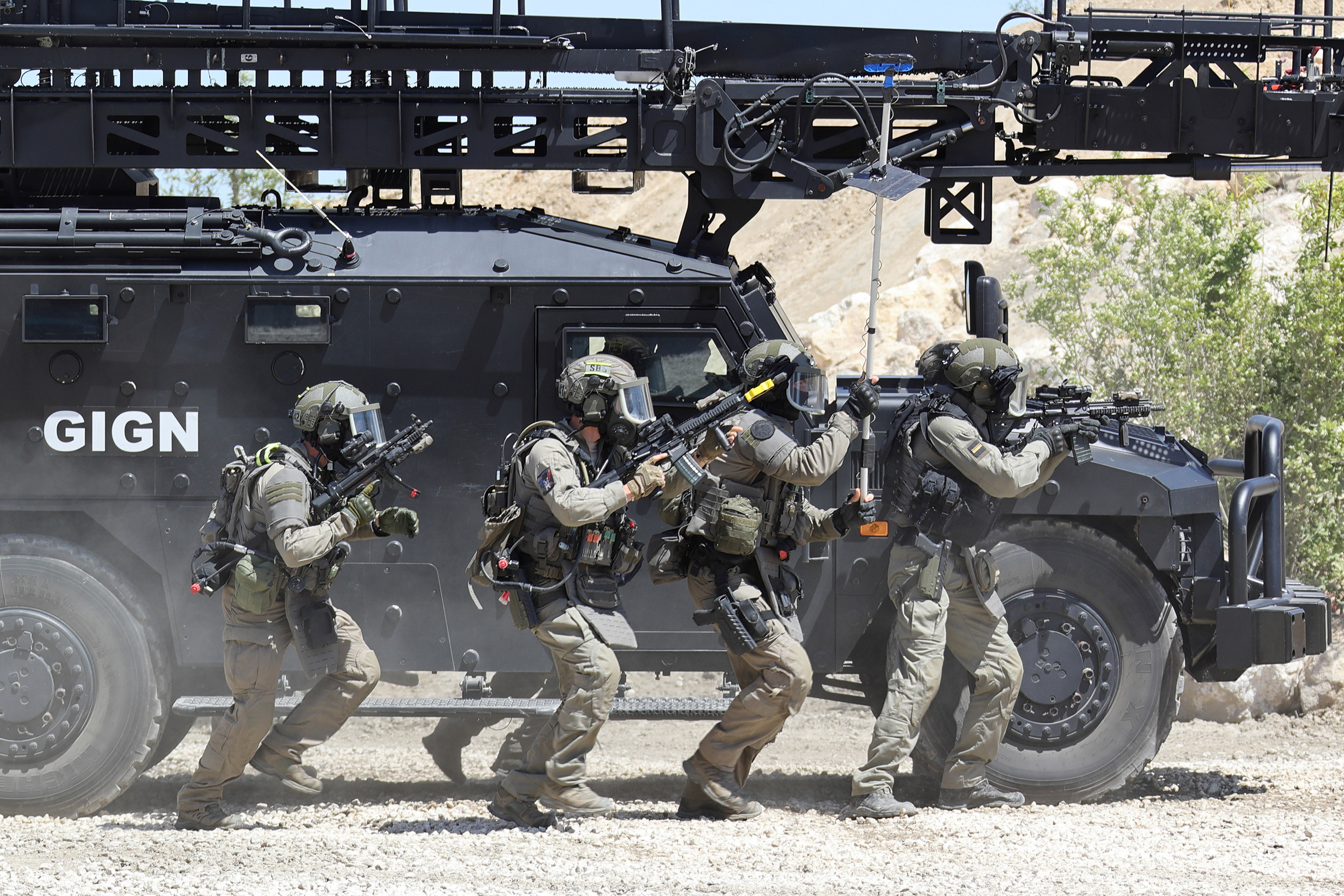
GIGN operators alongside an armored vehicle

Candidates undertake a one-week pre-selection screening followed by, for those accepted, a fourteen-month training program. Mental ability and self-control are important, in addition to physical strength.

Similar to most special forces, the training is stressful with a high rate of failure, especially in the initial phase; only 7–8% of the volunteers complete the training process. AGIGN candidates undertake a one-week pre-selection screening followed by an eight-week training program.

GIGN training consists of:

- Weapon handling
- Combat shooting and marksmanship training
- Airborne courses, such as HALO or HAHO jumps, paragliding, and heliborne insertions
- Underwater combat, swimming, diving, and naval boarding
- Hand-to-hand combat training
- Undercover surveillance and stalking (investigative cases support)
- Infiltration and escape techniques
- Explosive ordnance disposal
- Chemical, biological, radiological, and nuclear device neutralization
- Survival and warfare in tropical, arctic, mountain and desert environments
- Diplomacy and negotiation skills

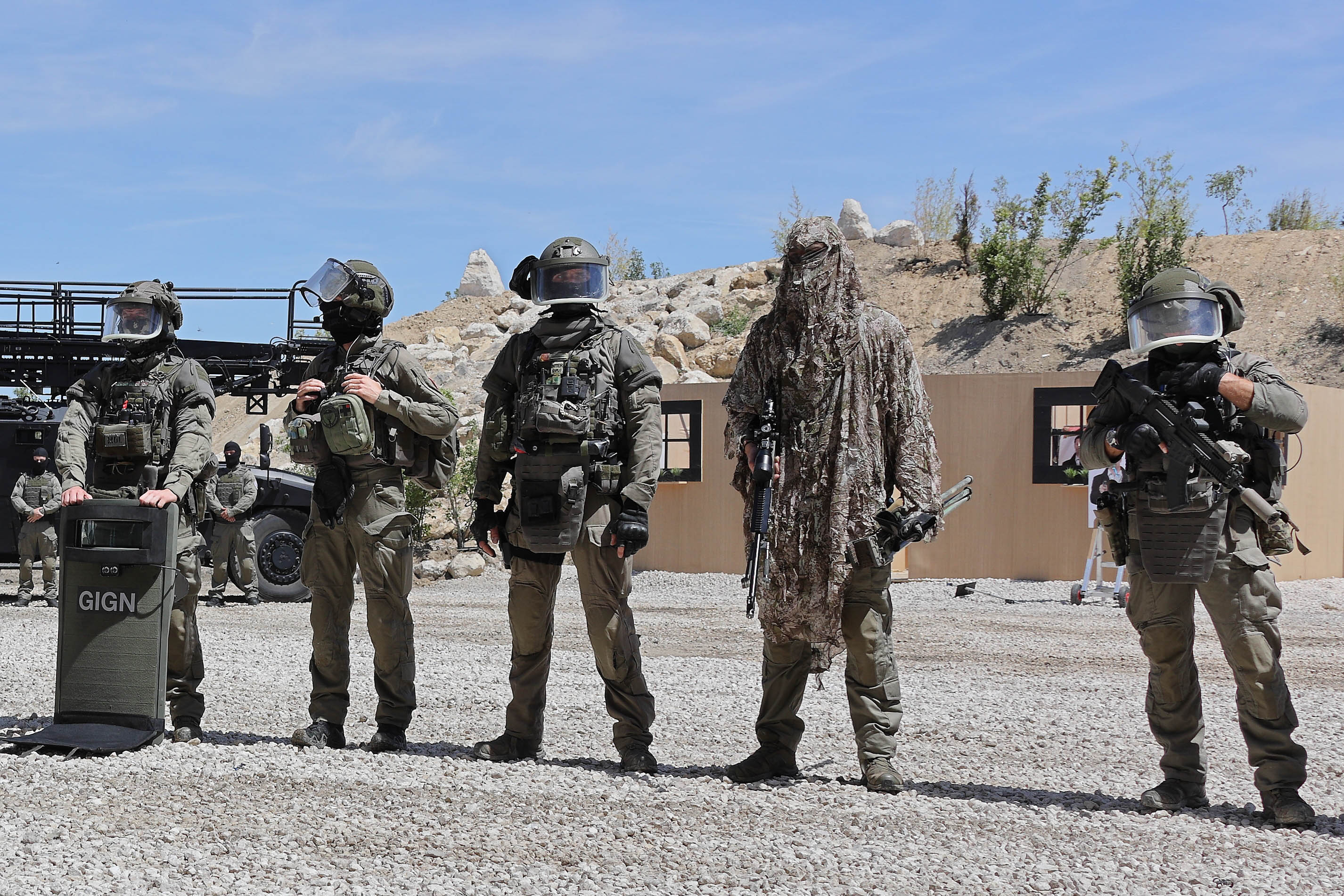
GIGN operators with their weapons and equipment in 2022

Female gendarmes are admitted in all forces, but none have so far succeeded in joining the Intervention Force.

There are several tactical specialties in the group, including: long-range sniping, breaching, observation and reconnaissance, executive protection, freefall parachuting with HALO/HAHO jumps, diving, etc.

The GIGN trains alongside other counterterrorist units from NATO countries, including the American FBI HRT, British SAS, Australian SPS, German GSG 9, and Irish Garda ERU.

== Weapons and equipment ==
GIGN uses a wide range of firearms and equipment, including:

=== Firearms ===
Name	Origin	Type	Notes
Taser X26	United States	Less lethal	Since 2003
Manurhin MR 73	France	Revolver	Not used operationally
Glock 17	Austria	Pistol	
Glock 19	Austria	Pistol	
Glock 26	Austria	Pistol	
FN Five-seveN	Belgium	Pistol	
Heckler & Koch MP5	Germany	Submachine gun	A3, A5, SD and K-PDW variants
Heckler & Koch UMP	Germany	Submachine gun	
SIG MPX	United States	Submachine gun	
Heckler & Koch MP7	Germany	Personal defense weapon	
FN P90	Belgium	Personal defense weapon	
Remington 870	United States	Shotgun	
Mossberg 590	United States	Shotgun	
Benelli M3	Italy	Shotgun	M3T.
Benelli M4	Italy	Shotgun	
Heckler & Koch HK416	Germany	Assault rifle	
FN SCAR	Belgium	Assault rifle	L and H variants
Colt M4	United States	Assault rifle	
SIG MCX	United States	Assault rifle	MCX Rattler variant
SIG SG 550	Switzerland	Assault rifle	551, 552, 553 variants
CZ BREN 2	Czech Republic	Assault rifle	Chambered in 7.62x39mm to replace HK 416s.
Heckler & Koch HK417	Germany	Sniper rifle	
Accuracy International Arctic Warfare	United Kingdom	Sniper rifle	.308 and .338 variants
Accuracy International AXSR	United Kingdom	Sniper rifle	
Tikka T3	Finland	Sniper rifle	
PGM 338	France	Sniper rifle	
PGM Hécate II	France	Sniper rifle	12.7x99mm variant
FN Minimi	Belgium	Sniper rifle	Machine gun
Heckler & Koch HK69	Germany	Grenade launcher	
B&T GL-06	Switzerland	Grenade launcher	
Milkor MGL	South Africa	Grenade launcher	

=== Individual equipment ===
- Grenades
- Ballistic shields
- Ballistic helmets with mounted visors
- Plate carrier
- Balaclava
- Tactical gloves
- NVGs (Night Vision Goggles)

=== Vehicles ===
Various types of armored vehicles, both civilian-style SUVs and dedicated armoured personnel carriers are used, some fitted with assault ladders installed on the roof.

Helicopter support is provided by Gendarmerie helicopters and, for tactical deployment of large groups, by GIH (French: Groupe interarmées d'hélicoptères), a joint Army/Air Force special operations flight equipped with SA330 PUMA helicopters, based in nearby Villacoublay Air Base. GIH was established in 2006, and has also been tasked to support the National Police's RAID unit since 2008.

== Operational medical support ==
1st Specialized Medical Unit.

During each mission, a nurse and a physician from the 1st Specialized Medical Unit (1re Antenne Médicale Spécialisée), a unit of the French Defence Health Service (SSA) based in Satory, accompany the GIGN sections. The medical unit is primarily responsible for providing medical support to GIGN personnel, including medical monitoring and the treatment of injured personnel. Medical personnel are also involved in psychological monitoring and the screening of psychological injuries.

Medical personnel assigned to support the GIGN also undergo the Specialized Intervention Training (Stage d'intervention spécialisée), which provides them with the knowledge and skills required to operate alongside specialized intervention units.

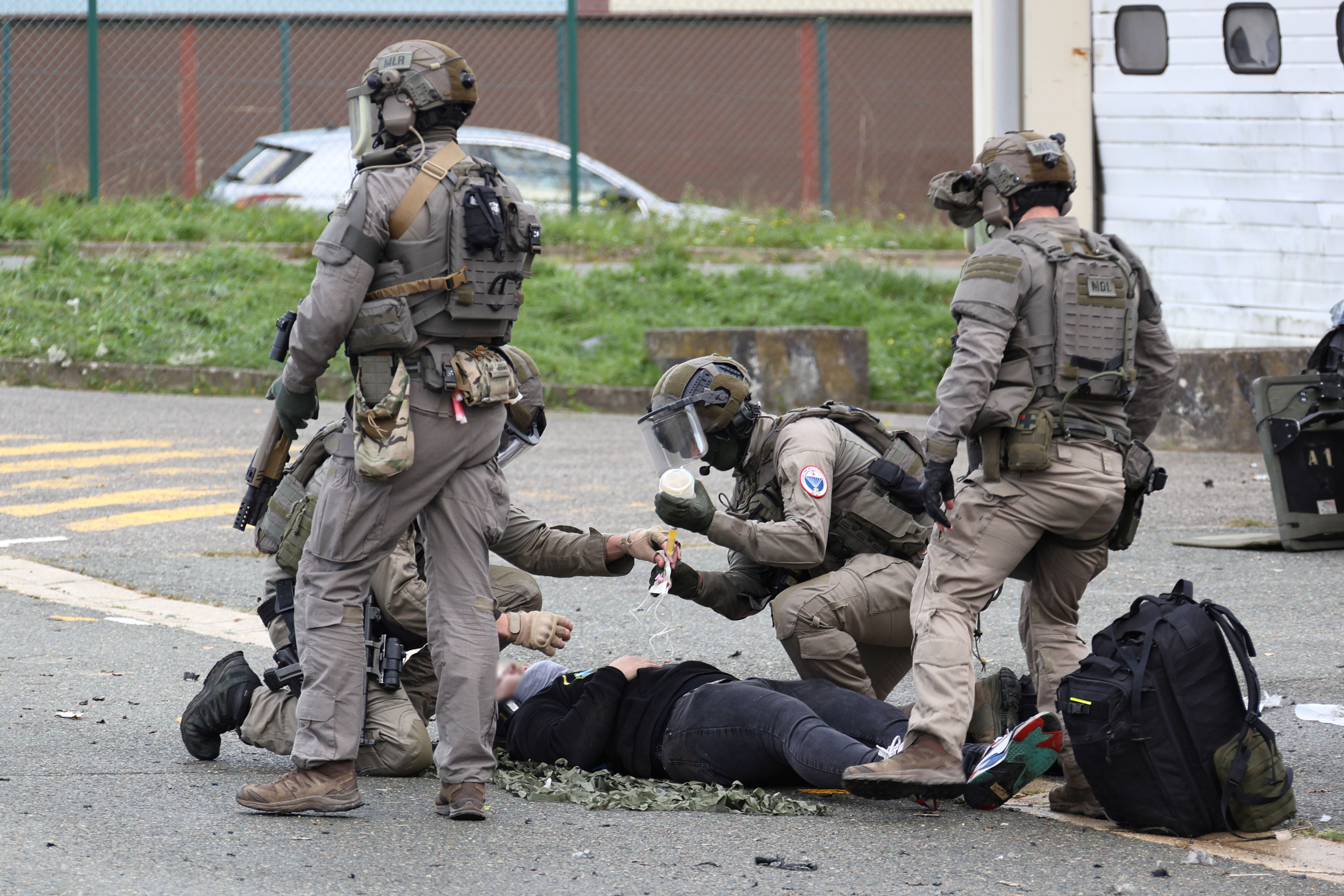
GIGN medical team during a demonstration.

Some SSA medical personnel may also hold operational qualifications, including parachuting, allowing them to be deployed closer to the units they support. They can therefore provide medical support to GIGN personnel in demanding operational environments.

=== Scientific research ===
Medical personnel supporting the GIGN have contributed to scientific publications addressing the specific aspects of medical support during operations, including emergency medicine, operational medicine, and the medical and psychological consequences of interventions.

In 2016, La Revue de l'infirmière published an article on nursing practice within the GIGN. The authors describe the specific characteristics of medical support integrated into a specialized intervention unit and the role of nurses in providing medical assistance during operations.

In 2017, a study published in the Journal of the Royal Army Medical Corps analyzed the medical causes of temporary or definitive withdrawal from the GIGN's selection process.

In 2026, a study published in the Journal of Trauma and Acute Care Surgery examined 242 GIGN operations conducted in France between 2018 and 2022. The study analyzed, among other aspects, the organization of embedded medical support, the treatment of casualties, and the time required to access medical resources.

Other studies involving personnel from the French Defence Health Service have addressed prehospital care techniques in hostile environments, including the use of the intranasal route for analgesia, as well as the organization of medical care for mass-casualty incidents.

=== History ===
==== Claude Kalfon ====
General physician Claude Kalfon was involved in the establishment of medical support for the GIGN in the 1980s. He subsequently served as chief physician to the Presidency of the French Republic under François Mitterrand, and continued in this role under Jacques Chirac · · · .

==== Jean-Michel Churlaud ====
In 1988, during Operation Victor, physician Jean-Michel Churlaud participated in the treatment of wounded personnel. In an account of the operation, Michel Lefèvre, commander of the GIGN assault group, described Churlaud and two other physicians moving towards the wounded to provide initial medical treatment while the fighting was still taking place. The same source reports that GIGN personnel provided protection for the physicians while they treated the wounded and that Churlaud continued providing medical care despite the ongoing gunfire.

==== Bernard Viala ====
General physician Bernard Viala served with the GIGN for nine years, including as chief physician. In 1994, he participated with GIGN medical personnel in the assault on Air France Flight 8969, which had been hijacked and was subsequently stormed in Marseille. In 2021, he published an account of his career as a military physician.

== Motto and values ==
Date	French	English	Reference
Until 2014	Sauver des vies au mépris de la sienne	To save lives without regard to one's own	
Since 2014	S'engager pour la vie	A lifelong commitment	

Respect for human life, combined with fire discipline, has always been taught to group members since its inception. Each new member is traditionally issued a six-shot revolver as a reminder of these values.

== GIGN leaders ==
- Chef d'escadron Christian Prouteau: 1973–1982
- Capitaine Paul Barril: 1982–1983 (Interim)
- Capitaine Philippe Masselin: 1983–1985
- Chef d'escadron Philippe Legorjus: 1985–1989
- Chef d'escadron Lionel Chesneau: 1989–1992
- Chef d'escadron Denis Favier: 1992–1997
- Chef d'escadron Eric Gerard: 1997–2002
- Lieutenant Colonel Frédéric Gallois: 2002-2007
- Général de Brigade Denis Favier: 2007–2011
- Général de Brigade Thierry Orosco: 2011–2014
- Général de Brigade Hubert Bonneau: 2014–2017
- Général de Brigade Laurent Phélip: 2017–2020
- Général de Division Ghislain Réty: August 2020 - October 2025
- General de brigade Benoît Villeminoz since November 2025

== Awards ==
On 9 December 2011, French Defense Minister Gérard Longuet, awarded the Cross for Military Valour to the GIGN for its contribution to Operation Harmattan in Libya. On 31 July 2013, the GIGN was awarded a second Cross for Military Valour for its operations during the War in Afghanistan.

On 15 June 2015, the unit received the Medal for internal security. As the GIGN was awarded the Cross for Military Valour twice, members of the group are officially allowed to wear the fourragère.

== See also ==
- ATLAS Network
- Law enforcement in France
- List of police tactical units
- RAID
- Research and Intervention Brigade
- Brigades nautiques et fluviales
- GSG 9

== Notes and references ==
=== Bibliography ===
- Collective (2012). Le GIGN par le GIGN (in French). éditions LBM. ISBN 978-2-9153-4794-4.
- Collective (2006). Encyclopédie de la Gendarmerie Nationale, tome III (in French). Paris: éditions SPE Barthelemy. ISBN 2-912838-21-5.
