= School of Applied Artillery =

Military academy of the French Army

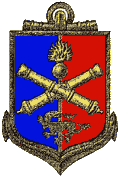
Coat of arms

The School of Applied Artillery (French: École d'application de l'artillerie) is an applied military academy of the French Army. It is based in Draguignan.

== Pre-Revolutionary history ==
During the 18th Century, there were several artillery schools. The first was created by Louis XIV in Douai in 1679. Later schools were created in Metz and Strasbourg. In 1671 the king created a Royal Fusilier Regiment responsible for artillery, composed of four companies: gunners, sappers and entrenchers, carpenters, and other artillery laborers who were used as bridge-builders. Other artillery schools were founded in Besançon, Grenoble, Auxonne, Metz, Perpignan and Valence.

- Thus, according to Mau of Jaisse, there were five schools by 1680.
- According to the General Map of the French Monarchy of 1720, they were then located in Metz, Fère, Strasbourg, Perpignan and Grenoble.
- According to the Royal Almanac, in 1789 there were seven artillery schools, in Valence, Douai, Auxonne, Fère, Metz, Besançon and Strasbourg.

In 1693, the Royal Fusilier Regiment took the name "Royal Artillery", and in 1755 they were joined with companies of sapper s and engineers to create the Royal Corps of Engineers and Artillery. In 1758 the corps of engineers and the artillery were separated.

== After the French Revolution ==
By the Decree of 18 Floréal of the Year III (by the French Republican Calendar), a new artillery school was created in Toulouse, bringing the total number to eight. An advanced (élèves) artillery school was founded in 1791 in Châlons-en-Champagne (Châlons-sur-Marne). In 1807 it joined with the School of Engineering to form the School of Applied Artillery and Engineering in Metz. This school was relocated to Fontainebleau in 1871. The School of Artillery became independent in 1912. Then artillery units moved to Nîmes (1940–1942), and then relocated to the United States military base in Cherchell, Algeria (1942–1945) for during the Second World War.

== After World War II ==
After the liberation of France in 1945, the school was re-formed in Idar-Oberstein. At the same time, the Center for Ground Anti-Aircraft Forces was created in Nîmes, before becoming the School of Applied Ground-to-Air Artillery (EAASA). At the end of 1952, the School of Applied Artillery reopened its facilities in its town of origin: Châlons-sur-Marne.

In 1976, the school moved to new buildings near Draguignan before joining the EAASA in 1983. In 1995, Arnaud Beltrame, who would sacrifice his life to save a hostage in a terrorist attack in 2018, graduated from the School of Applied Artillery.

A fanfare band under the school was established in August 1983 under the impetus of General Servun then Assistant Colonel of the EAA. It is currently one of two official artillery musical formations, with the other being the Musique de l'Artillerie. It is made up of a non-commissioned officer who serves as the Trumpet Major, fifteen volunteer army volunteers and four reservists (including one non-commissioned officer). Its uniform is based on those worn by the horse artillery troopers of the Imperial Guard of the Second French Empire. Its instrumentation includes natural cavalry chromatic fanfare trumpets, trumpet horns (trompette cor), bass fanfare trumpets, tubas, sousaphones, timpani, snare drums and a bass drum.
