= Air France Flight 8969 =

1994 aircraft hijacking

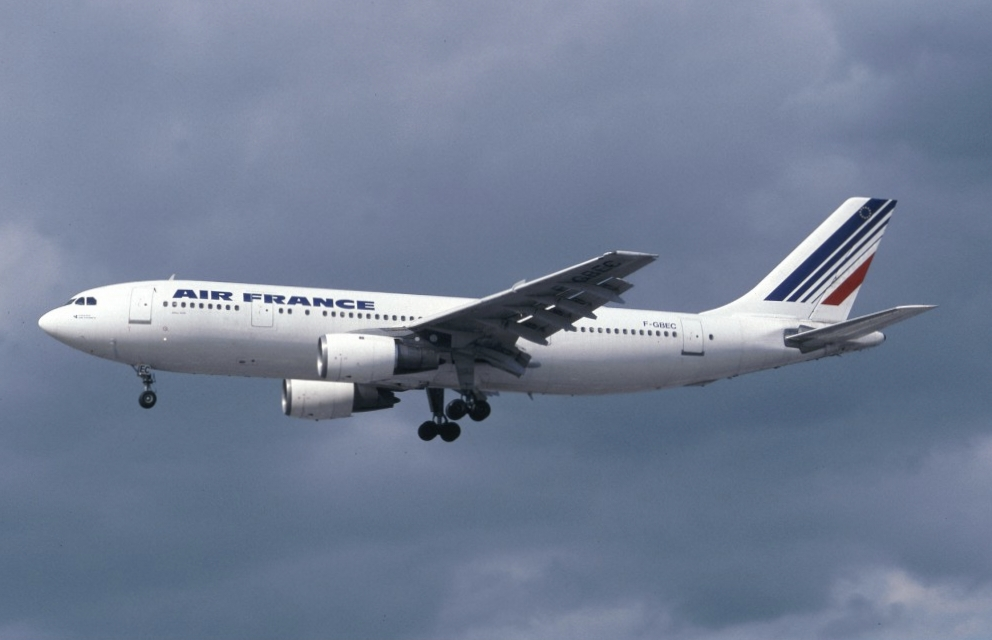
- F-GBEC, the aircraft involved in the hijacking, seen in August 1994

Hijacking
- Date: 24 December 1994 – 26 December 1994
- Summary: Hijacking by Armed Islamic Group of Algeria
- Site: 24–25 December: Houari Boumediene Airport, Algiers, Algeria 26 December: Marseille Provence Airport, Marseille, France; 43°26′23″N 5°12′54″E
- Total fatalities: 7 (including 4 hijackers)
- Total injuries: 25 (including 9 GIGN)

Aircraft
- Aircraft type: Airbus A300B2-1C
- Operator: Air France
- IATA flight No.: AF8969
- ICAO flight No.: AFR8969
- Call sign: AIRFRANS 8969
- Registration: F-GBEC
- Flight origin: Houari Boumedienne Airport, Algiers, Algeria
- Destination: Paris–Orly Airport, Paris, France
- Occupants: 236 (including 4 hijackers)
- Passengers: 224 (including 4 hijackers)
- Crew: 12
- Fatalities: 7 (including 4 hijackers)
- Injuries: 16
- Survivors: 229

Ground casualties
- Ground injuries: 9 (GIGN)

Air France Flight 8969 (Operation Rock Climber) was an Air France Airbus A300 flight that was hijacked on 24 December 1994 at Houari Boumediene Airport, Algiers. The militants murdered three passengers and their intention was either to detonate the aircraft over the Eiffel Tower or the Tour Montparnasse in Paris. When the aircraft reached Marseille, the GIGN, a counterterrorism and hostage rescue unit of the French National Gendarmerie, stormed the plane and killed all four hijackers. The incident led to Air France halting their flights to Algeria until 2004, two years after the end of the Algerian Civil War.

== Background ==
Algeria was in a state of civil war at the time of the hijacking. Aircraft flying to Algeria faced the possibility of missile attacks. As a result, Air France's flights to Algeria had crews composed entirely of people who volunteered for the route.

== Aircraft and crew ==
The aircraft involved was a 14-year old Airbus A300B2-1C, registered as F-GBEC with MSN 104 and was equipped with two General Electric CF6-50C2R engines.

Bernard Dhellemme, aged 51, was the captain of the flight. Jean-Paul Borderie was the copilot, and Alain Bossuat was the flight engineer.

== Hijacking ==
=== 24 December ===
On 24 December 1994, at Houari Boumedienne Airport in Algiers, four armed men boarded Air France Flight 8969 which was due to depart for Orly Airport, Paris at 11:15 a.m. The men were dressed as Algerian presidential police; they wore blue uniforms with Air Algérie logos. Their presence originally did not cause any alarm. Two of the men began inspecting the passengers' passports while one went into the cockpit and the fourth stood guard. Claude Burgniard, a veteran flight attendant, recalled noticing that the "police" were armed and one of them had dynamite showing, which she considered to be unusual as the Algerian police were not normally armed when carrying out checks. The Algerian military felt suspicious on noticing that the Air France flight appeared to have an unauthorised delay, so they began surrounding the aircraft. Zahida Kakachi, a passenger, recalled seeing members of the Special Intervention Group (GIS), known as "ninjas", outside the aircraft. Kakachi recalled hearing one of the "police" say "Tāghūt (Arabic: طَاغُوت)", an Arabic word for "tyrant", upon seeing the GIS men gathering outside the A300; she then realised that the four men on board the plane were militants. The four hijackers then revealed that they were not police, but mujahideen seeking to establish an Islamic state in Algeria. They had hijacked the aircraft because the national airline Air France was a symbol of France, which they viewed as "infidel foreign invaders".

The leader, Abdul Abdullah Yahia, already a notorious murderer, and the other three members of the Armed Islamic Group (Groupe Islamique Armé, or GIA) brandished firearms and explosives and announced their allegiance to the GIA, demanding co-operation from the 220 passengers and 12 flight crew. The hijackers had AK-47 automatic rifles, Uzi submachine guns, pistols, homemade hand grenades and two 10-stick dynamite packs. Later, at one point during the flight, the men placed one pack of dynamite in the cockpit and one pack under a seat in the middle of the aircraft, then linked them with detonator wire. They also took the uniforms of the pilots to confuse Algerian army snipers.

Burgniard recalled that the hijackers, in particular one called "Lotfi", disliked seeing a lack of adherence to their Islamic beliefs; according to Burgniard, the hijackers objected to men and women sitting together and sharing the same toilets and women having their heads uncovered. Once they had taken control of the aircraft, the hijackers forced the women to cover their heads, including the cabin crew members. Women who did not have veils used aircraft blankets as head coverings. An elderly Algerian man told the TF1 network that the hijackers "had a kind of art in their terror. Twenty minutes of relaxation and twenty minutes of torture. You never knew what was next."

The men stated over the aircraft's cockpit radio:

We are the Soldiers of Mercy. Allah has selected us as his soldiers. We are here to wage war in his name.

— Abdul Abdullah Yahia

Abderrahmane Meziane Chérif, Algeria's minister for the interior, came to the airport control tower to begin negotiating with the hijackers, who were using the captain to speak for them. They demanded the release of two Islamic Salvation Front (FIS) political party leaders, Abassi Madani and Ali Belhadj, who were under house arrest; the FIS was banned in Algeria in 1992. Chérif demanded that the hijackers begin releasing children and the elderly if they wanted to talk to the Algerian government. The media began arriving at the airport to cover the crisis.

At noon, the French minister for foreign affairs, Alain Juppé, organised a crisis team meeting, and Charles Pasqua, France's interior minister, met his aides. French prime minister Édouard Balladur was recalled from his Christmas holiday in Chamonix, France, and other government officials were also summoned from their vacations. Balladur recollected spending the entire afternoon on the telephone, trying to determine what was happening and feeling confused. According to Balladur, the Algerian authorities wanted to crack down on the militants and Balladur himself encountered difficulties discussing the events. At one point, the hijackers dropped the demand for the release of the FIS party leaders. Two hours into the hijacking, the men told the captain to depart for Paris so that they could hold a press conference there. The captain could not take off because the aircraft boarding stairs were still attached to the plane and the Algerian authorities were blocking the runway with parked vehicles. When the hijackers forced the captain to ask for the boarding stairs to be removed, the Algerian authorities refused, determined not to give in to any of the hijackers' demands. The GIA men announced that they would detonate the aircraft unless the Algerian authorities followed their orders.

During the passport check, the hijackers had noticed that one of the passengers on the flight was an Algerian police officer. In order to force the Algerian government to comply with their demands, the hijackers approached the police officer and told him to follow them. Kakachi remembered that the police officer, seated two rows behind her, was hesitant as he did not know what they were going to do. Several passengers recalled him pleading "Don't kill me, I have a wife and child!" The hijackers shot the police officer in the head at the top of the boarding stairs. The pilots and most of the passengers were not aware at first that the man had been killed. Captain Dhellemme recalled that his first contact with the passenger cabin during the hijacking was when a flight attendant, allowed into the cockpit, asked the pilots if they needed anything. According to Dhellemme, he asked for a glass of water from the attendant to ease the pilots' parched throats. At this point, the attendant whispered to Dhellemme that the hijackers had killed a passenger.

The Algerian authorities still refused to agree to the hijackers' demands. Burgniard recalled that he and the other occupants began to realise that "things were going wrong" when the hijackers came to collect another passenger. They selected 48-year-old Bui Giang To, a commercial attaché at the Embassy of Vietnam in Algeria. Burgniard described To as "the real foreigner on this plane". She remembered that To was not intimidated by the hijackers and she believed that this attitude upset the hijackers. The Vietnamese diplomat may have thought he was about to be released because he was a foreigner; instead he was shot dead on the boarding stairs. Dhellemme recalled that when the flight attendant next appeared with refreshments, she whispered to him that two passengers, not one, had been killed.

The French government wanted to bring French military personnel into Algeria to safely resolve the hijacking, but the Algerian government would not allow foreign military to land on Algerian soil to resolve an Algerian political crisis. Prime Minister Balladur said that he asked the Algerian government "extremely forcefully and urgently" to give permission for the aircraft to take off. He felt that the French government held responsibility for solving the problem as the aircraft belonged to a French airline and almost a third of the passengers were French.

Seven hours into the hijacking, the cabin was calm but tense; at that point, few of the passengers knew that two people had been killed. It had grown dark outside and the aircraft was surrounded by spotlights. The pilots now attempted to defuse the situation by talking to the hijackers and trying to gain their trust. Dhellemme explained that the beginning of a hijacking is violent, so the role of the pilot is to keep the participants calm, "buy time", show the hijackers who the crew are as people, and find out details about the hijackers; then the pilot has to try gaining the trust of the hijackers.

During the night, Spanish authorities allowed the French military to send its forces to Mallorca, Spain, which was as close to Algeria as was possible without being accused of interfering in the situation. At 8:00 p.m., GIGN operatives boarded an Airbus A300 aircraft similar to F-GBEC, the hijacked plane, at a military base in France. En route to Mallorca, the GIGN operatives were able to familiarise themselves with the A300 in preparation for storming the aircraft. After the GIGN's plane arrived at Palma de Mallorca Airport, the Algerian government made it clear that French forces were not welcome in Algeria.

=== 25 December ===
Captain Dhellemme made a tour of the cabin at about 2 o'clock the next morning to check on the situation; he said that the cabin was "calm" during that time. He noticed two of the hijackers asleep on the floor. In the morning, French prime minister Édouard Balladur flew to Paris.

New information arrived at the Consulate General of France in Oran, Algeria, via a mole in the GIA:

We received this information directly from members of the Algerian secret service. And this information was very worrying. The terrorists' true aim was to crash the plane in Paris.

— French minister for the interior Charles Pasqua

Police confirmed this plan after a raid on a safe house.

The hijackers released some of the passengers, mainly women with young children and those with severe medical conditions. Over 170 people still remained on board the plane. The hijackers offered to release the remaining Algerian passengers, but the Algerians refused to leave the aircraft. Dhellemme recalled that one passenger who was refusing to leave said that he thought the crew would be killed if he did, and Dhellemme believes that the passengers' motives were sincere. By the end of 25 December, the hijackers had freed a total of 63 passengers.

When the Algerian police managed to identify Yahia via night vision devices, the French government sent Yahia's mother to plead for him to release the passengers, in the hope that she could persuade her son to give in, but the tactic backfired. One passenger, Kakachi, recalled Yahia becoming enraged by this move. At this point, the hijackers began targeting the French passengers; there were two staff members of the French Embassy in Algiers on board the flight, a secretary and a chef. The hijackers forced the chef, Yannick Beugnet, to plead into the microphone. Through Beugnet, they demanded that unless the Algerian government cleared the A300 for takeoff before 9:30 p.m., they would kill one passenger every 30 minutes, starting with Beugnet. They threatened to shoot him and throw him out of the door. The Algerian passengers assured him that the hijackers were bluffing while the French passengers were demanding that the aircraft be allowed to take off. When the 9:30 p.m. deadline passed, the hijackers shot Beugnet and threw his body outside. The door open warning light in the cockpit indicated to the pilots that another passenger had been murdered. Air France knew that the chef had been murdered as it was listening in on the conversations between the aircraft and the control tower. Philippe Legorjus, a former Air France security adviser, said in an interview that the airline employees "lived through [the event] with great emotion." Zahida Kakachi said Lotfi was calmly trying to convert her and another stewardess to Islam, though Kakachi was only pretending so that she would not enrage him.

The French government were informed of the events. Balladur spoke on the telephone to Algeria's prime minister Mokdad Sifi; he told him that the French government would hold the Algerian government responsible for the outcome if it did not authorise them to intervene in the situation. Just before midnight, Balladur told the president of Algeria, Liamine Zéroual, that France was ready to receive the Air France flight. As a result of Balladur's demands, 39 hours after the start of the hijacking, Zéroual allowed the aircraft to leave Algiers. Flight attendant Claude Burgniard recalled that everyone was relieved when the aircraft departed because they thought the crisis was over.

There was not enough fuel on board the plane to reach Paris, because the auxiliary power unit had been running since the hijackers took over the plane, so a refuelling stop was scheduled at Marseille Provence Airport. Dhellemme confronted Yahia to find out whether he planned to blow up the aircraft between Algiers and Marseille. Yahia insisted that the plane would fly to Marseille, take on fuel, then fly to Paris for the press conference; reassured, Dhellemme prepared for takeoff. In an interview, Dhellemme suggested that the hijackers would probably have said this anyway to prevent the crew from taking action against them. Burgniard recalled that the hijackers, in the cockpit, seemed excited and "like kids".

=== 26 December ===
The aircraft approached Marseille during the early hours of 26 December. The hijackers did not know that Major Denis Favier's GIGN squad was already in Marseille, having flown from Mallorca to a military base near Marseille, and planned to storm the aircraft while it was in Marseille. The GIGN squad practised entering the A300 before Flight 8969 arrived in Marseille. Favier explained in an interview that the hijackers were arriving in friendly territory, and the power difference would be a key element in the struggle. Flight 8969 landed at 3:33 a.m.

Steward Claude Burgniard said that the hijackers felt that the landing in Marseille was a "magic moment" as they had arrived in France. Burgniard recalled that the airport was dark and that she only saw the lights of the A300 and a car that the A300 followed. The French authorities deliberately led the aircraft away from the terminal and into a remote corner of the airport. By 26 December, the French government had received information stating that the hijackers had planned to attack Paris. Favier planned to appear conciliatory and prolong the negotiations as long as possible. He believed that the hijackers were tired, so he planned to wear them down. Alain Gehin, the chief of police of Marseille, spoke to the group of hijackers in the control tower. Gehin implemented Favier's strategy.

While using Dhellemme to speak for them, the hijackers asked for 27 tons of fuel; the aircraft needed approximately 9 tons to fly to Paris from Marseille. The request indicated to the French authorities that the aircraft was going to be used as a firebomb or going to fly to an Islamic country sympathetic to the hijackers' cause. Hours later, the authorities received word of the firebomb plot. Passengers who were released in Algiers stated that the A300 had been rigged with explosives. Demolition experts determined that the plane was likely rigged in a way that would cause it to explode. Charles Pasqua said in an interview that the French government had decided that the aircraft was not going to leave Marseille, regardless of the consequences.

At around 8:00 a.m., the hijackers demanded that the forces let the aircraft take off by 9:40 a.m. The negotiators delayed the ultimatum by giving the aircraft additional food and water, emptying the toilet tanks, and providing vacuum cleaners. The GIGN operatives servicing the aircraft were disguised as airport personnel. They discovered the aircraft doors were not blocked or booby trapped. The men planted eavesdropping devices while others trained long-range "cannon" microphones on the A300's fuselage and windows. Favier's group asked the hijackers if they would rather do a press conference in Marseille instead of Paris, since all of the major media outlets had offices in Marseille. The hijackers agreed to hold a press conference on the A300. The negotiators requested that the front of the aircraft be cleared for the press conference. This was to create an area for the GIGN during the storming of the aircraft. Favier explained in an interview that the press conference was an important tactic as it allowed the passengers to be moved to the rear of the aircraft. The hijackers did not realise that the doors of the A300 could be opened from the outside.

Twelve hours after the A300 arrived at Marseille, the GIGN knew how many hijackers were on board and their location on the aircraft with the help of eavesdropping devices, infrared vision equipment, and "cannon" microphones. It intended to wait until sunset to take advantage of the darkness. The occupants of the aircraft were unaware of the GIGN's true motives, and the militants were confused about why the press had not yet arrived. Yahia, frustrated by the absence of the press and sensing the authorities were up to something, ordered the pilot to move the aircraft. Dhellemme parked the aircraft at the foot of the airport control tower and in close proximity to the terminal and other aircraft. An explosion in this position would result in many more casualties than in the earlier, remote location.

This was a tactical disadvantage for the GIGN; the positions were based on the aircraft being parked where the French authorities ordered the placement of the A300. When the aircraft moved, the GIGN had to quickly reorganise its forces. Favier placed snipers on the roof so they would have a view of the cockpit. He organised a group of thirty men with three passenger boarding stairs to rush the aircraft and take it over. Favier planned to have two teams, each with 11 people, open the rear left and rear right doors of the A300. A third team of eight would open the front right door. The forces planned to isolate the cockpit, with Yahia, from the rest of the aircraft.

By 5:00 p.m., the authorities had not delivered any amount of fuel to the A300. Yahia entered the cabin to choose a fourth person to kill. He selected the youngest member of the Air France crew, who had told the hijackers that he was an atheist. Passengers said that Yahia seemed reluctant to kill a fourth passenger at that point. Burgniard stated in an interview that she did not know whether Yahia had decided not to execute the crew member; she knew that he kept delaying the execution. Instead, the hijackers opened the door and fired around the aircraft. Zahida Kakachi, a passenger, recalled that the hijackers began reciting verses from the Quran on the public address system. The verses were prayers for the dead. According to Kakachi, the passengers were silent and began to feel panicked. The hijackers knew the negotiators were in the control tower, so through the side window of the cockpit, they began to fire automatic machine guns towards the control tower. Philippe Legorjus, who at the time was the airline's security adviser, recalled that glass shattered all around the negotiators. Captain Dhellemme said that throughout the time in Marseille, there had been tension, but "nothing like what seemed to be about to happen". Balladur allowed Favier to take whatever actions he felt were necessary; after the hijackers fired at the control tower, Favier decided to begin the raid.

== Raid ==
Raid on Air France Flight 8969
- Part of the Algerian Civil War
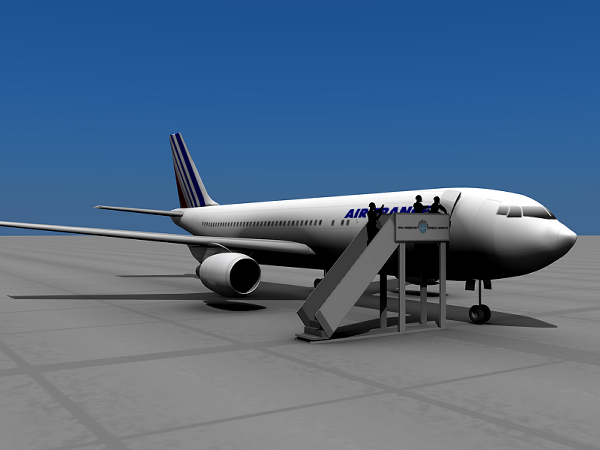
- Illustration of the early stages of the GIGN assault
Date	26 December 1994
Location	Marseille, France
Result	GIGN victory

Belligerents
(France) GIGN	GIA

Commanders and leaders
(France) Major Denis Favier	Abdul Abdullah Yahia †

Strength
30 GIGN operators	4 hijackers

Casualties and losses
9 wounded	All killed
- 3 passengers were already dead prior to the raid; 13 passengers wounded; 3 crew wounded

Once the hijackers noticed the boarding stairs moving towards them, they recognised the imminent assault. Through the cockpit window, a hijacker fired upon the stairs containing the forward GIGN team. As the first stairs reached the front starboard (right) door, it became apparent that it was elevated too high relative to the door frame for a uniform entry into the aircraft. The GIGN had trained on an empty aircraft, in which the suspension system of the plane was not as compressed, leading to an overestimation of the necessary height of the boarding stairs. After a short delay in repositioning the stairs, GIGN forces were able to enter. The hijackers returned fire, attacking the GIGN forces. One hijacker was killed instantly. Then, the two other units entered the rear of the aircraft. The participants fired hundreds of bullets. The hijackers fired through the skin of the aircraft. Grenades erupted and smoke went through the cabin. The GIGN's stun grenades temporarily blinded and deafened occupants, allowing the GIGN to storm the aircraft. One of the hijackers' homemade grenades detonated, causing limited damage. The snipers on the tower could not initially get a clear shot into the aircraft as the copilot, Jean-Paul Borderie, blocked their view. Moments later, Borderie pulled himself out of the cockpit window and dropped to the ground. With the view unobstructed, the snipers began firing into the cockpit, while the GIGN evacuated passengers in the rear of the aircraft.

Flight attendant Claude Burgniard described the firefight as "the apocalypse". Christophe Morin, a flight attendant, recalled that the GIGN ordered passengers and crew to get down as low as possible with their hands over their heads, hide, and then to not move. Morin described the situation as "violent". He recalled putting his overcoat over his head so he would not see the tracer bullets and other occurrences during the raid. Morin said that he tried to help a female passenger next to him escape, but she was too large and Morin was unable to move her, so the two held hands. Pilot Bernard Dhellemme said that he was in "a rather bad spot", so he crouched and made himself "as small as possible".

GIGN Gendarme Thierry Prungnaud was among the team that commenced the raid, often credited as "Hero of the Marignane". He was the second to enter the Airbus, as a teammate covered his push. The first shot from his Manurhin MR73 six-shot revolver immediately killed one terrorist, followed by a second burst that killed another terrorist and injured one. The fourth terrorist fired a burst of seven shots. One shot struck Prungnaud's visor, three into his arm, and two into his bullet-proof vest. Prungnaud's injuries caused him to collapse backwards, where he noticed a hand grenade next to him. Prungnaud successfully blocked a majority of the blast by turning the back of his bullet-proof vest towards the grenade, though his body was riddled with shrapnel. “I entered the Airbus second because a teammate was covering me. I killed two terrorists and wounded a third before the fourth, hidden in the cockpit, fired a burst of seven bullets at me, one of which hit me near the visor of my helmet. It completely stunned me; I collapsed. Then I saw a grenade land next to me. I managed to turn onto my side. My vest protected my back, but the rest of my body was riddled with shrapnel. It hurt terribly!” he recalled painfully. For about 20 minutes while the gunfight occurred, Prungnaud was trapped on the floor due to an inability for extraction. He was later rushed to a nearby hospital in Marseille, where doctors saved his life.

A few minutes after the beginning of the assault, most of the passengers had escaped. At that point, three of the four hijackers were fatally shot. Dhellemme recalled that the cockpit only had himself, the flight engineer, and the last hijacker. Dhellemme said that the hijacker could have killed him and his colleagues out of spite, but did not. In an interview, Denis Favier explained that there likely was a mutual recognition and "respect" between the hijackers and the hostages. He believes the bonds between the hijackers and hostages helped save lives of passengers and crew in the conflict.

GIGN commando Philippe Bardelli was leading a column up the front right stairs, as that team was tasked with throwing stun grenades in the cockpit, when a 7.62×39mm bullet from an AK-47 hit his drawn pistol and detonated the cartridges; Bardelli later remarked that his pistol thereby saved his life, since such AK-47 rounds were able to penetrate the GIGN's helmet visors. The remaining hijacker kept the GIGN at bay for 20 minutes, but he eventually ran out of ammunition and died from a gunshot wound. Meanwhile, the GIGN operatives were not sure which men were the hijackers and how many were still alive, so they considered all male passengers as potentially being hijackers. The flight engineer, Alain Bossuat, radioed the tower stating that the hijackers were dead and that there were no more left. This signaled to GIGN forces that a final clearing of the A300 could begin. Dhellemme said that when the forces entered the aircraft, they ordered him to put his hands on his head. Dhellemme said that, after the hijacking ordeal had run its course, he refused to leave with his hands on his head and be "punished like a child". Burgniard said that when she saw Bossuat handcuffed, the cabin crew told the forces to let him go as the individual was the flight engineer. At 5:35 p.m., Favier radioed to the tower that the incident was over; the incident had unfolded over 54 hours.

All of the hijackers had been killed. The remaining passengers and crew survived the 20-minute gun battle. (Note: Sources differ on the number of passengers present. Tom Sancton of Time magazine stated that there were initially 227 passengers, while Peter Taylor of the BBC reported that there were 220 passengers and 12 crew members on board. Of those freed at the end of the assault, Sancton claimed that there were 173 passengers and crew, while Taylor's figures indicate 166 people (154 passengers and 12 crew). Both sources agreed that 63 Algerians were freed.Aviation Safety Network indicates 163 remaining alive (170 occupants with 7 fatalities) at 17:00 on 26 December 1994.) Of the remaining passengers, 13 received minor injuries. Nine of the 30 GIGN operatives received injuries; of them, one received serious wounds. Three crew members received injuries. Dhellemme was hit by bullets in his right elbow and thigh. Bossuat received minor injuries; the dead bodies of two hijackers had shielded Dhellemme and Bossuat from gunfire. Borderie, the most seriously injured, fractured his elbow and thigh from the 5-metre (16 ft) drop. Favier said that he determined that the operation was a success since none of the GIGN received fatal injuries. French prime minister Édouard Balladur said that the events unfolded "exceptionally well".

== Aftermath ==
As a result of the damage to the aircraft, the A300 was written off and later scrapped at the airport in September 1995. Several hours after the incident ended, the Armed Islamic Group, which had claimed responsibility for the event, killed four Roman Catholic priests in retaliation in Tizi-Ouzou, Algeria. Three of the priests were French, while one was Belgian.

The crew of the A300 and the GIGN forces received high national honours. Charles Pasqua, then the minister for the interior, said that throughout the ordeal the crew "rose to the occasion". Bernard Dhellemme returned to flying and worked for Air France for nine years before retiring. Flight attendant Claude Burgniard said that she "kept seeing the faces" of the three passengers who had been executed; when she received her medal she realised that she had helped save 173 people; this allowed her to mourn and get over the incident. Burgniard said that she does not wear the medal, but that she felt like she deserved it. Burgniard, who also received a message of thanks from the airline, never again worked for Air France. Flight attendant Christophe Morin stopped working for Air France and began to work for a charitable organisation.

A former militant group leader admitted that the men had planned to detonate the aircraft over the Eiffel Tower. The militant group never again attempted this plot. Pasqua said that if the militants crashed an aircraft on the Eiffel Tower or the Élysée Palace, they would have committed what they would believe to be "an extraordinary feat."

Flights between Algiers and Paris are now Flights 1355, 1451, 1555, 1755, and 1855 (operating to Charles de Gaulle instead of Orly).

== Passengers and crew ==
Most of the passengers were Algerians; 138 of the passengers were Algerian citizens. A significant number of the passengers were French people leaving Algeria. Captain Bernard Dhellemme said that the hijackers, who had extensively planned the operation, did not anticipate that most of the passengers would be Algerians. The hijackers recited Quran verses and tried to reassure the Algerian passengers. Witness accounts said that they terrorised non-Algerians.

Nationality	Passengers	Crew	Total
Algeria	100	-	100
France	75	12	87
Germany	10	-	10
Ireland	5	-	5
Netherlands	3	-	3
Norway	5	-	5
United Kingdom	5	-	5
United States	5	-	5
Vietnam	1	-	1
Iran	7	-	7
Tajikistan	5	-	5
Turkey	4	-	4
Total	224	12	236

== Hijackers ==
25-year-old Abdul Abdullah Yahia, also known as "The Emir", was a greengrocer from the Bab El Oued neighbourhood of Algiers who began criminal life as a petty thief. By the time of the hijacking, he was notorious for beheading Algerian policemen. The negotiators said that Yahia spoke "approximate" French and always ended his sentences in "Insha'Allah" ("God willing"). Several passengers said all but one of the hijackers had no beards and closely cropped hair. A woman said that the men "were polite and correct" and that they "had the determined air of cold-blooded killers". Another passenger said the hijackers "seemed excited, very euphoric" and that they told the occupants that they would teach the French and the world a lesson and show what they were capable of doing.

As the hijacking progressed, the passengers recognised the personalities of the hijackers. Claude Burgniard, a flight attendant, recalled that the crew and passengers gave nicknames to the hijackers "to make things simpler". Yahia, the leader, had given his name, so the passengers called him by that name. According to Burgniard, Lotfi had a "peculiar" character, "was always on a knife edge", and "the most fanatic" and "the most fundamentalist" of the hijackers. Therefore, he received the nickname "Madman" from the passengers. According to Burgniard, Lotfi was the hijacker who insisted that the passengers follow Islamic law. Lotfi found women having their heads uncovered "intolerable", making him very angry. One hijacker did not give his name to the passengers, so they called him "Bill". Burgniard stated that Bill was "a little bit simple" and "more of a goatherd than a terrorist." She said his role as a hijacker was "an error in casting". Burgniard remembered that the occupants wondered why Bill was there and that they saw Bill appearing as if he wondered why he was there, as well. The hijacker nicknamed "The Killer" shot the hostages whom the hijackers had targeted.

== In popular culture ==
The events of Flight 8969 were featured in "The Killing Machine", a Season 2 episode of the Canadian TV series Mayday, with the episode using a mix of re-enactments and actual footage. Flight 8969 captain Bernard Dhellemme and Colonel Denis Favier, then a major who headed the GIGN and led the assault, gave their first television interviews for Mayday; both appearing in silhouette to keep their identities secret. It was common public assumption that the militants were offering a reward for Favier's assassination, but maintaining the anonymity of GIGN operatives was standard practice.

Flight attendant Christophe Morin and passenger Zahida Kakachi co-authored the book Le vol Alger-Marseille: Journal d'otages, recalling the events of the attack and how it had affected their lives.

A one-hour documentary, episode 3 of the UK BBC Two television series The Age of Terror, aired on 29 April 2008. This showed an in-depth reconstruction of the hijacking, and included interviews with passengers, crew, and GIGN commandos. It was revealed that a mole within the GIA organization informed the French authorities that the group's intention was to cause the aircraft to crash in Paris; they could thus not let it take off from Marseille regardless of the hijackers' demands.

The 2011 French film The Assault, directed by Julien Leclercq, based on the book L'Assaut: GIGN, Marignane, 26 décembre 1994, 17 h 12 by Roland Môntins, depicts the events of Flight 8969. It was reportedly made in collaboration with, and with advices from, the GIGN.

== See also ==
- Federal Express Flight 705, another hijacking in 1994; foiled by flight crew
- Garuda Indonesia Flight 206, another similar hijacking in 1981
- List of terrorist incidents in France
- Lufthansa Flight 181, a similar hijack and rescue incident in 1977
- Singapore Airlines Flight 117, similar hijacking which resulted in a storming of the aircraft in 1991
- United Airlines Flight 93, hijacked by members of al-Qaeda on September 11, 2001 with a plot to crash the plane into an unknown target; foiled following a passenger revolt
- Air France Flight 139, another Air France hijacking involving an Airbus A300
