= Médaille de la Gendarmerie nationale =

- Obvserse of the Medal bearing the now defunct grenade device
- Type: State decoration
- Awarded for: Courage
- Presented by: France
- Status: Active
- Established: 5 September 1949
- Ribbon bar without device

Precedence
- Next (higher): Croix de la Valeur militaire
- Next (lower): Medal for the War Wounded

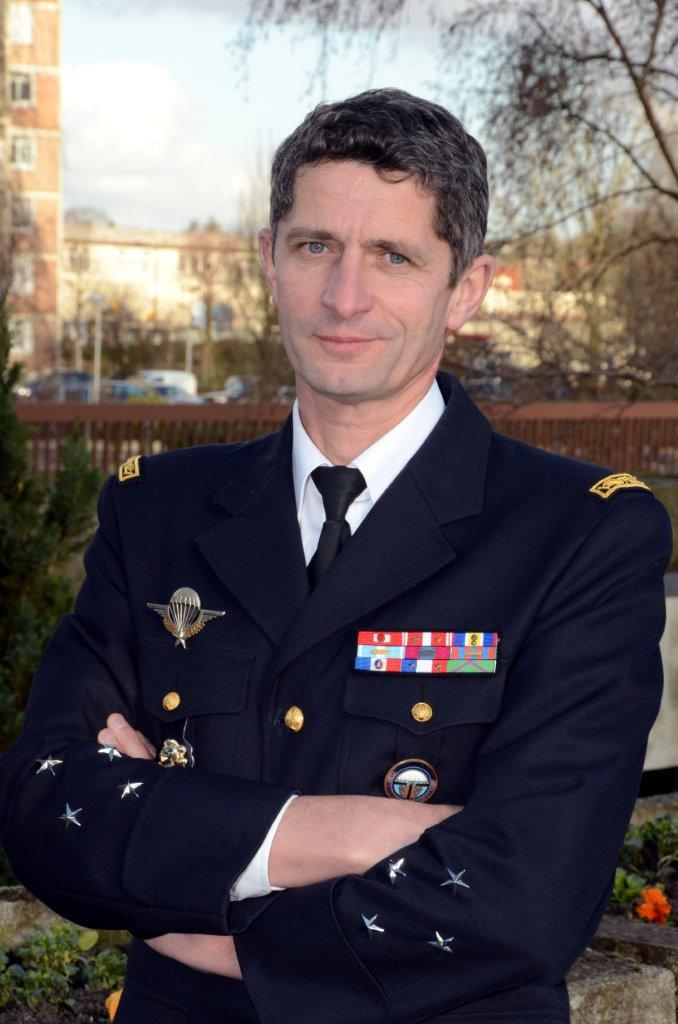
General Denis Favier, a recipient of the Médaille de la Gendarmerie nationale with grenade device

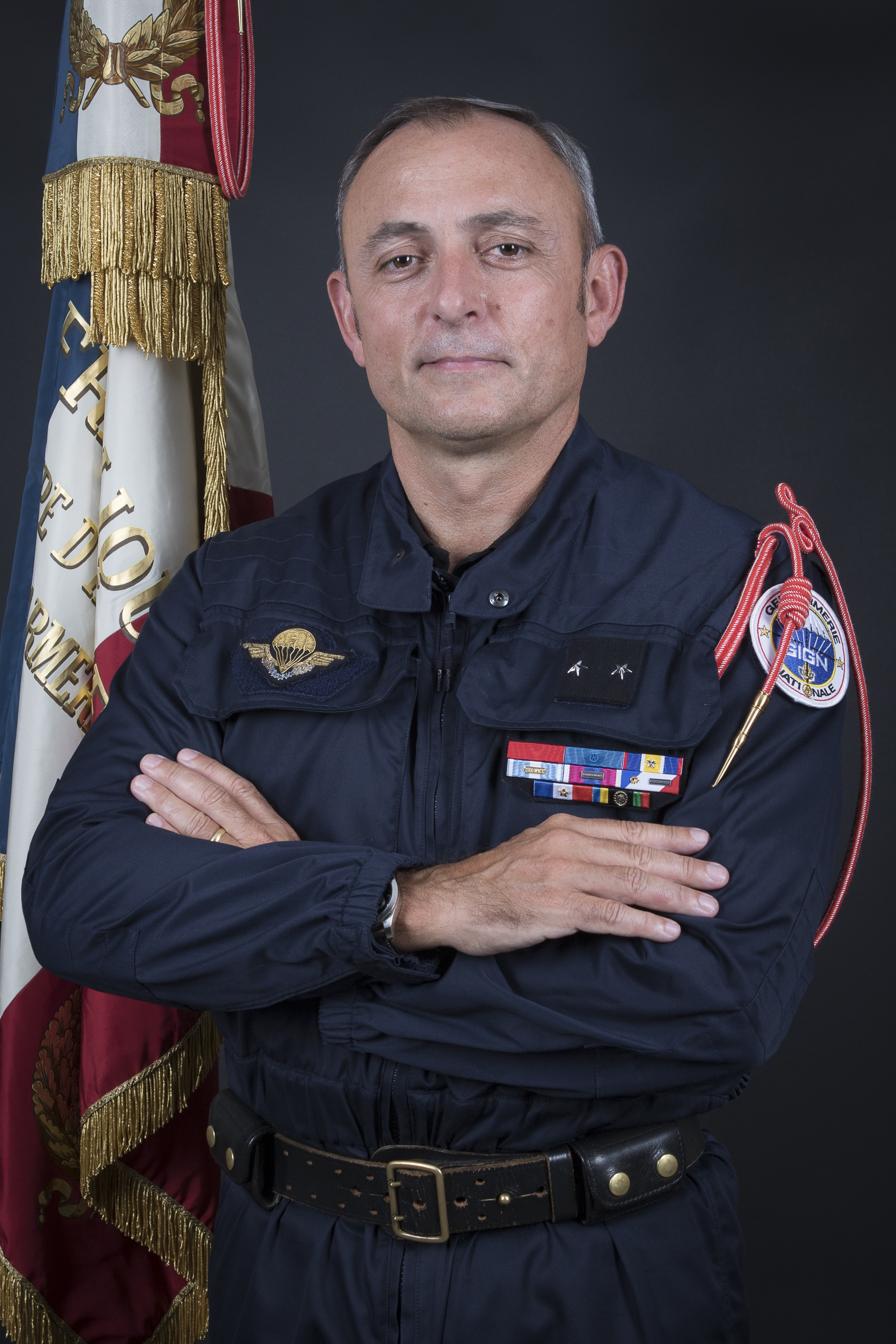
General Hubert Bonneau, a recipient of the Médaille de la Gendarmerie nationale with silver star device

The Médaille de la Gendarmerie nationale (English: Medal of the National Gendarmerie or Federal Police) is a French military decoration created on 5 September 1949 on proposition of the then Minister of Defence, mister Paul Ramadier. It was originally created in a single grade for award to officiers and NCOs of the Gendarmerie nationale who were cited in the orders of the entire service. Such a citation in the orders of the entire service, and all potential subsequent ones would be denoted by a grenade device on the ribbon as the medal could, and can still only be awarded once to any potential recipient. The medal could also be exceptionally awarded to persons not members of the service for important services rendered to the gendarmerie or for help during special missions. These presentations were made without a citation and thus without any ribbon device.

The medal's statute remained unchanged until a recent 2004 review as detailed below.

== Award statute ==
The Médaille de la Gendarmerie nationale is awarded by the Minister of Defence of the French Republic on proposition of the director of the Gendarmerie nationale to officers, NCOs and the military rank and file of the Gendarmerie nationale who distinguished themselves by a brilliant action which required special qualities of courage and self-sacrifice, accomplished on duty maintaining law and order.

It may also be exceptionally awarded to:

- military members of the gendarmerie, for remarkable activities or work which led to a decisive impetus to the service;
- persons not belonging to the gendarmerie who have rendered important services to the latter or who, through their particularly meritorious assistance in the course of missions, have earned its gratitude.

The ribbon of the medal will be adorned by a device denoting the degree of the award as described in its accompanying citation:

- Bronze palm when cited to the entire service;
- Gilt star when cited to its relevant army corps;
- Silver star when cited to its relevant division;
- Bronze star when cited to its relevant brigade or division.

The medal may be awarded posthumously.

Medals awarded prior to the 2004 decree and bearing the now defunct grenade device will have the latter replaced by an army corps level gilt star.

No retroactive award for actions prior to the medals' creation will be made.

== Award description ==
The Médaille de la Gendarmerie nationale is a 36 mm in diameter circular gilt bronze medal. At its top, also in gilt bronze and hiding the ribbon suspension loop, is affixed a grenade with flames between laurel leaves. The obverse bears the relief image of a plumed close helmet resting on a sword pointing upward, it bears the circular inscription along its circumference "GENDARMERIE NATIONALE". The reverse bears a laurel wreath with the relief inscription "COURAGE DISCIPLINE" on two lines at the top, the center being reserved for the inscription of the recipient's name.

The Médaille de la Gendarmerie nationale is suspended by a 37 mm wide silk moiré ribbon divided by vertical stripes in the following colours:

- 10 mm wide yellow central stripe representing the colour of the old Maréchaussée, the military service charged with police and jurisdictional duties under the old regime;
- 2 mm wide white stripes bordering the central stripe, they represent the two subdivisions of the service, the police service and the Republican Guard;
- these central stripes are themselves bordered by 9,5 mm wide blue vertical stripes representing the colour of the police service;
- 2 mm wide bright red edge stripes represent the Republican Guard.

== Notable recipients (partial list) ==
- General Denis Favier
- General Jacques Mignaux
- General Thierry Orosco
- Commandant (major) Christian Prouteau
- Captain Paul Barril
- Chief Warrant-officer Thierry Prungnaud
- Chief Warrant-officer Hubert Clément
- General Guy Parayre
- General Hubert Bonneau
- General Roland Gilles

== See also ==
- National Gendarmerie
- Republican Guard
- French Armed Forces
- Ribbons of the French military and civil awards
