= Cross for Military Valour =

French military decoration

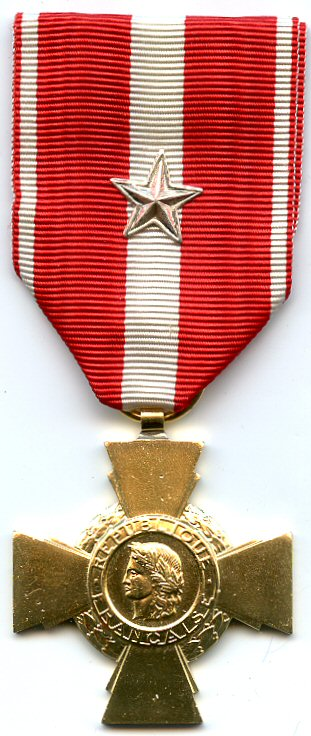
- Cross for Military Valour (obverse) with one silver-gilt star
- Type: Bravery award (four class decoration); Four degrees: Cross for Military Valour with Bronze Palm; Cross for Military Valour with Gold Star; Cross for Military Valour with Silver Star; Cross for Military Valour with Bronze Star
- Awarded for: Valour or gallantry in combat
- Presented by: France
- Eligibility: Members of the French Armed Forces
- Status: Active
- Established: April 11, 1956
- First award: 1956
- Ribbon de la Croix de la Valeur militaire

Precedence
- Next (higher): Croix de guerre des TOE
- Next (lower): Médaille de la Gendarmerie nationale
- Related: Croix du combattant

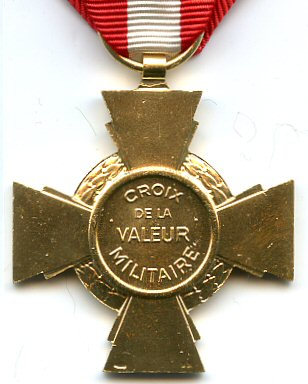
Reverse of the Cross

The Cross for Military Valour (French: Croix de la Valeur Militaire) is a military decoration of France. It recognizes an individual bestowed a Mention in Dispatches earned for showing valour in presence of an enemy, in theatres of operations which are not subject to the award of the Croix de guerre des théâtres d'opérations extérieures (Cross of War for Foreign Theatres of Operations). The Cross for Military Valour is usually awarded for security or peacekeeping operations, always outside the French territory.

== History ==
It was established in 1956 to reward soldiers, sailors, and airmen serving in Algeria who had committed acts of valour or gallantry in combat. Algeria was a department of France at the time, so it was not considered a declared war but peacekeeping operations on French soil. Therefore, the War Cross for foreign operational theatres, which had been awarded for valiant service in Indochina, was not considered appropriate. Médaille de la Valeur Militaire was created on 11 April 1956 with a four-grade system of distinctions. To put it on the same level as the Croix de guerre, the Medal was replaced by a Cross on 12 October 1956.

The Cross was used extensively to reward soldiers for valour in every French military operations since 1956, except the Gulf War and the Kosovo War, when Overseas War Crosses were awarded in place of Crosses for Military Valour :

- Aden Gulf (April 4 and 5, 2015)
- Afghanistan (November, 2001 – a date to be determined)
- Algeria (from 31 October 1954 to 1962)
- Antilles (from 16 April 2005 to 15 June 2005).
- Burkina Faso, Mali, Mauritania, Niger and Tchad (Operation Barkhane, from 1 October 2014 to present and MINUSMA from 1 August 2013 to present).
- Cape Verde (On 13–14 June 2002)
- Central African Republic (from 18 November 2006 to 7 December 2006; 2 March 2007)
- Chad (1968; 28 January 2008)
- Congo (service in 1960?) | Zaïre (service in 1978?) | Democratic Republic of the Congo (from 2 June to 26 September 2003)
- Haiti (from 19 February 2004 to 30 June 2004)
- Iraq and Syria (Opération Chammal; from 8 August 2014 to present)
- Ivory Coast (Opération Licorne from 19 September 2002. to December 31, 2014)
- Lebanon (from 9 January 2005 to 16 July 2006)
- Liberia (9–10 June 2003)
- Libya (Opération Harmattan from 22 February 2011 to present).
- Mauritania (from 10 January 1957 to November 1960)
- Morocco (from 1 January 1953 to 1956).
- Sénégal, Burkina Faso, Mauritanie, Mali and Niger (Opération Serval, from 11 January 2013).
- Tunisia (from 1 June 1953 to 1956)

== Grades of distinction ==
The grades of the Cross are insignia of a mention in dispatches, which can be of one of five levels matching the valour displayed by the recipient while in presence of an enemy. They are each named after a historical formation of the French military.

Insignia	Level					
Insignia	Air Force (Armée de l'Air)	Army (Armée de Terre)	Gendarmerie Nationale	Navy (Marine nationale)		
Insignia	Air Force (Armée de l'Air)	Army (Armée de Terre)	Gendarmerie Nationale	Surface units	Aviation units	Submarines
Bronze Palm (Five bronze palms can be substituted by a single silver palm)	Air Force (armée aérienne)	Army (armée)	Gendarmerie	Navy (marine nationale)		
Silver-Gilt Star	Air Corps (corps aérien)	Corps (corps d'armée)		Task Force (force maritime)		
Silver Star	Air Division (division aérienne)	Division		Squadron (escadre)	Flotilla	
Bronze Star	Air Brigade (brigade aérienne)	Brigade		Division (division de bâtiments)	Air group (groupe aérien)	Submarine squad (escadrille de sous-marins)
Bronze Star	Air Wing (escadre aérienne)	Regiment		Navy Unit (unité de la marine)		

== Eligibility and awarding process ==
The 1956 Cross was meant principally for soldiers, but a provision was made for civilians participating in a peacekeeping operation. On 2 December 2005 this provision was amended in order to reward only civilian employees of the Ministry of Defence on official missions overseas. Originally, the cross was not awarded to members of foreign militaries or governments. This restriction was lifted on 9 November 2011 for acts of valour or performed valiant service while on joint operations with French forces. Collective awards can be made to military units, both French and foreign, since 2011. When a unit has decorated twice with the Cross at its highest level, the fourragère can be worn on uniforms.

The four first grades of the Cross can be awarded by Chef d'état-major des Armées (Chairman of the Joint Chiefs of Staff), but the Cross with Palm decoration is only awarded by the Ministre de la Défense (Minister of Defence).

== Award description ==
Medal: suspended from a ribbon is a 36 mm bronze cross, with an effigy of the Republic crowned with a wreath, with the edge embossed: "REPUBLIQUE FRANCAISE". On the reverse is the inscription: "Croix de la Valeur militaire".

Ribbon: a red bar with three vertical white bands: a centered 7 mm band, with a smaller 2 mm band on each end.

== Recipient units (partial list) ==
- Frigate Jean de Vienne (D643)
- Police Mobile Armoured Group (GBGM)
- 17th Parachute Engineer Regiment
- 126th Infantry Regiment
- 1st Parachute Chasseur Regiment
- 1st Marine Infantry Parachute Regiment
- 3rd Combat helicopter regiment
- 152nd Infantry Regiment
- 2nd Foreign Legion Parachute Regiment
- 12th Cuirassier Regiment
- 35th Parachute Artillery Regiment
- 2nd Marine Infantry Regiment
- 3rd Marine Infantry Parachute Regiment
- 4th Special Forces Helicopter Regiment
- 13th Parachute Dragoon Regiment
- 2nd Foreign Legion Engineer Regiment
- Escadron de Chasse 01-007 "Provence"
- 2/4 La Fayette Fighter Squadron
- Frigate Courbet (F 712)
- 40th Artillery Regiment
- 1st Parachute Hussar Regiment
- 1st Foreign Legion Cavalry Regiment
- 2/61 Franche-Comté Transport Squadron
- 6th Engineers Regiment
- 2nd Foreign Legion Infantry Regiment
- National Gendarmerie Intervention Group
