= Denis Favier =

French military officer (born 1959)

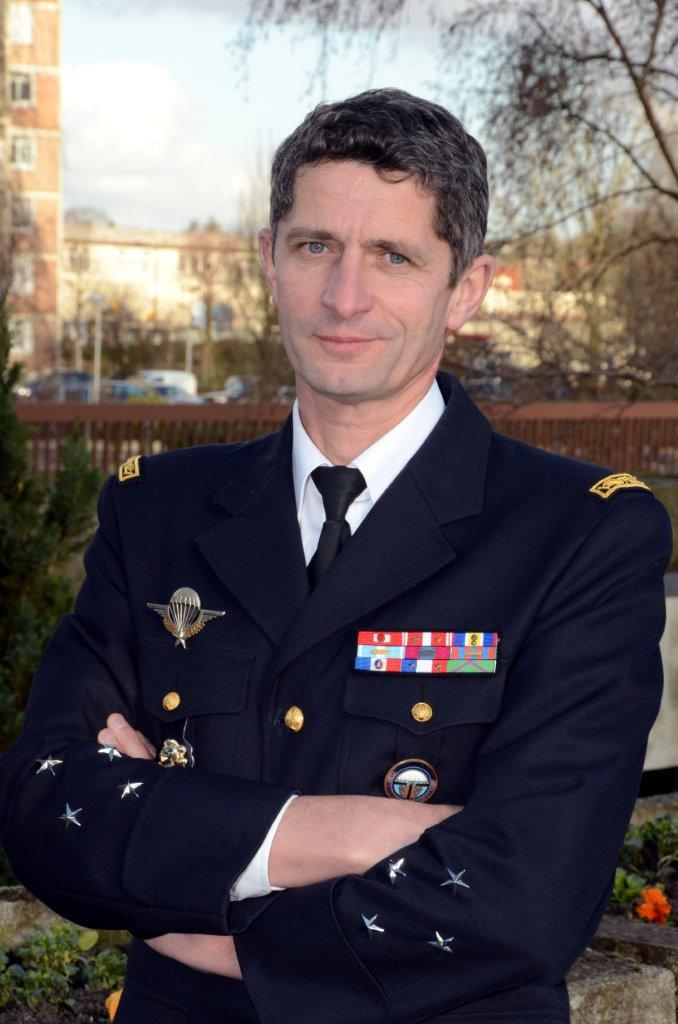
- Favier in 2012
- Born: 18 May 1959 (age 67); Lons-le-Saunier
- Allegiance: France

Denis Favier (born 18 May 1959) is a French officer known for commanding the mission to remove hijackers from Air France Flight 8969. From 2013 to 2016, he was the General-Director of the French Gendarmerie.

Favier was born on 18 May 1959 in Lons-le-Saunier. In 1979, he joined the military academy of Saint-Cyr. In 1992, he was appointed commander of the National Gendarmerie Intervention Group (GIGN). In 1994, he was promoted to chef d'escadron (major). In 1994, he commanded the assault against the Armed Islamic Group of Algeria, who had earlier taken the passengers of Air France Flight 8969 hostage. Following this incident, he gave interviews in silhouette or facial obscurity, which he still does until today as it was believed that the co-militants of the terrorists his team killed offered a reward for his assassination. In 2007, after various positions in the Gendarmerie, he was again appointed commander of the GIGN, which underwent restructuring. In 2008, he joined the French forces leading the assault on the pirates who had captured the ship Ponant near Somalia. In 2008, he was promoted to a general. In 2013, he was appointed director-general of the Gendarmerie. On 9 January 2015, he led the operation to arrest Chérif and Saïd Kouachi following a hostage situation in Dammartin-en-Goële. The Kouachi brothers were suspected of being the perpetrators of the shooting at Paris newspaper Charlie Hebdo on 7 January 2015.

== Awards and decorations ==
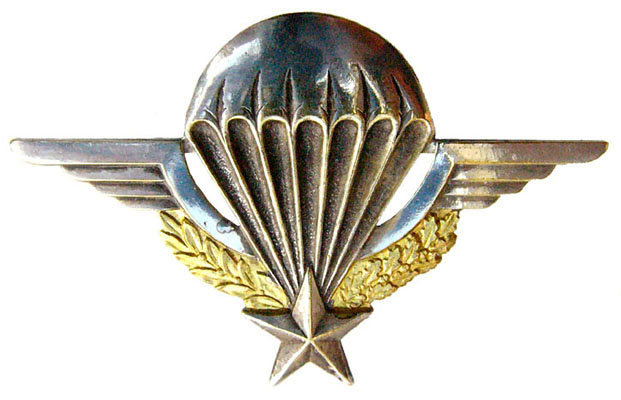

=== Titles ===
- Grand Officer of the Legion of Honor (2015)
- Citation to the Order of the Army with Cross of Military Valor (1995)
- Citation to the order of the regiment with cross of military valor (2009)
- Medal of the National Gendarmerie with bronze grenade (2003)
- Overseas Medal “Lebanon” - Vermeil (2010)
- National Defense Medal - Bronze level (1988)
- French commemorative medal - clip ex-Yugoslavia (2005)
- Medal of Honor for Act of Courage and Dedication - Gold
- Medal of Honor for Act of Courage and Dedication - 1st Class Silver
- Bronze medal of honor of the prison administration (1993)
- Quote without a simple cross to the order of the Gendarmarie regiment (1992)
- Citation without cross to the order of the Army Corps (2003)
- Officer of the Order of Merit of the Italian Republic (2013)
- Officer of the National Order of Côte d'Ivoire
- Commander of the National Order of the Lion of Senegal
- Grand Cross of the Order of Merit of the Civil Guard (Spain)
- Commander of the Order of Civil Merit (Spain)
