= Medal for internal security =

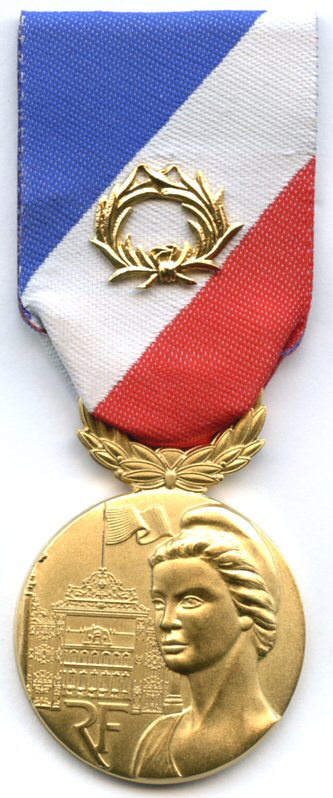
- Medal for internal security in gold (obverse)
- Type: Service medal
- Awarded for: Service in operations under the authority of the Ministry of the Interior
- Country: France
- Presented by: Minister of the Interior
- Clasps: 40 clasps
- Status: Active
- Established: 28 March 2012

Highlights
- Total awarded posthumously: Yes
- Ribbon bar for the bronze medal

The Medal for internal security (French: Médaille de la sécurité intérieure) is a French civil and military medal established by Decree No. 2012-424 of 28 March 2012.

== Description ==
The Medal for internal security is awarded to by the Ministry of the Interior without regard to rank or position and is typically awarded on 1 January and 14 July. However, award may be made at other times for exceptional circumstances. Approved missions may have taken place in France or abroad. Nominations for award of the medal are reviewed by a committee of eight members representing the Minister of the Interior, General Directorate of Local Authorities, General Directorate of National Police, General Directorate of National Gendarmerie, General Directorate for Internal Security, General Directorate of Civil Security and Crisis Management, and the General Secretariat of Immigration and Integration.

The following individuals are eligible for the medal:

- Personnel under the Ministry of the Interior
- Civilian and military personnel, professional or voluntary, placed under the authority of the Ministry of the Interior
- The Municipal Police officers
- Volunteers working in associations for homeland security missions
- Any person, French or foreign, who has distinguished himself or herself by an action relating to internal security.

== Clasps ==
- Secrétariat général
- Administration préfectorale
- Fonction publique territoriale
- Élu
- Police nationale
- Gendarmerie nationale
- Sécurité civile
- Police municipale
- Sécurité routière
- Associations
- Engagement citoyen
- Action humanitaire
- Sapeurs-pompiers
- Direction générale des étrangers en France
- GIPN ^{40e}
- Engagement volontariat 2013
- Philippines 2013
- 70^{e} anniversaire du débarquement
- Cyclone Béjisa 2014
- Accident vol AH 5017 Ouagadougou-Alger
- Suède 2014
- Guinée 2014
- Attentats janvier 2015
- Crash Germanwings
- Népal
- Attentats novembre 2015
- Équateur 2016
- Euro 2016
- Inondations 2016
- Feux de forêt 2016
- Attentats 2016
- Feux de forêt 2017
- Ouragans 2017
- Ouragan Matthew
- Attentats Aude 2018
- Notre-Dame-des-Landes
- Attentat Strasbourg 2018
- Intempéries Aude 2018
- Notre-Dame de Paris
- Engagement des forces de sécurité intérieure 2018-2019
- G7 Biarritz
- 75e anniversaire du débarquement.

== Appearance ==
Bronze	Silver	Gold	Common reverse
