= Carcassonne and Trèbes attack =

2018 Islamist terrorist attack in southern France

- Location: Trèbes and Carcassonne, Aude, France
- Date: 23 March 2018
- Attack type: Hostage-taking, shooting, stabbing, terrorist attack
- Weapons: 7.65mm handgun; Hunting knife; 3 improvised explosive devices
- Deaths: 5 (including the perpetrator)
- Injuries: 15
- Perpetrator: Redouane Lakdim (self-proclaimed Islamic State member)
- Defender: Arnaud Beltrame (gendarmerie officer)
- Motive: Islamic extremism Release of Salah Abdeslam

On 23 March 2018, an Islamic terrorist carried out three attacks in the town of Carcassonne and the nearby village of Trèbes in the Aude department in southwestern France, killing four people and injuring fifteen.

Redouane Lakdim, a 25-year-old French Moroccan, first shot two men at the Aigles de la cité car park overlooking Carcassonne, killing one of them and seriously injuring the other. He then stole the car of the injured victim and drove into Carcassonne, where he opened fire on four police officers who were out jogging, seriously injuring one. He next drove to nearby Trèbes, where he attacked a Super U supermarket, killing an employee and a customer, and taking a female employee hostage. A senior gendarmerie officer, Lieutenant Colonel Arnaud Beltrame, exchanged places with the hostage. During the three-hour stand-off, Lakdim swore allegiance to the Islamic State and demanded the release of Salah Abdeslam, the only surviving suspect of the November 2015 Paris attacks. After Lakdim shot and fatally stabbed Beltrame, a GIGN tactical unit carried out an assault, during which the terrorist was shot and killed.

Islamic State (IS) claimed responsibility for the attack. Beltrame was hailed as a hero and given a state funeral. In January 2024, six men and a woman went on trial in Paris in connection with the attack.

== Background ==
By March 2018, more than 240 people had been killed in Islamist terrorist attacks in France since the Charlie Hebdo shooting in January 2015, and about 20,000 people were on a watchlist of possible extremists. The January 2015 Île-de-France attacks and November 2015 Paris attacks killed a total of 157 people, almost all of them civilians. By 2018, France was the European nation most affected by terrorist attacks inspired or directed by IS. In 2017 the majority of attacks were directed at police and soldiers, rather than civilians.

=== Redouane Lakdim ===
Lakdim was born in Morocco on 11 April 1992 and became a naturalized citizen of France in 2004 when his father acquired French citizenship. By 2018, he was living in Ozanam, a housing estate in Carcassonne, with his parents and sisters.

He was known to the police in Carcassone as a petty criminal and small-time drug dealer. He had been given a suspended prison sentence in 2011 for possession of illegal weapons and had served a month in prison in 2016 for a drug offence and refusing to stop for a traffic control. He had been monitored by the French authorities as a potential security risk (Fiche S) since 2014 but there had been no indication that he was about to commit an attack. His girlfriend, who was a convert to Islam, was also known to French security services.

== Attacks and hostage taking ==
1 Car park overlooking Carcassonne, 1 death
2 Super U in Trèbes, 4 deaths including the perpetrator

On 23 March 2018, Lakdim armed himself with a handgun and a hunting knife before taking his younger sister to school and making his way to the Aigles de la cité car park overlooking Carcassonne. The area was a meeting place for gay men and Lakdim's first attack was motivated by homophobia. Arriving there at about 10:15 a.m., Lakdim first shot Renato Silva, a Portuguese citizen who was smoking a cigarette a little way from his car, and then shot and killed Jean Mazières, a retired wine grower, who was approaching them. He then drove off in Silva's Opel Corsa into Carcassonne where he opened fire on four policemen of the Compagnies Républicaines de Sécurité who were out jogging and just returning to their barracks on avenue général Leclerc. One officer was seriously wounded. Lakdim next drove eight kilometres (5 mi) to Trèbes.

Lakdim arrived at the Super U supermarket in Trèbes at about 10:40 a.m. Immediately upon entering the supermarket, he killed an employee, butcher Christian Medvès, and a customer, Hervé Sosna, a retired mason, shooting both men in the head at point blank range. As customers and staff fled, hid or lay on the ground, Lakdim threw a homemade grenade into the aisles; it did not explode. He then took a female employee, who was hiding in a storeroom behind the welcome desk, hostage and told her to phone the local police station. Lakdim told the police operator that he was a member of IS and wanted to take revenge on the French for bombing Syria and Iraq. He also demanded the release of Salah Abdeslam, the main suspect in the November 2015 Paris attacks

Police and gendarmes soon arrived in force, cordoned off the area and helped to evacuate people from the supermarket. At about 11:30 a.m. a lieutenant colonel of the gendarmerie, Arnaud Beltrame, persuaded Lakdim to let him change places with the hostage. A GIGN unit assembled outside the supermarket and interior minister Gérard Collomb arrived on the scene. Police brought Lakdim's mother and two of his sisters to aid in negotiations with Lakdim. At about 2:30 p.m., the GIGN negotiator opened a conversation with Beltrame and Lakdim on the phone. Beltrame then attempted to disarm Lakdim, calling out "Assault! Assault!" to the negotiator, who did not distinguish the words and delayed the assault for some minutes while trying to re-establish contact with Beltrame. It was only when shots were heard that the GIGN unit stormed the storeroom and exchanged gunfire with Lakdim. During the exchange, Lakdim was killed and a gendarme was injured. Beltrame had been stabbed in the neck and shot by Lakdim. He was taken to hospital where he died of his injuries the following morning. On searching the supermarket, police recovered three improvised explosive devices, a 7.65mm handgun and a hunting knife.

The attacks resulted in five deaths, including Lakdim's, and injured 15 people.

== Aftermath ==
On being informed of the attack, President Emmanuel Macron returned to Paris from Brussels. He said that the attack was undoubtedly an Islamist terrorist attack, although the claims of responsibility for the attack made by IS were still being investigated. He urged vigilance and asked the French people "to remember the force and resistance" they had shown whenever they had been attacked in the past.

Silva, the 26-year-old Portuguese national who had been shot in the head in the Aigles de la cité car park, spent two weeks in an induced coma in a neurological unit in Perpignan. Surgeons decided it was too dangerous to try and remove the bullet, which remained lodged in his brain. He lost an eye and was left deaf in one ear. It was only after more than five years and lengthy treatment from psychiatrists and psychologists that he was able to work again. Giving testimony at the trial in Paris, he described his job as a village postman as marking a new stage in his "second life".

On the evening of the attack, Lakdim's girlfriend and another friend were arrested. Investigations later led to indictments against seven people in Lakdim's circle of family and friends for having supported him in various ways in relation to the attacks.

On Sunday 25 March 2018, a memorial mass was held in the Church of Saint-Etienne in Trèbes. Those attending the service included members of the local Muslim community. The bishop of Narbonne and Carcassonne said that their presence "tells us that the creators of hatred will not win". After the service the local imam said that "Islam itself has been stabbed... by people who use symbols that are dear to our hearts".

After the news of Beltrame's death was released early on 24 March 2018, gendarmerie stations flew their flags at half-mast. Beltrame was given a state funeral on 28 March 2018, a national day of mourning. Macron paid homage to the officer, saying he had the "gratitude, admiration and affection of the whole country".

=== Reactions from world leaders ===
United Kingdom: Prime Minister Theresa May denounced the attack as "cowardly," and said the United Kingdom stood "in solidarity with our friends and allies in France, just as they always stand with us."

Israel: Prime Minister Benjamin Netanyahu condemned the attack, sent condolences and said: "The civilized world must unite and work together in order to defeat terrorism". President Reuven Rivlin also denounced the attack, saying: "The whole free world must stand united and firm against terror: in Jerusalem, in France, and across the world."

Canada: Prime Minister Justin Trudeau issued a statement of condemnation and solidarity against terrorism, and offered condolence on behalf of his citizens to victims' friends and families.

United States: President Donald Trump issued a statement on Twitter, condemning "the violent actions of the attacker and anyone who would provide him support." He continued, "we are with you @EmmanuelMacron!"

== Trial ==
On 22 January 2024, seven people went on trial in Paris in connection with the attack. Five were accused of criminal terrorist conspiracy (French: association de malfaiteurs en lien avec une entreprise terroriste criminelle), one was accused of a weapons offence (French: détention d’armes), while the seventh was accused of failure to denounce a crime (French: non dénonciation de crime) Two of the accused were detained, while five of them were on bail. The trial was held at the Palais de Justice in the courtroom that had been constructed for the Paris attacks trial, which was held in 2021–2022. The verdicts were announced on 23 February 2024. Only one defendant, Lakdim's girlfriend Marine Pequignot, was found guilty of criminal terrorist conspiracy. She received a five-year sentence. The remaining six defendants were found guilty of other crimes and sentenced to between twelve months and four years imprisonment.

Pequignot and two others lodged an appeal, which commenced on 14 September 2026.

== See also ==
- List of terrorist incidents in France § 21st century
