= Académie militaire de la Gendarmerie nationale =

French Gendarmerie Officers School

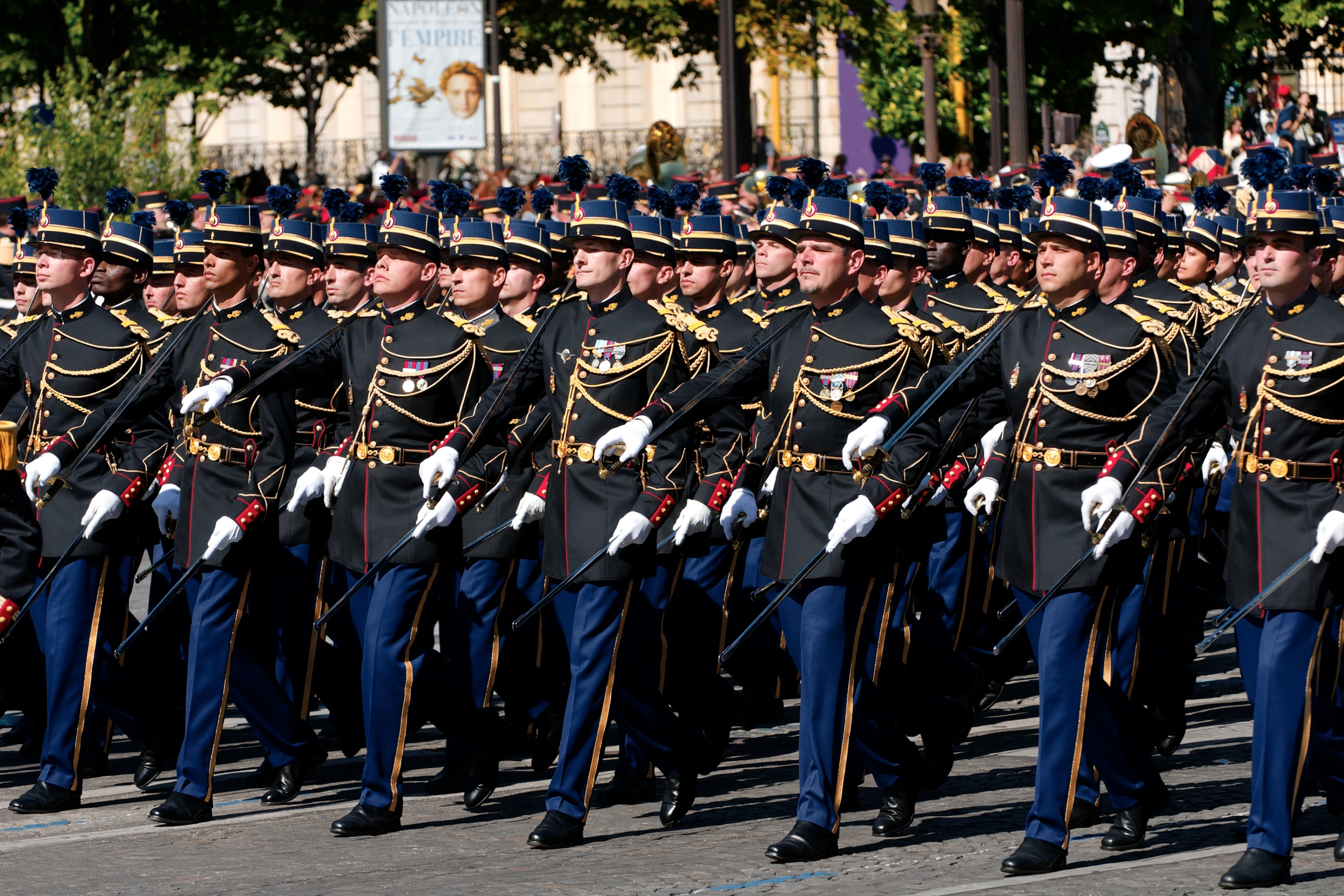
- Motto: Apprendre et s'élever pour servir et commander (French); Learn and rise to serve and command (English)
- Type: Military college
- Established: 1901
- Directeur de l'Académie militaire: Général de division Frantz Tavart
- Undergraduates: None (graduate degree in a military or civilian university is a prerequisite)
- Location: Avenue du Treizième Dragons, 77010 Melun, France, Melun, Seine-et-Marne, Île-de-France, France; 48.545278°N 2.656389°E
- Nickname: AMGN

The Académie militaire de la Gendarmerie nationale (AMGN, lit. 'National Gendarmerie Military Academy'; formerly École des officiers de la gendarmerie nationale, EOGN) is the French Gendarmerie nationale officers school, created in 1901, based in Melun. It trains and teaches military officers who enter the officer corps.

== History ==
In 1918, following the First World War, the school moved to Versailles and diversified by including in its ranks officers from not just the French Army but from other armies in Europe, as well as military police forces like the Spanish Civil Guard and the Italian Carabinieri, a tradition carried on till the present. It was not until 1937 that the school was presented Colours. This was officially handed over to the superintendent, Colonel Picot, 14 July 1937, on the Champs-Élysées by the President Albert Lebrun. During the Second World War, the school moved to Pau. In August 1943 it moved once again, this time to the Charras barracks in Courbevoie. It found its current home in the Augereau barracks in Melun on 1 October 1945.

From 2002, recruitment is carried out directly by competitive examination for academics holding a master's degree. On 1 September 2008, it became the sole facility for the continuous training of Gendarmerie officers, both in the operational and support fields. A research centre was also created on 1 September 2008.

== Application ==
Cadets are recruited through a national annual competitive exam, after previous graduate education. French students take exams on general knowledge, aptitude and intelligence; sit for an interview and pass a test of physical ability.

In addition, a number of foreign students are admitted annually.

== Training ==
Gendarmerie Officers are intended to command security professionals within the operational units of the gendarmerie. Their training lasts 2 years (1 year for captains and students who have already graduated from other military academies), and is structured around 4 semesters:

- 1st semester: military and tactical training with a view to acquiring the basics of command and developing the physical and moral qualities of future officers;
- 2nd semester: vocational training (technical and tactical) adapted to the gendarmerie's framework of action and environment within society ;
- 3rd semester: Professional training aimed at acquiring the tools and knowledge necessary for the implementation of gendarmerie resources by the future officer recognized as an expert in public security by the administrative, judicial, political and socio-economic authorities; at the same time, the officer can follow a university course leading to a master's degree;
- 4th semester: specialization of training and preparation for the first commission as a leader in one of the four dominant job areas:
  - Public security,
  - Riot control,
  - Judiciary - Intelligence,
  - Road traffic safety

Regardless of the course taken, directly recruited graduates are given an officer's commission as well as the transferees from other institutions.
