= François Mitterrand =

President of France from 1981 to 1995

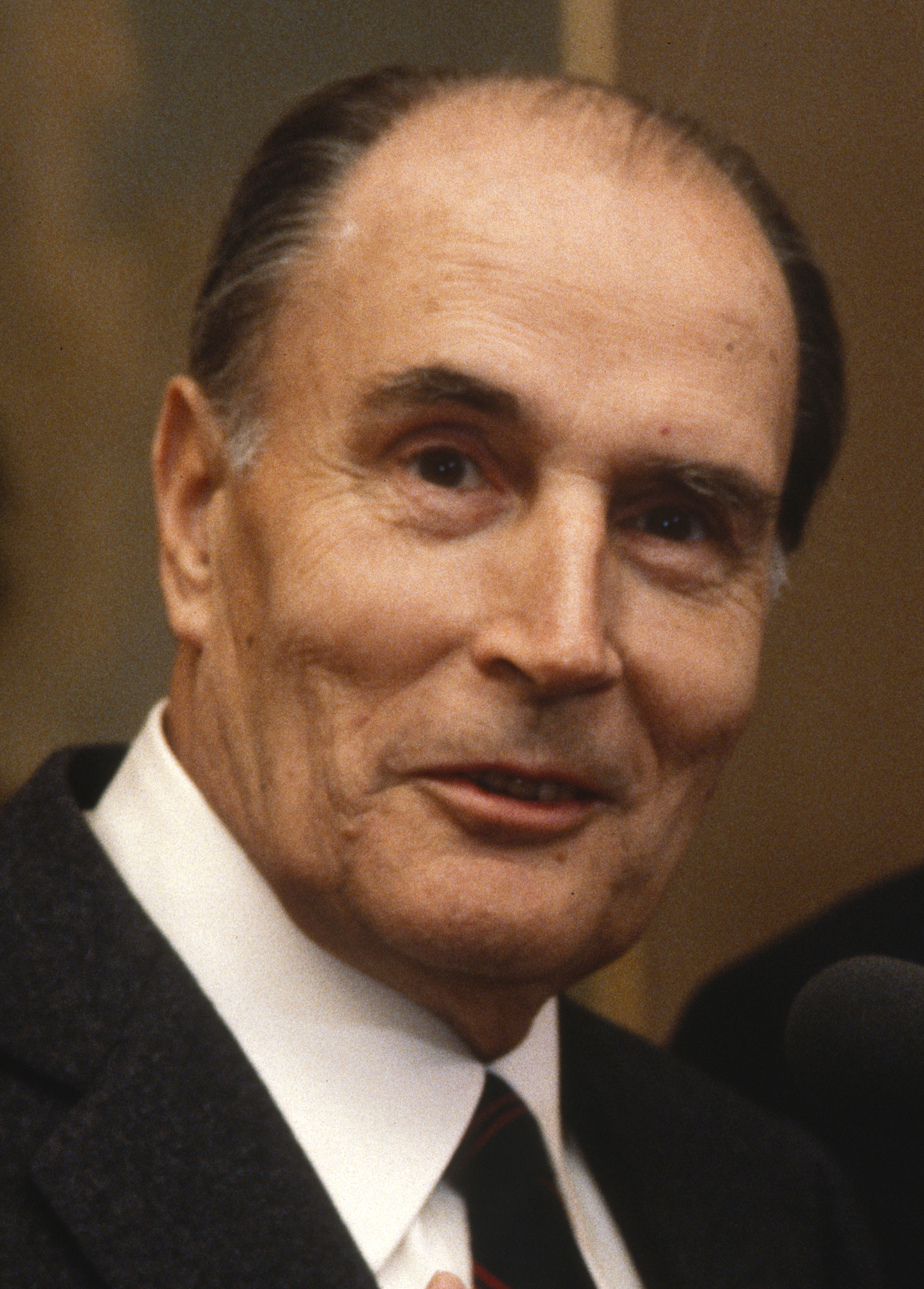
- Mitterrand in 1983

President of France
- In office 21 May 1981 – 17 May 1995
- Prime Minister: See list: Pierre Mauroy; Laurent Fabius; Jacques Chirac; Michel Rocard; Édith Cresson; Pierre Bérégovoy; Édouard Balladur
- Preceded by: Valéry Giscard d'Estaing
- Succeeded by: Jacques Chirac
Party political offices
First Secretary of the Socialist Party
In office 16 June 1971 – 24 January 1981
Preceded by	Alain Savary
Succeeded by	Lionel Jospin
President of the Federation of the Democratic and Socialist Left
In office 10 December 1965 – 7 November 1968
Preceded by	Party established
Succeeded by	Party abolished
Political offices
President of the General Council of Nièvre
In office 20 March 1964 – 15 May 1981
Preceded by	Arsène Célestin-Fié
Succeeded by	Noël Berrier
Mayor of Château-Chinon
In office 20 March 1959 – 15 May 1981
Preceded by	Robert Mantin
Succeeded by	René-Pierre Signé
Ministerial offices
Minister of Justice
In office 31 January 1956 – 12 June 1957
Prime Minister	Guy Mollet
Preceded by	Robert Schuman
Succeeded by	Édouard Corniglion-Molinier
Minister of the Interior
In office 19 June 1954 – 23 February 1955
Prime Minister	Pierre Mendès France
Preceded by	Léon Martinaud-Déplat
Succeeded by	Maurice Bourgès-Maunoury
Minister delegate to the Council of Europe
In office 28 June 1953 – 4 September 1953
Prime Minister	Joseph Laniel
Preceded by	Pierre Pflimlin
Succeeded by	Edgar Faure
Minister of Overseas France
In office 12 July 1950 – 15 August 1951
Prime Minister	René Pleven; Henri Queuille
Preceded by	Paul Coste-Floret
Succeeded by	Louis Jacquinot
Minister of Veterans and War Victims
In office 24 November 1947 – 19 July 1948
Prime Minister	Robert Schuman
Preceded by	Daniel Mayer
Succeeded by	André Maroselli
In office 22 January 1947 – 21 October 1947
Prime Minister	Paul Ramadier
Preceded by	Max Lejeune
Succeeded by	Daniel Mayer

Member of the National Assembly for Nièvre's 3rd constituency
- In office 6 December 1962 – 21 May 1981
- Preceded by: Jehan Faulquier
- Succeeded by: Bernard Bardin

Senator for Nièvre
- In office 26 April 1959 – 13 December 1962
- Preceded by: Jean Doussot
- Succeeded by: Daniel Benoist

Member of the National Assembly for Nièvre
- In office 10 November 1946 – 8 December 1958
- Preceded by: Roger Gillot
- Succeeded by: Jehan Faulquier

Personal details
- Born: François Marie Adrien Maurice Mitterrand; 26 October 1916 Jarnac, France
- Died: 8 January 1996 (aged 79) Paris, France
- Resting place: Cimetière des Grands-Maisons, Jarnac
- Party: Socialist (from 1969)
- Other political affiliations: Cross of Fire (before 1936); Democratic and Socialist Union of the Resistance (1945–1964); Convention of Republican Institutions (1964–1971)
- Spouse: Danielle Gouze (m. 1944)
- Children: 4, including Jean-Christophe and Mazarine
- Relatives: Frédéric Mitterrand (nephew)
- Education: University of Paris; Sciences Po
- Website: Mitterrand Institute

Military service
- Allegiance: French Third Republic
- Branch/service: French Army
- Years of service: 1937–1939; 1939–1941
- François Mitterrand's voice Mitterrand on France–United States relations Recorded 22 March 1984

François Marie Adrien Maurice Mitterrand (Note: /ˈmiːtərɒ̃/ or /ˈmɪt-/, US also /ˌmiːtɛˈrɒ̃, -ˈrɑːn(d)/; French: [fʁɑ̃swa maʁi adʁijɛ̃ mɔʁis mit(ɛ)ʁɑ̃, - moʁ-].) (26 October 1916 – 8 January 1996) was President of France from 1981 to 1995. He was the first left-wing politician to assume the presidency under the Fifth Republic, successfully remaining in office longer than any other republican head of state in French history.

Due to family influences, Mitterrand started his political life on the Catholic nationalist right. He served under the Vichy regime during its earlier years. Subsequently, he joined the Resistance, moved to the left, and held ministerial office several times under the Fourth Republic. Mitterrand opposed Charles de Gaulle's establishment of the Fifth Republic. Although at times a politically isolated figure, he outmanoeuvred rivals to become the left's standard bearer in the 1965 and 1974 presidential elections, before being elected president in the 1981 presidential election. He was re-elected in 1988 and remained in office until 1995.

In his first term, Mitterrand initially followed a radical left-wing economic agenda, including nationalisation of key firms and the introduction of the 39-hour work week. He likewise pushed a progressive agenda with reforms such as the abolition of the death penalty, and the end of a government monopoly in radio and television broadcasting. However, faced with economic tensions, he soon abandoned his nationalization programme, in favour of austerity and market liberalization policies. In 1985, Miterrand was faced with a major controversy after ordering the bombing of the Rainbow Warrior, a Greenpeace vessel docked in Auckland. Later in 1991, he became the first French President to appoint a female prime minister, Édith Cresson. During his presidency, Mitterrand was twice forced by the loss of a parliamentary majority into "cohabitation governments" with conservative cabinets led, respectively, by Jacques Chirac (1986–1988), and Édouard Balladur (1993–1995).

Mitterrand’s foreign and defence policies built on those of his Gaullist predecessors, except in regard to their reluctance to support European integration, which he reversed. His partnership with German chancellor Helmut Kohl advanced European integration via the Maastricht Treaty, and he accepted German reunification.

Less than eight months after leaving office, he died from the prostate cancer he had successfully concealed for most of his presidency. Beyond making the French Left electable, Mitterrand presided over the rise of the Socialist Party to dominance of the left, and the decline of the once-dominant Communist Party. (Note: As a share of the popular vote in the first presidential round, the Communists shrank from a peak of 21.27% in 1969 to 8.66% in 1995, at the end of Mitterrand's second term.)

== Family ==
François Marie Adrien Maurice Mitterrand was born on 26 October 1916 in Jarnac, Charente, the son of Joseph Mitterrand and Yvonne Lorrain. His family was devoutly Catholic and conservative. His father worked as a stationmaster for the Compagnie Paris Orléans railway. He had three brothers, Robert, Jacques (retired General and head of the French state aircraft company Aerospatiale), and Philippe, and four sisters, Antoinette, Marie-Josèphe, Colette, and Geneviève.

Mitterrand's wife, Danielle Mitterrand (née Gouze, 1924–2011), came from a socialist background and worked for various left-wing causes. They married on 24 October 1944 and had three sons: Pascal (10 June – 17 September 1945), Jean-Christophe, born in 1946, and Gilbert, born on 4 February 1949. He also had two children as results of extra-marital affairs: an acknowledged daughter, Mazarine (born 1974), with his mistress Anne Pingeot, and an unacknowledged son, Hravn Forsne (born 1988), with Swedish journalist Chris Forsne.

François Mitterrand's nephew Frédéric Mitterrand was a journalist, Minister of Culture and Communications under Nicolas Sarkozy (and a supporter of Jacques Chirac, former French President), and his wife's brother-in-law Roger Hanin was a well-known French actor.

== Early life ==
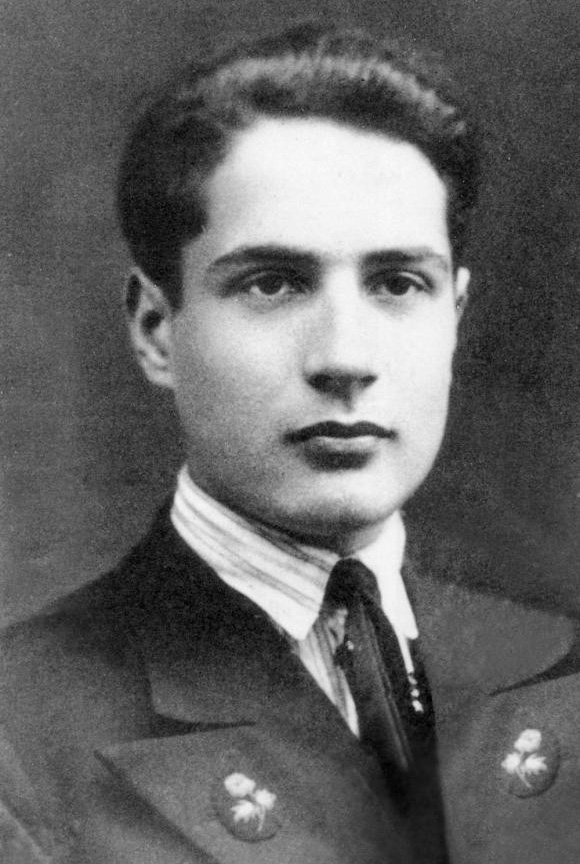
Mitterrand in 1933

François Mitterrand studied from 1925 to 1934 at the Collège Saint-Paul in Angoulême, where he became a member of the Jeunesse Étudiante Chrétienne, the student organisation of Action catholique. Arriving in Paris in the autumn of 1934, he then went to the École Libre des Sciences Politiques until 1937, where he obtained his diploma in July of that year. François Mitterrand took membership for about a year in the Volontaires nationaux (National Volunteers), an organisation related to François de la Rocque's far-right league, the Croix de Feu; the league had just participated in the 6 February 1934 riots which led to the fall of the second Cartel des Gauches (Left-Wing Coalition).

Contrary to some reports, Mitterrand never became a formal member of the French Social Party, which was the successor to the Croix de Feu and may be considered the first French right-wing mass party. However, he did write news articles in the L'Écho de Paris newspaper, which was close to the Social Party. He participated in the demonstrations against the "invasion métèque" in February 1935 and then in those against law teacher Gaston Jèze, who had been nominated as juridical counsellor of Ethiopia's Negus, in January 1936.

When Mitterrand's involvement in these conservative nationalist movements was revealed in the 1990s, he attributed his actions to the milieu of his youth. He furthermore had some personal and family relations with members of the Cagoule, a far-right terrorist group in the 1930s.

Mitterrand then served his conscription from 1937 to 1939 in the 23rd régiment d'infanterie coloniale. In 1938, he became the best friend of Georges Dayan, a Jewish socialist, whom he saved from anti-Semitic aggressions by the national-royalist movement Action française. His friendship with Dayan caused Mitterrand to begin to question some of his nationalist ideas. Finishing his law studies, he was sent in September 1939 to the Maginot line near Montmédy, with the rank of Sergeant-chief (infantry sergeant). He became engaged to Marie-Louise Terrasse (future actress and television presenter Catherine Langeais) in May 1940, when she was 16, but she broke it off in January 1942. Following an observation of Nazi concentration camps at the end of World War II, François Mitterrand became an agnostic.

== Second World War ==
François Mitterrand's actions during World War II were the cause of much controversy in France during the 1980s and 1990s. Mitterand was called up for military service in 1938 and joined the 23rd Colonial Infantry Regiment (RIC) [fr] at Fort d'Ivry. During the Phoney War, he was deployed with the 23rd RIC to Alsace in September 1939 and then to the Ardennes, near Stenay, in December. Mitterrand was wounded by shrapnel during the Battle of France on 14 June 1940, at the Cote 304 near Verdun. He was hospitalised in Toul and then Bruyères, where he was captured by the Germans on 21 June.

=== Prisoner of war: 1940–1941 ===
Mitterrand was initially held at Stalag IX A, 60 km (37 mi) southwest of Kassel, before being transferred to Stalag IX C, Kommando 1515, in Schaala [de], Thuringia. In March 1941, Mitterrand made his escape with fellow POW Father Xavier Leclerc while they were on work detail. Mitterrand and Leclerc trekked 550 km (340 mi) over 22 days, but were arrested at Egesheim, just 30 km (19 mi) from the Swiss border, and returned to Stalag IX A. Mitterrand was appointed one of ten chancellors of the ZUT, a temporary university in Ziegenhain, where he gave lectures on the ancien régime and Voltaire. He claims that his activity in the camp and the influence of the people he met there began to change his political ideas, moving him towards the left. On 28 November Mitterrand escaped with forged papers and made it to Metz, however he was denounced by the landlady of a hotel he rested at and was taken to a sorting camp for escapees in Boulay-Moselle.

Before he could be transferred to another camp, likely to have been in Poland, Mitterrand escaped through the barbed wire on 10 December and hid in a nearby hospital. He was sheltered by a nurse at the hospital, Marie Baron, who had helped several escapees in the village and who entrusted him to friends since she was being surveilled by the Gestapo. On 15 December, Baron collected him and took him to Metz where she contacted Hélène Studler, who operated an escape network. That evening, Mitterrand rendezvoused with three other escapees and a member of Sister Hélène's network at Saint-Martin Church [fr], who took them to meet a smuggler at Metz train station. The escapees and the smuggler boarded a train towards the border between Moselle, which had been de facto annexed to Germany, and the occupied zone, bailing during a slowdown for roadworks, and crossed the border. Mitterrand reached Nancy where another member of Sister Hélène's network, a Brother of the Christian Schools, provided him with false identity papers and directions to the zone libre via Besançon and Mouchard, which he crossed into near Chamblay on 16 December. (Note: Pierre Péan notes that several accounts of the escape have circulated, with him selecting one that Mitterrand gave in 1947 and which was corrected in places by Baron.)

=== Work in France under the Vichy administration: 1941–1943 ===
With help from a friend of his mother, Mitterrand got a job as a mid-level functionary of the Vichy government, looking after the interests of POWs. This was very unusual for an escaped prisoner, and he later claimed to have served as a spy for the Free French Forces. Mitterrand worked from January to April 1942 for the Légion française des combattants et des volontaires de la révolution nationale ("Legion of French combatants and volunteers of the national revolution") as a civil servant on a temporary contract. Mitterrand worked under Jean-Paul Favre de Thierrens who was a spy for the British secret service. He then moved to the Commissariat au reclassement des prisonniers de guerre ("Service for the Reorientation of POWs"). During this period, Mitterrand was aware of Thierrens's activities and may have helped in his disinformation campaign. At the same time, he published an article detailing his time as a POW in the magazine France, revue de l'État nouveau (the magazine was published as propaganda by the Vichy Regime).

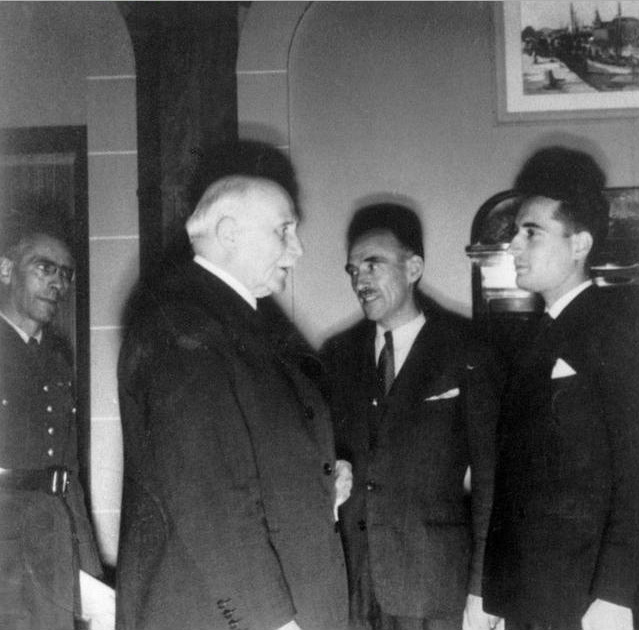
Mitterrand (right) with Philippe Pétain on 15 October 1942

Mitterrand has been called a "Vichysto-résistant" (an expression used by the historian Jean-Pierre Azéma to describe people who supported Marshal Philippe Pétain, the head of the Vichy Regime, before 1943, but subsequently rejected the Vichy Regime).

From spring 1942, he met other escaped POWs Jean Roussel, Max Varenne, and Dr. Guy Fric, under whose influence he became involved with the resistance. In April, François Mitterrand and Fric caused a major disturbance in a public meeting held by the collaborator Georges Claude. From mid-1942, he sent false papers to POWs in Germany and on 12 June and 15 August 1942, he joined meetings at the Château de Montmaur which formed the base of his future network for the resistance. From September, he made contact with Free French Forces, but clashed with Michel Cailliau, General Charles de Gaulle's nephew (and de Gaulle's candidate to head-up all POW-related resistance organizations). On 15 October 1942, François Mitterrand and Marcel Barrois (a member of the resistance deported in 1944) met Marshal Philippe Pétain along with other members of the Comité d'entraide aux prisonniers rapatriés de l'Allier (Mutual Assistance Committee for Repatriated POWs of the Allier Department). By the end of 1942, François Mitterrand met Pierre Guillain de Bénouville, an old friend from his days with La Cagoule. Bénouville was a member of the resistance groups Combat and Noyautage des administrations publiques (NAP).

In late 1942, the non-occupied zone was invaded by the Germans. Mitterrand left the Commissariat in January 1943, when his boss Maurice Pinot, another vichysto-résistant, was replaced by the collaborator André Masson, but he remained in charge of the centres d'entraides. In the spring of 1943, along with Gabriel Jeantet, a member of Marshal Pétain's cabinet, and Simon Arbellot (both former members of La Cagoule), Mitterrand received the Order of the Francisque (the honorific distinction of the Vichy Regime).

Debate rages in France as to the significance of this. When Mitterrand's Vichy past was exposed in the 1950s, he at first denied having received the Francisque (some sources say he was designated for the award, but never received the medal because he went into hiding before the ceremony took place). Socialist Resistance leader Jean Pierre-Bloch says that Mitterrand was ordered to accept the medal as cover for his work in the Resistance. Pierre Moscovici and Jacques Attali remain skeptical of Mitterrand's beliefs at this time, accusing him of having at best a "foot in each camp" until he was sure who the winner would be. They noted his friendship with René Bousquet and the wreaths he was said to have placed on Pétain's tomb in later years (see below) as examples of his ambivalent attitude.

In 1994, while President of France, Mitterrand maintained that the roundup of Jews who were then deported to death camps during the war was solely the work of "Vichy France", an entity distinct from France: "The Republic had nothing to do with this. I do not believe France is responsible." This position was rejected by President Jacques Chirac in 1995 who stated that it was time that France faced up to its past. He acknowledged the role of the state – "4,500 policemen and gendarmes, French, under the authority of their leaders [who] obeyed the demands of the Nazis" – in the Holocaust. Chirac added that the "criminal madness of the occupiers was seconded by the French, by the French State".

President Emmanuel Macron was even more specific as to the State's responsibility for the 1942 Vel' d'Hiv Roundup of 13,000 Jews for deportation to concentration camps. It was indeed "France that organized the roundup, the deportation, and thus, for almost all, death." It was done by "French police collaborating with the Nazis", he said on 16 July 2017. "It is convenient to see the Vichy regime as born of nothingness, returned to nothingness. Yes, it’s convenient, but it is false. We cannot build pride upon a lie."

=== Full engagement in resistance: 1943–1945 ===
Mitterrand built up a resistance network, composed mainly of former POWs. The POWs National Rally (Rassemblement national des prisonniers de guerre, RNPG) was affiliated with General Henri Giraud, a former POW who had escaped from a German prison and made his way across Germany back to the Allied forces. In 1943 Giraud was contesting with de Gaulle for the leadership of the French Resistance.

From the beginning of 1943, Mitterrand had contacts with a powerful resistance group called the Organisation de résistance de l'armée (ORA), organised by former French military personnel. From this time on, François Mitterrand could act as a member of the ORA, moreover he set up his own RNPG network with Pinot in February and he obtained funding for his own network. In March, François Mitterrand met Henri Frenay, who encouraged the resistance in France to support François Mitterrand over Michel Cailliau. 28 May 1943, when François Mitterrand met with Gaullist Philippe Dechartre, is generally taken as the date François Mitterrand split with Vichy. According to Dechartre, the meeting on 28 May 1943 was set up because "there were three movements [of Résistance:] […] the Gaullist, the communist, and one from support centers […] hence I was assigned the mission to prepare what would be called afterwards the merger [of the three movements]."

During 1943, the RNPG gradually changed from providing false papers to information-gathering for France libre. Pierre de Bénouville said, "François Mitterrand created a true spy network in the POW camps which gave us information, often decisive, about what was going on behind the German borders." On 10 July François Mitterrand and Piatzook (a militant communist) interrupted a public meeting in the Salle Wagram in Paris. The meeting was about allowing French POWs to go home if they were replaced by young French men forced to go and work in Germany (in French this was called "la relève"). When André Masson began to talk about "la trahison des gaullistes" (the Gaullist treason), François Mitterrand stood up in the audience and shouted him down, saying Masson had no right to talk on behalf of POWs and calling la relève a "con" (i.e., something stupid). Mitterrand avoided arrest as Piatzook covered his escape.

In November 1943, the Sicherheitsdienst raided a flat in Vichy, where they hoped to arrest François Morland, a member of the resistance. "Morland" was François Mitterrand's cover name. He also used Purgon, Monnier, Laroche, Captain François, Arnaud et Albre as cover names. The man they arrested was Pol Pilven, a member of the resistance who was to survive the war in a concentration camp. François Mitterrand was in Paris at the time.

Warned by his friends, Mitterrand escaped to London aboard a Lysander plane on 15 November 1943 (piloted by then-Squadron Leader Lewis Hodges). He promoted his movement to the British and American Authorities, but he was sent to Algiers, where he met de Gaulle, by then the uncontested leader of the Free French. The two men clashed, de Gaulle refused to jeopardize the Resistance by including a movement that gathered information from POWs. Later Mitterrand refused to merge his group with other POW movements if de Gaulle's nephew Cailliau was to be the leader. Under the influence of Henri Frenay, de Gaulle finally agreed to merge his nephew's network and the RNPG with Mitterrand in charge. Thus the RNPG was listed in the French Force organization from spring 1944.

Mitterrand returned to France by boat via England. In Paris, the three Resistance groups made up of POWs (Communists, Gaullists, RNPG) finally merged as the POWs and Deportees National Movement (Mouvement national des prisonniers de guerre et déportés, MNPGD) and Mitterrand took the lead. In his memoirs, he says that he had started this organisation while he was still officially working for the Vichy Regime. From 27 November 1943, Mitterrand worked for the Bureau central de renseignements et d'action. In December 1943 François Mitterrand ordered the execution of Henri Marlin (who was about to order attacks on the "Maquis") by Jacques Paris and Jean Munier, who later hid out with François Mitterrand's father.

After a second visit to London in February 1944, Mitterrand took part in the liberation of Paris in August; he took over the headquarters of Commissariat général aux prisonniers de guerre (general office for POW, the ministry he was working for), immediately he took up the vacant post of secretary general of POWs. When de Gaulle entered Paris following the Liberation, he was introduced to various men who were to be part of the provisional government. Among them was François Mitterrand, when they came face to face, de Gaulle is said to have muttered: "You again!" He dismissed François Mitterrand 2 weeks later.

In October 1944, Mitterrand and Jacques Foccart developed a plan to liberate the POW and concentration camps. This was called operation Vicarage. On the orders of de Gaulle, in April 1945 François Mitterrand accompanied General Lewis as the French representative at the liberation of the camps at Kaufering and Dachau. By chance Mitterrand discovered his friend and member of his network, Robert Antelme, suffering from typhus. Antelme was restricted to the camp to prevent the spread of disease, but François Mitterrand arranged for his "escape" and sent him back to France for treatment.

== Fourth Republic ==
=== Rise in politics: 1946–1954 ===
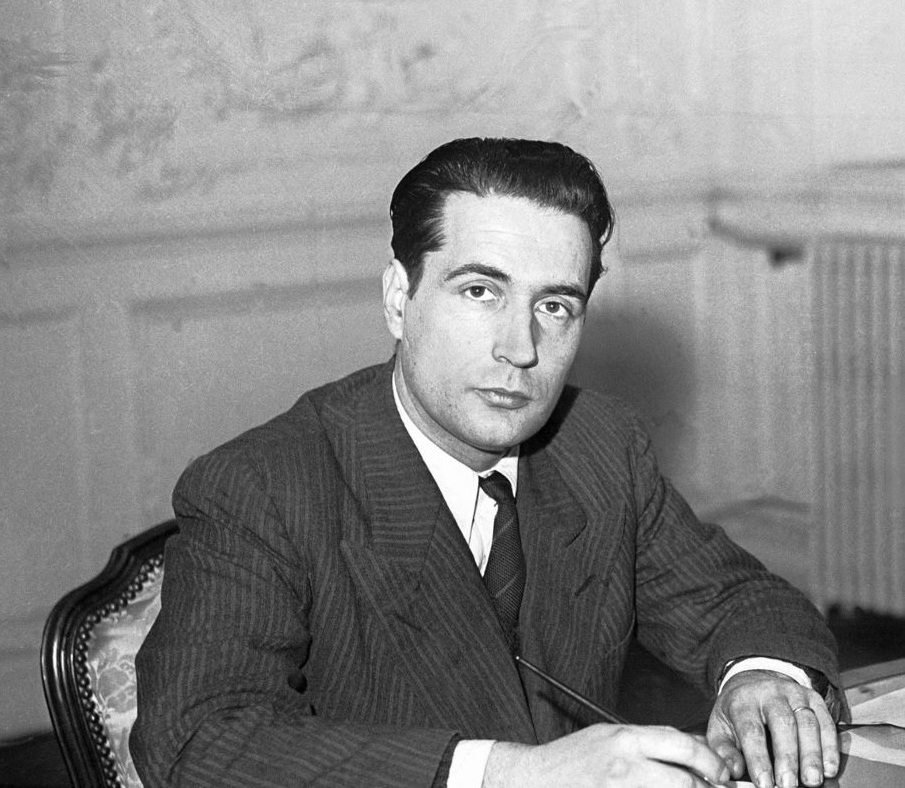
Mitterrand as War Veterans Minister in February 1947

After the war, Mitterrand quickly moved back into politics. At the June 1946 legislative election, he led the list of the Rally of the Republican Lefts (Rassemblement des gauches républicaines, RGR) in the Western suburb of Paris, but he was not elected. The RGR was an electoral entity composed of the Radical Party, the centrist Democratic and Socialist Union of the Resistance (Union démocratique et socialiste de la Résistance, UDSR) and several conservative groupings. It opposed the policy of the "Three-parties alliance" (Communists, Socialists and Christian Democrats).

In the November 1946 legislative election, he succeeded in winning a seat as deputy from the Nièvre département. To be elected, he had to win a seat at the expense of the French Communist Party (PCF). As leader of the RGR list, he led a very anti-communist campaign. He became a member of the UDSR party. In January 1947, he joined the cabinet as War Veterans Minister. He held various offices in the Fourth Republic as a Deputy and as a Minister (holding eleven different portfolios in total), including as a mayor of Château-Chinon from 1959 to 1981.

In May 1948, Mitterrand participated in the Congress of The Hague, together with Konrad Adenauer, Winston Churchill, Harold Macmillan, Paul-Henri Spaak, Albert Coppé and Altiero Spinelli. It originated the European Movement.

As Overseas Minister (1950–1951), Mitterrand opposed the colonial lobby to propose a reform program. He connected with the left when he resigned from the cabinet after the arrest of Morocco's sultan (1953). As leader of the progressive wing of the UDSR, he took the head of the party in 1953, replacing the conservative René Pleven.

In June 1953, Mitterrand attended the coronation of Queen Elizabeth II. Seated next to the elderly Princess Marie Bonaparte, he reported having spent much of the ceremony being psychoanalyzed by her.

=== Senior minister during the Algerian War: 1954–1958 ===
As Interior Minister in Pierre Mendès-France's cabinet (1954–1955), Mitterrand had to direct the response to the Algerian War of Independence. He claimed: "Algeria is France." He was suspected of being the informer of the Communist Party in the cabinet. This rumour was spread by the former Paris police prefect, who had been dismissed by him. The suspicions were dismissed by subsequent investigations.

The UDSR joined the Republican Front, a centre-left coalition, which won the 1956 legislative election. As Justice Minister (1956–1957), François Mitterrand allowed the expansion of martial law in the Algerian conflict. Unlike other ministers (including Mendès-France), who criticised the repressive policy in Algeria, he remained in Guy Mollet's cabinet until its end. As Minister of Justice, he had a role in 45 executions of the Algerian natives, recommending President René Coty to reject clemency in 80% of the cases, an action he later came to regret. François Mitterrand's role in confirming the death sentences of FLN rebels convicted by French courts of terrorism and later in abolishing the death penalty in 1981 led the British writer Anthony Daniels (writing under his pseudonym of Theodore Dalrymple) to accuse François Mitterrand of being an unprincipled opportunist, a cynical politician who proudly confirmed death sentences of FLN rebels in the 1950s when it was popular and who only came to champion abolishing the death penalty when this was popular with the French people.

As Minister of Justice, he was an official representative of France during the wedding of Rainier III, Prince of Monaco, and actress Grace Kelly. Under the Fourth Republic, he was representative of a generation of young ambitious politicians. He appeared as a possible future prime minister.

== Opposition during the Fifth Republic ==
=== Crossing the desert: 1958–1964 ===
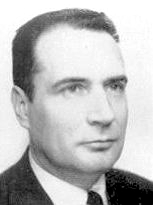
Mitterrand in 1959

In 1958, Mitterrand was one of the few to object to the nomination of Charles de Gaulle as head of government and to de Gaulle's plan for a Fifth Republic. He justified his opposition by the circumstances of de Gaulle's comeback: the 13 May 1958 quasi-putsch and military pressure. In September 1958, determinedly opposed to Charles de Gaulle, François Mitterrand made an appeal to vote "no" in the referendum over the Constitution, which was nevertheless adopted on 4 October 1958. This defeated coalition of the "No" was composed of the PCF and some left-wing republican politicians (such as Pierre Mendès-France and François Mitterrand).

This attitude may have been a factor in Mitterrand's losing his seat in the 1958 elections, beginning a long "crossing of the desert" (this term is usually applied to de Gaulle's decline in influence for a similar period). Indeed, in the second round of the legislative election, François Mitterrand was supported by the Communists but the French Section of the Workers' International (SFIO) refused to withdraw its candidate. This division caused the election of the Gaullist candidate. One year later, he was elected to represent Nièvre in the Senate, where he was part of the Group of the Democratic Left. At the same time, he was not admitted to the ranks of the Unified Socialist Party (Parti socialiste unifié, PSU) which was created by Mendès-France, former internal opponents of Mollet and reform-minded former members of the Communist Party. The PSU leaders justified their decision by referring to his non-resignation from Mollet's cabinet and by his past in Vichy.

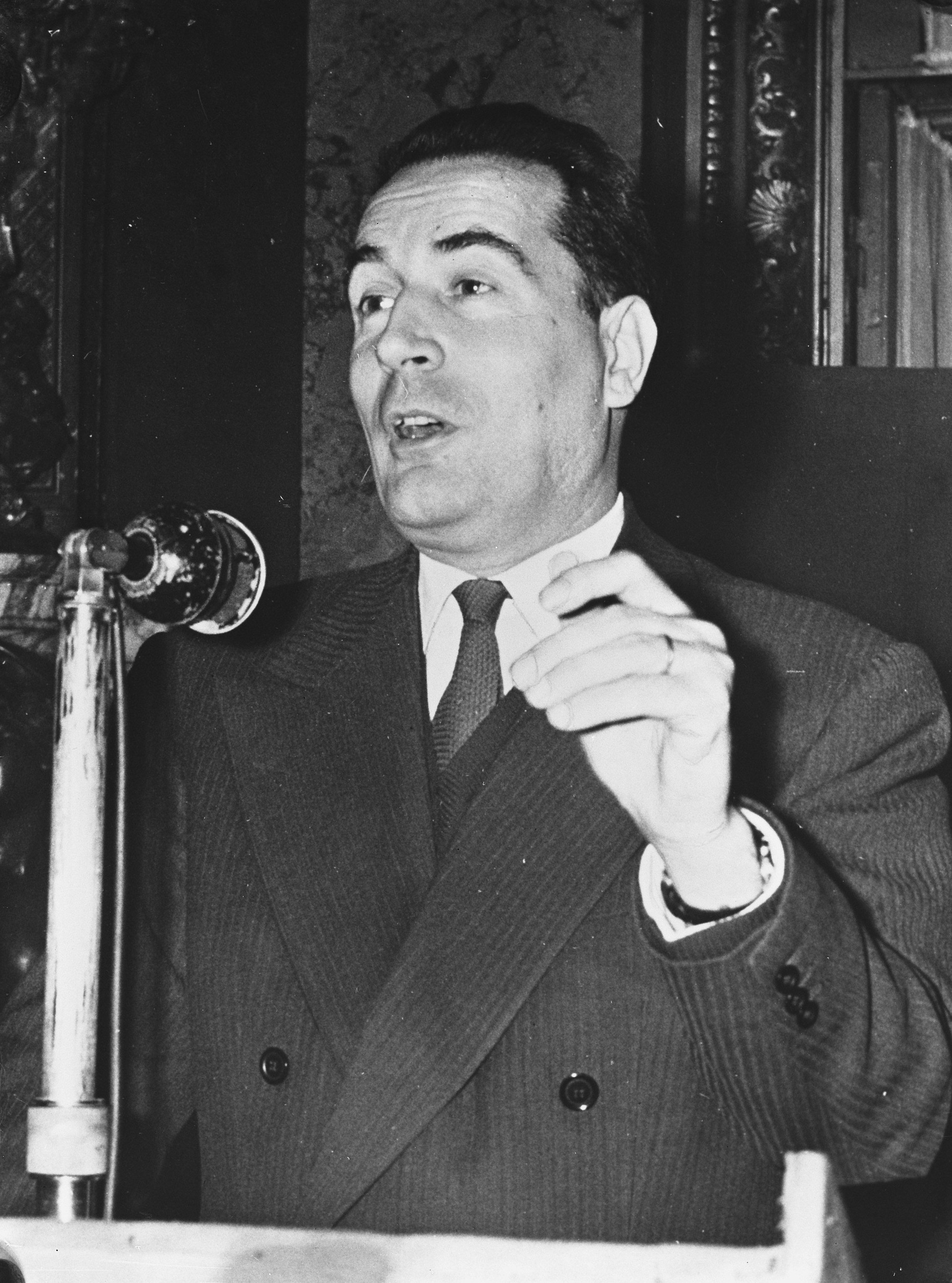
Mitterrand on 16 October 1959

Also in that same year, on the Avenue de l'Observatoire in Paris, Mitterrand claimed to have escaped an assassin's bullet by diving behind a hedge, in what became known as the "Observatory Affair". The incident brought him a great deal of publicity, initially boosting his political ambitions. Some of Mitterrand's critics claimed, however, that he had staged the incident himself, resulting in a backlash against him. He later said he had earlier been warned by right-wing deputy Robert Pesquet that he was the target of an Algérie française death squad and accused Prime Minister Michel Debré of being its instigator. Before his death, Pesquet claimed that Mitterrand had set up a fake attempt on his life. Prosecution was initiated against François Mitterrand but was later dropped. Nonetheless, the Observatory Affair cast a lasting shadow over Mitterrand's reputation. Years later in 1965, when François Mitterrand emerged as the challenger to de Gaulle in the second round of the presidential elections, de Gaulle was urged by an aide to use the Observatory Affair to discredit his opponent. "No, and don't insist" was the General's response, "It would be wrong to demean the office of the Presidency, since one day he [Mitterrand] may have the job."

Mitterrand visited China in 1961, during the worst of the Great Chinese Famine, but denied the existence of starvation.

=== Opposition to De Gaulle: 1964–1971 ===
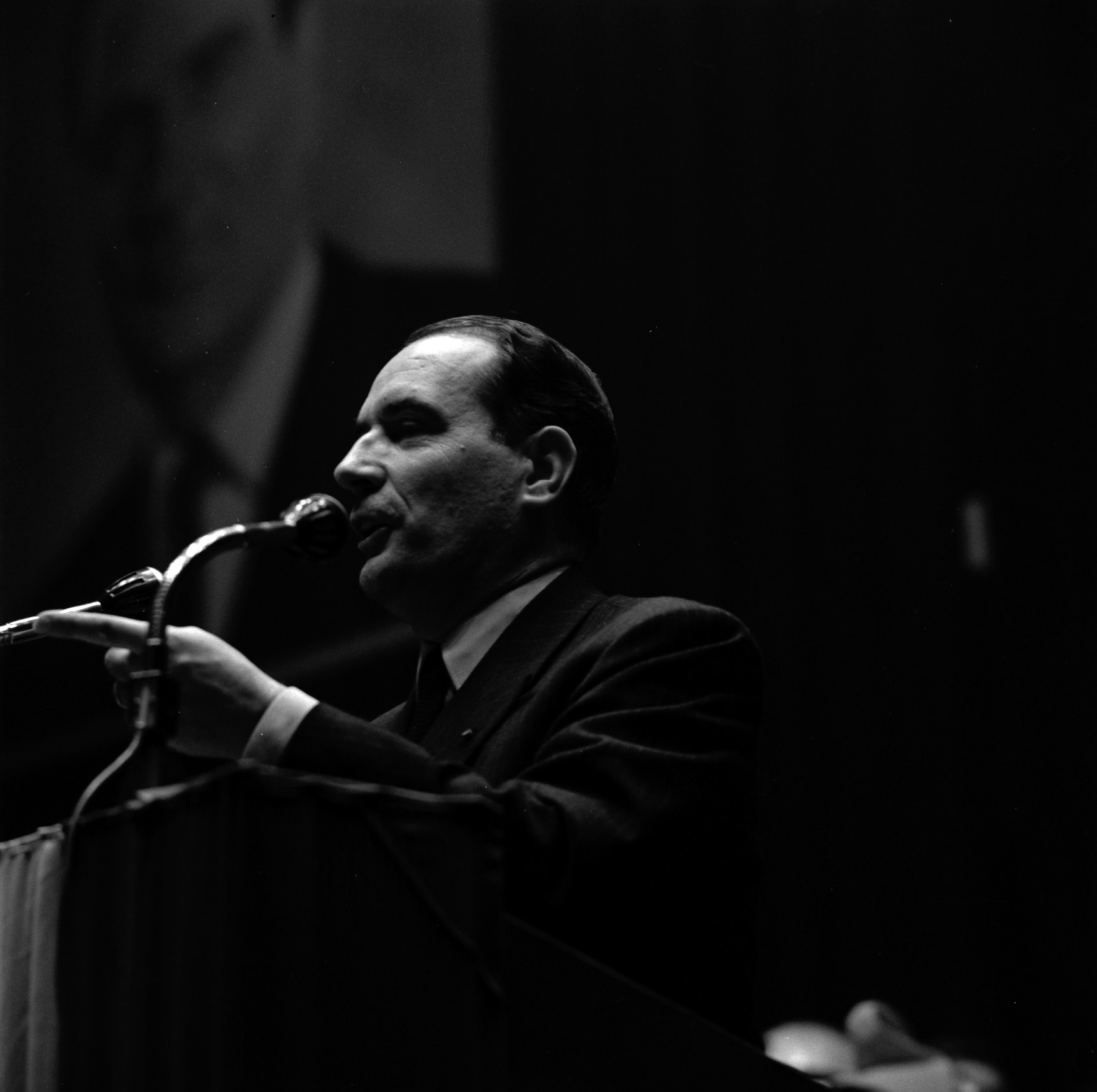
Mitterrand in Toulouse on 17 December 1965 during the 1965 presidential election campaign

In the 1962 election, Mitterrand regained his seat in the National Assembly with the support of the PCF and the SFIO. Practising left unity in Nièvre, he advocated the rallying of left-wing forces at the national level, including the PCF, in order to challenge Gaullist domination. Two years later, he became the president (chairman) of the General Council of Nièvre. While the opposition to De Gaulle organized in clubs, he founded his own group, the Convention of Republican Institutions (Convention des institutions républicaines, CIR). He reinforced his position as a left-wing opponent to Charles de Gaulle in publishing Le Coup d'État permanent (The permanent coup, 1964), which criticized de Gaulle's personal power, the weaknesses of Parliament and of the government, the President's exclusive control of foreign affairs, and defence, etc.

In 1965, Mitterrand was the first left-wing politician who saw the presidential election by universal suffrage as a way to defeat the opposition leadership. Not a member of any specific political party, his candidacy for presidency was accepted by all left-wing parties (the French Section of the Workers' International (SFIO), French Communist Party (PCF), Radical-Socialist Party (PR) and Unified Socialist Party (PSU)). He ended the cordon sanitaire of the PCF which the party had been subject to since 1947. For the SFIO leader Guy Mollet, Mitterrand's candidacy prevented Gaston Defferre, his rival in the SFIO, from running for the presidency. Furthermore, Mitterrand was a lone figure, so he did not appear as a danger to the left-wing parties' staff members.

De Gaulle was expected to win in the first round, but Mitterrand received 31.7% of the vote, denying De Gaulle a first-round victory. Mitterrand was supported in the second round by the left and other anti-Gaullists: centrist Jean Monnet, moderate conservative Paul Reynaud and Jean-Louis Tixier-Vignancour, an extreme right-winger and the lawyer who had defended Raoul Salan, one of the four generals who had organized the 1961 Algiers putsch during the Algerian War.

Mitterrand received 44.8% of votes in the second round and de Gaulle, with the majority, was thus elected for another term, but this defeat was regarded as honourable, for no one was really expected to defeat de Gaulle. Mitterrand took the lead of a centre-left alliance: the Federation of the Democratic and Socialist Left (Fédération de la gauche démocrate et socialiste, FGDS). It was composed of the SFIO, the Radicals and several left-wing republican clubs (such the CIR of François Mitterrand).

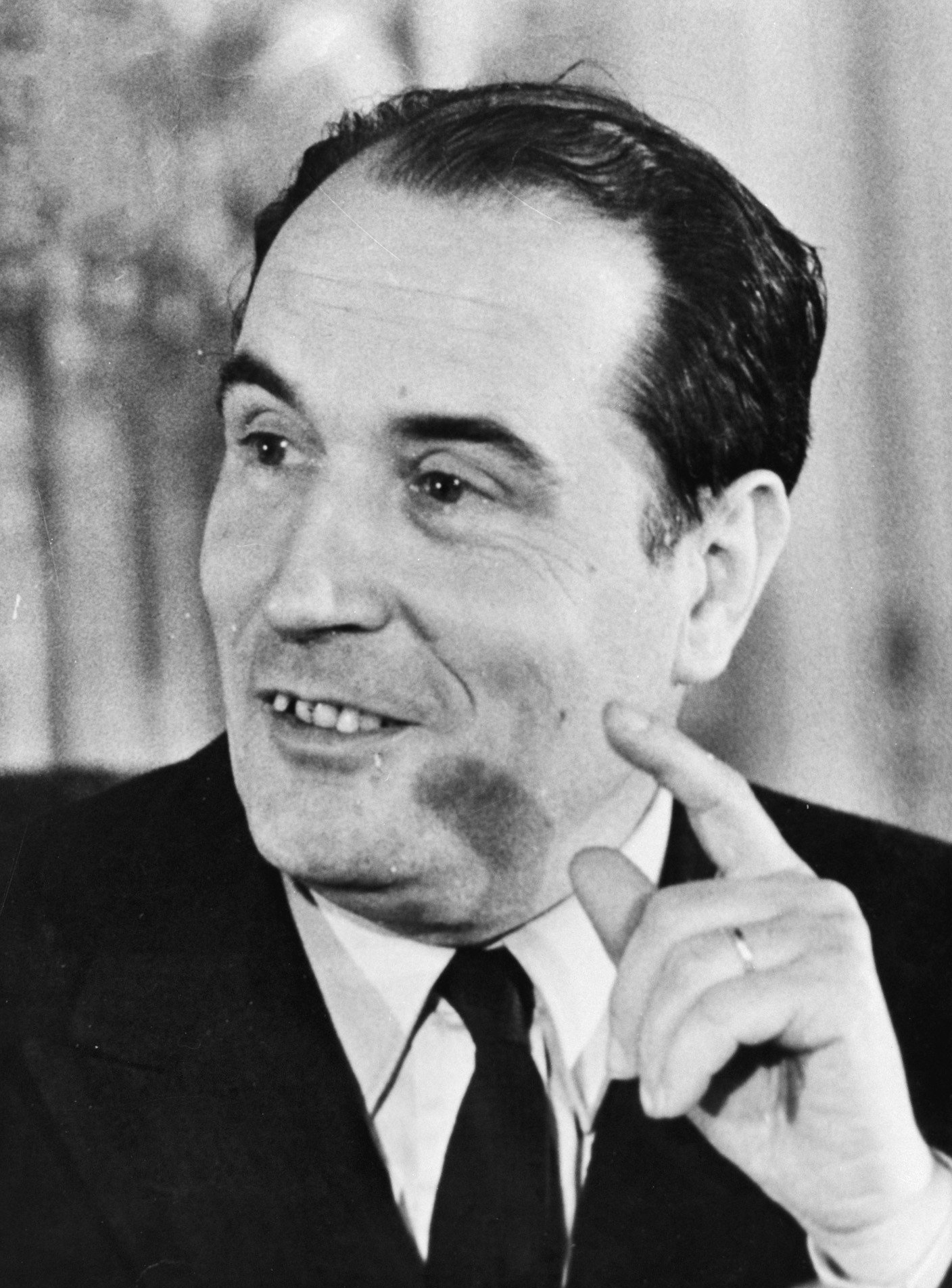
Mitterrand on 29 May 1968

In the legislative election of March 1967, the system where all candidates who failed to pass a 10% threshold in the first round were eliminated from the second round favoured the pro-Gaullist majority, which faced a split opposition (PCF, FGDS and centrists of Jacques Duhamel). Nevertheless, the parties of the left managed to gain 63 seats more than previously for a total of 194. The Communists remained the largest left-wing group with 22.5% of votes. The governing coalition won with its majority reduced by only one seat (247 seats out of 487).

In Paris, the Left (FGDS, PSU, PCF) managed to win more votes in the first round than the two governing parties (46% against 42.6%) while the Democratic Centre of Duhamel got 7% of votes. But with 38% of votes, de Gaulle's Union for the Fifth Republic remained the leading French party.

During the May 1968 governmental crisis, Mitterrand held a press conference to announce his candidacy if a new presidential election was held. But after the Gaullist demonstration on the Champs-Élysées, de Gaulle dissolved the Assembly and called for a legislative election instead. In this election, the right-wing won its largest majority since the Bloc National in 1919.

Mitterrand was accused of being responsible for this huge legislative defeat and the FGDS split. In 1969, Mitterrand could not run for the Presidency: Guy Mollet refused to give him the support of the SFIO. The left-wing was eliminated in the first round, with the Socialist candidate Gaston Defferre winning a humiliating 5.1 per cent of the total vote. Georges Pompidou faced the centrist Alain Poher in the second round.

=== Socialist Party leader: 1971–1981 ===
After the FGDS's implosion Mitterrand turned to the Socialist Party (Parti socialiste or PS). In June 1971, at the time of the Epinay Congress, the CIR joined the PS, which had succeeded the SFIO in 1969. The executive of the PS was then dominated by Guy Mollet's supporters. They proposed an "ideological dialogue" with the Communists. For Mitterrand, an electoral alliance with the Communists was necessary to rise to power. With this in mind, Mitterrand obtained the support of all the internal opponents to Mollet's faction and was elected as the first secretary of the PS. At the 1971 congress, he declared: "Whoever does not accept the break with the established order, with capitalist society, cannot be an adherent of the Socialist Party."

In June 1972, Mitterrand signed the Common Programme of Government with the Communist Georges Marchais and the Left Radical Robert Fabre. With this programme, he led the 1973 legislative campaign of the "Union of the Left".

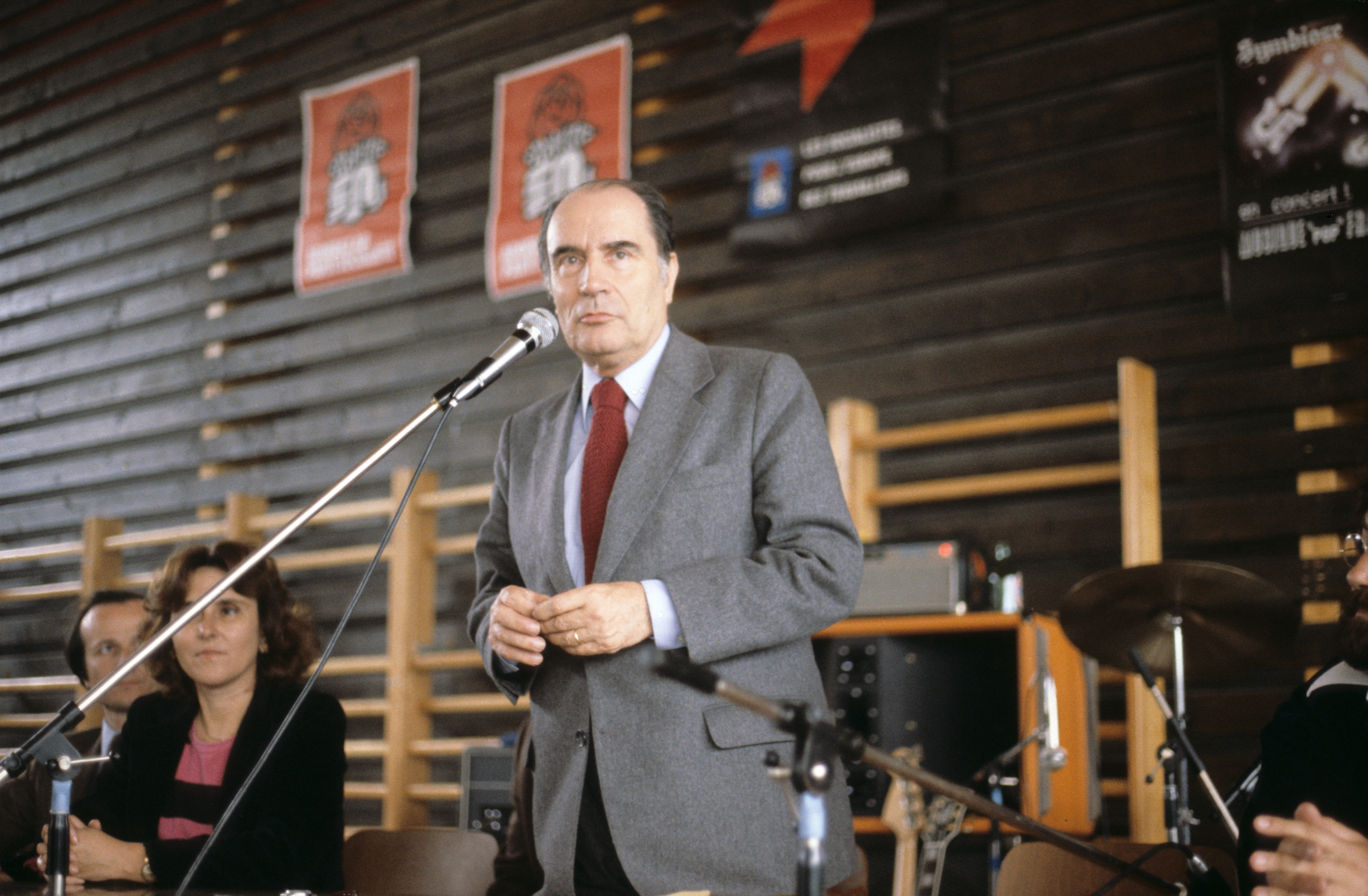
Mitterrand in Strasbourg on 5 May 1979

At the 1974 presidential election, Mitterrand received 43.2% of the vote in the first round, as the common candidate of the left. He faced Valéry Giscard d'Estaing in the second round. During the national TV debate, Giscard d'Estaing criticised him as being "a man of the past", due to his long political career. Mitterrand was narrowly defeated by Giscard d'Estaing, Mitterrand receiving 49.19% and Giscard 50.81%.

In 1977, the Communist and Socialist parties failed to update the Common Programme, and then lost the 1978 legislative election. While the Socialists took the leading position on the left, by obtaining more votes than the Communists for the first time since 1936, the leadership of Mitterrand was challenged by an internal opposition led by Michel Rocard who criticized the programme of the PS as being "archaic" and "unrealistic". The polls indicated Rocard was more popular than Mitterrand. Nevertheless, Mitterrand won the vote at the Party's Metz Congress (1979) and Rocard renounced his candidacy for the 1981 presidential election.

For his third candidacy for the presidency, Mitterrand was not supported by the PCF but only by the PS. Mitterrand projected a reassuring image with the slogan "the quiet force". He campaigned for "another politics", based on the Socialist programme 110 Propositions for France, and denounced the performance of the incumbent president. Furthermore, he benefited from divisions in the right-wing majority. He obtained 25.85% of votes in the first round (against 15% for the PCF candidate Georges Marchais), then defeated President Giscard d'Estaing in the second round, with 51.76%. He became the first left-wing politician elected President of France by universal suffrage.

== Presidency ==
=== First term: 1981–1988 ===
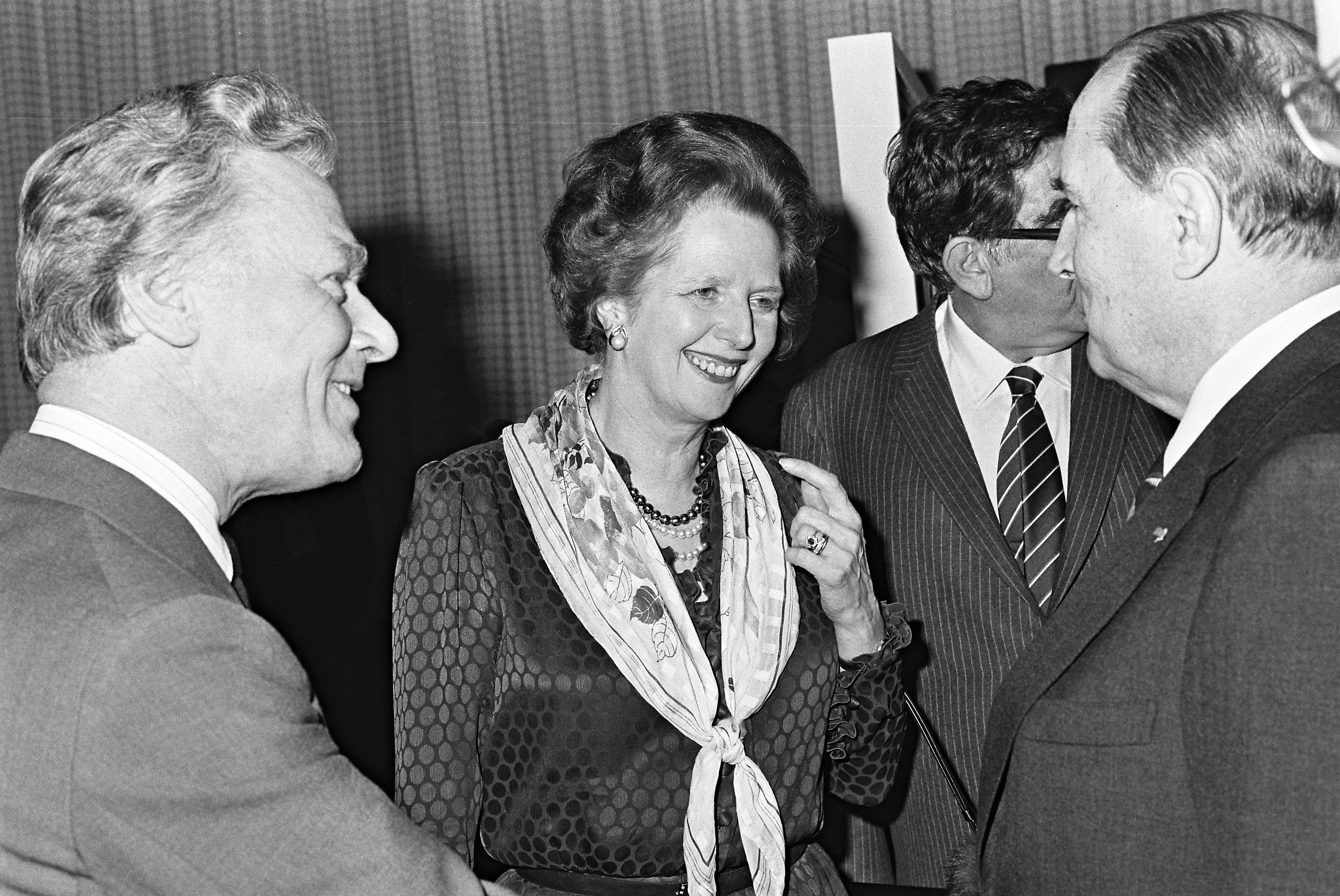
Mitterrand (right) with Danish Prime Minister Schlüter and British Prime Minister Thatcher, 1983

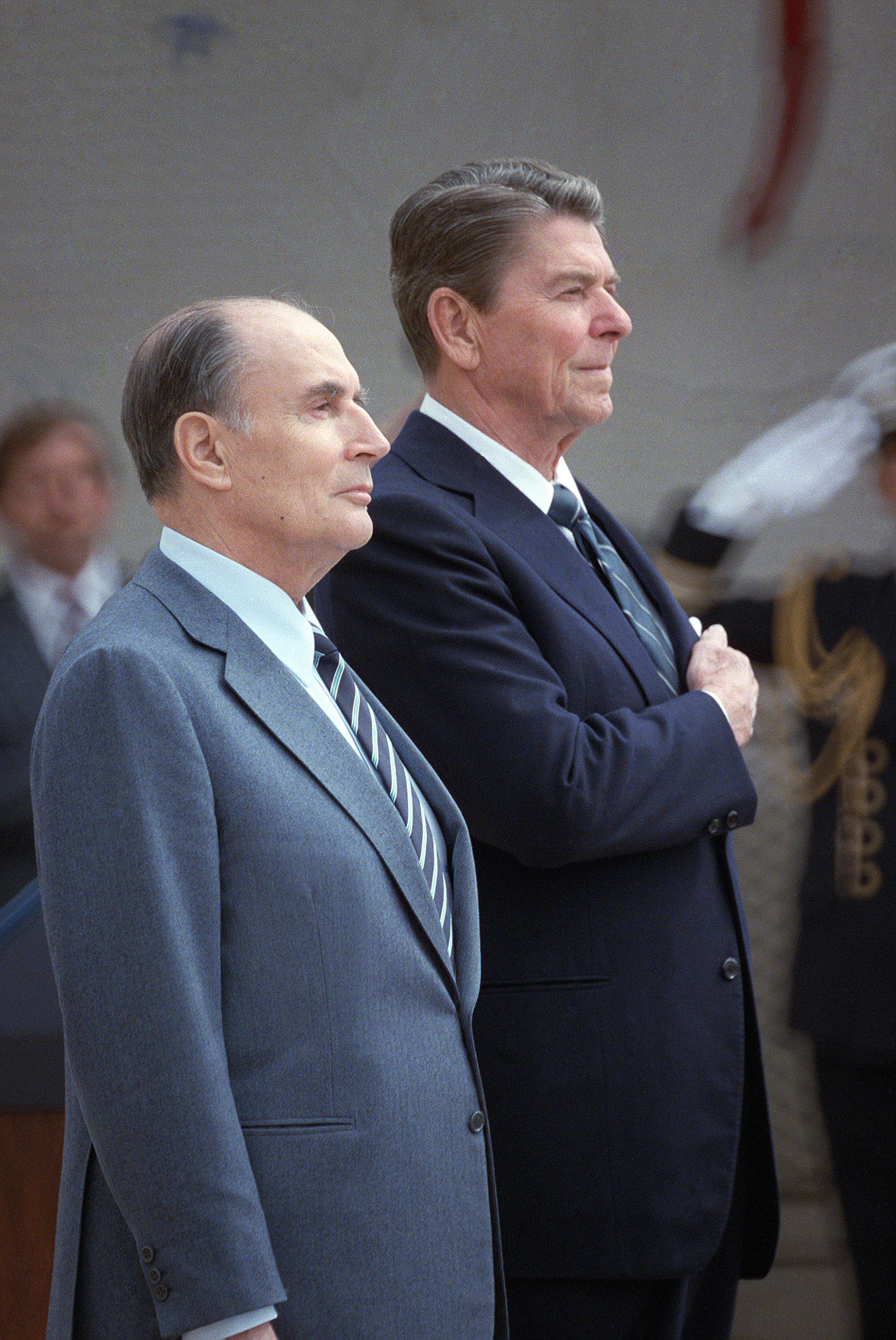
Mitterrand with U.S. President Ronald Reagan, 1984

In the presidential election of 10 May 1981, François Mitterrand became the first socialist President of the Fifth Republic, and his government became the first left-wing government in 23 years. He named Pierre Mauroy as prime minister and organised a new legislative election. The Socialists obtained an absolute parliamentary majority, and four Communists joined the cabinet.

==== Economic policy ====
The beginning of his first term was marked by a left-wing economic policy based on the 110 Propositions for France and the 1972 Common Programme between the Socialist Party, the Communist Party and the Left Radical Party. This included several nationalizations, a 10% increase in the SMIC (minimum wage), a 39-hour work week, 5 weeks holiday per year, the creation of the solidarity tax on wealth, an increase in social benefits, and the extension of workers' rights to consultation and information about their employers (through the Auroux Act). The objective was to boost economic demand and thus economic activity (Keynesianism), but the stimulative fiscal policy implemented by the Mauroy government was in contradiction with the constrained monetary policy implemented by the Bank of France. However, unemployment continued to grow, and the franc was devalued three times.

Old age pensions were raised by 300 francs per month to 1,700 francs for a single person and to 3,700 francs for a couple, while health insurance benefits were made more widely available to unemployed persons and part-time employees. Housing allocations for the low-paid were raised by 25% in 1981, and in the two years following May 1981 family allowances were increased by 44% for families with 3 children and by 81% for families with 2 children. In 1981, the purchasing power of social transfers went up by 4.5% and by 7.6% in 1982. In addition, the minimum wage (which affected 1.7 million employees) was increased by 15% in real terms between May 1981 and December 1982. Also, between 1981 and 1983, the basic pension benefit for elderly poor persons was raised by 62.%

Major efforts were made to improve access to housing and health care, while the government also attempted to tackle working-class under-achievement in schools by reinforcing the comprehensive system, modernising the curriculum and reducing streaming. As a means of increasing political participation, the government increased the financial allowances of local politicians, who also became entitled to paid leave from their jobs to attend courses in public administration. Allowances for the handicapped were improved, while improvements were also made in the pay and conditions for those serving in the army. A decree of January 1982 provided for "solidarity contracts" whereby firms would be subsidised for introducing part-time work or early retirement if they also allowed the creation of new jobs, while a decree of March 1982 provided employees with the right to retire at the age of 60 on 50% of average earnings during their 10 best years of employment. In 1983, legislation was passed to encourage greater equality in the private sector. Firms now had to make an annual report on the training opportunities and employment conditions for women and present a statistical analysis of their position in the firm, whilst the works committee had to ensure that equality-promoting measures were taken. In addition, a new benefit was introduced for unemployed workers who had exhausted their eligibility for unemployment insurance. In December 1982, a law was passed that restored to workers the right to elect administrators to social security funds, which had been eliminated by Charles De Gaulle in 1967.

Mitterrand continued to promote the new technologies initiated by his predecessor Valéry Giscard d'Estaing: the TGV high-speed train and the Minitel, a pre-World Wide Web interactive network similar to the web. The Minitel and the Paris-Lyon TGV line were inaugurated only a few weeks after the election. In addition, Government grants and loans for capital investment for modernisation were significantly increased. François Mitterrand passed the first decentralization laws, the Defferre Act.

After two years in office, Mitterrand made a substantial u-turn in economic policies, with the March 1983 adoption of the so-called "tournant de la rigueur" (austerity turn). Priority was given to the struggle against inflation in order to remain competitive in the European Monetary System. Although there were two periods of mild economic reflation (first from 1984 to 1986 and again from 1988 to 1990), monetary and fiscal restraint was the essential policy orientation of François Mitterrand's presidency from 1983 onwards. Nevertheless, compared to the OECD average, fiscal policy in France remained relatively expansionary during the course of the two François Mitterrand presidencies.

==== Social policy ====
In 1983, all members of the general pension scheme obtained the right to a full pension at the age of 60 payable at a rate of half the reference wage in return for 37.5 years contribution. The government agreed at the same time to improve the pension position of some public sector employees and to increase the real value of the minimum pension. In addition, later negotiations brought retirement at 60 years into the occupational schemes although the financial terms for doing so could only be agreed for a 7-year period. A comparison between 1981 and 1986 showed that the minimum state pension had increased by 64% for a couple and by 81% for one person. During that same period, family allowances had increased by 71% for three children and by 112% for two children. In addition, the single-parent allowance for mothers or fathers with one child had been increased by 103% and for two or more children by 52% for each child.

In order to mark the importance of the problems of the elderly, the government appointed a Secretary of State (attached to the Ministry of Social Affairs and National Solidarity) to carry special responsibility for them, and in an effort to try to relate policy to the felt needs of the elderly, it set up a central advisory committee to examine social policy from their point of view and carry out special studies and enquiries. This body became especially concerned with monitoring the attempts at coordination and encouraging policies which were aimed at helping the elderly stay at home instead of entering residential care.

In the field of health care, some prescription charges were abolished, hospital administration was decentralised, workers' rights in the health service were reaffirmed, and equipment was provided for researchers. From 1983 onwards, wage-earners who had contributed to a pension fund for 37.5 years became eligible to retire on a full pension. This right was extended to the self-employed in 1984 and to farmers in 1986. People who had retired at the age of 60 were, however, not initially eligible for reductions on public transport until they reached the age of 65. The qualifying age for these reductions was, however, reduced to 62 in 1985. A number of illegal immigrants had their position regularized under the Socialists and the conditions pertaining to residence and work permits were eased. Educational programmes were implemented to help immigrant communities, while immigrants were allowed the right to free association. The Socialist government also opened up talks with the authorities in some of the main countries of origin, easing nationality rules in the public sector, associating representatives of migrant groups with public authority work, and establishing an Immigrants Council in 1984.

Although the income limit for allowances varied according to the position of the child in the family and the number of dependent children, these ceilings were made more favourable in cases where both parents were working or where a single parent was in charge and were linked to changes in wage levels. Those taking parental leave to care for three or more children (provided that they fulfilled the rules for eligibility) also received certain benefits in kind, such as a non-taxable, non-means-tested benefit and priority on vocational training courses. A new boost was also given to research into family problems including an interest in the effects of changing family structures, of women’s employment and the impact of local social policies on family life. In addition, a law on equal opportunities in employment was passed in July 1983 which prohibited all forms of unequal treatment regardless of the circumstances, together with providing for positive action plans to be established in major companies. In January 1984, a decree was made granting state aid to companies which implemented equality plans for staff. That same year, a law was passed that gave the regional Caissess des Allocations Familiales the task of collecting unpaid alimony, initially for lone parents and subsequently for remarried or cohabiting mothers.

In the field of education, more resources were devoted to the educational system, with the education budgets of 1982, 1983, and 1984 increasing by approximately 4% to 6% per year above the rate of inflation. From 1981 to 1983, the corps of teachers was increased by 30,000. Authorization was restored for a number of advanced undergraduate and graduate programmes which the previous centre-right minister Alice Saunier-Seité had rejected on grounds of economy and "rationalization" of resources. Numerous initiatives were carried out such as the teaching of civics, the reintroduction of the teaching of French history and geography at the primary level, the introduction of new professional degrees, a partnership between schools and enterprises, and the introduction of computers in classrooms. Priority areas were set up in 1981 as part of a systematic effort to combat underachievement in schools, while technical education was encouraged. In addition, nursery education was expanded, while efforts by the Socialists to promote joint research between industry and the research agencies increased the number of such contracts by half each year between 1982 and 1985, with a 29% increase in joint patents. The baccalauréat professionnel, introduced in 1985, enabled holders of a Brevet d'études professionnelles (or in some cases of a Certificat d’aptitude professionnelle) to continue for another two years and study for the baccalauréat.

Several measures were taken to put an end to the discrimination of homosexuals and repeal legal practices that repressed them. The Minister of the Interior, Gaston Defferre, put an end to the registration of homosexuals, and the Communist Jack Ralite, Minister of Health, removed homosexuality from the list of mental disorders. The government also introduced the passage of the sexual majority to 15 years for all, abolishing the distinction, introduced in 1942, in the age of consent between homosexual and heterosexual relations. Homosexual lifestyle ceased to be a clause for cancellation of a residential lease.

Mitterrand abolished the death penalty as soon as he took office (via the Badinter Act), as well as the "anti-casseurs Act" which instituted collective responsibility for acts of violence during demonstrations. He also dissolved the Cour de sûreté, a special high court, and enacted a massive regularization of illegal immigrants. Tighter regulations on the powers of police to stop, search and arrest were introduced, and the "loi sécurité et liberté" (a controversial public order act) was repealed. In addition, the legal aid system was improved.

In 1984, a law was passed to ensure that divorced women who were not in receipt of maintenance would be provided with assistance in recovering the shortfall in their income from their former husband. By 1986, particular attention was being focused on assisting women in single-parent families to get back into employment, in recognition of the growing problems associated with extra-marital births and marital breakdown. Parental leave was extended to firms with 100 employees in 1981 (previously, parental leave provision had been made in 1977 for firms employing at least 200 employees) and subsequently to all employees in 1984. From 1984 onwards, married women were obliged to sign tax returns, men and women were provided with equal rights in managing their common property and that of their children, and in 1985 they became responsible for each other’s debts.

Childcare facilities were also expanded, with the number of places in crèches rising steadily between 1981 and 1986. In addition, the minimum wage was significantly increased. From 1981 to 1984, the SMIC rose by 125%, while prices went up by only 75% during that same period. Various measures were also introduced to mitigate the effects of rising unemployment. Between 1981 and 1986, there had been just over 800,000 young people placed on special work schemes, 800,000 early retirements, 200,000 enterprise allowance successes, and 30,000 retrained workers from declining industrial sectors.

==== Cultural policy ====
With respect to cultural policies, grants were allocated to non-profit associations and community cultural initiatives, Mitterrand liberalized the media, created the CSA media regulation agency, and authorized pirate radio and the first private TV (Canal+), giving rise to the private broadcasting sector.

In terms of the theatre, some transfer of resources was made from the subsidy of the national theatres to the support for theatre companies which did not necessarily have an institutional home. A significant investment was made in music education with the creation of 5 new music schools in the departments and the revamping of the Conservatoire National de la Musique at Lyon, while the range and capacity of performance facilities in Paris were considerably increased, with the Cite Musicale de la Villette and the Opera de la Bastille allowing for specialist performance in a way that was lacking in Paris previously, and a 2,000 seat concert hall called le Zenith, which was designed primarily for rock music concerts but adapted for all uses.

The Socialists continued the policies of their predecessors with the Grand Louvre project and the opening of the Picasso Museum at the Hotel Sale, while the museum budget was quadrupled and particular sums were set aside for the first time for large regional projects including the establishment of a number of new museums in the provinces such as the Ecomuseum at Chartres and the Museum of Prehistory at Carnac. A Fonds Regional des Acquisitions was established to assist provincial museums in the purchase of works of art, while the state actively continued an existing policy of encouraging bequests in lieu of death duties.

Libraries and publishing benefited from new thinking and an injection of funds, while aid to authors and publishers was restructured and book prices were fixed once again, with the objective being to assist smaller publishing houses and specialist bookshops. The network of regional lending libraries was significantly reinforced, while financial assistance was provided for the export of French books. In addition, archaeology, ethnography and historical buildings and monuments all benefited from the general increase in resources.

==== Domestic difficulties ====
The Left lost the 1983 municipal elections and the 1984 European Parliament election. At the same time, the Savary Bill, to limit the financing of private schools by local communities, caused a political crisis. It was abandoned and Mauroy resigned in July 1984. Laurent Fabius succeeded him, and the Communists left the cabinet.

In terms of foreign policy, Mitterrand did not significantly deviate from his predecessors and he continued nuclear weapons testing in the South Pacific in spite of protests from various peace and environmentalist organizations. In July 1985, French agents sank the Greenpeace-owned ex-trawler Rainbow Warrior while it was docked in Auckland, New Zealand which the group had used in demonstrations against nuclear tests, whaling, and seal hunting. One Greenpeace member was killed, and when news broke of the event, a major scandal erupted that led to the resignation of Defence Minister Charles Hernu. France apologized with a subsequent payment of $8.16m reparations to Greenpeace in damages, NZ$13m to the New Zealand Government and a significant amount to the relatives of the deceased.

==== First Cohabitation ====
Before the 1986 legislative campaign, proportional representation was instituted in accordance with the 110 Propositions. It did not prevent, however, the victory of the Rally for the Republic/Union for French Democracy (RPR/UDF) coalition. François Mitterrand thus named the RPR leader Jacques Chirac as Prime Minister. This period of government, with a President and a Prime Minister who came from two opposite coalitions, was the first time that such a combination had occurred under the Fifth Republic, and came to be known as "Cohabitation".

Chirac mostly handled domestic policy while Mitterrand concentrated on his "reserved domain" of foreign affairs and defence. However, several conflicts erupted between the two. In one example, Mitterrand refused to sign executive decrees of liberalisation, obliging Chirac to pass the measures through parliament instead. François Mitterrand also reportedly gave covert support to some social movements, notably the student revolt against the university reform (Devaquet Bill). Benefiting from the difficulties of Chirac's cabinet, the President's popularity increased.

With the polls running in his favour, Mitterrand announced his candidacy in the 1988 presidential election. He proposed a moderate programme (promising "neither nationalisation nor privatization"), advocated a "united France," and laid out his policy priorities in his "Letter to the French People." He obtained 34% of the votes in the first round, then faced Chirac in the second, and was re-elected with 54% of the votes. Mitterrand thus became the first President to be elected twice by universal suffrage.

=== Second term: 1988–1995 ===
==== Domestic policy ====
Following his re-election, he named Michel Rocard as prime minister, despite their poor relations. Rocard led the moderate wing of the PS and he was the most popular of the Socialist politicians. Mitterrand decided to organize a new legislative election. The PS obtained a relative parliamentary majority. Four centre-right politicians joined the cabinet.

The second term was marked by the creation of the Insertion Minimum Revenue (RMI), which ensured a minimum level of income to those deprived of any other form of income; the restoring of the solidarity tax on wealth, which had been abolished by Chirac's cabinet; the institution of the Generalized social tax; the extension of parental leave up to the child's third birthday; the reform of the Common Agricultural Policy; the 1990 Gayssot Act on hate speech and Holocaust denial; the Besson law of 1990; the Mermaz Law of 1989; the introduction of a private childcare allowance; the Urban Orientation Law of 1991; the Arpaillange Act on the financing of political parties; the reform of the penal code; the Matignon Agreements concerning New Caledonia; the Evin Act on smoking in public places; the extension of the age limit for family allowances to 18 years in 1990; and the 1989 Education Act which, amongst other measures, obliged local authorities to educate all children with disabilities. Several large architectural works were pursued, in what would become known as the Grands Projets of François Mitterrand with the building of the Louvre Pyramid, the Channel Tunnel, the Grande Arche at La Défense, the Bastille Opera, the Finance Ministry in Bercy, and the National Library of France. On 16 February 1993, President François Mitterrand inaugurated in Fréjus a memorial to the wars in Indochina.

But the second term was also marked by rivalries within the PS and the split of the Mitterrandist group (at the Rennes Congress, where supporters of Laurent Fabius and Lionel Jospin clashed bitterly for control of the party), the scandals about the financing of the party, the contaminated blood scandal which implicated Laurent Fabius and former ministers Georgina Dufoix and Emond Hervé, and the Elysée wiretaps affairs.

==== Second Cohabitation ====
Disappointed with Rocard's apparent failure to enact the Socialists' programme, Mitterrand dismissed Michel Rocard in 1991 and appointed Édith Cresson to replace him. She was the first woman to become prime minister in France but proved a costly mistake due to her tendency to make acerbic and racist public remarks. After the Socialists experienced heavy losses in the 1992 regional elections, Cresson resigned from office. Her successor Pierre Bérégovoy promised to fight unemployment and corruption but he could not prevent the catastrophic defeat of the left in the 1993 legislative election. The Socialist Party suffered a crushing defeat with the right-wing parties winning 485 seats to the left's 95. He killed himself on 1 May 1993.

Mitterrand named the former RPR Finance Minister Edouard Balladur as Prime Minister. The second "cohabitation" was less contentious than the first, because the two men knew they were not rivals for the next presidential election. By this point, Mitterrand was nearly 80 years old and suffering from cancer in addition to the shock of his friend François de Grossouvre's suicide. His second and last term ended after the 1995 presidential election in May 1995 with the election of Jacques Chirac. Socialist candidate Lionel Jospin lost the presidential election.

Overall, as President, Mitterrand maintained the "basic characteristic of a strong welfare base underpinned by a strong state." A United Nations Human Development report concluded that, from 1979 to 1989, France was the only country in the OECD (apart from Portugal) in which income inequalities did not get worse. During his second term as president, however, the gap between rich and poor widened in France, with both unemployment and poverty rising in the wake of the economic recession of 1991–1993. According to other studies, though, the percentage of the French population living in poverty (based on various criteria) fell between the mid-Eighties and the mid-Nineties.

=== Foreign policy ===
According to Wayne Northcutt, certain domestic circumstances helped shape Mitterrand's foreign policy in four ways: he needed to maintain a political consensus; he kept an eye on economic conditions; he believed in the nationalistic imperative for French policy; and he tried to exploit Gaullism and its heritage for political advantage.

==== East/West relations ====
François Mitterrand supported closer European collaboration and the preservation of France's unique relationship with its former colonies, which he feared were falling under "Anglo-Saxon influence." His drive to preserve French power in Africa led to controversies concerning Paris' role during the Rwandan genocide.

Despite Mitterrand's left-wing affiliations, the 1980s saw France becoming more distant from the USSR, especially following events such as the expulsion of 47 Soviet diplomats and their families from the country in 1982 after they were accused of large-scale industrial and military espionage. François Mitterrand also sharply criticized the Soviet intervention in Afghanistan as well as the country's nuclear weapons buildup. When François Mitterrand visited the USSR in November 1988, the Soviet media claimed to be 'leaving aside the virtually wasted decade and losing the Soviet-French 'special relationship' of the Gaullist era'.

Nevertheless, Mitterrand was worried by the rapidity of the Eastern bloc's collapse. He was opposed to German reunification but came to see it as unavoidable. He was opposed to the swift recognition of Croatia and Slovenia, which he thought would lead to the violent implosion of Yugoslavia.

France participated in the Gulf War (1990–1991) with the U.N. coalition.

==== European policy ====
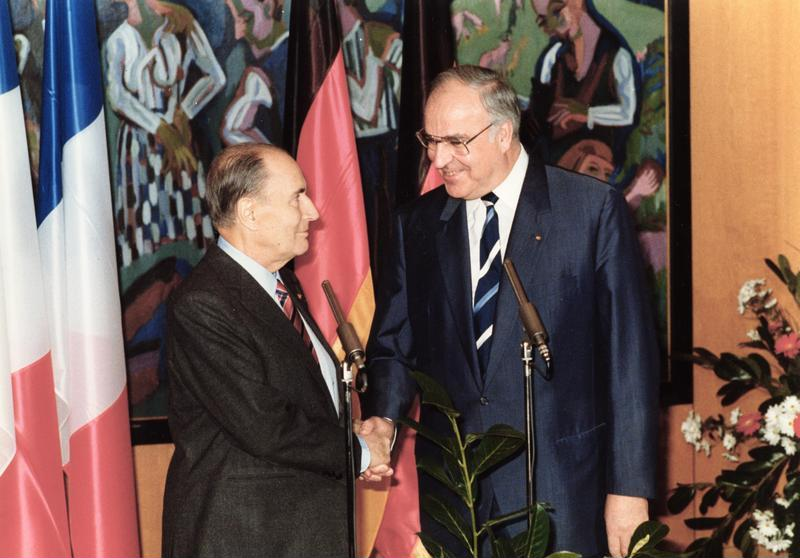
Mitterrand and German Chancellor Kohl, 1987

He initially opposed further membership, fearing the Community was not ready and it would water it down to a free trade area. Mitterrand supported the enlargement of the Community to include Spain and Portugal (which both joined in January 1986). In February 1986 he helped the Single European Act come into effect. He worked well with his friend Helmut Kohl and improved Franco-German relations significantly. Together they fathered the Maastricht Treaty, which was signed on 7 February 1992. It was ratified by referendum, and approved by just over 51% of the voters. British Prime Minister Margaret Thatcher was against a German reunification and also against the then discussed Maastricht Treaty. When Kohl, then West German Chancellor, asked François Mitterrand to agree to reunification (France was one of the four Allies who had to agree to the Two Plus Four-treaty), François Mitterrand told Kohl he accepted it only in the event Germany would abandon the Deutsche Mark and adopt the Euro. Kohl accepted this package deal (including without talking to Karl Otto Pöhl, then President of the Bundesbank). That year, he also established the Mitterrand doctrine, a policy of not extraditing convicted far-left terrorists of the years of lead such as Cesare Battisti to Italy, due to the alleged non-conformity of Italian legislation to European standards of rule of law, in particular the anti-terrorism laws passed by Italy in the 1970s and 1980s. When the European Court of Human Rights finally ruled against the François Mitterrand doctrine, the policy had already led to most of the criminals never being punished for their crimes.

==== 1990 speech at La Baule ====
Responding to a democratic movement in Africa after the 1989 fall of the Berlin Wall, he made his La Baule speech in June 1990 which tied development aid to democratic efforts from former French colonies, and during which he opposed the devaluation of the CFA Franc. Seeing an "East wind" blowing in the former Soviet Union and Eastern Europe, he stated that a "Southern wind" was also blowing in Africa, and that state leaders had to respond to the populations' wishes and aspirations by a "democratic opening", which included a representative system, free elections, multipartyism, freedom of the press, an independent judiciary, and abolition of censorship. Claiming that France was the country making the most important effort concerning development aid, he announced that the least developed countries (LDCs) would henceforth receive only grants from France, as opposed to loans (in order to combat the massive increase of Third World debt during the 1980s). He likewise limited the interest rate to 5% on French loans to intermediate-income countries (that is, Ivory Coast, Congo, Cameroon and Gabon).

He also criticized interventionism in sovereign matters, which was according to him only another form of "colonialism". However, according to Mitterrand, this did not imply lessened concern on the part of Paris for its former colonies. Mitterrand thus continued with the African policy of de Gaulle inaugurated in 1960, which followed the relative failure of the 1958 creation of the French Community. All in all, Mitterrand's La Baule speech, which marked a relative turning point in France's policy concerning its former colonies, has been compared with the 1956 loi-cadre Defferre which was responding to anti-colonialist feelings.

African heads of state reacted to Mitterrand's speech at most with indifference. Omar Bongo, President of Gabon, declared that he would rather have "events counsel him;" Abdou Diouf, President of Senegal, said that, according to him, the best solution was a "strong government" and a "good faith opposition;" the President of Chad, Hissène Habré (nicknamed the "African Pinochet") claimed that it was contradictory to demand that African states should simultaneously carry on a "democratic policy" and "social and economic policies which limited their sovereignty", in a clear allusion to the International Monetary Fund and the World Bank's "structural adjustment programs". Hassan II, the king of Morocco, said for his part that "Africa was too open to the world to remain indifferent to what was happening around it", but that Western countries should "help young democracies open out, without putting a knife under their throat, without a brutal transition to multipartyism."

All in all, the La Baule speech has been said to be on one hand "one of the foundations of political renewal in Africa French speaking area", and on the other hand "cooperation with France", this despite "incoherence and inconsistency, like any public policy".

==== Discovery of HIV ====
The controversy surrounding the discovery of the Human Immunodeficiency Virus (HIV) was intense after American researcher Robert Gallo and French scientist Luc Montagnier both claimed to have discovered it. The two scientists had given the new virus different names. The controversy was eventually settled by an agreement (helped along by the mediation of Dr Jonas Salk) between President Ronald Reagan and François Mitterrand which gave equal credit to both men and their teams.

==== Apology to the Huguenots ====
In October 1985, to commemorate the tricentenary of the Revocation of the Edict of Nantes, Mitterrand gave a formal apology to the descendants of Huguenots around the world. At the same time, a special postage stamp was released in their honour. The stamp states that France is the home of the Huguenots ("Accueil des Huguenots"). Hence their rights were finally recognised.

==== Co-Prince of Andorra ====
On 2 February 1993, in his capacity as co-prince of Andorra, Mitterrand and Joan Martí Alanis, who was Bishop of Urgell and therefore Andorra's other co-prince, signed Andorra's new constitution, which was later approved by referendum in the principality.

== Death ==
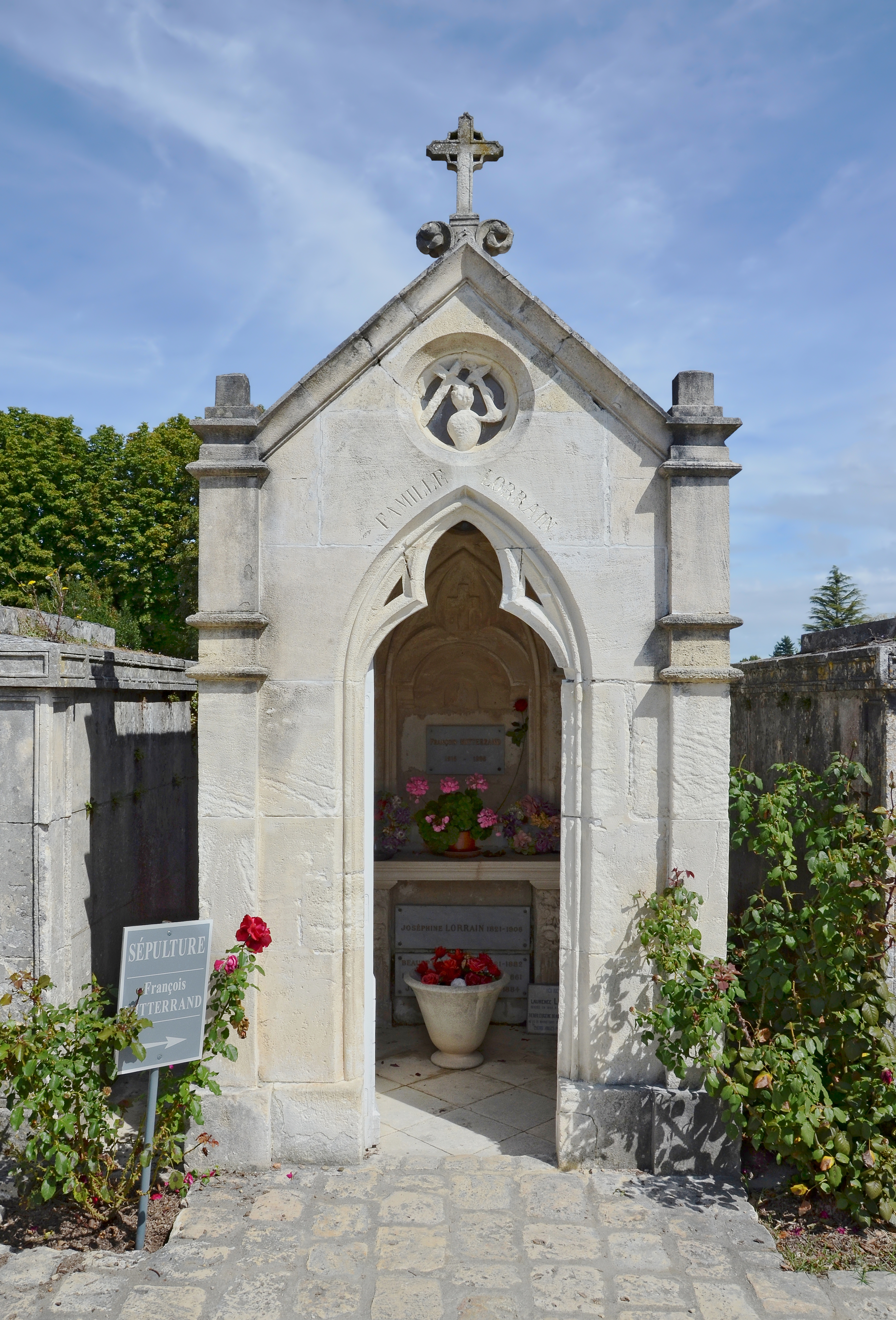
Mitterrand's tomb

Mitterrand died in Paris on 8 January 1996 at the age of 79 from prostate cancer, a condition he and his doctors had concealed for most of his presidency (see section on "Medical secrecy" below). A few days before his death, he was joined by family members and close friends for a "last meal" that attracted controversy because, in addition to other gourmet dishes, it included the serving of roast ortolan bunting, a small wild songbird that is a protected species whose sale was and remains illegal in France.

=== Funeral ===
The day of the funeral was declared a national day of mourning. A requiem mass was held at Notre-Dame cathedral, celebrated by Cardinal Lustiger in the presence of UN Secretary General Boutros Boutros-Ghali, EU President Jacques Santer and representatives from 171 countries. Daniel Tarschys, Secretary General of the Council of Europe, former president of the European Commission Jacques Delors and Simone Veil were present. Jacques Chirac, President of France, Alain Juppé, Prime Minister of France, former president Valéry Giscard d'Estaing and former prime ministers Édouard Balladur, Jacques Chaban-Delmas, Laurent Fabius, Maurice Couve de Murville, Michel Rocard, Pierre Mauroy, Édith Cresson were present. Sixty-one heads of state were presented.

François Mitterrand's grave is in Jarnac.

Former leaders and foreign delegations who attended François Mitterrand's funeral included:

- Sali Berisha, President of Albania
- (Algeria) Ahmed Attaf, Minister of Foreign Affairs
- Marc Forné Molné, Prime Minister of Andorra
- Levon Ter-Petrossian, President of Armenia
- Paul Keating, Prime Minister of Australia
- (Australia) Gareth Evans, Minister of Foreign Affairs
- Thomas Klestil, President of Austria
- Heydar Aliyev, President of Azerbaijan
- (Bahrain) Mohammed bin Mubarak Al Khalifa, Minister of Foreign Affairs
- (Bangladesh) A. M. Zahiruddin Khan, former Minister of Industry
- (Belarus) Piatro Kravchanka, former Minister of Foreign Affairs
- (Belgium) Albert II, King of the Belgians
- (Belgium) Paola, Queen of the Belgians
- Jean-Luc Dehaene, Prime Minister of Belgium
- (Belgium) Elio Di Rupo, Vice-Prime Minister
- Nicéphore Soglo, President of Benin
- (Bosnia and Herzegovina) Yves Gaudeul, Ambassador of France in Bosnia
- (Botswana) Mompati Merafhe, Minister of Foreign Affairs
- José Sarney, former president of Brazil and President of the Senate
- Zhelyu Zhelev, President of Bulgaria
- (Burundi) Vénérand Bakevyumusaya, Minister of Foreign Affairs
- Norodom Sihanouk, King of Cambodia
- Norodom Monineath, Queen of Cambodia
- Roméo LeBlanc, Governor General of Canada
- (Canada) Sheila Copps, Deputy Prime Minister
- Brian Mulroney, former Prime Minister of Canada
- (Canada) Jacques Parizeau, Premier of Quebec
- (Canada) André Ouellet, Minister of Foreign Affairs
- (Canada) Louise Beaudoin, Minister of Culture and Communications of Quebec
- Benoît Bouchard, Ambassador of Canada to France
- (Canada) Claude Roquet, Delegate General of Quebec
- Ange-Félix Patassé, President of the Central African Republic
- Idriss Déby, President of Chad
- Gabriel Valdés Subercaseaux, President of the Senate of Chile
- (China) Qian Qichen, Vice Premier
- (Republic of the Congo) Pascal Lissouba, President of Congo
- Franjo Tuđman, President of Croatia
- Fidel Castro, President of Cuba
- Glafcos Clerides, President of Cyprus
- Václav Havel, President of the Czech Republic
- Margrethe II, Queen of Denmark
- Prince Henrik of Denmark
- Poul Nyrup Rasmussen, Prime Minister of Denmark
- Hosni Mubarak, President of Egypt
- Lennart Meri, President of Estonia
- Martti Ahtisaari, President of Finland
- (Federal Republic of Yugoslavia) Milan Milutinović Minister of Foreign Affairs
- Omar Bongo, President of Gabon
- (The Gambia) Sana B. Sabaly, Vice-President of the Gambia
- Roman Herzog, President of Germany
- Helmut Kohl, Chancellor of Germany
- (Germany) Oskar Lafontaine, Leader of the Social Democratic Party
- Constantinos Stephanopoulos, President of Greece
- (Guinea) Kozo Zoumanigui, Minister of Foreign Affairs
- João Bernardo Vieira, President of Guinea-Bissau
- (Haiti) Jean-Bertrand Aristide, President of Haïti
- (Holy See) Bishop Jean-Louis Tauran, Secretary for Relations with States
- Carlos Roberto Reina, President of Honduras
- Árpád Göncz, President of Hungary
- Vigdís Finnbogadóttir, President of Iceland
- (Iran) Ali Akbar Velayati, Minister of Foreign Affairs
- (Republic of Ireland) John Bruton, Prime Minister of Ireland
- Ezer Weizman, President of Israel
- Shimon Peres, Prime Minister of Israel
- Oscar Luigi Scalfaro, President of Italy
- Henri Konan Bédié, President of Ivory Coast
- Noboru Takeshita, former Prime Minister of Japan
- Hassan, Crown Prince of Jordan
- (Kazakhstan) Kassym-Jomart Tokayev, Minister of Foreign Affairs
- Guntis Ulmanis, President of Latvia
- Elias Hrawi, President of Lebanon
- (Liberia) Momolu Sirleaf, Minister of Foreign Affairs
- Prince Nikolaus of Liechtenstein
- Otmar Hasler, Prime Minister of Liechtenstein
- Algirdas Brazauskas, President of Lithuania
- Jean, Grand Duke of Luxembourg
- Joséphine-Charlotte, Grand Duchess of Luxembourg
- Jean-Claude Juncker, Prime Minister of Luxembourg
- (North Macedonia) Branko Crvenkovski, Prime Minister of Macedonia
- Alpha Oumar Konaré, President of Mali
- Ugo Mifsud Bonnici, President of Malta
- (Mauritania) Cheikh El Avia Ould Mohamed Khouna, Minister of Foreign Affairs
- Cassam Uteem, President of Mauritius
- (Mexico) José Ángel Gurría, Secretary of Foreign Affairs
- Rainier III, Prince of Monaco
- Sidi Mohammed, Crown Prince of Morocco
- Sam Nujoma, President of Namibia
- Javier Solana, Secretary General of NATO
- Beatrix, Queen of the Netherlands
- Wim Kok, Prime Minister of the Netherlands
- Mahamane Ousmane, President of Niger
- Gro Harlem Bruntland, Prime Minister of Norway
- (Oman) Yusuf bin Alawi bin Abdullah, Minister Responsible for Foreign Affairs
- (Pakistan) Aftab Shaban Mirani, Minister of Defence
- Yasser Arafat, President of the State of Palestine
- (Paraguay) Luis María Ramírez Boettner, Minister of Foreign Affairs
- Corazon Aquino, former president of the Philippines
- Aleksander Kwaśniewski, President of Poland
- António Guterres, Prime Minister of Portugal
- Hamad bin Khalifa Al Thani, Emir of Qatar
- Ion Iliescu, President of Romania
- Boris Yeltsin, President of Russia
- Naina Yeltsina, First Lady of Russia
- Jean-Bernard Mérimée, Ambassador of San Marino to France
- (Saudi Arabia) Ibrahim Abdulaziz Al-Assaf, Minister of Finance
- Abdou Diouf, President of Senegal
- Michal Kováč, President of Slovakia
- Janez Drnovšek, Prime Minister of Slovenia
- Ali Mahdi Muhammad, President of Somalia
- (South Africa) Alfred Baphethuxolo Nzo, Minister of Foreign Affairs
- (South Korea) Gong Ro-myung, Minister of Foreign Affairs
- Juan Carlos I, King of Spain
- Sofia, Queen of Spain
- Felipe González, Prime Minister of Spain
- (Sri Lanka) Lakshman Kadirgamar, Minister of Foreign Affairs
- Carl XVI Gustaf, King of Sweden
- (Switzerland) Adolf Ogi, former president of the Swiss Confederation
- Gnassingbé Eyadema, President of Togo
- Süleyman Demirel, President of Turkey
- Leonid Kuchma, President of Ukraine
- Zayed bin Sultan Al Nahyan, President of the United Arab Emirates
- (United Kingdom) Charles, Prince of Wales
- John Major, Prime Minister of United Kingdom
- Al Gore, Vice President of the United States
- (Uruguay) Álvaro Ramos Trigo, Minister of Foreign Affairs
- Ali Abdallah Saleh, President of Yemen
- Godfrey Miyanda, Vice-President of Zambia

== Prime ministers during presidency ==
As of 2025, François Mitterrand has had the most prime ministers during the history of the 5th Republic, along with Emmanuel Macron, both at 7.

Prime minister	In office		Party	Notes
Pierre Mauroy	1981	1984	Socialist	
Laurent Fabius	1984	1986	Socialist	The youngest PM since Decazes (37 years old)
Jacques Chirac	1986	1988	RPR	First cohabitation of the Fifth Republic
Michel Rocard	1988	1991	Socialist	
Édith Cresson	1991	1992	Socialist	First female prime minister
Pierre Bérégovoy	1992	1993	Socialist	
Édouard Balladur	1993	1995	RPR	Second Cohabitation

== Controversies ==
=== Medical secrecy ===
Following his death, a controversy erupted when his former physician, Claude Gubler, wrote a book called Le Grand Secret ('The Big Secret') explaining that François Mitterrand had ordered false health reports published since November 1981, hiding his cancer by ordering that it be a state secret, before it was publicly revealed in 1992. Moreover, Gubler argued, Mitterrand was incapable of, and allegedly uninterested in, fulfilling his presidential duties in the last six months of his presidency, a claim former Mitterrand aides rejected. François Mitterrand's family then prosecuted Gubler and his publisher for violating medical confidentiality and demanded that the book be banned. Gubler was eventually handed a four-month suspended sentence in 1996 and, in November 1999, was stripped of his Legion of Honour for breaking his medical oath.

=== Urba ===
The Urba consultancy was established in 1971 by the Socialist Party to advise Socialist-led communes on infrastructure projects and public works. The Urba affair became public in 1989 when two police officers investigating the Marseille regional office of Urba discovered detailed minutes of the organisation's contracts, which showed a division of proceeds between the party and elected officials. Although the minutes proved a direct link between Urba and corrupt payments to politicians, an edict from the office of François Mitterrand (even though he himself was listed as a recipient) prevented further investigation. The François Mitterrand election campaign of 1988 was directed by Henri Nallet, who then became Justice Minister and therefore in charge of the investigation at the national level. In 1990 François Mitterrand declared an amnesty for those under investigation, thus ending the affair. Socialist Party treasurer Henri Emmanuelli was tried in 1997 for corruption offences, for which he received a two-year suspended sentence.

=== Wiretaps ===
From 1982 to 1986, Mitterrand established an "anti-terror cell" installed as a service of the President of the Republic. This was an unusual set-up since such law enforcement missions against terrorism are normally left to the National Police and Gendarmerie, run under the cabinet and the Prime Minister, and under the supervision of the judiciary. The cell was largely staffed by members of these services, but it bypassed the normal line of command and safeguards. Three thousand conversations concerning 150 people (7 for reasons judged to be contestable by the ensuing court process) were recorded between January 1983 and March 1986 by this anti-terrorist cell at the Elysée Palace. In one of its first actions, the cell was involved in the "Irish of Vincennes" affair, in which it appeared that members of the cell had planted weapons and explosives in the Vincennes apartment of three Irish nationals who were arrested on terrorism charges. Most markedly, it appears that the cell, under illegal presidential orders, obtained wiretaps on journalists, politicians and other personalities who may have been an impediment to Mitterrand's personal life. The illegal wiretapping was revealed in 1993 by Libération; the case against members of the cell went to trial in November 2004.

It took 20 years for the affaire to come before the courts because the instructing judge Jean-Paul Vallat was at first thwarted by the affaire being classed a defence secret, but in December 1999 the Commission consultative du secret de la défense nationale declassified part of the files concerned. The judge finished his investigation in 2000, but it still took another four years before coming on 15 November 2004 before the 16th chamber of the Tribunal correctionnel de Paris. Twelve people were charged with "atteinte à la vie privée" (breach of privacy) and one with selling computer files. Seven were given suspended sentences and fines and 4 were found not guilty.

The affair finally ended before the Tribunal correctionnel de Paris with the court's judgement on 9 November 2005. Seven members of the President's anti-terrorist unit were convicted and Mitterrand was designated as the "inspirator and essentially the controller of the operation."

The court's judgement revealed that Mitterrand was motivated by keeping elements of his private life secret from the general public, such as the existence of his illegitimate daughter Mazarine Pingeot (which the writer Jean-Edern Hallier, was threatening to reveal), his cancer which had been diagnosed in 1981, and the elements of his past in the Vichy Régime which were not already public knowledge. The court judged that certain people were tapped for "obscure" reasons, such as Carole Bouquet's companion, a lawyer with family in the Middle East, Edwy Plenel, a journalist for Le Monde who covered the Rainbow Warrior story and the Vincennes Three affair, and the lawyer Antoine Comte. The court declared "Les faits avaient été commis sur ordre soit du président de la République, soit des ministres de la Défense successifs qui ont mis à la disposition de (Christian Prouteau) tous les moyens de l'État afin de les exécuter" (translation: these actions were committed following orders from the French President or his various Defence Ministers who gave Christian Prouteau full access to the state machinery so he could execute the orders) The court stated that François Mitterrand was the principal instigator of the wire taps (l'inspirateur et le décideur de l'essentiel) and that he had ordered some of the taps and turned a blind eye to others and that none of the 3000 wiretaps carried out by the cell were legally obtained.

On 13 March 2007 the Court of Appeal in Paris awarded a symbolic €1 in damages to the actress Carole Bouquet and €5000 to Lieutenant-Colonel Jean-Michel Beau for breach of privacy.

The case was taken to the European Court of Human Rights, which gave judgement on 7 June 2007 that the rights of free expression of the journalists involved in the case were not respected.

In 2008 the French state was ordered by the courts to give Jean-Edern Hallier's family compensation.

=== Rwanda ===
Paris assisted Rwanda's president Juvénal Habyarimana, who was assassinated on 6 April 1994 while travelling in a Dassault Falcon 50 given to him as a personal gift of François Mitterrand. Through the offices of the 'Cellule Africaine', a Presidential office headed by François Mitterrand's son, Jean-Christophe Mitterrand, he provided the Hutu regime with financial and military support in the early 1990s. With French assistance, the Rwandan army grew from a force of 9,000 men in October 1990 to 28,000 in 1991. France also provided training staff, experts and massive quantities of weaponry and facilitated arms contracts with Egypt and South Africa. It also financed, armed and trained Habyrimana's Presidential Guard. French troops were deployed under Opération Turquoise, a military operation carried out under a United Nations (UN) mandate. The operation is currently the object of political and historical debate.

=== Bombing of the Rainbow Warrior ===
On 10 July 1985, the Rainbow Warrior, a Greenpeace vessel, was in New Zealand preparing to protest against French nuclear testing in the South Pacific when two explosions sank the ship, resulting in the death of freelance photographer Fernando Pereira. The New Zealand government called the bombing the first terrorist attack in the country. In mid-1985, French Defence Minister Charles Hernu was forced to resign after New Zealand authorities arrested DGSE (French intelligence services) agents who confessed to planting the explosives and later pleaded guilty.

On the twentieth anniversary of the sinking, it was revealed that Mitterrand had personally authorised the mission. Admiral Pierre Lacoste, the former head of the DGSE, made a statement saying Pereira's death weighed heavily on his conscience. Television New Zealand (TVNZ) also sought access to the court video recording hearing where two French agents pleaded guilty, which they won a year later.

== Political career ==
President of the French Republic: 1981–1995. Reelected in 1988.

Governmental functions

- Minister of Veterans and War Victims: 1947–1948
- Secretary of State for Information: July–September 1948
- Secretary of State for Presidency of Council: 1948–1949
- Minister of Overseas and Colonies: 1950–1951
- Minister of State: January–March 1952
- Minister for Council of Europe: June–September 1953
- Minister of Interior: 1954–1955
- Minister of State, minister of Justice: 1956–1957

Elected positions

National Assembly of France

Member of the National Assembly of France for Nièvre: 1946–1958 / 1962–1981 (resignation, became President of the French Republic in 1981). Elected in 1946, reelected in 1951, 1956, 1962, 1967, 1968, 1973, 1978.

Senate of France

Senator of Nièvre: 1959–1962 (resignation, reelected member of the National Assembly of France in 1962). Elected in 1959.

General Council

President of the General Council of Nièvre: 1964–1981 (resignation, became President of the French Republic in 1981). Reelected in 1967, 1970, 1973, 1976, 1979.

General councillor of Nièvre: 1949–1981 (resignation). Reelected in 1955, 1961, 1967, 1973, 1979.

Municipal Council

Mayor of Château-Chinon (Ville): 1959–1981 (resignation, became President of the French Republic in 1981). Reelected in 1965, 1971, 1977.

Municipal councillor of Château-Chinon (Ville): 1959–1981 (resignation). Reelected in 1965, 1971, 1977.

Political function

First Secretary (leader) of the Socialist Party: 1971–1981 (resignation, became President of the French Republic in 1981). Reelected in 1973, 1975, 1977, 1979.

From 1962 to 1964 and, again, from 1969 to 1971, he was the Grand Master of the Grand Orient de France. In May 1987, Mitterrand was also the first French president to receive a representative of that organization at the Élysée Palace.

== Honours ==
=== France ===
- Grand Cross (21 May 1981, automatic upon office) & Grand Master of the Legion of Honour (1981 – 1995)
- Grand Cross (21 May 1981, automatic upon office) & Grand Master of the Ordre national du Mérite (1981 – 1995)
- Order of the Francisque
- Croix de Guerre 1939-1945
- Resistance Medal

=== Foreign honours ===
François Mitterrand coat of arms as a knight of the Swedish Order of the Seraphim

- Mexico: Collar of the Order of the Aztec Eagle (19 October 1981)
- Denmark: Knight of the Order of the Elephant (1982)
- Spain: Knight of the Collar of the Order of Isabella the Catholic (1982)
- Finland: Collar of the Order of the White Rose (1982)
- Japan: Grand Collar of the Order of the Chrysanthemum (1982)
- Niger: Grand Cross of the National Order (20 May 1982)
- Senegal: Grand Cross of the National Order of the Lion (22 May 1982)
- Austria: Grand Star of the Decoration of Honour for Services to the Republic of Austria (June 1982)
- Lebanon: Grand Cordon of the Order of Merit (1982)
- Italy: Knight Grand Cross with Collar of the Order of Merit of the Italian Republic (July 1982)
- Morocco: Special Class of the Order of Muhammad (1983)
- Belgium: Grand Cordon of the Order of Leopold (1983)
- Burundi: Grand Cross of the National Order of the Republic (1983)
- Cameroon: Grand Cross of the Order of Valor (1983)
- Cameroon: Grand Cross of the Cameroonian Order of Merit
- Benin: Grand Cross of the National Order (1983)
- Togo: Grand Cross of the Order of Mono (1983)
- Yugoslavia: Great Star of the Order of the Yugoslav Star (December 1983)
- Tunisia: Grand Cross of the Order of the Republic (1983)
- Tunisia: Grand Cross of the Order of Independence (1983)
- Germany: Grand Cross, Special Class of the Order of Merit (1983)
- Iceland: Collar with Grand Cross Breast Star of the Order of the Falcon (12 April 1983)
- Nepal: Member of the Order of Ojaswi Rajanya (2 May 1983)
- San Marino: Collar of the Order of San Marino (1983)
- Portugal: Grand Collar of the Order of Infante Dom Henrique (29 September 1983)
- United Kingdom: Honorary Knight Grand Cross of the Order of the Bath (1984)
- Norway: Grand Cross of the Order of St. Olav (1984)
- Monaco: Knight Grand Cross of the Order of Saint-Charles (1984)
- Sweden: Knight of the Royal Order of Seraphim (11 May 1984)
- Jordan: Collar of the Order of Al-Hussein bin Ali
- Rwanda: Grand Cross of the Order of a Thousand Hills (1984)
- Syria: Member 1st Class of the Order of the Unity of the Nation (1984)
- Morocco: Grand Collar of the Order of the Southern Cross (1985)
- Zaire: Grand Cross of the National Order of the Leopard (1985)
- Togo: National Order of Merit (1985)
- Indonesia: Star of the Republic of Indonesia (1986)
- Argentina: Grand Cross of the Order of the Liberator San Martín (6 October 1987)
- Peru: Grand Cross with Diamonds of the Order of the Sun (10 October 1987)
- Portugal: Grand Collar of the Order of Liberty (28 October 1987)
- Djibouti: Dignitary of the Order of the Great Star of Djibouti (1987)
- Oman: Member First Class of the Order of the Sultanate of Oman (1989)
- Philippines: Collar of the Order of Sikatuna (11 July 1989)
- Greece: Grand Cross of the Order of the Savior (1989)
- Hungary: Grand Cross with Chain of the Hungarian Order of Merit
- Pakistan: Nishan Order (21 February 1990)
- Czechoslovakia: Collar of the Order of the White Lion (1990)
- Venezuela: Grand Cross of the Order of the Liberator (1990)
- Madagascar: Grand Cross of the National Order (1990)
- Netherlands: Knight Grand Cross of the Order of the Netherlands Lion (1991)
- Luxembourg: Knight of the Order of the Golden Lion of the House of Nassau (1992)
- Latvia: Commander Grand Cross with Chain of the Order of the Three Stars (15 May 1992)
- United Kingdom: Recipient of the Royal Victorian Chain (1992)
- Poland: Grand Cross of the Order of Merit of the Republic (1993)
- Poland: Commander of the Military Order of Virtuti Militari (1993)
- South Korea: Recipient of the Grand Order of Mugunghwa (1993)
- Yemen: Collar of the Order of the Republic (18 October 1993)
- South Africa: Grand Cross of the Order of Good Hope (1994)
- Sovereign Military Order of Malta: Sovereign Order of St. John Malta
- Czech Republic: Posthumous Grand Cross of the Order of the White Lion (1999)

== Vexillology and heraldry ==
Presidential standard of François Mitterrand

- President Mitterrand had chosen a tree, half oak half olive-tree, as a symbol for his presidential flag.
- President Mitterrand received from King Carl XVI Gustav of Sweden a coat of arms linked to the reception of the Order of the Seraphim, which reproduces this symbol.

== Bibliography ==
- Péan, Pierre (1994). Une jeunesse française: François Mitterrand, 1934–1947 [A French Youth: François Mitterrand, 1934–1947]. Paris: Fayard. ISBN 978-221-364-460-8.

National Assembly of France
Preceded by Roger Gillot	Member of the National Assembly from Nièvre's 3rd district 1946–1958	Succeeded by Jehan Faulquier
Preceded by Jehan Faulquier	Member of the National Assembly from Nièvre's 3rd district 1962–1981	Succeeded by Bernard Bardin
Political offices
Preceded by Max Lejeune	Minister of Veterans and War Victims; 1947	Succeeded by Daniel Mayer
Preceded by Daniel Mayer	Minister of Veterans and War Victims; 1947–1948	Succeeded by André Maroselli
Preceded by Paul Coste-Floret	Minister of Overseas France; 1950–1951	Succeeded by Louis Jacquinot
Preceded by Léon Martinaud-Deplat	Minister of the Interior; 1954–1955	Succeeded by Maurice Bourgès-Maunoury
Preceded by Robert Schuman	Minister of Justice; 1956–1957	Succeeded by Edouard Corniglion-Molinier
Preceded by Valéry Giscard d'Estaing	President of France; 1981–1995	Succeeded by Jacques Chirac
Senate of France
Preceded by Jean Doussot	Member of the Senate from Nièvre; 1959–1962	Succeeded by Daniel Benoîst
Party political offices
Preceded by Alain Savary	First Secretary of the Socialist Party; 1971–1981	Succeeded by Lionel Jospin
Regnal titles
Preceded by Valéry Giscard d'Estaing	Co-Prince of Andorra; 1981–1995; Served alongside: Joan Martí Alanis	Succeeded by Jacques Chirac
Catholic Church titles
Preceded by Valéry Giscard d'Estaing	Honorary Canon of the Archbasilica of St. John Lateran; 1981–1995	Succeeded by Jacques Chirac
Diplomatic posts
Preceded by Pierre Trudeau	Chairperson of the Group of 7; 1982	Succeeded by Ronald Reagan
Preceded by Brian Mulroney	Chairperson of the Group of 7; 1989	Succeeded by George H. W. Bush
Academic offices
Preceded by Ruud Lubbers	Invocation Speaker of the College of Europe; 1987	Succeeded by Margaret Thatcher
