= Bernard Bardin =

French politician (1934–2023)

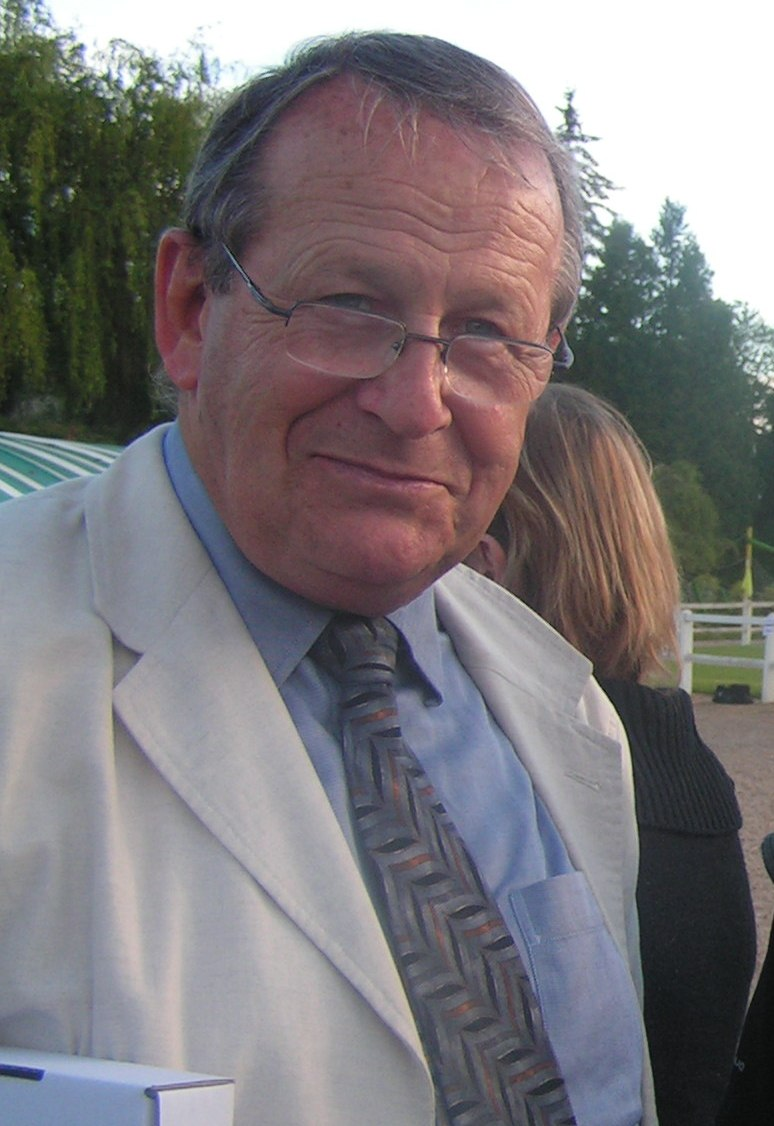
- Bernard Bardin in 2006

Mayor of Clamecy
- In office 1977–2008
- Preceded by: Pierre Barbier
- Succeeded by: Claudine Boisorieux

President of the General Council of Nièvre
- In office 1986–2001
- Preceded by: Noël Berrier
- Succeeded by: Marcel Charmant

Deputy of the French National Assembly
- In office 14 June 1981 – 1 April 1993
- Preceded by: François Mitterrand
- Succeeded by: Simone Rignault
- Constituency: Nièvre's 3rd constituency (1981–1986, 1988–1993); Proportional representation (1986–1988)

Personal details
- Born: 2 August 1934 Cervon, France
- Died: 3 February 2023 (aged 88)
- Party: PS
- Occupation: Teacher

Bernard Bardin (2 August 1934 – 3 February 2023) was a French teacher and politician.

== Biography ==
Born in Cervon on 2 August 1934, Bardin was a teacher at the Collège de Clamecy before becoming a parliamentary assistant to François Mitterrand. In 1986, President Mitterrand appointed him president of the General Council of Nièvre, a role he served until 2001.

Elected Mayor of Clamecy in 1977, he served in this role until 2008. During this term, he provided the commune with a multipurpose town hall, as well as cultural and sports facilities. The commune's museum was renovated and enlarged from 1996 to 2005.

From 1981 to 1993, Bardin was a deputy of the National Assembly, serving in Nièvre's 3rd constituency.

Bernard Bardin died on 3 February 2023, at the age of 88.
