= Jean-Michel Beau =

French gendarme (1943–2020)

- Born: 8 September 1943; Troyes, France
- Died: 23 April 2020 (aged 76); Lunel, France
- Occupation: Gendarme

Jean-Michel Beau (8 September 1943 – 23 April 2020) was a French gendarme. He served during the Irish of Vincennes affair in 1982.

== Biography ==
Beau grew up in a military environment, with his father being a divisional general in the French Army. Beau joined the army in 1961, and became a reserve second lieutenant in July 1964. He passed the entrance exam into the École des officiers de la gendarmerie nationale and graduated in 1971. He also graduated in law.

He exercised several commands across France, and began directing the GIGN in Île-de-France. He was the director during the Irish of Vincennes Affair in 1982. He retired in 1988.

Jean-Michel Beau died on 23 April 2020 in Lunel at the age of 76 due to cancer.

=== Irish of Vincennes Affair ===
The GIGN called out to Irish people in Vincennes suspected of being part of the Irish Republican Army or the Irish National Liberation Army. Because the police had no territorial authority, Beau was tasked with sending the judicial procedure to the office of the ministère public. The gendarmes attempted to establish the belief that there were numerous weapons in the homes of the Irish. Beau was indicted for subordination of witnesses in 1983. After a nine year investigation, Christian Prouteau was indicted on requisition by the public prosecutor's office. In his book, L'Honneur d'un gendarme, Beau alleges that he received death threats from Minister of the Armed Forces Charles Hernu.

Beau retired in 1988 at the age of 44, and received a 15-month suspended sentence. After an appeal, the sentence was reduced to 12 months and a fine of 6000 francs.

=== Elysée Eavesdropping Case ===
In 1993, Beau appeared to be one of the victims of a phone-tapping affair at the Élysée Palace and brought the case to civil action. The investigation lasted nearly ten years. However, after a four-month trial, Beau and his adversaries lost the case. After an appeal, all plaintiffs in the case were reimbursed for all damages suffered at the hands of the State since 1992.

== Distinctions ==
- Knight of the Legion of Honour (2009)

== Books ==
- Les Saisies incidentes (1984)
- L'Honneur d'un gendarme (1989)
- Les Irlandais de Vincennes : L'Honneur d'un gendarme (1990)
- L'Affaire des Irlandais de Vincennes, 1982-2007 ou L'Honneur d'un gendarme (2008)
