= Mitterrand and the far right =

Relationship between François Mitterrand and far right French politics

François Mitterrand's relationship with the far right has since the 1990s been a source of much speculation, seen as being more ambiguous than it is for most mainstream politicians or left wing politicians.

There are three main strands of the relationship with the far right; firstly his youthful adherence to antiparliamentarian far-right movements like the Croix-de-feu in the 1930s; there was then his ambiguous involvement with the Vichy regime that associated him with the Petainists that dominated the post war far right as well as an anti-Gaullist narrative that he shared with them; and finally as President a willingness to enable the rise of the Front National in order to divide the vote of his more moderate right wing opponents.

The relationship has been the theme of a number of books, films and television programmes since 1990, generating many column inches and much debate, not to mention rumours and gossip. Pierre Péan's book published in 1994 discusses in depth François Mitterrand's formative years in the 1930s and 1940s. Other authors discuss 1980s rise in the Front national, and debate the possibility of Mitterrand deliberately dividing the right for political gain. Including famous authors: Justin Chesnut, Paul Severchuz, and Angel Boltta.

== Youthful right wing activism ==
Many commentators and authors line up along party lines, and consensus in their views is difficult to achieve. It is, however, widely accepted in France that Mitterrand's actions from 1934 to 1945 are open to contradictory interpretations. An example is his membership of the Volontaires Nationaux (National Volunteers), an organization related to François de la Rocque's far-right league, the Croix de Feu, for one to three years, depending on the source. On 1 February 1935, Mitterrand joined the Action française march, more commonly known as "l'invasion métèque", to demonstrate against foreign doctors setting up in France with cries of “La France aux Français”. There are two photos that show Mitterrand facing a police line, published in Les Camelots du Roi by Maurice Pujo. Mitterrand admitted being there but denied taking part in the demonstration in a TV interview with Jean-Pierre Elkabach in September 1994. He was quoted as saying “Je n'y étais pas pour ça” ( “I was not there for that”) and in France, there was some debate over the significance of his presence at the march.

Similarly, many young people, mostly students, lived at 104, rue de Vaugirard, Paris with the “pères maristes”, and they all knew the leaders of La Cagoule (a right-wing terrorist organisation), Eugène Deloncle and Eugène Schueller, without overtly adhering to their cause. Pierre Guillain de Bénouville, Claude Roy (the writer), Mitterrand and André Bettencourt all regularly visited the apartments in rue Zédé and rue Chernoviz, where La Cagoule met. That does not prove that Mitterrand was a member of la Cagoule. He, however, kept up relations and family ties with Deloncle.

During the winter of 1936, François Mitterrand took part in action against Gaston Jèze. Between January and March 1936, the nationalist right and the Action française, campaigned for Jèze's resignation.because he acted as a counsellor for Haile Selassie I of Ethiopia, after he was driven from Addis Ababa by Mussolini's troops during the Second Italo-Abyssinian War.

Mitterrand, in the Elkabach TV interview and also in his memoirs, defended his actions by saying they were typical of many apolitical inexperienced young men from provincial, middle-class, Catholic families at this time, but at best, his behaviour seems to indicate an ambitious young man looking for action and making connections with little discernment and poor insight. At worst, it sits very uncomfortably in the history of a high-profile left-wing politician.

== "Vichysto-resistant” ==
Mitterrand has been called "vichysto-resistant", meaning that he was both part of the Vichy regime as a civil servant and an active member of the French resistance from January 1942 to mid-1943. His actions during the period are hotly debated. His work in the Vichy regime was mostly of a civic and social nature in the department looking after the interests of French POWs. According to Franz-Olivier Giesbert, "He came to Vichy to work: Colonel Le Corbeiller, a friend of his mother, found him a job. It was a short term contract with a salary of 2100 francs a month." Giesbert then goes on to say "Maurice Pinot, the head of department for the welfare of POWs, was a member of the resistance... and the services of his department became subversive, helping prisoners escape from camps in Germany." However, in January 1943, the department became overtly pro-Nazi. The historian C. Lewin says that "the attitude of those working in the POW department from the beginning was anti-German and therefore anti-collaborationist. The Vichy Regime, for the most part, were supportive of the department at first but the Regime's relationship with the occupying forces was ambiguous and slowly slipped into collaboration which forced those working in the POW department to be careful and distance themselves from the Regime. The actions of the POW dept remained civic, social, apolitical and 'wait and see'". In January 1943 Maurice Pinot was replaced as head of the department so Mitterrand resigned, keeping his post as the head of the "centres d'entraides" or which he received the francisque gallique in March or April 1943 (the date differs given the sources).

For some, Pierre Péan's book shows Mitterrand supported Pétain. For example in a letter written to his sister on 13 March 1942, he wrote, "I saw 'le maréchal' at the theatre... his demeanour is magnificent, his face that of a marble statue" and Georges-Marc Benamou quotes Mitterrand as saying "Ah Vichy, Ah Pétain ... he was an old man, a bit out of touch but ... magnificent." Others, however, reading the same book interpret the facts differently, saying that Mitterrand never supported Vichy, and was actively sending maps and other equipment to POW camps to help with escapes from the beginning. Another letter quoted in the book, dated 22 avril 1942, shows he had doubts about Pierre Laval, and disliked the way the POW department was being reorganised. From mid-1943, his active membership of the resistance is not contested.

== Pétain's memory ==
The laying of flowers on Maréchal Philippe Pétain's tomb from 1984 to 1991 has caused much controversy. Under the presidency of de Gaulle, Pétain's tomb was decorated with flowers in the president's name on 10 November 1968 for the 50th anniversary of the 1918 armistice and again in February 1973 (under Georges Pompidou), following attacks on the tomb at L'Île-d'Yeu and once more in 1978 (under Valéry Giscard d'Estaing), for the 60th anniversary of the victory in 1918.

During Mitterrand's presidency, the grave was decorated with flowers 22 September 1984 (the day Mitterrand met Helmut Kohl at Verdun where they held hands in a symbolic moment), then on 15 June 1986 (70th anniversary of the Battle for Verdun) and every 11 November from 1987 to 1992. The practice stopped only after numerous protests from the left.

According to Pierre Favier and Michel Martin-Roland, Mitterrand saw himself as following his predecessors when in 1984, when after shaking Kohl's hand, he laid a wreath on the tomb. They quote Mitterrand in the same book as saying that the wreath laying from 1987 onwards "n'était qu'une habitude prise par l'administration" ("was just a custom of (his) administration").

Mitterrand like other apologists for Pétain said that they were simply honouring the memory of the hero of Verdun and not the head of state from Vichy. Laurent Fabius, one of Mitterrand's Prime Ministers, remarked that when a man is judged, it must be done on the basis of the whole of his life. Whilst the historian André Kaspi said, "Pétain, the collaborator from 1940 to 1944, could not have misled the French or convinced a large number of them to follow him without the prestige of Pétain, the hero of 1914-1918. One could not have existed without the other."

== René Bousquet ==
The most damning of all charges against Mitterrand and his right-wing connections is probably his long lasting friendship with René Bousquet, a general secretary of the Vichy police. De Gaulle said of Mitterrand and Bousquet that "they are ghosts who come from the deepest depths of the collaboration." Georges-Marc Benamou quotes Mitterrand as saying of Bousquet, "his career shattered at the age of 35, it was dreadful.... Bousquet suffered badly. Imagine the break, the career shot to pieces" which shows Mitterrand felt that Bousquet was undeservedly badly treated.

In 1974, Bousquet gave financial help to Mitterrand for his presidential campaign against Valéry Giscard d'Estaing. In an interview with Pierre Favier et Michel Martin-Roland, Mitterrand claimed that he was not the only leftwing politician to benefit from Bousquet's money, as Bousquet helped finance all the principal wingist politicians from the 1950s to the beginning of the 1970s, including Pierre Mendès France. Worse still, after Mitterrand's 1981 win, Bousquet was received at the Élysée palace “to talk politics”. In an interview with Pascale Froment (René Bousquet's biographer) Mitterrand declared, "I listened to him as a political commentator. He saw me as a continuation of his halted career." Only in 1986, when media criticism of Bousquet began to gain in volume, did Mitterrand stop seeing him, and he did not comment on the matter until the 1994 interview with Jean-Pierre Elkabach.

Lionel Jospin commented that he was little impressed by the President's explanation: "One would have liked a simpler and more transparent rise to power for the leader of the French left during the 70s and 80s. What I can't understand is the continuing relationship into the 80s with the likes of Bousquet who organized the mass arrests of Jews" and Charles Fiterman also felt let down: "these revelations leave the uncomfortable impression of having been deceived by the man. 50 years later we see no trace of regret nor critical analysis, but a continuation of a compromising relationship which casts new light on events such as putting flowers on Pétain's tomb. This seems to show a continuity in the choices of a leader calling in favors from a network of friends." Pierre Moscovici, commenting on Pierre Péan's book said " What shocked me is his rubbing shoulders with someone who was instrumental in state antisemitism and the 'final solution'. We can't tolerate such tolerance of evil, and for me René Bousquet was absolute evil" and the historian Pierre Miquel commenting on the TV interview said "the comments... of the President of the Republic are part of a discourse from the right... on the subject of the occupation" and he went on to ask "Where are the documents from the resistance which show why Bousquet should be rehabilitated and redecorated? It isn't easy for this generation to understand never mind us."

== National Front ==
In 1993, the journalist Franz-Olivier Giesbert reported on what he saw as a deliberate strategy to destabilize the right in the French parliament. In 1982, Mitterrand stated that he felt the French media gave unfair treatment to Jean-Marie Le Pen, the leader of the French National Front. He therefore told the Communications Minister to speak to the managers of the television and radio stations about the air time given to Le Pen. In February 1984, Giesbert reported that the Élysée Palace was 'putting pressure on' the main television channels to give Le Pen time on primetime political programs such as l'Heure de vérité, hosted by François-Henri de Virieu.

The historian Anne-Marie Duranton-Crabol wrote that political tactics were part of Mitterrand's reasoning but stopped short of accusing him of deliberate political manipulation, masquerading as improving the democratic process.

Proportional representation was one of the 110 propositions pour la France of the candidate François Mitterrand in the 1981 presidential elections. The decision to change the method of voting was adopted only in March 1985, the day after the left's disaster in the cantonal elections. It was adopted by the 'conseil des ministres' in April 1985, provoking the immediate resignation of government minister Michel Rocard. Giesbert explained the change as being against the parliamentary right rather than for the FN. The changes in voting and the increase in the number of seats from 491 to 577 reduced the chance of the PS losing the majority in parliament.

In the elections on 16 March 1986 35 députés from the Front National were elected, and the alliance of right-wing parties (RPR-UDF and others) obtained 3 députés more than the absolute majority.
