= Cervon =

- Commune
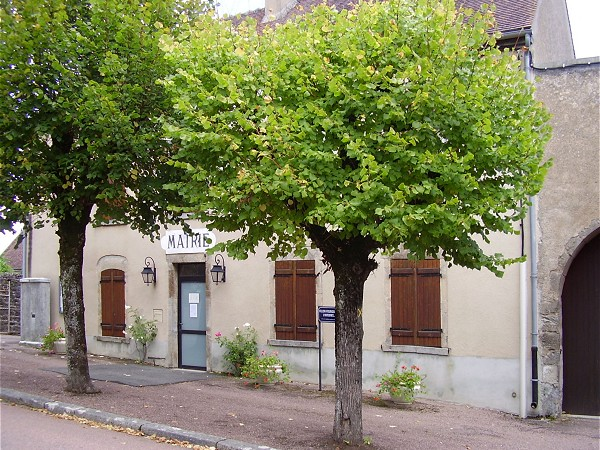
- The town hall in Cervon
- Location of Cervon
- Location within France Location within Bourgogne-Franche-Comté
- Coordinates: 47°14′29″N 3°45′23″E
- Country: France
- Region: Bourgogne-Franche-Comté
- Department: Nièvre
- Arrondissement: Clamecy
- Canton: Corbigny
- Intercommunality: Tannay-Brinon-Corbigny

Government
  - Mayor (2020–2026): Fabien Sansoit
- Area^{1}: 54.06 km^{2} (20.87 sq mi)
- Highest elevation: 408 m (1,339 ft)
- Lowest elevation: 192 m (630 ft)
- Population (2023): 588
  - Density: 10.9/km^{2} (28.2/sq mi)
- Time zone: UTC+01:00 (CET)
  - Summer (DST): UTC+02:00 (CEST)
- INSEE/Postal code: 58047 /58800
- ^{1} French Land Register data, which excludes lakes, ponds, glaciers > 1 km^{2} (0.386 sq mi or 247 acres) and river estuaries.

Cervon (French pronunciation: [sɛʁvɔ̃]) is a commune in the Nièvre department in central France.

== See also ==
- Communes of the Nièvre department
- Morvan Regional Natural Park
