= Irish of Vincennes =

French police scandal

The "Irish of Vincennes" affair (French: Affaire des Irlandais de Vincennes; also known as the Vincennes Three, or Irishmen of Vincennes, although one of the arrestees was not a man) was a major political scandal which occurred in France during the presidency of François Mitterrand. Following a 1982 terrorist attack in Paris, a secret police anti-terrorist cell established by Mitterrand arrested three Irish nationals in Vincennes. Proudly proclaimed as a victory against 'international terrorism', the case fell apart and the suspects were cleared of all charges before the case came to trial when it was revealed that weapons and other evidence used against the three had been planted by the arresting officers, who then lied to the investigating judge, with the press alleging that documents supporting the suspects' innocence had been covered up by the government.

== Background ==
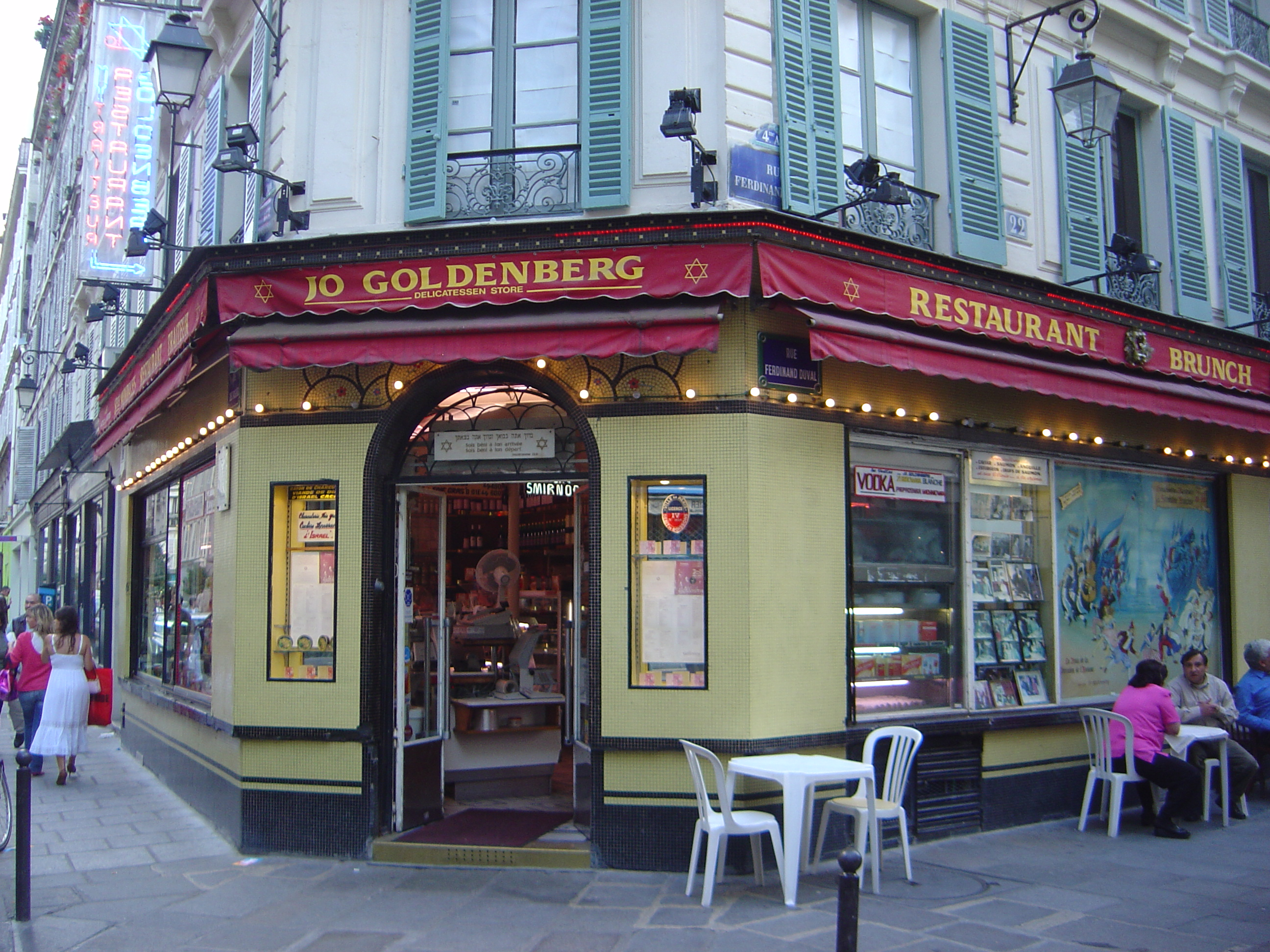
Jo Goldenberg restaurant in 2005. The restaurant was attacked by terrorists in August 1982.

On 9 August 1982, the Jo Goldenberg restaurant on the Rue des Rosiers in the Jewish quarter of Paris was attacked by two terrorists. Two men approached the restaurant, threw a grenade into the main room, and opened fire at passers-by with an automatic weapon, killing six people and wounding 22.

Shortly after the Goldenberg incident, Mitterrand assigned Christian Prouteau, head of the elite National Gendarmerie Intervention Group (Groupe d'Intervention de la Gendarmerie Nationale – GIGN), to organise the establishment of a 'Mission of coordination, information and action against terrorism' (later simply called the 'anti-terrorist cell'), to operate in secret and to report directly to the office of the President (police and security services would normally fall under the responsibilities of the Minister of the Interior).

== Arrest and charge of the suspects ==
On 28 August, the cell requested the arrest of three activists linked to the Irish nationalist movement via their association with the Irish Republican Socialist Party (IRSP) and its paramilitary wing, the Irish National Liberation Army (INLA). The three people—Stephen King, Michael Plunkett and Mary Reid (Plunkett's girlfriend)—were arrested in an apartment (inhabited by Plunkett, Reid and their child) on the Rue Diderot in Vincennes, in which three handguns and a small amount of explosive were found. The three suspects were charged on 30 August, and consistently claimed throughout the investigation that they did not possess the arms and explosives seized, and that they had not been present during the search, leading them to suspect that the weapons had been planted by the gendarmes.

The three Irish were charged in Créteil and later transferred to the Palais de Justice in Paris. The prosecution attempted to link them with planning an attack in Paris. However, nine months later, in May 1983, they were released on bail when evidence emerged that the police might have planted two of the guns and the explosives found in the apartment and that neither King nor Plunkett were present during the police search.

== Criminal proceedings against the police ==
An investigation into the circumstances of the arrest was initiated, with several gendarmes questioned by the investigating judge, as well as an internal inquiry conducted at the highest level by a gendarmerie general. The inquiry revealed that documents certifying that the search had been carried out following proper procedure (that both the suspects and a duly-empowered senior police officer had been present) had been fabricated. The falsification of the search documents was a violation of Section 57 of the Code of Criminal Procedure, and on 5 October 1983, a Paris court annulled the charges against King, Plunkett and Reid.

On 24 June 1991, Christian Prouteau, José Windels and Jean-Michel Beau were put on trial for the fabrication of a criminal case. On 24 September, Prouteau and Beau were convicted of perverting the course of justice, and conspiracy to do so, and were given a suspended sentence of 15 months imprisonment. In an appeal judgement on 15 January 1992, Beau's sentence was reduced to twelve months, suspended, and Prouteau was acquitted.

== Le Monde libel case ==
On 31 October 1985, the French newspaper Le Monde published an article by Edwy Plenel alleging that Captain Paul Barril had "supplied the incriminating evidence" in the Vincennes case. The article was based on the testimony of Jean-François Jegat during questioning by the French intelligence service (Direction de la Surveillance du Territoire – DST) on other matters. Jegat alleged that he had supplied the explosive material and handguns found in the Vincennes flat to Barril.

On 21 March 1991, Le Monde published a lengthy follow-up article entitled Irlandais de Vincennes: les cachoteries de l'Elysée (The Irishmen in Vincennes: an Elysée cover-up ), which further alleged that secret documents known to the executive had been withheld from the courts. The article referred to Beau and Jegat's evidence (which they were not due to give for several months), an internal memorandum from the Presidential office regarding Jegat, and Jegat's record of interview with the DST. On 26 April 1991, Barril brought libel proceedings against Le Monde, its editor-in-chief, and the journalist Plenel, in the French Criminal Court for libel of a public official. In May, Le Monde applied to prove its allegation to the court by providing documents and naming witnesses. In November, the paper withdrew part of its application, notably the request to call Prouteau as a witness. In addition, the court ordered a stay of proceedings pending the decision in the criminal cases against Beau and Jegat which had prevented them from giving evidence in the libel case.

On 17 September 1992, the court noted that Plenel's story in Le Monde had been "one of the most serious allegations possible against a public official", and that it had certainly impacted if not destroyed Barril's professional and personal reputation, however, it dismissed his assertion that his lack of a conviction over the matter meant that the allegations were without basis. Reviewing the documents provided by Le Monde, and hearing evidence from Beau and Jegat, the court found that the allegations were proven true and dismissed the criminal and civil case against the newspaper.

In March 2003, the Criminal Division of the Court of Cassation annulled the judicial proceedings against Barril on procedural grounds. The Court of Appeal criticised the lower court's judgement, in which it was stated that it was an "undeniable fact" that no charge had been brought against Barril, thereby prohibiting anyone from implicating him in the case in any way. It also dismissed Barril's appeal, on the grounds that as no charges were brought against him, and the lower court had ruled in the case based solely on the Press Law, there was no basis for his claim that the presumption of innocence had been violated.

== Later events ==
Mary Reid became an academic and had an interest in researching a medieval pilgrimage site near Lough Derg. She was found drowned on a beach on the Isle of Doagh near Ballyliffin on 29 January 2003, after leaving her home in Derry to walk her two dogs (one of which was also drowned). Several speculative theories arose surrounding her death, including that she had discovered the truth about the Holy Grail in her research, as well as several involving her past with the IRSP and INLA.
