= Christian Prouteau =

French officer of the National Gendarmerie

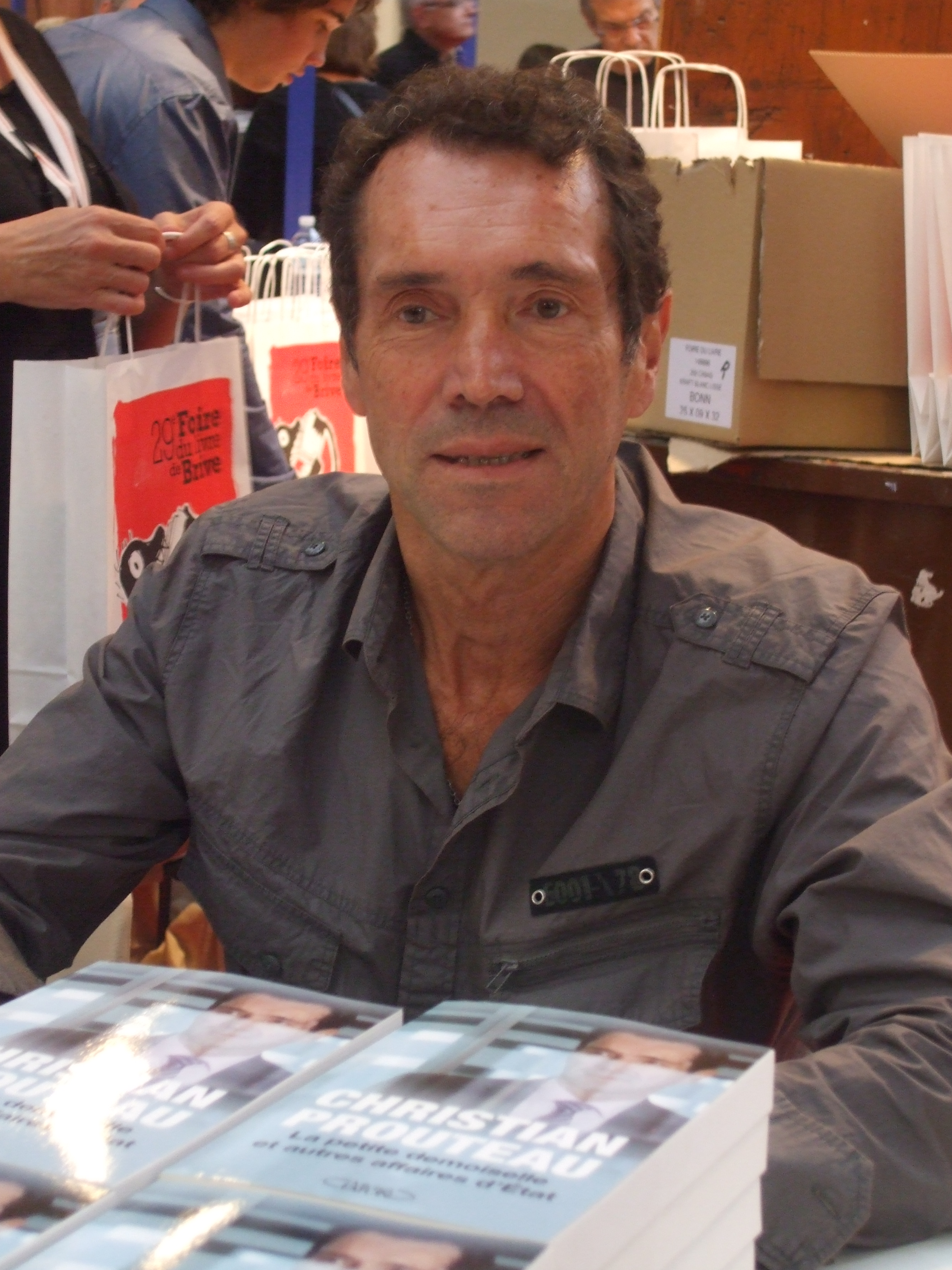
Christian Prouteau

Christian Prouteau (born 7 April 1944) is a retired French military officer in the French National Gendarmerie. He was involved in the organisation of the GIGN (of which he was prominent commander in) and the GSPR.

== Biography ==
Prouteau graduated from Saint-Cyr, the French army's officers' school, in 1969. After a stint in the army, he transferred to the National Gendarmerie and graduated from École des officiers de la gendarmerie nationale, the Gendarmerie's Officers school. Posted to a Mobile Gendarmerie squadron (ie troop) he became an instructor in commando techniques. In 1973, in response to the Munich massacre, French authorities decided to create an elite unit capable of countering acts of terrorism. Prouteau was selected to organise GIGN.

Prouteau lead GIGN for 9 years, leading 64 interventions. He was severely wounded in 1980.

From 1982 to 1988, Prouteau directed the 'Anti-terrorist Cell' of the Élysée which was involved in the Élysée wiretap scandal and the "Irish of Vincennes" affair. In 1991 he received a fifteen-month suspended sentence for his role in the "Irish of Vincennes" case, and while he was cleared of these charges in 1992, he received a suspended eight-month sentence and was fined €5000 in 2005 for his involvement in the wiretap scandal.

Prouteau organised the security of the 1992 Winter Olympics.

He was appointed a préfet hors cadre (a prefect not attached to any particular prefecture) in March 1985.

Since retirement in 2009, he has been active as a television consultant and in various organizations (including the association of the former GIGN members).
