= Law enforcement in Saint Pierre and Miquelon =

Law enforcement in Saint Pierre and Miquelon is the responsibility of a branch of the French Gendarmerie Nationale. There are two gendarmerie stations in the archipegalo.

== History ==
Ranks of the Gendarmerie

The following equivalent ranks have been substituted for ease of understanding:

- Staff sergeant for Maréchal-des-logis
- Corporal for Brigadier
- Warrant Officer for Adjudant

Gendarme Yreux was the first gendarme to set foot on the colony, arriving in Saint-Pierre on 25 May 1816. On 30 August 1819, Saint-Pierre welcomed Corporal Auguste Tavernier and gendarmes Morlec Alexandre, Pierre Richard and Louis Codec. The size of the contingent was raised to five. Constable Yreux left the colony on 2 September 1824.

On 10 June 1824, Corporal Novel was appointed Auditor of Weights and Measures as a result of the "Law on the decimal system". On 27 September 1826, Corporal Pierre Noël was authorized to exercise the functions of bailiff.

In 1831, the Gendarmerie was split between Saint-Pierre and Miquelon. In 1835 the contingent consisted of ten men, one staff sergeant, one sergeant and eight gendarmes.

On 11 April 1843, a ministerial order stipulated that the Gendarmerie of Saint-Pierre include one sergeant, one corporal and twelve gendarmes. The number had increased by two men since 1835.

The first police station was built on 11 June 1851, when the first stone was laid. The building still exists and houses the offices of the Gendarmerie, facing Joffre Square on the coast.

On 11 December 1861, the contingent consisted of one sergeant, one corporal and fourteen gendarmes.

In 1875, Corporal Bonnefond Marcellin took the rank of sergeant and became commander of the Gendarmerie. On 10 March 1877, the Gendarmerie was increased to twenty by decree, and comprised one sergeant, two corporals and seventeen gendarmes.

In 1892, the Gendarmerie was organised as follows:

- Saint-Pierre Brigade: one staff sergeant, one sergeant, one corporal and twelve gendarmes
- Miquelon Brigade: one sergeant and one gendarme
- Langlade Brigade: two gendarmes
- Île-aux-Chiens, now known as the Île-aux-Marins: two gendarmes

In 1888, two gendarmes, Bonnaud and Dangla, were implicated in the murder of Father Coupard on the Île-aux-Chiens. Staff sergeant Pittolat was replaced by staff sergeant Richard Anselmo. Arrived in 1892, he was the last staff sergeant detachment commander, as the decree of 17 March 1894 fixed the size of the Gendarmerie as follows:

- Saint-Pierre: one lieutenant, one sergeant, two corporals and twelve gendarmes
- Miquelon: one corporal and one gendarme
- Langlade: two gendarmes
- Île-aux-Chiens: two gendarmes

The use of the rank of staff sergeant was ended to entrust the command to a police lieutenant, Ferdinand Pellegry, who arrived in August 1894. He was the first commanding officer of the Gendarmerie of Saint-Pierre and Miquelon.

Sergeant Emile Dangla arrived in the colony on 26 May 1884. He was acting detachment commander between the departure of Lieutenant Pellegry on 8 October 1896, and the arrival of Lieutenant Edouard Nougue, in late December 1896. Nougue left in August 1899 following the implementation of the Decree of 17 June 1899, which abolished the post of lieutenant and restored that of staff sergeant. The same decree reduced the detachment to fourteen gendarmes:

- Saint-Pierre: seven gendarmes
- Miquelon: one gendarme
- Langlade: two gendarmes
- Île-aux-Chiens: one gendarme

Dangla was promoted to chief and took command until 14 November 1904, and was succeeded by staff sergeant Joeseph Rochet who arrived on 1 November 1911. As a result of the abolition in 1906 of the post of staff sergeant, Rochet was demoted to the rank of sergeant, extremely rare in the history of the Gendarmerie. The size is again reduced by decree on 28 September 1906, when the gendarme was removed from Langlade. Saint-Pierre then had one sergeant, one corporal and eight gendarmes. Miquelon and the Île-aux-Chiens retained their gendarmes.

On 25 September 1910, Rochet passed command to corporal Adolphe Mauffroy who was promoted to sergeant reducing the size of the capital of three gendarmes. This left: Saint-Pierre: one sergeant, one corporal and five gendarmes Miquelon: one gendarme Langlade: one gendarme Île-aux-Chiens: one gendarme

This variation in the strength of the Gendarmerie was caused by the collapse of the economy of St. Pierre at the turn of the century. The official newspaper of the colony announced that on 4 July 1925, the Gendarmerie consisted of a staff of eleven:

- Saint-Pierre: one warrant officer and eight gendarmes
- Miquelon: one gendarme
- Île-aux-Chiens: one gendarme

On 28 August 1926 the number was further reduced and consisted of one warrant officer and seven gendarmes on Saint-Pierre, with the Miquelon and Île-aux-Chiens positions closing.

By decree of 8 September 1934, the contingent consisted as follows:

- Saint-Pierre: one chief warrant officer or warrant officer, one staff sergeant, and five gendarmes
- Miquelon: one gendarme

After being restored, the position of Miquelon was removed on 12 June 1936 by decision of the head of the territory. It was restored again on 19 February 1942 by a new decision of the head of the territory. On 23 September 1943, the position on Langlade, abolished in 1916, was restored by local decree. The size was set at one gendarme. A police station was built in Government Bay, but has now been destroyed and no longer exists today.

By decree of 13 March 1946, the size of the detachment was increased to ten:

- Saint-Pierre: one chief warrant officer or warrant officer, one staff sergeant and six gendarmes
- Miquelon: one gendarme and
- Langlade: one gendarme

The position at Langlade was later abolished by local decree.

The constant change of staff of the gendarmerie was subject to the whims of governors and administrators who followed one another, ignoring the difficult life of the gendarmes. Supplies were delivered to the detachments on Miquelon, Langlade and the Île-aux-Chiens "if time allowed".

On 1 September 1957 the contingent took the name of "the Section of Gendarmerie of Saint-Pierre and Miquelon" (French: section de gendarmerie de Saint-Pierre et Miquelon). On 8 October the same year, the strength of the section was increased to thirteen - one chief warrant officer, two staff sergeants and ten gendarmes.

On 1 April 1965, the section was renamed "the Company of Gendarmerie of Saint-Pierre and Miquelon" (French: la compagnie de gendarmerie de Saint-Pierre et Miquelon). On 25 April, 70 mobile gendarmes arrived in Saint-Pierre with the Anti-Aircraft and Anti-Submarine Escort vessel "Dupetit-Thouars", creating strong feelings among the population. The (single) gendarmes married many of the young women of Saint-Pierre. It is said that 26 couples were married, though several divorces were also pronounced. Sometimes tragedies divided families, with some women making every effort to marry one of the mobile gendarme and then leave the islands. Equally, some gendarmes resigned after their marriage and settled in Saint-Pierre.

1 December 1968 saw an increase in police staffing:

- Group of the Company Commandant: one lieutenant, one deputy chief warrant officer, one staff sergeant and one gendarme
- Territorial Brigade of Saint-Pierre: one warrant officer or staff sergeant and ten gendarmes
- Territorial Brigade of Miquelon: one gendarme, though this position was extended to two gendarmes on 18 November 1970

On 29 September 1972, the Port & Airport Brigade was created to act as a border guard. It consisted of one sergeant and one gendarme.

A ministerial decision on 20 June 1975 provided for an increase in size of the company. These numbers are broken down as follows:

- Group of the Company Commandant: one lieutenant, one deputy chief warrant officer, two staff sergeants and three gendarmes
- Port & Airport Brigade: one warrant officer and two gendarmes
- Territorial Brigade of Saint-Pierre: one warrant officer or staff sergeant and eighteen gendarmes
- Territorial Brigade of Miquelon: one sergeant and one gendarme

A total of thirty-two men. The position of lieutenant was replaced by a captain. These came into effect in 1980.

At this time, the gendarmes also fulfilled various other functions. The captain was the Police Commissioner and acted as public prosecutor. An investigating officer was also the court bailiff. In 1997, the territorial brigade was downsized to 13 gendarmes, and 8 gendarmes of the Gendarmerie Maritime who deployed with the new patrol boat Fulmar, a former Canadian Coast Guard vessel purchased by France. In 2000, the Miquelon brigade consisted of one warrant officer and two gendarmes. While initially a patrol boat of the Gendarmerie Maritime, the Fulmar was transferred to the French Navy in 2009 for operations in territorial and regional waters. In August 2001, the Company of Gendarmerie of Saint-Pierre and Miquelon was commanded by a lieutenant-colonel to replace a squadron leader.

In 2002, the Gendarmerie comprised the following:

- Group of the Company Commandant: one Lieutenant-colonel, one deputy captain, a secretariat comprising one gendarme and one warrant officer and real estate, equipment, computer and auto shop resources.
- Territorial Brigade of Saint-Pierre: one chief warrant officer, one warrant officer, one staff sergeant, ten departmental gendarmes or judicial police agents/officers including two pilots of police boats, and three mobile gendarmes as reinforcements.
- Territorial Brigade of Miquelon: one warrant officer, two departmental gendarmes, and two mobile gendarmes mobiles as reinforcements.
- The navy patrol boat Fulmar: As of 2023, a total of 11 personnel were listed as assigned to Fulmar.

A website dedicated to the gendarmes of Saint-Pierre and Miquelon was created in 2002.

== Structure ==
- one headquarters, which assists with logistical and administrative services
- two territorial brigades, one for Saint-Pierre and one for Miquelon
- one investigation brigade on Saint-Pierre, whose members are part of the police judiciaire

== See also ==
- Law enforcement in France
- Europol
- Interpol
