= National Gendarmerie =

Militarised police force in France

National Gendarmerie Gendarmerie nationale
- Logo of the National Gendarmerie
- Common name: Gendarmerie
- Motto: Pour la patrie, l'honneur et le droit (For the fatherland, honour and law)

Agency overview
- Formed: 16 February 1791 (235 years, 271 days ago)
- Preceding agency: Maréchaussée
- Employees: 102,162 people (2023)
- Volunteers: 12,602 volunteers (2018)
- Annual budget: €11.12 billion (2026)

Jurisdictional structure
- National agency: France
- Operations jurisdiction: France
- Constituting instrument: Law of 28 Germinal year VI (April 17, 1798) relating to the organization of the national gendarmerie
- General nature: Gendarmerie; Local civilian police
- Specialist jurisdiction: Paramilitary law enforcement, counter insurgency, riot control

Operational structure
- Officers and NCOs: 6,203 officers and 74,015 NCOs performing operational missions (2018); 595 officers and 4,592 NCOs in technical and administrative services (2018)
- Civilian staffs: 4,424 people (2018)
- Ministers responsible: Laurent Nuñez, Minister of the Interior; Catherine Vautrin, Minister of the Armed Forces
- Agency executive: Hubert Bonneau, Directeur-Général
- Parent agency: Ministry of the Interior; Ministry of Armed Forces
- Components: Gendarmerie components: Departmental Gendarmerie; Mobile Gendarmerie; Republican Guard; Air Transport Gendarmerie; Ordnance Gendarmerie; Air Gendarmerie; Maritime Gendarmerie; Nuclear ordnance security Gendarmerie

Website
- www.gendarmerie.interieur.gouv.fr

The National Gendarmerie (French: Gendarmerie nationale [ʒɑ̃daʁməʁi nɑsjɔnal]) is one of two national law enforcement forces of France, along with the National Police.

The Gendarmerie is a branch of the French Armed Forces placed under the jurisdiction of the Ministry of the Interior, with additional duties from the Ministry of Armed Forces. Its responsibilities include policing smaller towns, suburbs and rural areas (around 51% of the French population and 96% of its territory), crowd and riot control, and criminal investigation, including cybercrime. By contrast, the National Police is a civilian law enforcement agency that is in charge of policing cities and larger towns. Because of its military status, the Gendarmerie also fulfills a range of military and defence missions.

The Gendarmerie has a strength of around 102,162 people (as of 2023).

The Gendarmerie is the heir of the Maréchaussée, the oldest police force in France, dating back to the Middle Ages. Historically, the term "gens d'armes" (lit. 'men-at-arms') referred to armed soldiers or units associated with the royal or noble forces in France. The Gendarmerie has influenced the culture and traditions of gendarmerie forces around the world, especially in independent countries from the former French colonial empire.

== History ==
=== Early history of the institution ===
The Gendarmerie is the direct descendant of the Maréchaussée ("Marshalcy") of the ancien regime.

During the Middle Ages, there were two Grand Officers of the Kingdom of France with police responsibilities: The Marshal of France and the Constable of France. The military policing responsibilities of the Marshal of France were delegated to the Marshal's provost, whose force was known as the Marshalcy because its authority ultimately derived from the Marshal. The Marshalcy dates back to the Hundred Years' War, with some historians tracing it back to the early 12th century.

The second organisation, the Constabulary (Connétablie), was under the command of the Constable of France. The constabulary was regularised as a military body in 1337.

In 1415 the Maréchaussée fought in the Battle of Agincourt and their commander, the Prévôt des Maréchaux (Provost of the Marshals), Gallois de Fougières, was killed in battle. This history was rediscovered in 1934, and Gallois de Fougières was then officially recorded as the first known gendarme to have died in the line of duty. His remains are now buried under the monument to the gendarmerie in Versailles.

Under King Francis I (r. 1515–1547), the Maréchaussée was merged with the Constabulary. The resulting force was also known as the Maréchaussée, or, formally, the Constabulary and Marshalcy of France (connétablie et maréchaussée de France). Unlike the former constabulary, the new Maréchaussée was not a fully militarized force.

In 1720, the Maréchaussée was officially attached to the Household of the King (Maison du Roi), together with the gendarmerie of the time, which was not a police force at all, but a royal guard. During the eighteenth century, the marshalcy developed in two distinct areas: increasing numbers of Marshalcy Companies (compagnies de marechaussée), dispersed into small detachments, were stationed around the French countryside to maintain law and order, while specialist units provided security for royal and strategic sites such as palaces and the mint (e.g., the garde de la prévôté de l'hôtel du roi and the prévôté des monnaies de Paris.)

While its existence ensured the relative safety of French rural districts and roads, visitors from England, which had nothing but the not very effective parish constables, saw the Maréchaussée, with its armed and uniformed patrols, as royal soldiers with an oppressive role and so a symbol of foreign tyranny. On the eve of the 1789 French Revolution, the Maréchaussée numbered 3,660 men divided into small brigades (a "brigade" in this context being a squad of ten to twenty men). Their limited numbers and scattered deployment rendered the Maréchaussée ineffective in controlling the "Great Fear" of July through August, 1789.

=== The Revolutionary Period ===
During the revolutionary period, the Maréchaussée commanders generally placed themselves under the local constitutional authorities. Despite their connection with the king, they were therefore perceived as a force favoring the reforms of the French National Assembly.

As a result, the Maréchaussée Royale was not disbanded but simply renamed as the gendarmerie nationale. Its personnel remained unchanged, and the functions of the force remained much as before. However, from this point, the gendarmerie, unlike the Maréchaussée, became a fully militarized force. During the revolutionary period, the main force responsible for policing was the National Guard. Although the Maréchaussée had been the main police force of the ancien regime, the gendarmerie was initially a full-time auxiliary to the National Guard militia.

In 1791 the newly named gendarmerie nationale was grouped into 28 divisions, each commanded by a colonel responsible for three départements. In turn, two companies of gendarmes under the command of captains were based in each department. This territorial basis of organisation continued throughout the 19th and 20th centuries.

=== Nineteenth century ===
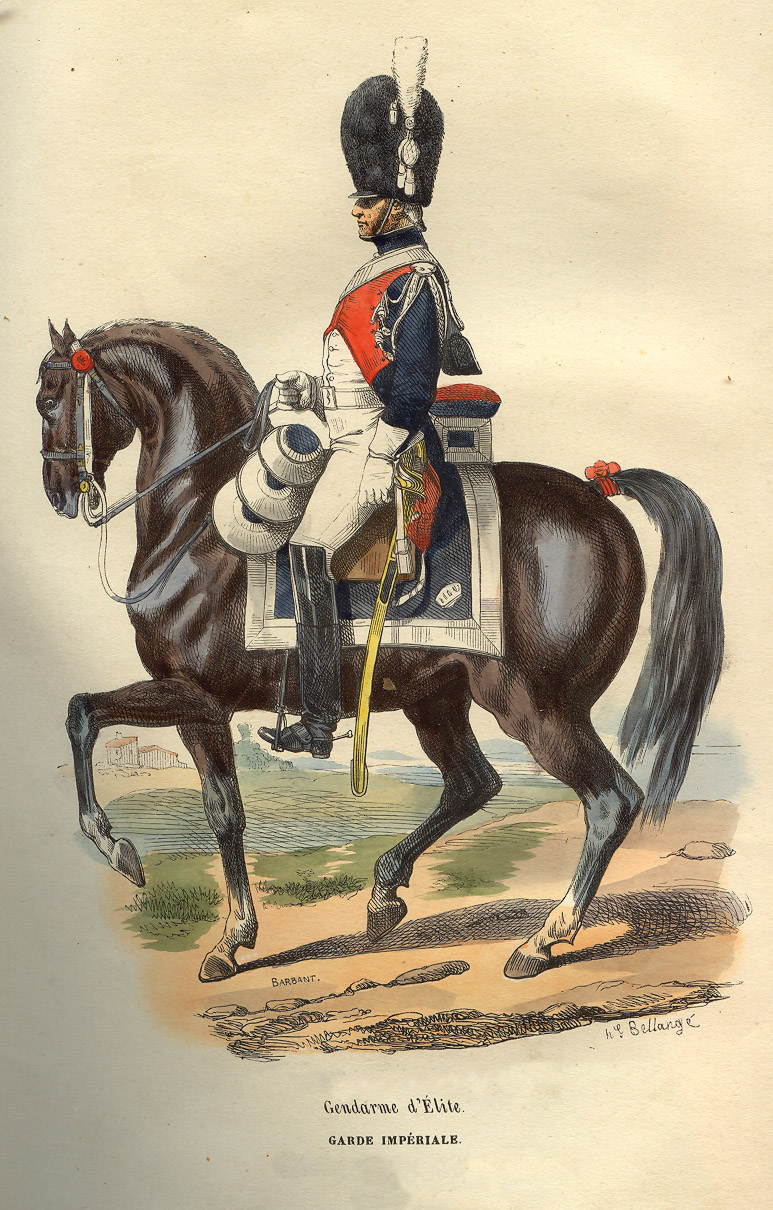
A Gendarme d'élite de la Garde Impériale

Under Napoléon, the numbers and responsibilities of the gendarmerie—renamed gendarmerie impériale—were expanded significantly. In contrast to the mounted Maréchaussée, the gendarmerie were both horse and foot personnel; in 1800, these numbered approximately 10,500 of the former and 4,500 of the later, respectively.

In 1804 the first Inspector General of Gendarmerie was appointed and a general staff established—based out of the rue du Faubourg-Saint-Honoré in Paris. Subsequently, special gendarmerie units were created within the Imperial Guard for combat duties in French occupied Spain.

Following the Second Restoration of 1815, the gendarmerie was reduced in numbers to about 18,000 and reorganised into departmental legions. Under King Louis Phillippe a "gendarmerie of Africa" was created for service in Algeria and during the Second Empire the Imperial Guard Gendarmerie Regiment was re-established. The majority of gendarmes continued in what was now the established role of the corps—serving in small, sedentary detachments as armed rural police. Under the Third Republic the ratio of foot to mounted gendarmes increased and the numbers directly incorporated in the French Army with a military police role reduced.

In 1901, the École des officiers de la gendarmerie nationale was established to train its officers.

=== Battle honours ===
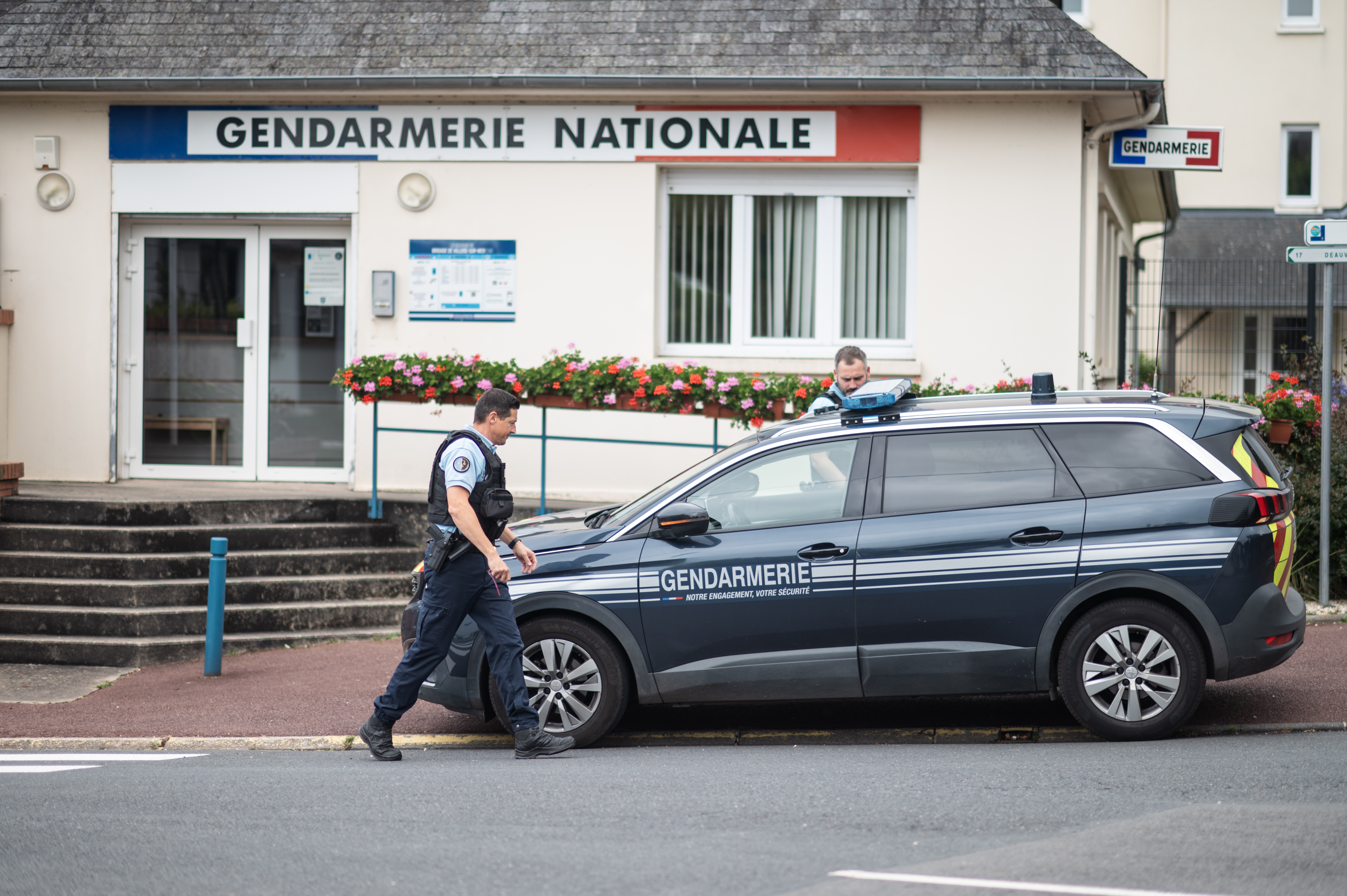
Gendarmes in front of a Gendarmerie station

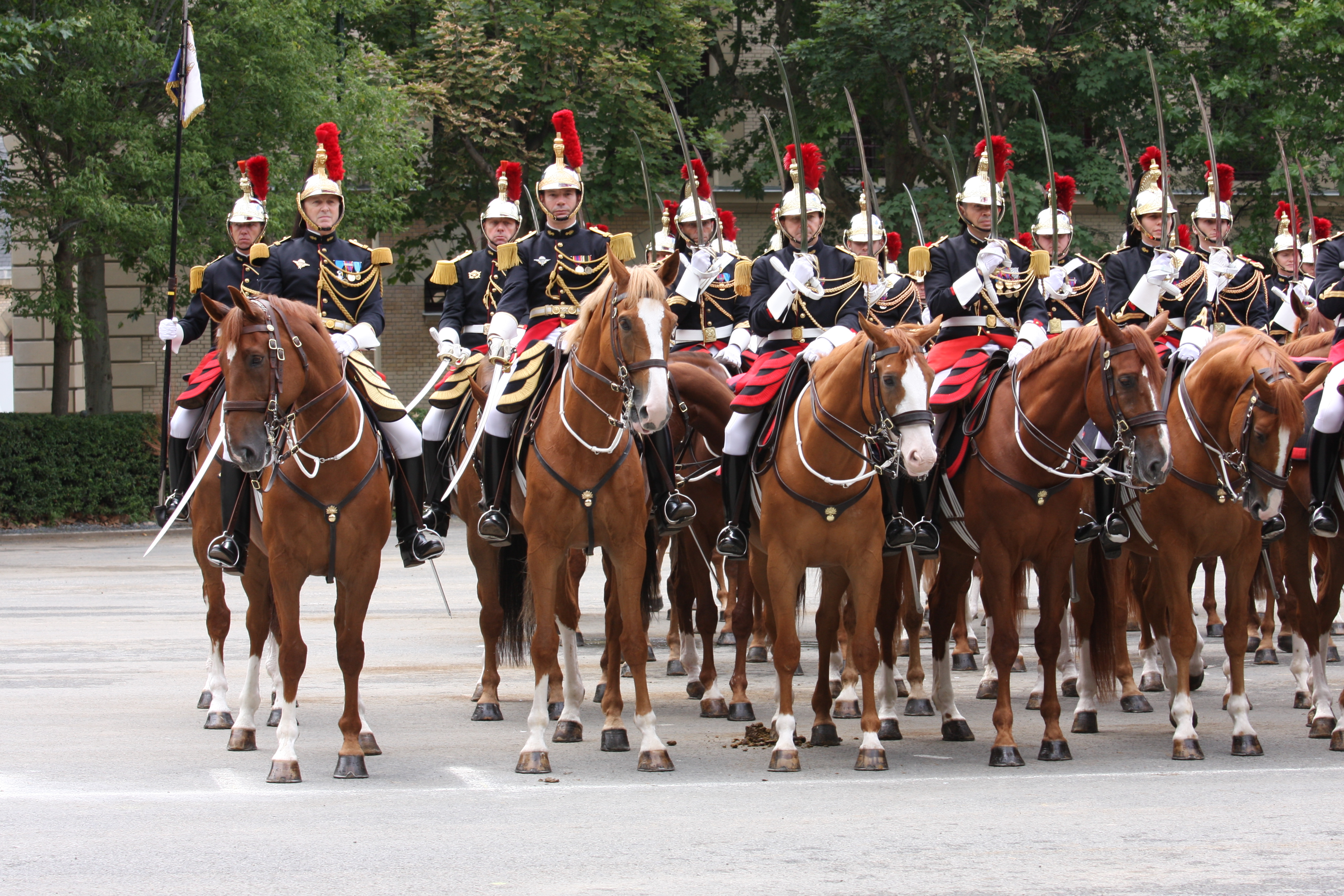
Cavalry of the Garde républicaine

Five battles are remembered on the flag of the Gendarmerie:

- Battle of Hondschoote (1793): Four hundred gendarmes of the 32nd Division (equivalent of a regiment under the Revolution) engaged in battle on the left wing of the army. They seized enemy artillery positions and lost 117 men.
- Villodrigo (1812): The 1st legion of Gendarmerie on horseback, belonging to the Brigade of Cavalry of the Army of the North, clashed with the British cavalry on 23 October 1812. Charging with sabres, they penetrated enemy lines killing 250 and taking 85 prisoners. Colonel Béteille, commanding the brigade, received twelve sabre cuts, but he survived.
- Taguin (1843): Thirty gendarmes on horseback were mobilised to take part in tracking the tribe of the emir Abd-El-Kader and participated in his capture. In a painting by Horace Vernet, which immortalises the scene and hangs in the Musée de Versailles, the gendarmes appear alongside the Algerian Governor-General, Henri d'Orléans, duc d'Aumale.
- Sevastopol (1855): Two infantry battalions of the Regiment of Gendarmerie of the Imperial Guard participated in taking the city. The 1st battalion seized a strategic position that contributed towards the final victory. A total of 153 Gendarmes fell during this siege.
- Indo-China (1945/1954): Three legions of infantrymen from the Republican Guard (3000 men) were formed at the end of 1946. Charged with the formation of the Cochin China Civil Guard, they assumed security roles and patrolled the borders, suffering heavy losses: 680 were killed or went missing and 1,500 were wounded.

The National Gendarmerie is still sometimes referred to as the maréchaussée (being the old name for the service). The gendarmes are also occasionally called pandores, which is a slang term derived from an 18th-century Hungarian word for "frontier guards." The symbol of the gendarmerie is a stylized grenade, which is also worn by the Italian Carabinieri and the Grenadier Guards in Britain. The budget in 2008 was approximately 7.7 billion euros.

The equivalent Dutch force, Royal Marechaussee, uses officially the old French term—which King William I, when assuming power after the fall of Napoleon, considered preferable to "gendarmerie".

== Missions ==
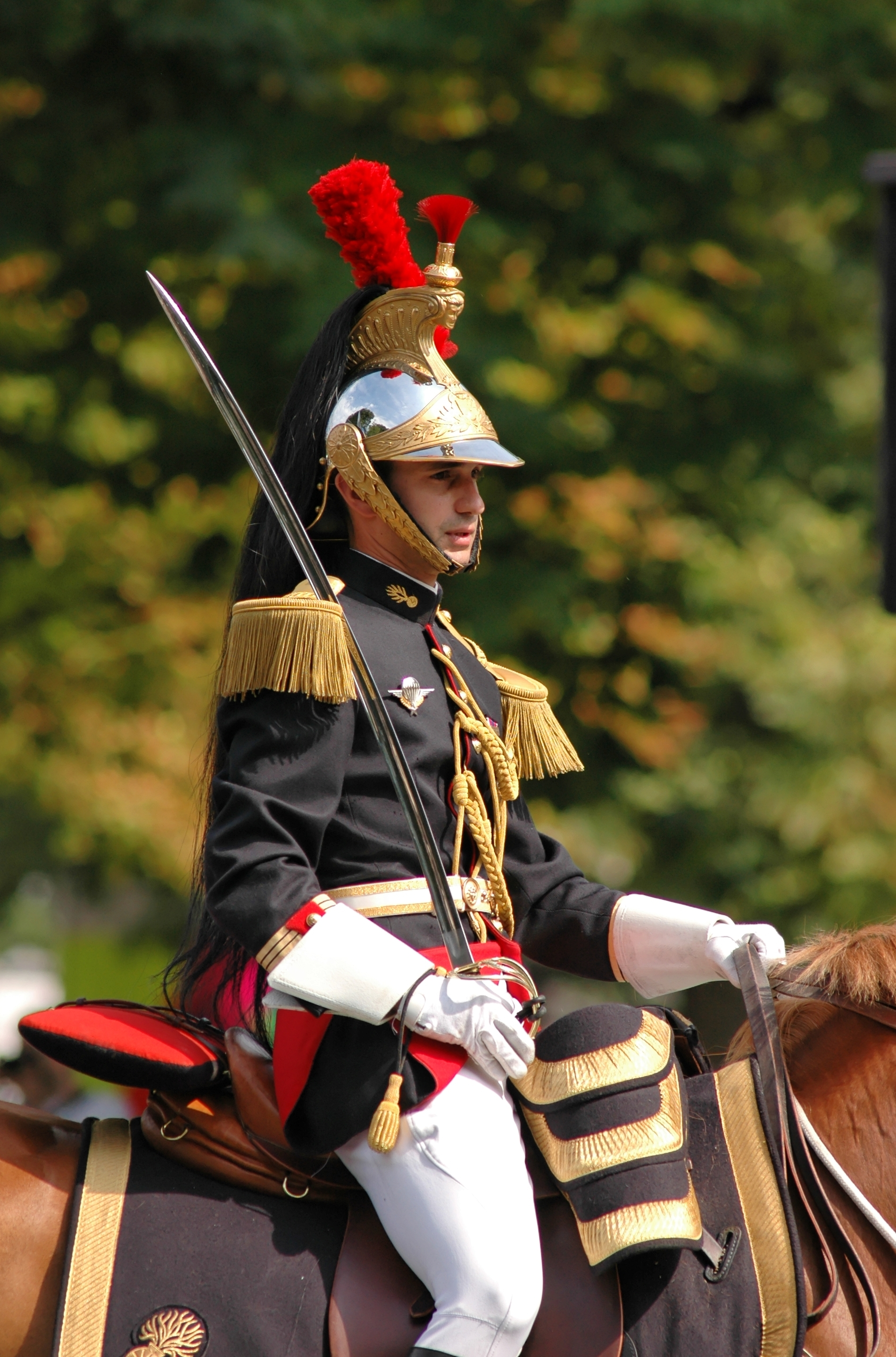
The French Republican Guard is part of the National Gendarmerie and provides security as guards of honour during official ceremonies.

In French, the term "police" not only refers to the forces, but also to the general concept of "maintenance of law and order" (policing). The Gendarmerie's missions spans three categories:

- Administrative police (police administrative), upholding public order, safety checks and traffic controls, assistance to people in imminent danger, protection duties, etc.
- Judicial police (police judiciaire), handling penal law enforcement and investigation of crimes and felonies
- Military and defense missions, including military police for the armed forces

These missions include:

- The policing of the countryside, rivers, coastal areas, and small towns with populations under 20,000, that are outside of the jurisdiction of the French National Police. The Gendarmerie's area of responsibility represents approx. 95% of the French territory and 50% of the population of France
- Criminal investigations under the supervision of the judiciary
- Maintaining law and order in public gatherings and demonstrations, including crowd control and other security activities
- Maritime policing
- Security of airports, civil nuclear sites and military installations
- Provision of military police services to the French military—on French territory as well as during foreign operations (OPEX, for (Opérations Extérieures)
- For the Republican Guard (Garde républicaine—which is part of the Gendarmerie), participation in the state's protocol and ceremonies

== Organization ==
The Gendarmerie, while remaining part of the French armed forces, has been attached to the Ministry of the Interior since 2009. Criminal investigations are run under the supervision of prosecutors or investigating magistrates. Gendarmerie members generally operate in uniform, and, only occasionally, in plainclothes.

=== Director-General ===
The Director-general of the Gendarmerie (DGGN) is appointed by the Council of Ministers, with the rank of Général d'Armée. The current Director-General is Général Hubert Bonneau who took office on October 31, 2024.

The Director-General organizes the operation of the Gendarmerie at two levels:

- At the operational level. The DGGN is in charge of plans, operations, procurement, training and support of the forces in the field.
- In an advisory position for government in all matters pertaining to the Gendarmerie.

=== Directorate-General ===
The Gendarmerie headquarters, called the Directorate-General of the National Gendarmerie (Direction générale de la Gendarmerie nationale (DGGN))), long located in downtown Paris, relocated in 2012 to the southern suburb of Issy-les-Moulineaux.

The Directorate-General of the national gendarmerie includes:

- The general staff, divided into offices and services,
- The inspectorate-general of the Gendarmerie (I.G.G.N.)
- Three main directorates
  - Human Resource directorate (D.P.M.G.N.)
  - Finance and Support directorate (D.S.F.)
  - Operations directorate (D.O.E.)—The general, chief of the Operations directorate, has authority on:
    - Organisation and evaluation subdirectorate,
    - International co-operation subdirectorate,
    - Defence and public order subdirectorate,
    - Public safety and road traffic safety subdirectorate,
    - Criminal Investigation subdirectorate.
- Two joint Gendarmerie/Police offices
  - Joint Information systems office (ST(SI)2)
  - Joint purchasing office (SAELSI)

=== Organization ===
The main components of the organization are Departmental Gendarmerie, Mobile Gendarmerie, Republican Guard, Overseas Gendarmerie, five specialized Gendarmerie branches, Provost Gendarmerie and Intervention Group of the National Gendarmerie. The above-mentioned organizations report directly to the Director General (DGGN) with the exception of the Republican Guard, which reports to the Île-de-France region.

==== Departmental Gendarmerie ====
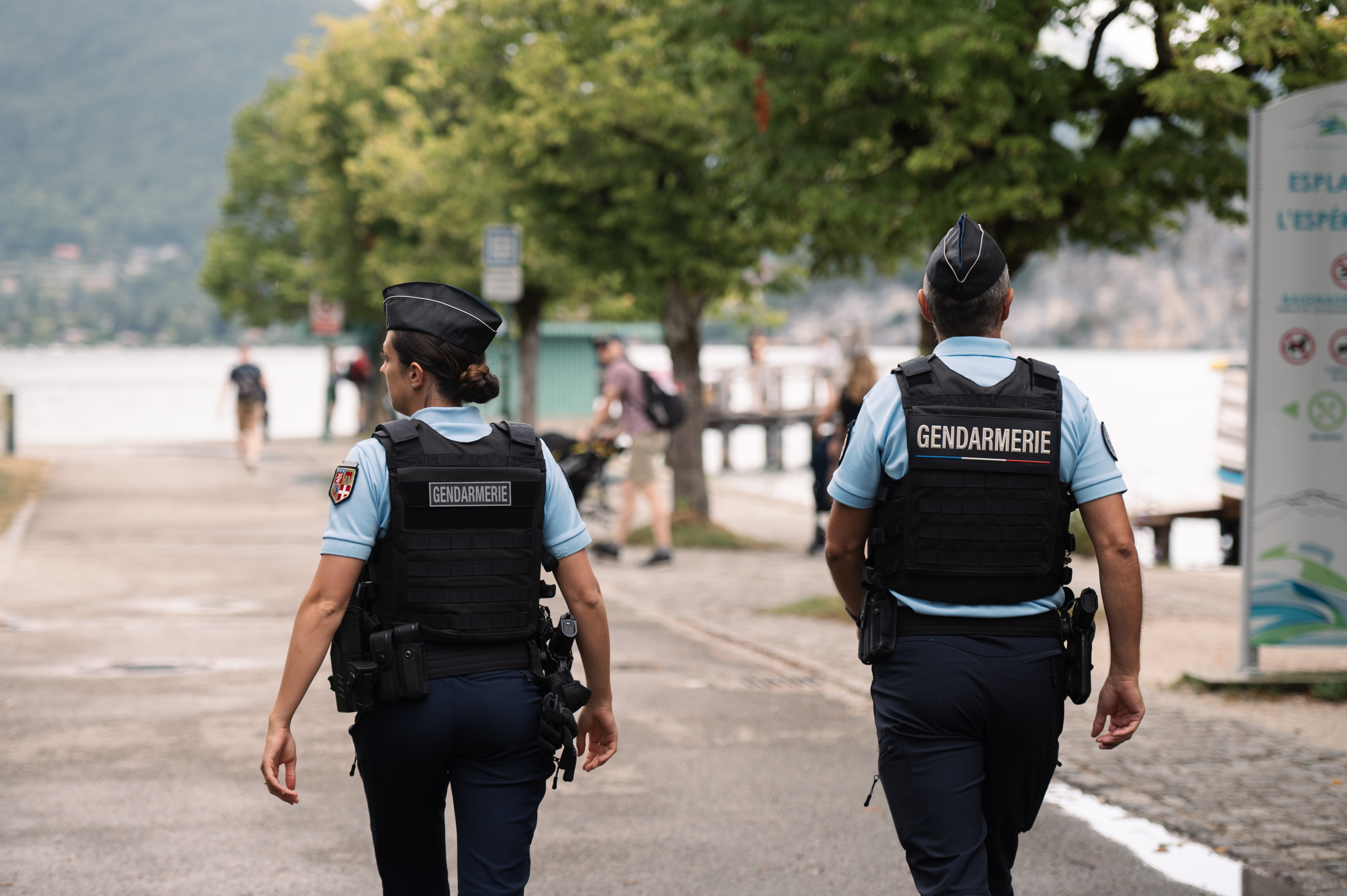
Two Departmental Gendarmes in uniform

The Departmental Gendarmerie (Gendarmerie Départementale), also named «La Blanche» (Note: After the colour of the silver stripes that the gendarmes wear on their kepis, as opposed to the golden stripes of the Mobile Gendarmerie) (The White), is the most numerous part of the Gendarmerie, is in charge of policing small towns and rural areas. Its territorial divisions are based on the administrative divisions of France, particularly the departments from which the Departmental Gendarmerie derives its name. The Departmental Gendarmerie carries out the general public order duties in municipalities with a population of up to 20,000 citizens. When that limit is exceeded, the jurisdiction over the municipality is turned over to the National Police.

It is divided into 13 metropolitan regions (Note: Since 2016, metropolitan France has been divided into 12 administrative regions.) (including Corsica), themselves divided into groupements (one for each of the 100 département, thus the name), themselves divided into compagnies (one for each of the 342 arrondissements).

It maintains gendarmerie brigades throughout the rural parts of the territory. There are two kind of brigades:

- Large autonomous territorial brigades (BTAs)
- Brigade groups composed of smaller brigades supervised by a larger one (COBs).

In addition, it has specialised units:

- Research units, who conduct criminal investigations when their difficulty exceeds the abilities of the territorial units
- Surveillance and intervention platoons (PSIGs), who conduct roving patrols and reinforce local units as needed.
- Specialized brigades for prevention of juvenile delinquency
- Highway patrol units.
- Mountain units, specialised in surveillance and search and rescue operations, as well as inquiries in mountainous areas

In addition, the Gendarmerie runs a national criminal police institute (Institut de recherche criminelle de la gendarmerie nationale) specializing in supporting local units for difficult investigations.

The research units may be called into action by the judiciary even within cities (i.e. in the National Police's area of responsibility). As an example, the Paris research section of the Gendarmerie was in charge of the investigations into the vote-rigging allegations in the 5th district of Paris (see corruption scandals in the Paris region).

Gendarmes normally operate in uniform. They may operate in plainclothes only for specific missions and with their supervisors' authorisation.

==== Mobile Gendarmerie ====
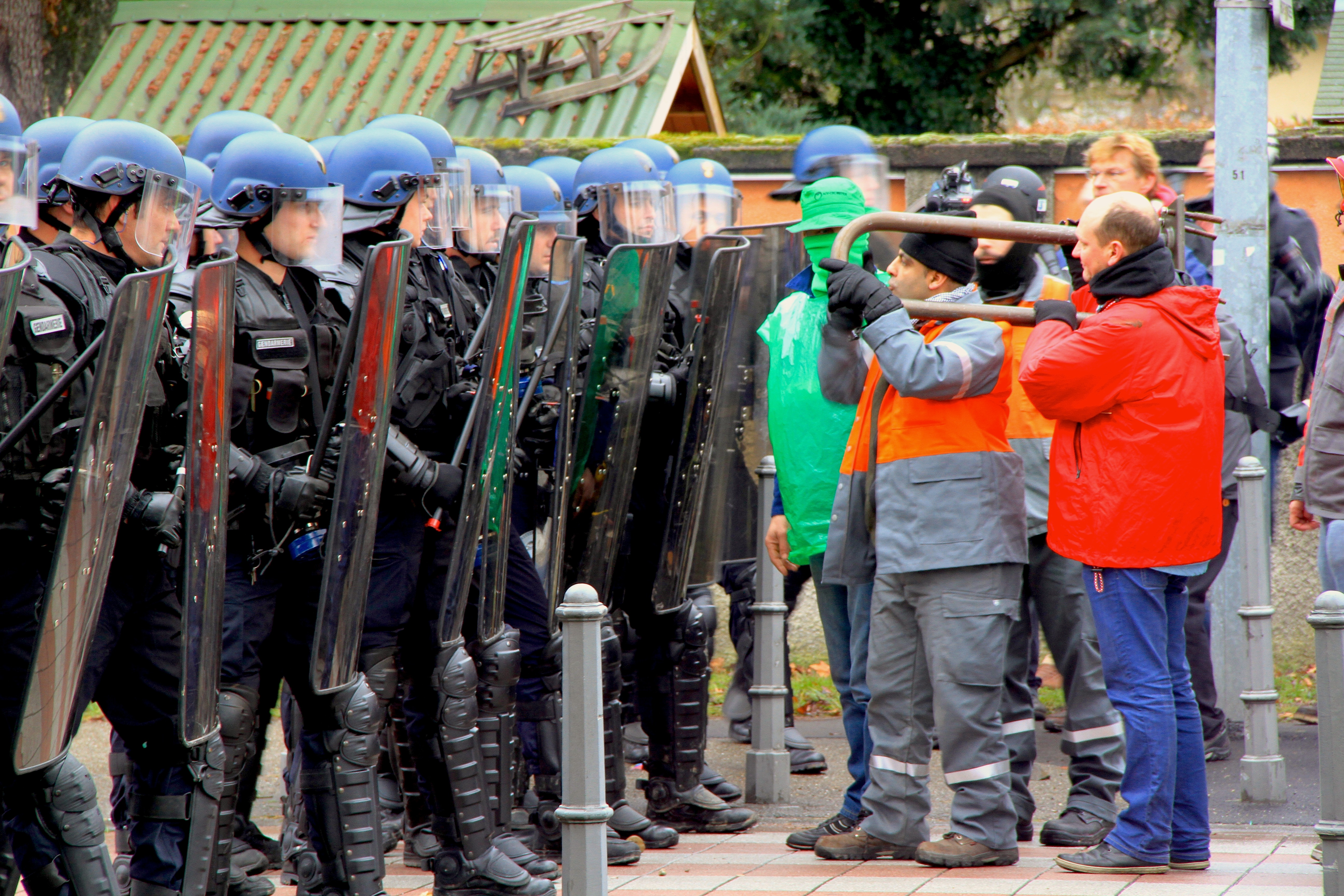
Mobile gendarmes during a demonstration

The Mobile Gendarmerie (Gendarmerie Mobile), also named La Jaune ("The Yellow"), is organized in seven Regions of the Mobile Gendarmerie (one for each of the seven military regions of metropolitan France, called (Zones de Défense). It comprises 18 Groupements de Gendarmerie mobile (Groupings) featuring 109 squadrons (Note: Squadron in the British sense of the term. The equivalent US unit would be a troop or a company.) for a total of approx. 11,300 personnel.

Its main responsibilities are:

- crowd and riot control
- general security in support of the Departmental Gendarmerie
- military and defense missions
- missions that require large amounts of personnel (Vigipirate counter-terrorism patrols, searches in the countryside, etc.)

Nearly 20% of the Mobile Gendarmerie squadrons are permanently deployed on a rotational basis in the French overseas territories. Other units deploy occasionally abroad alongside French troops engaged in military operations (called external operations or OPEX).

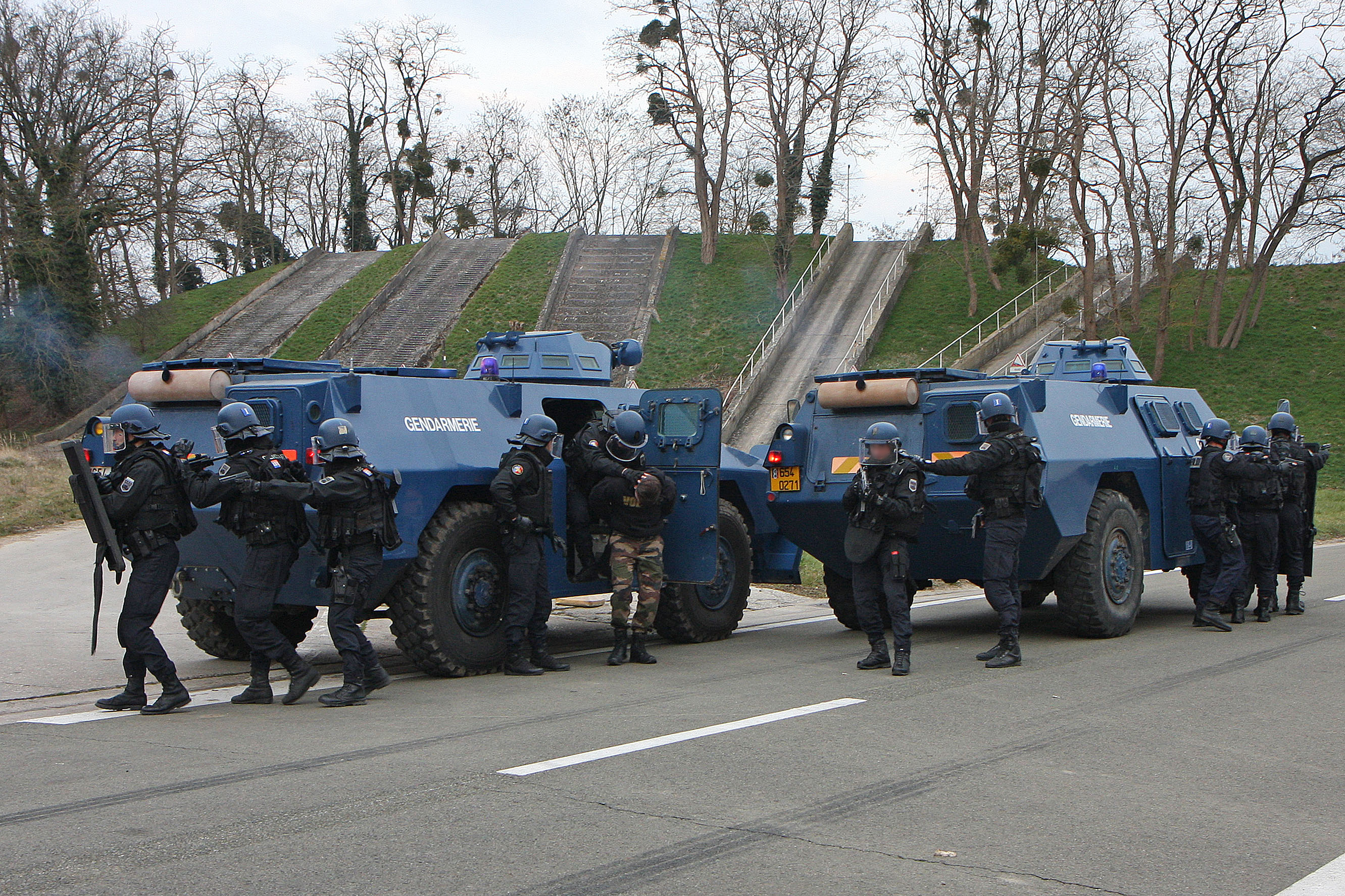
GBGM riot control training

The civilian tasks of the mobile gendarmerie are similar to those of the police units known as Compagnies Républicaines de Sécurité (CRS), for which they are often mistaken. Easy ways to distinguish them include:

- the uniform of the CRS is dark blue, the mobile gendarmerie are clad in black jackets and dark blue trousers;
- the CRS wear a big red CRS patch; the gendarmes' patches have stylised grenades.
- the helmet of the mobile gendarmerie is blue. The CRS helmet is black with two yellow stripes

The Mobile Gendarmerie includes Groupement Blindé de la Gendarmerie Nationale (GBGM), an armoured group of seven squadrons equipped with the Berliet VXB-170 armored personnel carrier, known in the Gendarmerie as the Véhicule Blindé à Roues de la Gendarmerie (VBRG, "Gendarmerie armoured wheeled vehicle"). It is based at Versailles-Satory. The unit also specializes in CBRN defense.

==== Republican Guard ====
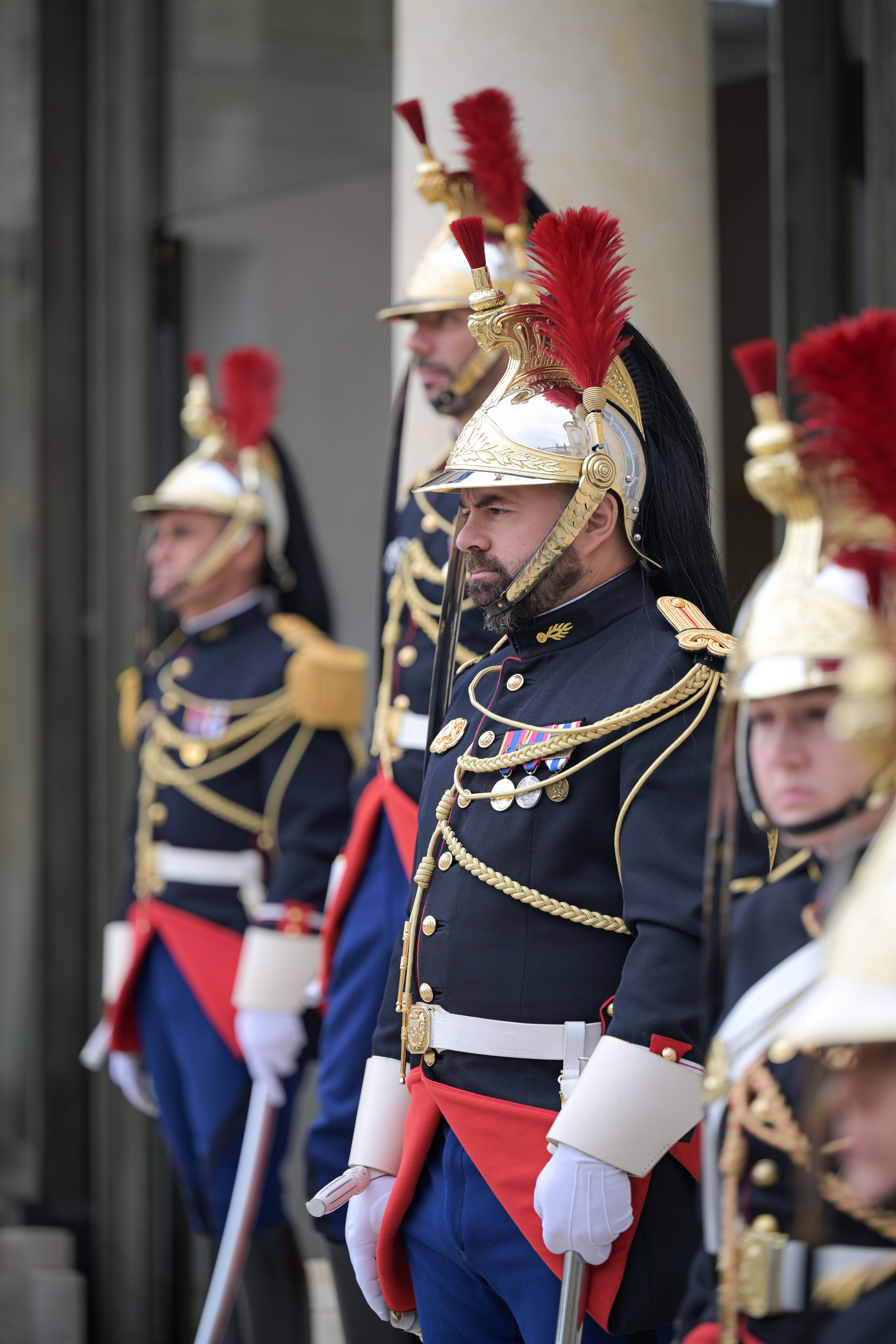
Republican Guard at the Élysée Palace, Paris

The Republican Guard is a ceremonial unit based in Paris. Their missions include:

- It provides protection and ceremonial guard for the President of The Republic, the Prime Minister, their official residencies and both chambers of the French Parliament.
- Guarding important public buildings in Paris such as the Élysée Palace, Hôtel Matignon, the Senate, the National Assembly, the Hall of Justice, and keeping public order in Paris.
- Honour and security services for the highest national personalities and important foreign guests;
- Support of other law enforcement forces (with intervention groups, or horseback patrols);
- Staffing horseback patrol stations, particularly for the forests of the Île-de-France region

==== Overseas Gendarmerie ====
The non-metropolitan branches include units serving in the French overseas départements and territories (such as the Gendarmerie of Saint-Pierre and Miquelon), staff at the disposal of independent States for technical co-operation, Germany, security guards in French embassies and consulates abroad.

==== Specialized Gendarmerie branches ====
===== Air Gendarmerie =====
The Air Gendarmerie (Gendarmerie de l'Air) is placed under the dual supervision of the Gendarmerie and the Air Force, it fulfills police and security missions in the air bases, and goes on the site of an accident involving military aircraft.

===== Maritime Gendarmerie =====
Placed under the dual supervision of the Gendarmerie and the Navy, its missions include:

- police and security in the naval bases;
- maritime surveillance;
- police at sea;
- assistance and rescue at sea.

===== Air Transport Gendarmerie =====
The Air Transport Gendarmerie (Gendarmerie des Transports Aériens) is placed under the dual supervision of the Gendarmerie and the direction of civilian aviation of the transportation ministry, its missions include:

- police and security in civilian airfields and airports;
- filtering access to aircraft, counter-terrorism and counter-narcotic activities, freight surveillance;
- surveillance of technical installations of the airports (control tower...);
- traffic control on the roads within the airports;
- protection of important visitors;
- judiciary inquiries pertaining to accidents of civilian aircraft.

===== Ordnance Gendarmerie =====
The Ordnance Gendarmerie (Gendarmerie de l'Armement) fulfills police and security missions in the establishments of the Délégation Générale pour l'Armement (France's defence procurement agency).

===== Nuclear ordnance security Gendarmerie =====
Nuclear ordnance security Gendarmerie insignia

The Nuclear ordnance security Gendarmerie (Gendarmerie de la sécurité des armements nucléaires, GSAN) was created in 1964. It is directly subordinated to the Ministry of Armed Forces and plays a major role in the security chain of the nuclear devices.

The main mission of this specific branch is to secure the government's control over all the nuclear forces and weapons. The security of the civil nuclear powerplants and research establishments is provided by specialized units of the Departmental Gendarmerie. More specifically, the gendarmes of this unit are responsible for ensuring the protection and the readiness of the different kinds of missiles used by the French Navy and Air Force.

In order to do so, the GSAN is composed of its own units and of units from other branches of the gendarmerie, temporary placed under its command like squadrons of the Mobile Gendarmerie to protect the convoys of nuclear weapons components. For instance, a special security platoon can be deployed on board of the French aircraft carrier Charles de Gaulle to secure the nuclear weapons carried on the ship.

==== Provost Gendarmerie ====
The Provost Gendarmerie (Gendarmerie prévôtale), created in 2013, is the military police of the French Army deployed outside metropolitan France. The functions of military police for the French Army on French soil are fulfilled by units of the Departmental Gendarmerie.

==== National Gendarmerie Intervention Group ====
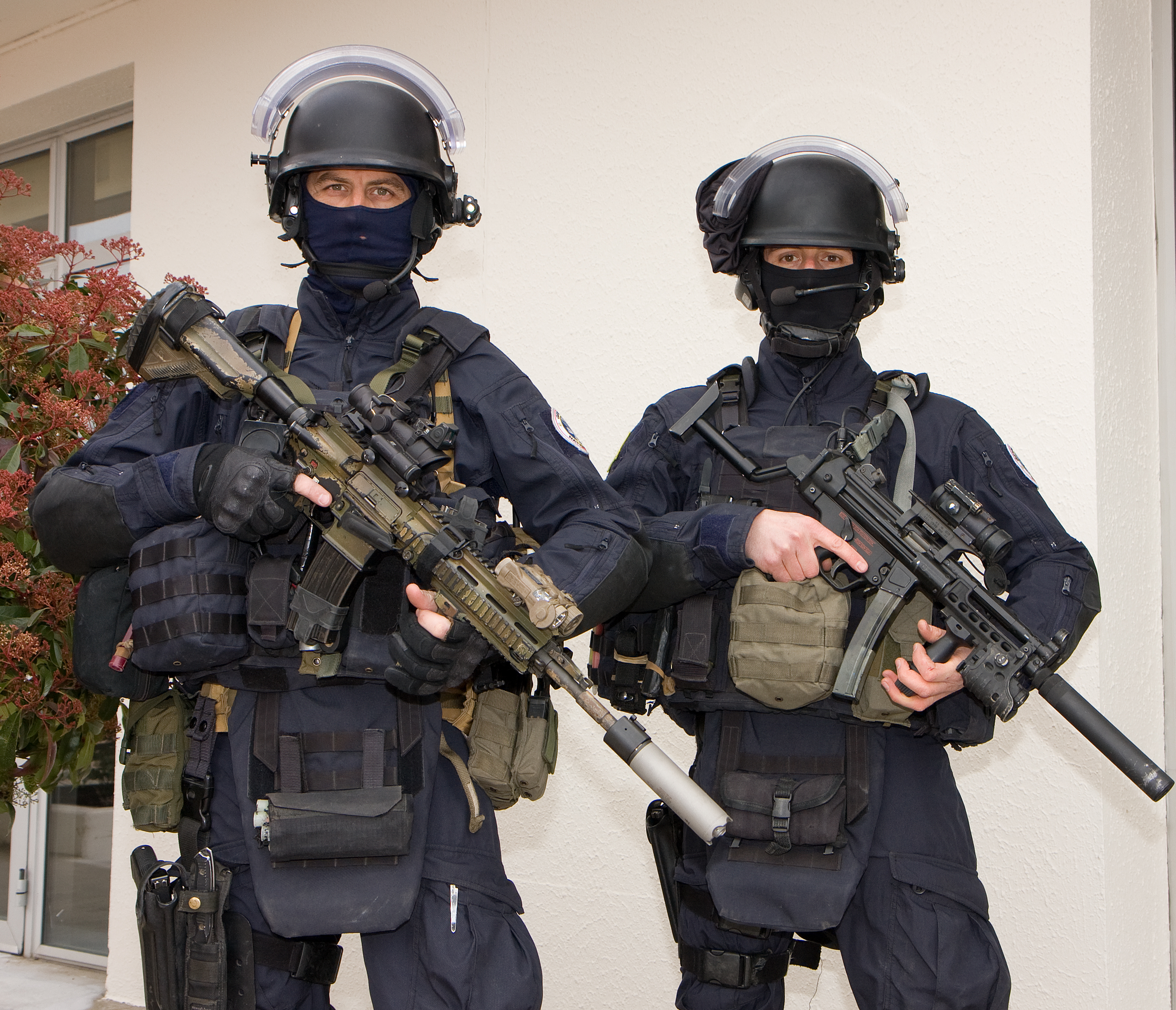
GIGN operators

GIGN (Groupe d'intervention de la Gendarmerie nationale) is one of the two premier counter-terror formations in France. Its counterpart within the National Police is the RAID. Operatives from both formations make up the protective detail of the French President (the GSPR). Its missions include counter-terrorism, hostage rescue, surveillance of national threats, protection of government officials and targeting of organized crime.

GIGN was established in 1974 following the Munich massacre. Created initially as a relatively small police tactical unit specialized in sensitive hostage situations, it has since grown into a larger and more diversified force of nearly 400 members. (Note: c. 570 with the regional branches)

Many of its missions are classified, and members are not allowed to be publicly photographed. Since its formation, GIGN has been involved in over 1,800 missions and rescued more than 600 hostages, making it one of the most experienced counter-terrorism units in the world. The unit came into prominence following its successful assault on a hijacked Air France flight at Marseille Marignane airport in December 1994.

== Foreign service ==
Gendarmerie units have served in :

- Syria
- Lebanon
- Algeria
- Kosovo (within MSU)
- Rwanda
- Ivory Coast
- Bosnia-Herzegovina
- Haiti
- Central Africa
- North Macedonia
- Afghanistan

== Uniforms ==
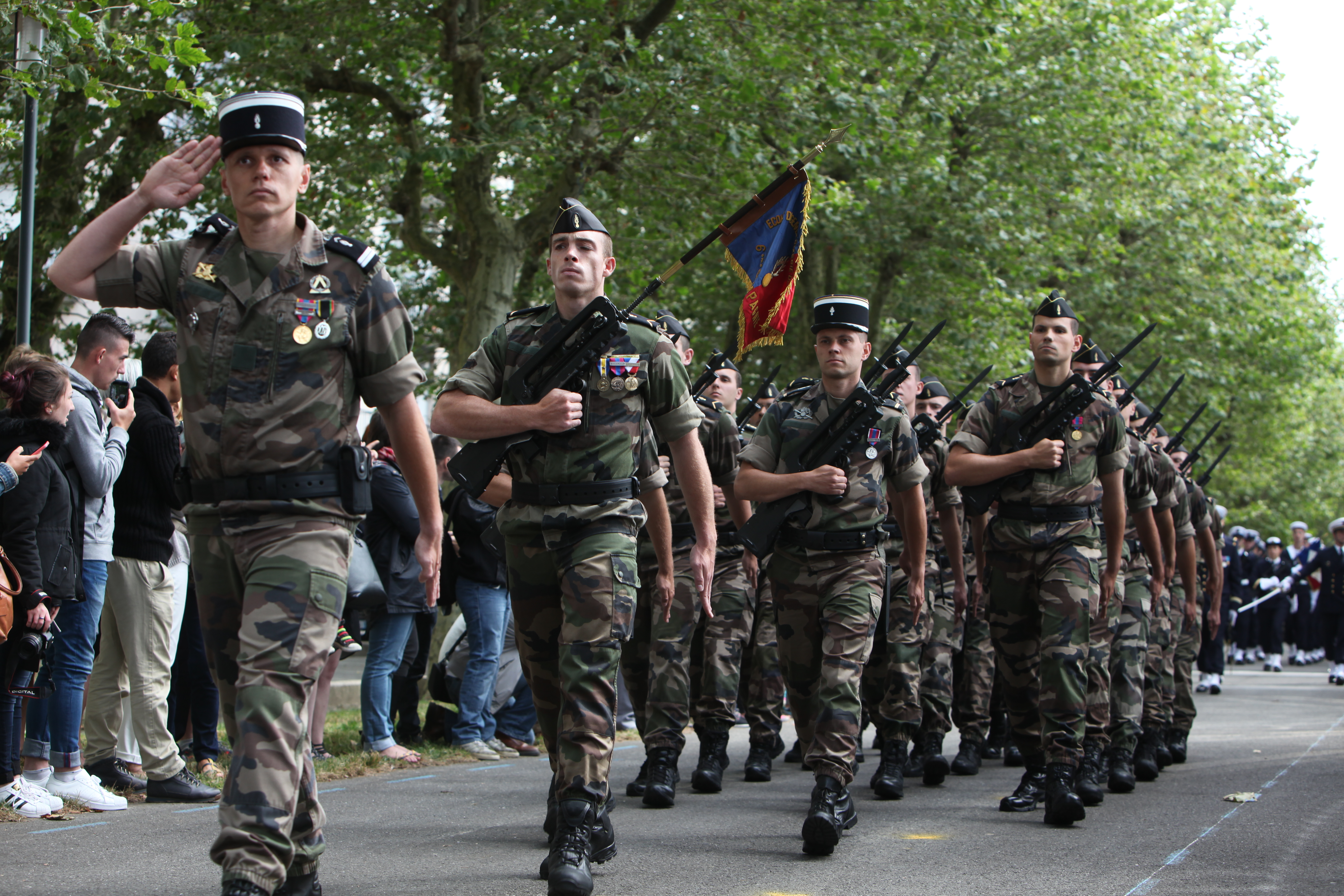
Camouflage Central-Europe (CCE) uniform in Gendarmerie use

The uniform of the Gendarmerie has undergone many changes since the establishment of the corps. Throughout most of the 19th century a wide bicorne was worn with a dark blue coat or tunic. Trousers were light blue. White aiguillettes were a distinguishing feature. In 1905 the bicorne was replaced by a dark blue kepi with white braiding, which had increasingly been worn as a service headdress. A silver crested helmet with plume, modelled on that of the French cuirassiers, was adopted as a parade headdress until 1914. Following World War I a relatively simple uniform was adopted for the Gendarmerie, although traditional features such as the multiple-cord aiguillette and the dark blue/light blue colour combination were retained.

Since 2006 a more casual "relaxed uniform" has been authorised for ordinary duties (see photograph below). The kepi however continues in use for dress occasions. Special items of clothing and equipment are issued for the various functions required of the Gendarmerie. The cavalry and infantry of the Republican Guard retain historic ceremonial uniforms dating from the 19th century.

=== Gallery ===
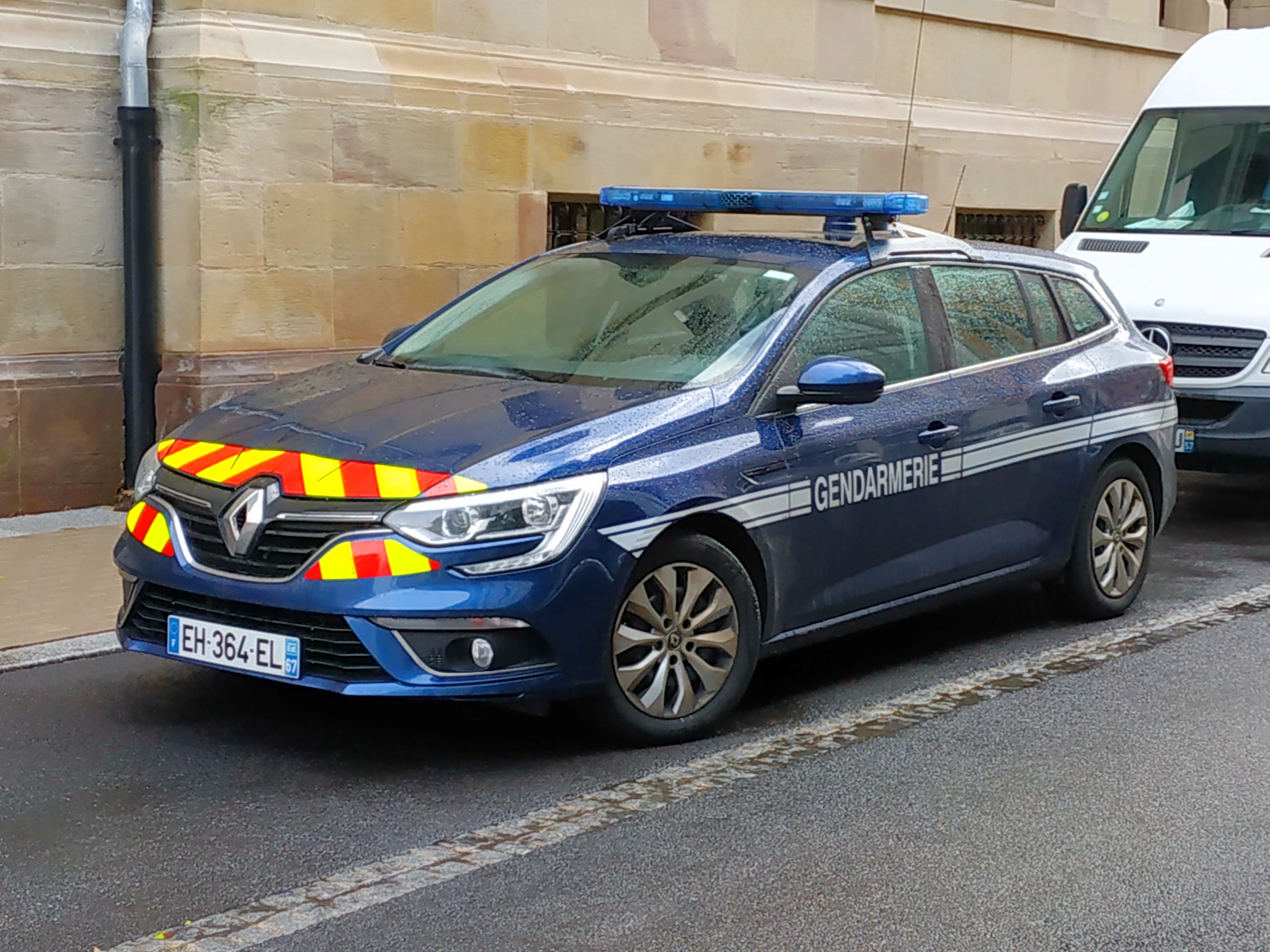
Renault Mégane with the new gendarmerie colors

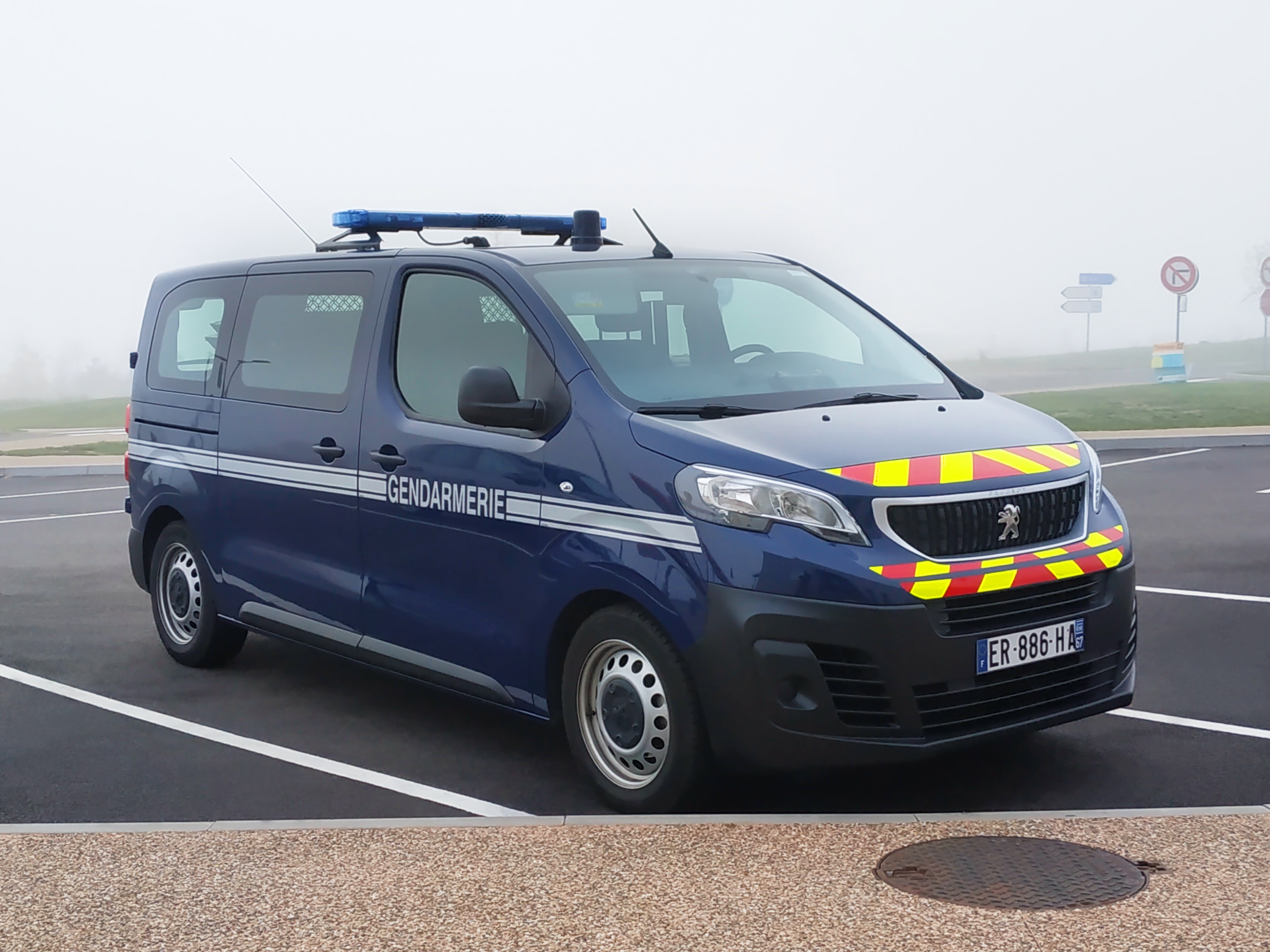
Peugeot Traveller used by the Gendarmerie in 2019

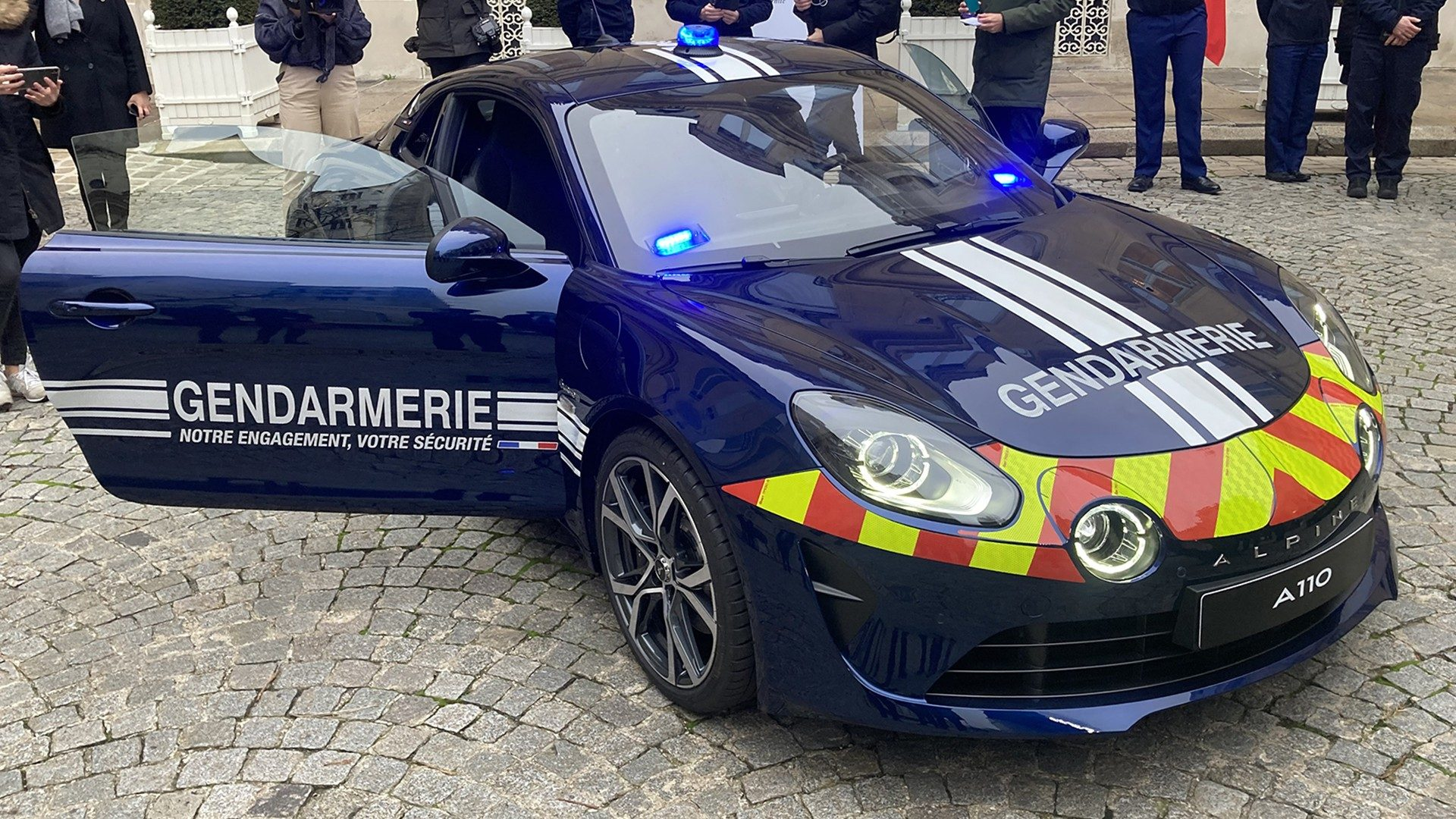
Alpine A110 operated by the ERI

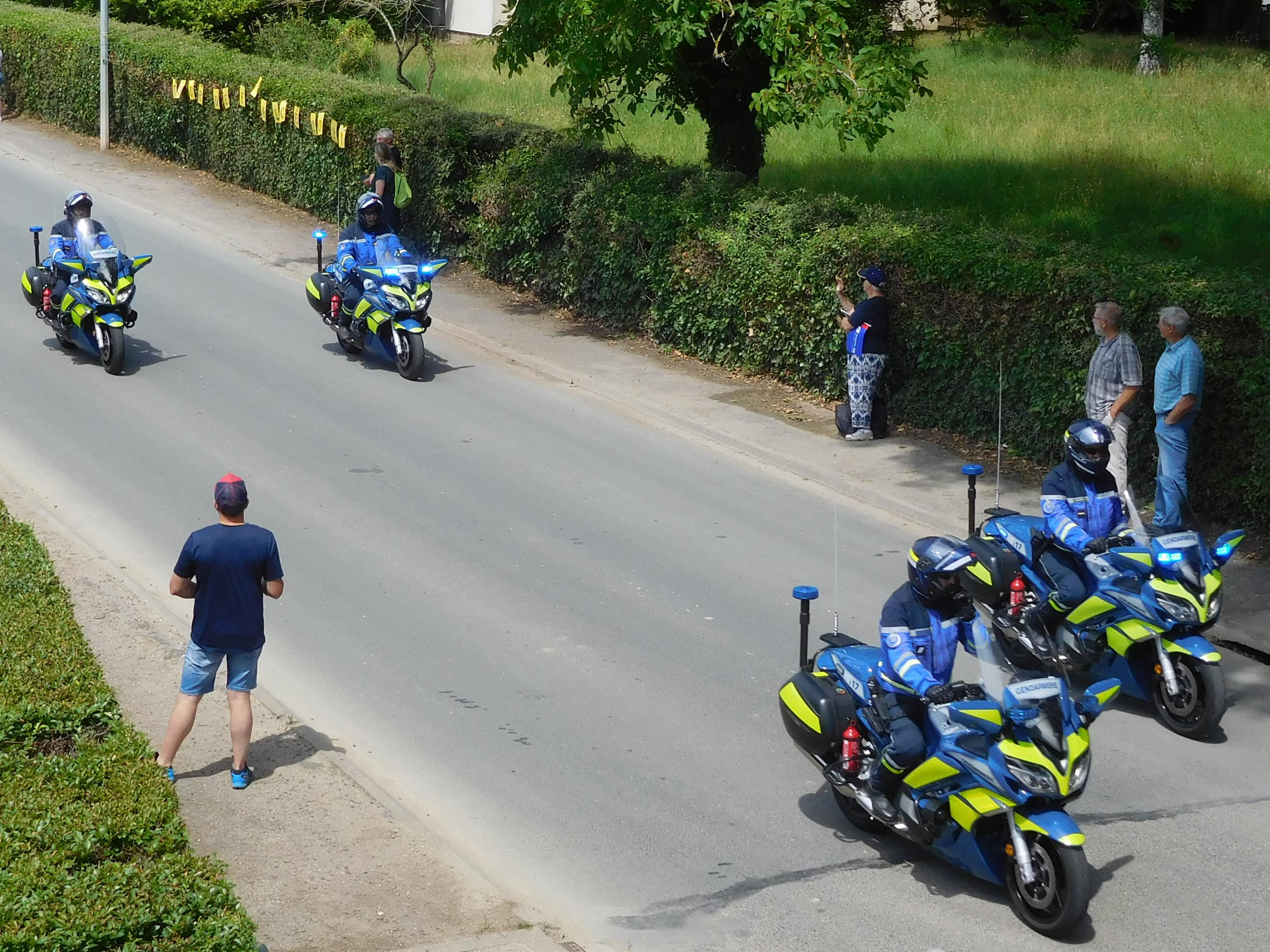
Gendarmerie's motorcyclist during Tour de France 2021

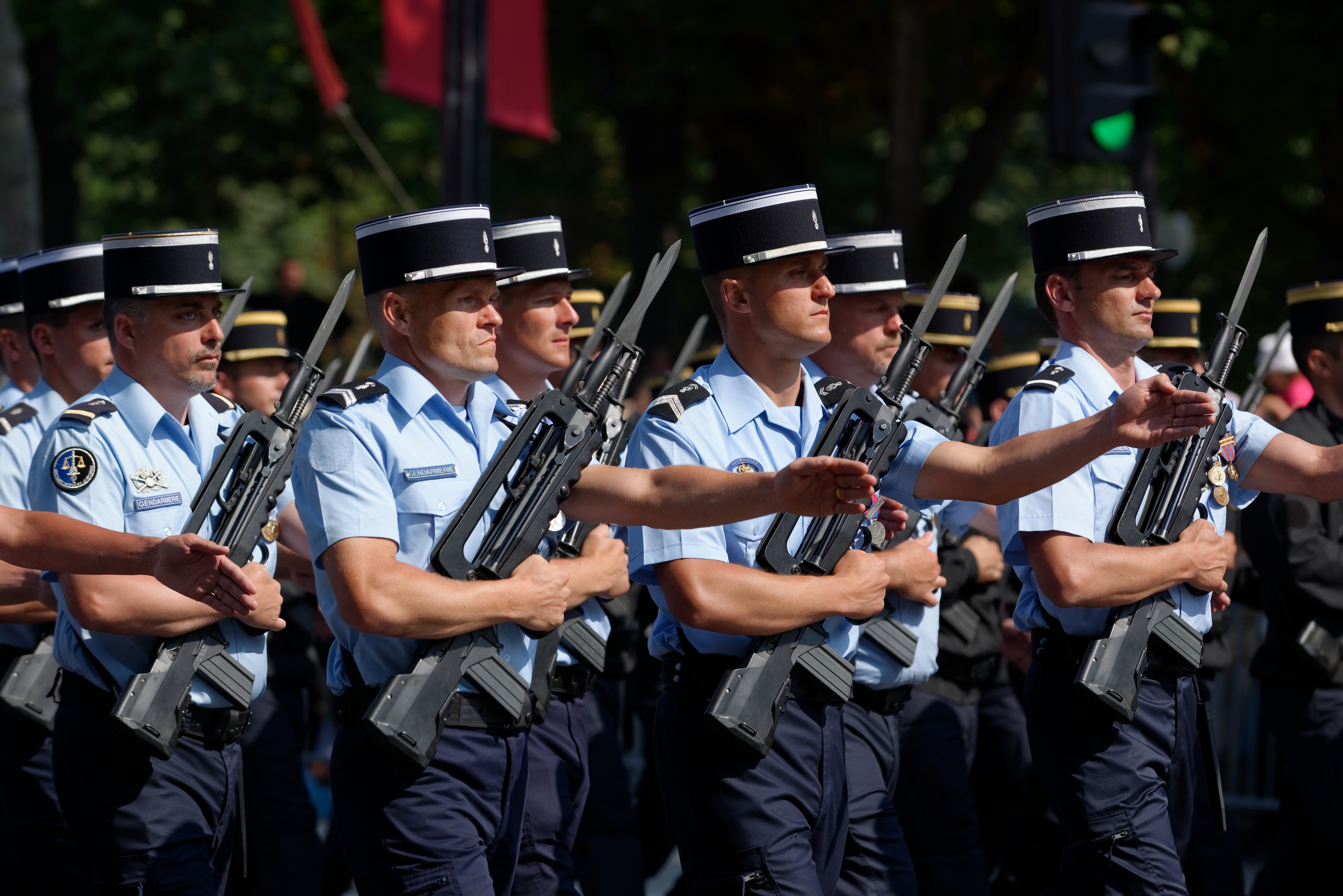
Air Transport Gendarmerie Bastille Day 2013 Paris

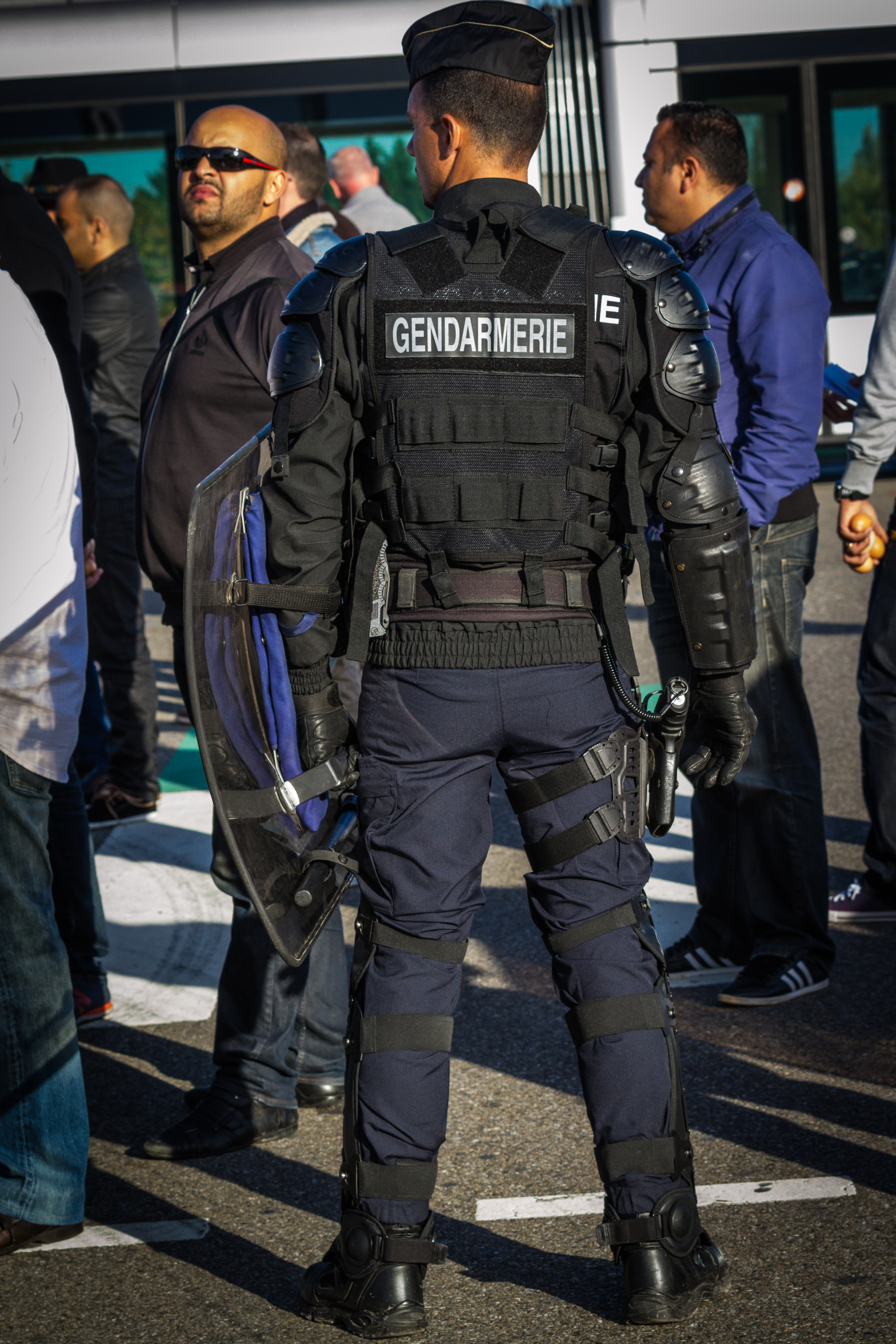
Gendarme mobile

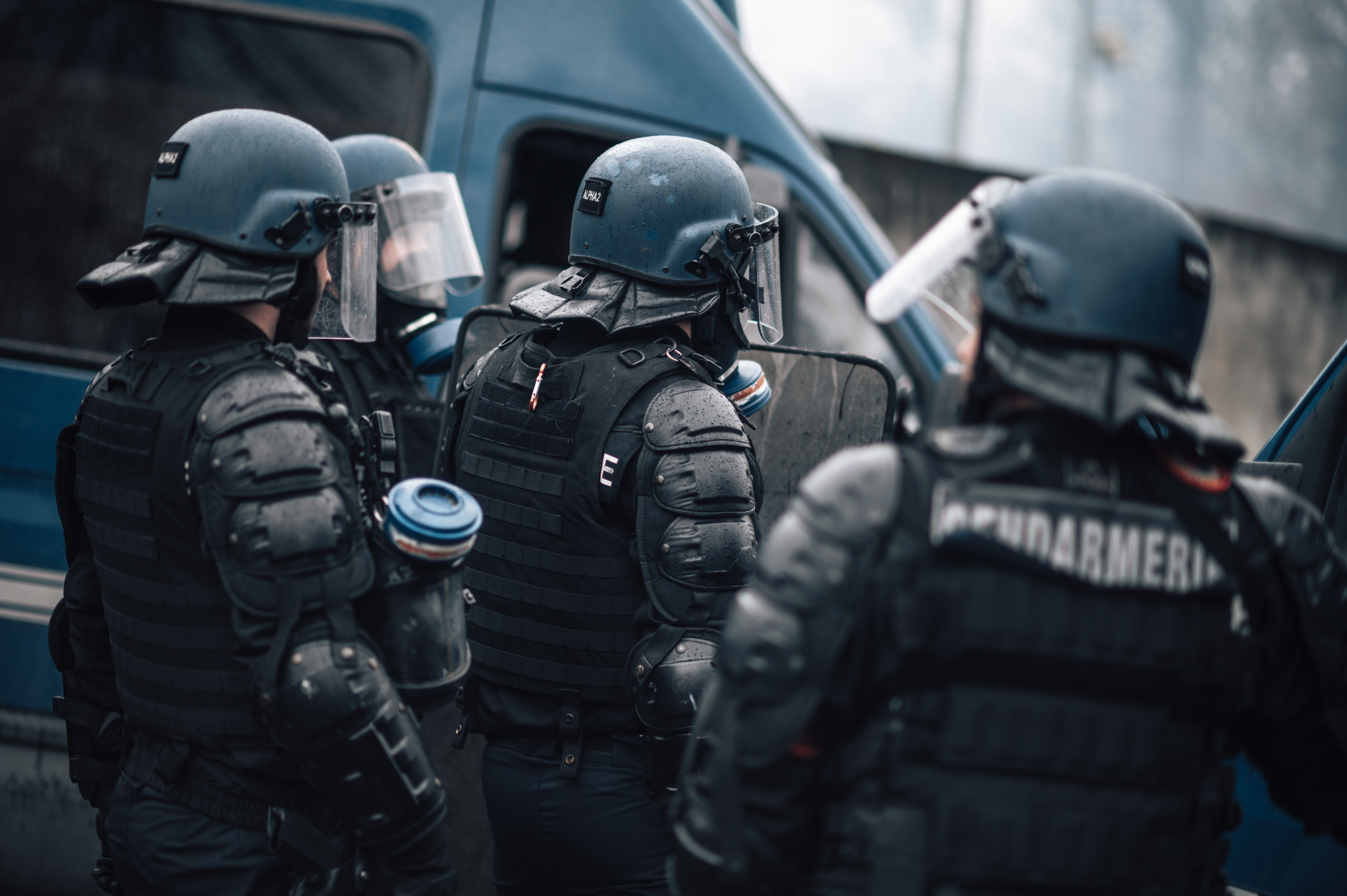
Some gendarmes mobiles equipped with shields and gas mask

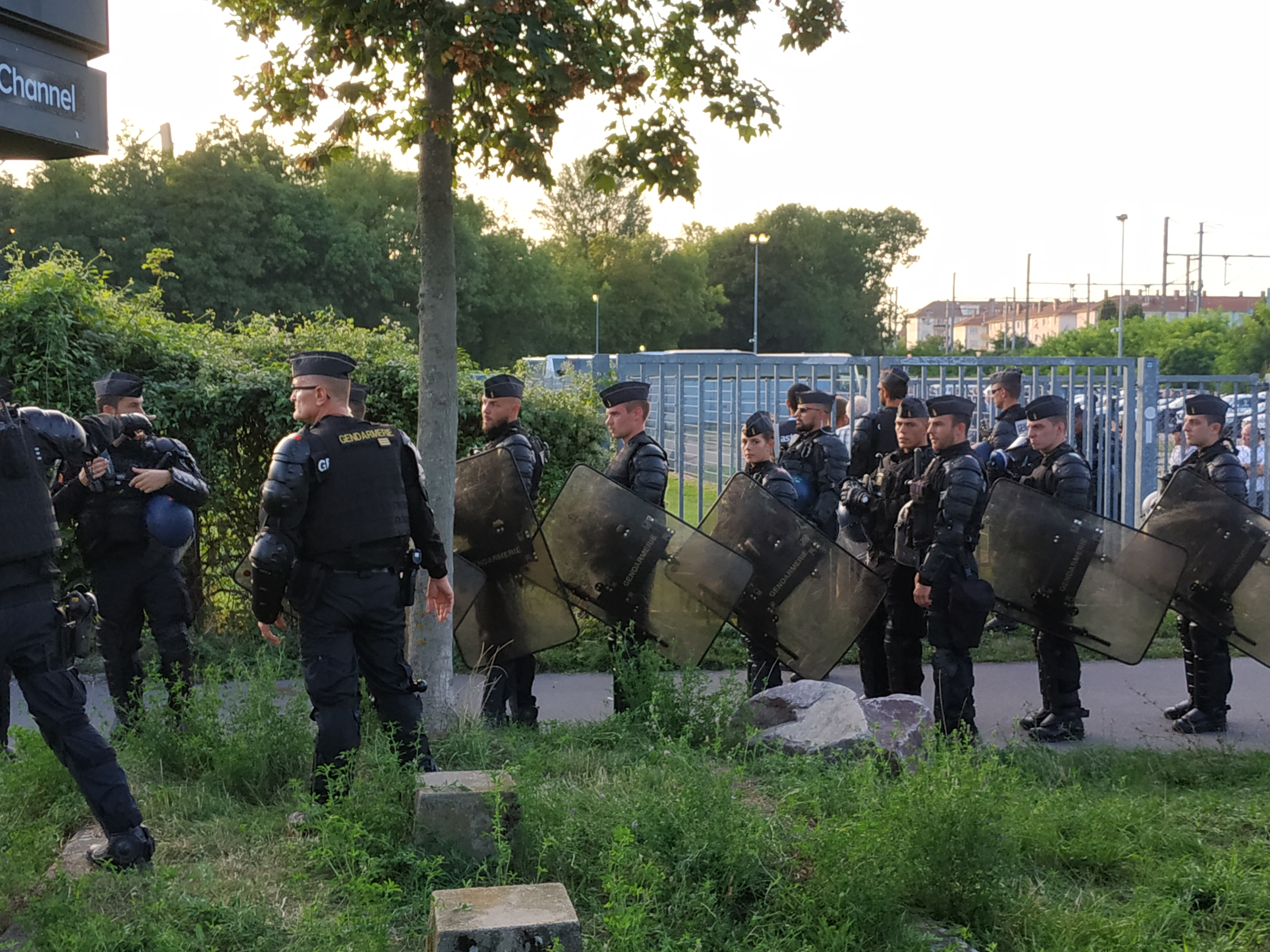
Some gendarmes mobiles securing a football match in Strasbourg

== Ranks ==
| NATO code | OF-10 | OF-9 | OF-8 | OF-7 | OF-6 | OF-5 | OF-4 | OF-3 | OF-2 | OF-1 | | | |
|---|---|---|---|---|---|---|---|---|---|---|---|---|---|
| Rank title | | Général d'armée | Général de corps d'armée | Général de division | Général de brigade | Colonel | Lieutenant-Colonel | Chef d'Escadron | Capitaine | Lieutenant | Sous-Lieutenant | Aspirant | Élève-officier |
| Departmental Gendarmerie | No equivalent | | | | No equivalent | | | | | | | | |
| Air Transport Gendarmerie | No equivalent | | | | No equivalent | | | | | | | | |
| Armament Gendarmerie | No equivalent | | | | No equivalent | | | | | | | | |
| (France) Mobile Gendarmerie | No equivalent | | | | | | | | | | | | |
| Republican Guard | No equivalent | | | | | | | | | | | | |
| Air Gendarmerie | No equivalent | | | | | | | | | | No equivalent | No equivalent | |
| Maritime Gendarmerie | No equivalent | | | | | | | | | | No equivalent | No equivalent | |
| Technical and Administrative Service | No equivalent | | | | No equivalent | | | | | | | No equivalent | |
| NATO code | OF-10 | OF-9 | OF-8 | OF-7 | OF-6 | OF-5 | OF-4 | OF-3 | OF-2 | OF-1 | | | |

| NATO code | OR-9 | | OR-8 | OR-7 | OR-6 | OR-5 | | | | OR-4 | OR-3 | OR-2 | OR-1 |
|---|---|---|---|---|---|---|---|---|---|---|---|---|---|
| Rank title | Major | Adjudant-chef | Adjudant | | Maréchal des Logis-Chef | Gendarme | Gendarme sous contrat | Élève Sous-officer | Gendarme Adjoint Maréchal-des-logis | Gendarme Adjoint Brigadier Chef | Gendarme Adjoint Brigadier | Gendarme Adjoint première classe | Gendarme Adjoint |
| Departmental Gendarmerie | | | | No equivalent | | | | | | | | | |
| Air Transport Gendarmerie | | | | No equivalent | | | | | | | | | |
| Armament Gendarmerie | | | | No equivalent | | | | | | | | | |
| (France) Mobile Gendarmerie | | | | No equivalent | | | | | | | | | |
| Republican Guard | | | | No equivalent | | | | | | | | | |
| Air Gendarmerie | | | | No equivalent | | | No equivalent | | | | | | |
| Maritime Gendarmerie | | | | No equivalent | | | No equivalent | | | | | | |
| Technical and Administrative Service | | | | No equivalent | | | | | No equivalent | | | | |
| NATO code | OR-9 | | OR-8 | OR-7 | OR-6 | OR-5 | | | | OR-4 | OR-3 | OR-2 | OR-1 |

== Personnel ==
As of 31 December 2018, the National Gendarmerie consisted of approx. 98,000 personnel units. Career gendarmes are either commissioned or non-commissioned officers. The lower ranks consist of auxiliary gendarmes on limited-time/term contracts. The 102,269 personnel of the National Gendarmerie is divided into:

- 6,203 officers and 74,105 NCOs of gendarmerie;
- 595 officers and 4,592 NCOs of the technical and administrative body;
- 12,602 section volunteers, from voluntary gendarmes (AGIV) and voluntary assistant gendarmes (GAV);
- 4,424 civilian personnel are divided into civil servants, state workers and contracted workers;
- 66,425 reserve personnel. This reserve force had not yet reached the authorised size limit. Only 25,000 men and women were signed up for reserve engagements (E.S.R.).

This personnel mans the following units:

Départemental Gendarmerie

- 1,055 Community brigades;
- 697 autonomous brigades;
- 370 Surveillance and Intervention Platoons (PSIG);
- 271 Dog-handling Teams;
- 17 Mountain Platoons;
- 92 Departmental Brigades for Investigations and Judicial Services;
- 383 Research sections and brigades;
- 14 Air Sections;
- 7 River Brigades;
- 26 Coastal brigades;
- 93 departmental squadrons for roadway security;
- 136 Highway Platoons;
- 37 brigades for the prevention of juvenile delinquency;
- 21 Centers for Information and Recruitment.

Gendarmerie Mobile

- 109 squadrons (two more squadrons were created in late 2023)

Special formations

- 5 cavalry squadrons and 10 infantry companies of Republican Guard;
- 40 brigades of gendarmerie for air transports and research sections (BGTA);
- 8 Protection Units;
- 19 Air sections and detachments;
- 18 gendarmerie armament units.

Other units

- 3 673 personnel overseas posts;
- 74 brigades and postes of the maritime gendarmerie;
- 54 brigades of Air Gendarmerie;
- 23 schools and Instruction Centers.

=== Prospective Centre ===
The Gendarmerie nationale's Prospective Centre (CPGN), which was created in 1998 by an ordinance of the Minister for Defence, is one of the gendarmerie's answers to officials' willingness to modernise the State. Under the direct authority of the general director of the gendarmerie, it is located in Penthièvre barracks on Avenue Delcassé in Paris and managed by Mr Frédéric LENICA, (assisted by a general secretary, Colonel LAPPRAND) "maître des requêtes" in the Conseil d'Etat.

== Equipment ==
=== Cars ===
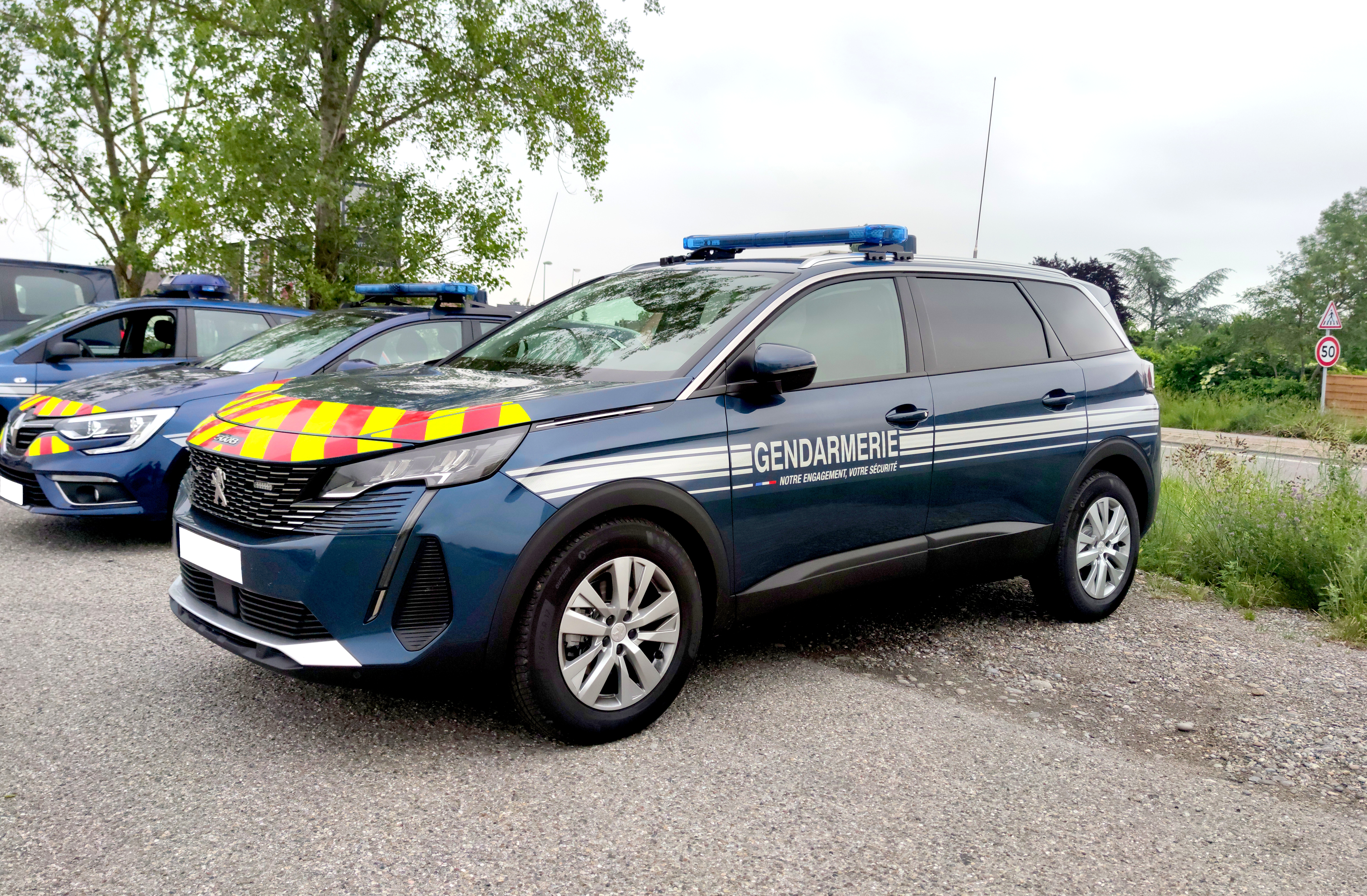
Peugeot 5008 used by the Gendarmerie

The National Gendarmerie uses varieties of different European cars in the fleet, such as the Renault Megane, Peugeot Partner, Renault Scénic, Ford Ranger, Peugeot 5008, and the Škoda Kodiaq. The design of Gendarmerie cars are blue cars with white stripes on the side. and chevrons on the front and rear of the car. With the word "GENDARMERIE" on both sides of the car.

=== Armoured vehicles ===
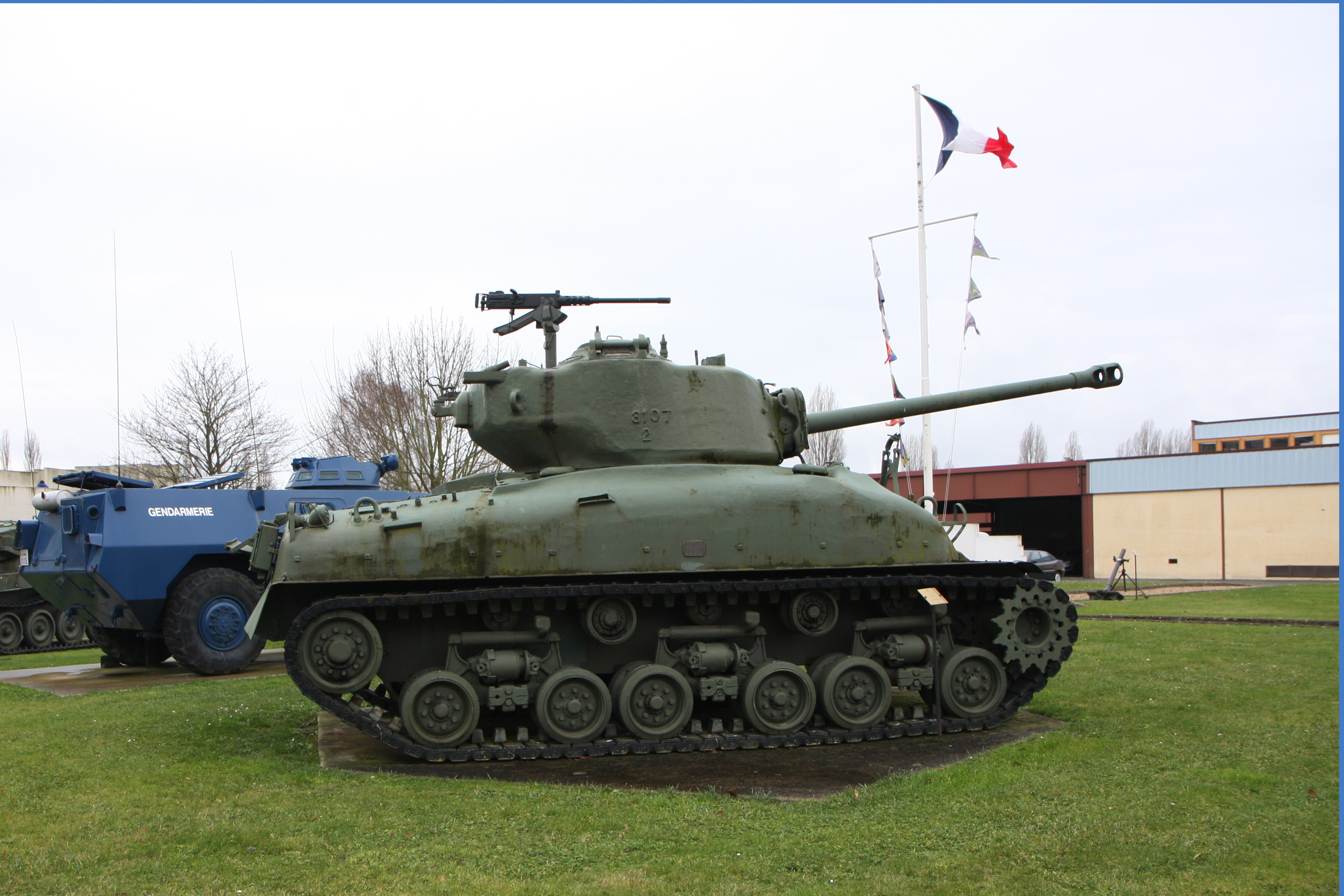
M4 Sherman tank and a VXB-170 Berliet at Satory Camp, station of the Armoured Grouping of the Mobile Gendarmerie

The first armoured unit of the National Gendarmerie was formed in 1933, in Satory, the special grouping of Mobile Republican guard. This special grouping took part in the Battle of France, among the 3rd Armoured Division as the 45th Tank Bataillon.

Other units were formed after World War II, equipped with various vehicles such as the M4 Sherman, M3 Stuart or M24 Chaffee, with the purpose of being used in case of a war.

Following the fall of the Berlin Wall and the end of the Cold War, most of these squadrons were disbanded in the 1990s, except the grouping of Satory which has centralized all the armoured squadrons of the Gendarmerie, named the Armoured Grouping of the Mobile Gendamerie.

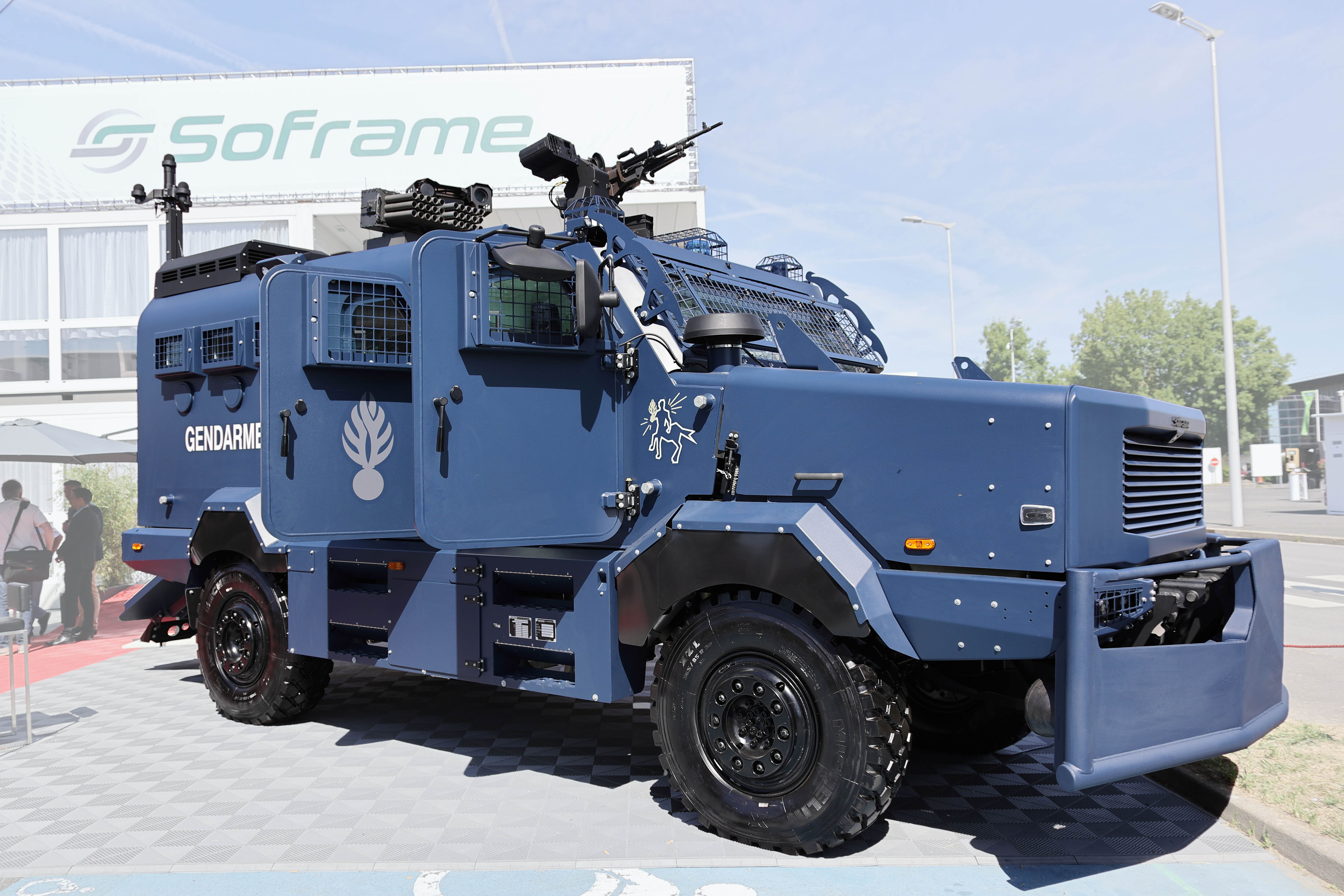
Multipurpose gendarmerie intervention vehicle

The Berliet VXB-170 entered into service in 1974, in Satory squadrons as well as in other units, located throughout French territory. 155 were received.

In 2023, the multipurpose gendarmerie intervention vehicle, nicknamed Centaur, is the new main combat system of the Versailles Armoured Grouping.

Armoured units and their equipment were used in overseas operations such as the Opération Licorne, the European Union Monitoring Mission in Georgia and Afghanistan. Some operations were conducted with different armoured vehicles provided by the French Army.

=== Helicopters ===
The Gendarmerie has used helicopters since 1954. They are part of the Gendarmerie air forces (Forces aériennes de la Gendarmerie or FAG—not to be confused with the Air Gendarmerie or the Air Transport Gendarmerie). FAG units are attached to each of the seven domestic "zonal" regions and six overseas COMGEND (Gendarmerie commands). They also operate for the benefit of the National Police which owns no helicopters (the Police also has access to Civil Security helicopters).

As of 2014, Gendarmerie air forces (FAG) operate a fleet of 56 machines belonging to three types and specialized in two basic missions: surveillance/intervention and rescue/intervention.

- Eurocopter AS350 Écureuil: 26 machines (surveillance/intervention)
- Eurocopter EC135: 15 machines (surveillance/intervention)
- Eurocopter EC-145: 15 machines (rescue/intervention)

=== Gallery ===
Gendarmerie helicopters

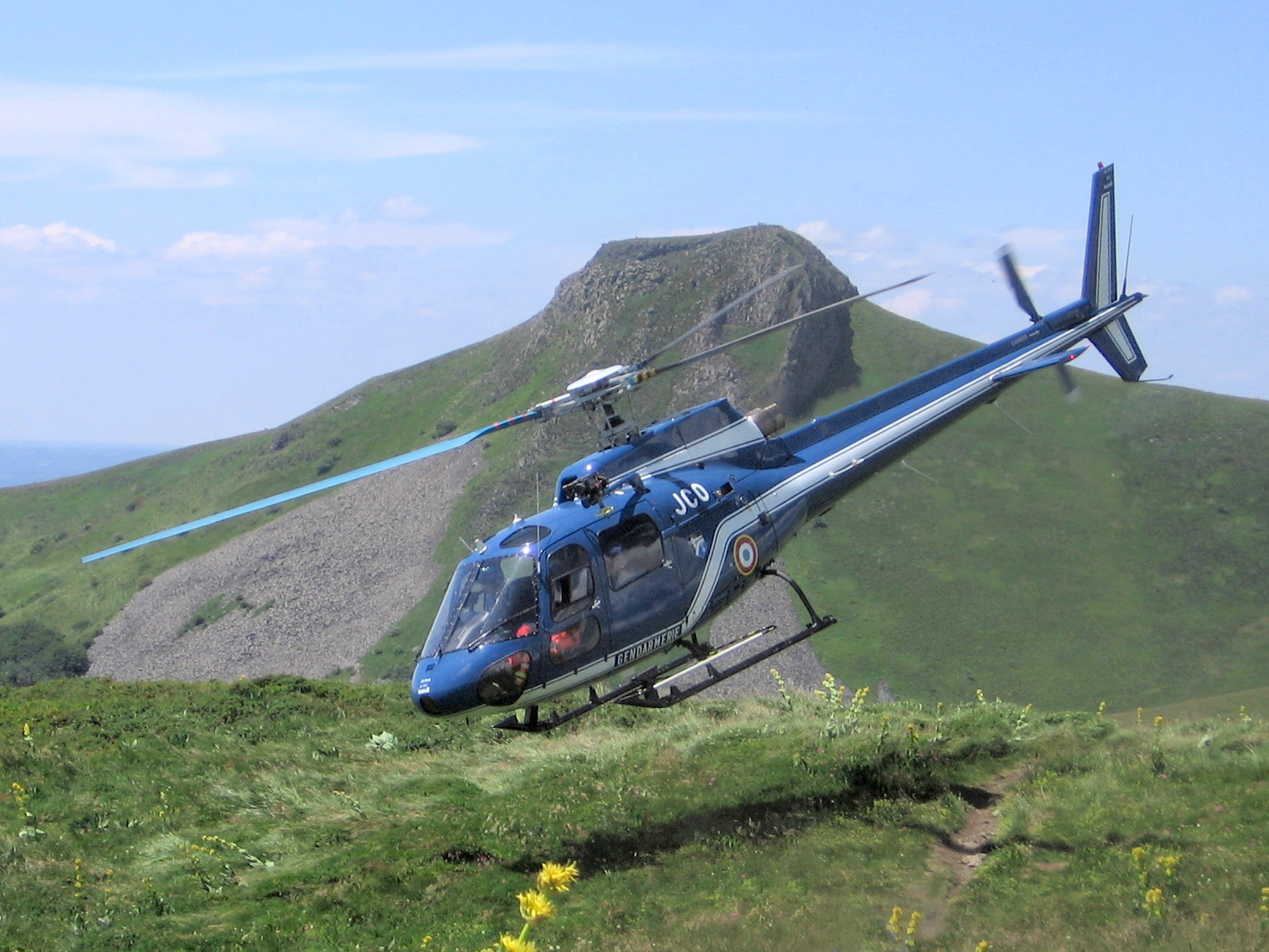
AS350 Écureuil

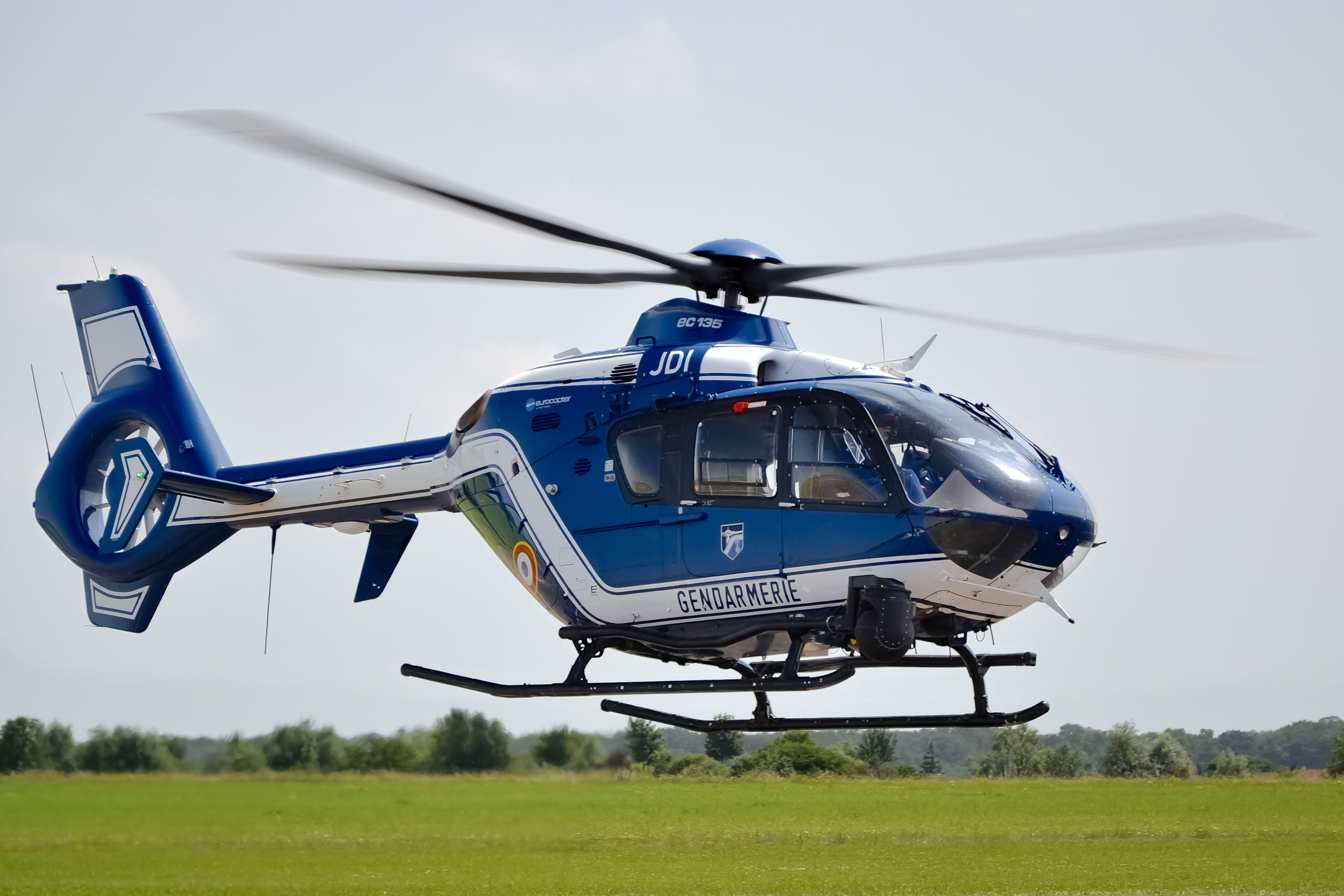
EC-135

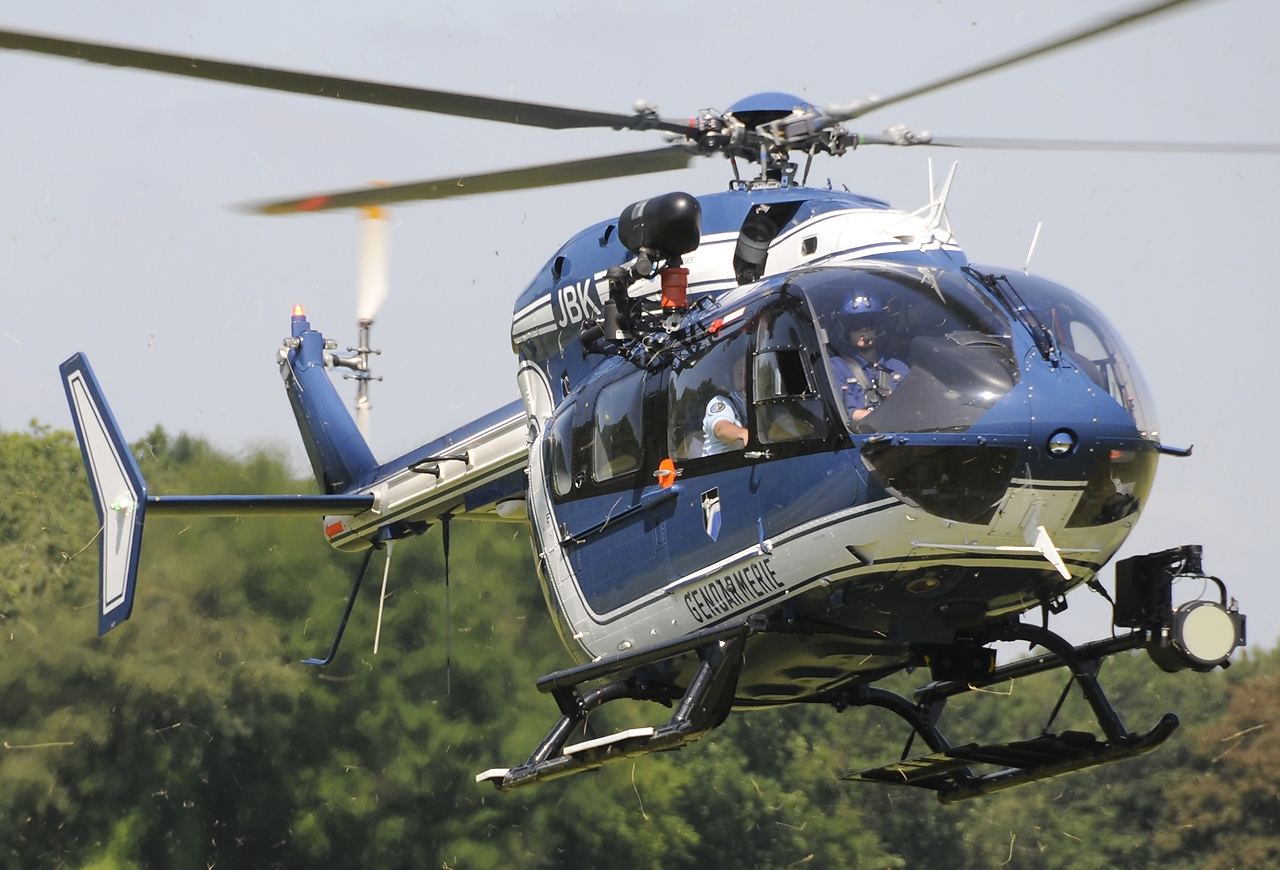
EC-145

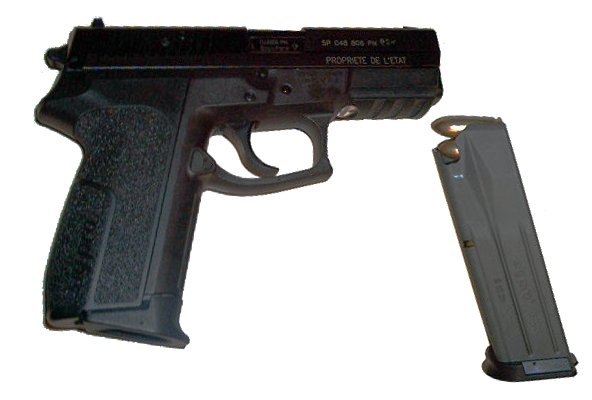
SIG Sauer Pro SP 2022, French service weapon (police, gendarmerie, prison administration and customs) with PROPRIETE DE L'ETAT ("property of the State") engraved on the slide

=== Weapons ===
==== Firearms ====
| Weapon | Origin | Type | Notes |
|---|---|---|---|
| SIG Sauer SP 2022 | Switzerland | Semi-automatic pistol | Standard sidearm |
| PAMAS G1 | France | Semi-automatic pistol | Issued to reservists |
| Glock 17 FR | Austria | Semi-automatic pistol | Issued to specialist units |
| Glock 26 | Austria | Semi-automatic pistol | Issued to the "Section de recherches" |
| Heckler & Koch USP Compact | Germany | Semi-automatic pistol | Issued to the Maritime Gendarmerie |
| Heckler & Koch MP5 | Germany | Submachine gun | Issued to the Mobile Gendarmerie and the Republican Guard |
| Heckler & Koch UMP9 | Germany | Submachine gun | Issued to the Departmental Gendarmerie |
| Heckler & Koch G36 | Germany | Assault rifle | |
| Heckler & Koch HK416 | Germany | Assault rifle | |
| FAMAS | France | Assault rifle | |
| Tikka T3 | Finland | Bolt-action rifle | |
| MAS AANF1 | France | Machine gun | |

==== Less-lethal weapons ====
| Weapon | Origin |
|---|---|
| Flash-Ball | France |
| LBD-40 | France |
| Taser | United States |
| Pepper spray | United States |
| GLI-F4 grenade | France |

== See also ==
- Air France Flight 8969
- Airborne Units of the National Gendarmerie
- Law enforcement in France
- Le Gendarme de Saint-Tropez—cult comedy series
- GendBuntu—the version of the Ubuntu open source operating system developed by the Gendarmerie for their own use
- History of France's military nuclear program
- National Gendarmerie Museum
- Brigades nautiques et fluviales

General

- Police
- Gendarmerie
- International Association of Gendarmeries and Police Forces with Military Status

=== Equivalents ===
- People's Armed Police
- National Guard of Russia
- Gendarmerie General Command
- Carabinieri
- Royal Moroccan Gendarmerie
