= Air and Space Gendarmerie =

Air branch of the French National Gendarmerie

The Air and Space Gendarmerie (French: Gendarmerie de l'Air et de l'Espace) is the unit of the French Gendarmerie protecting the Air bases of the French Air and Space Force and investigating aviation accidents and incidents when a military aircraft is involved, whether it belongs to the Air force or to any other military branches.

It should not be confused with the larger Air Transport Gendarmerie which provides security for civilian airports and deals with civil aviation accidents.

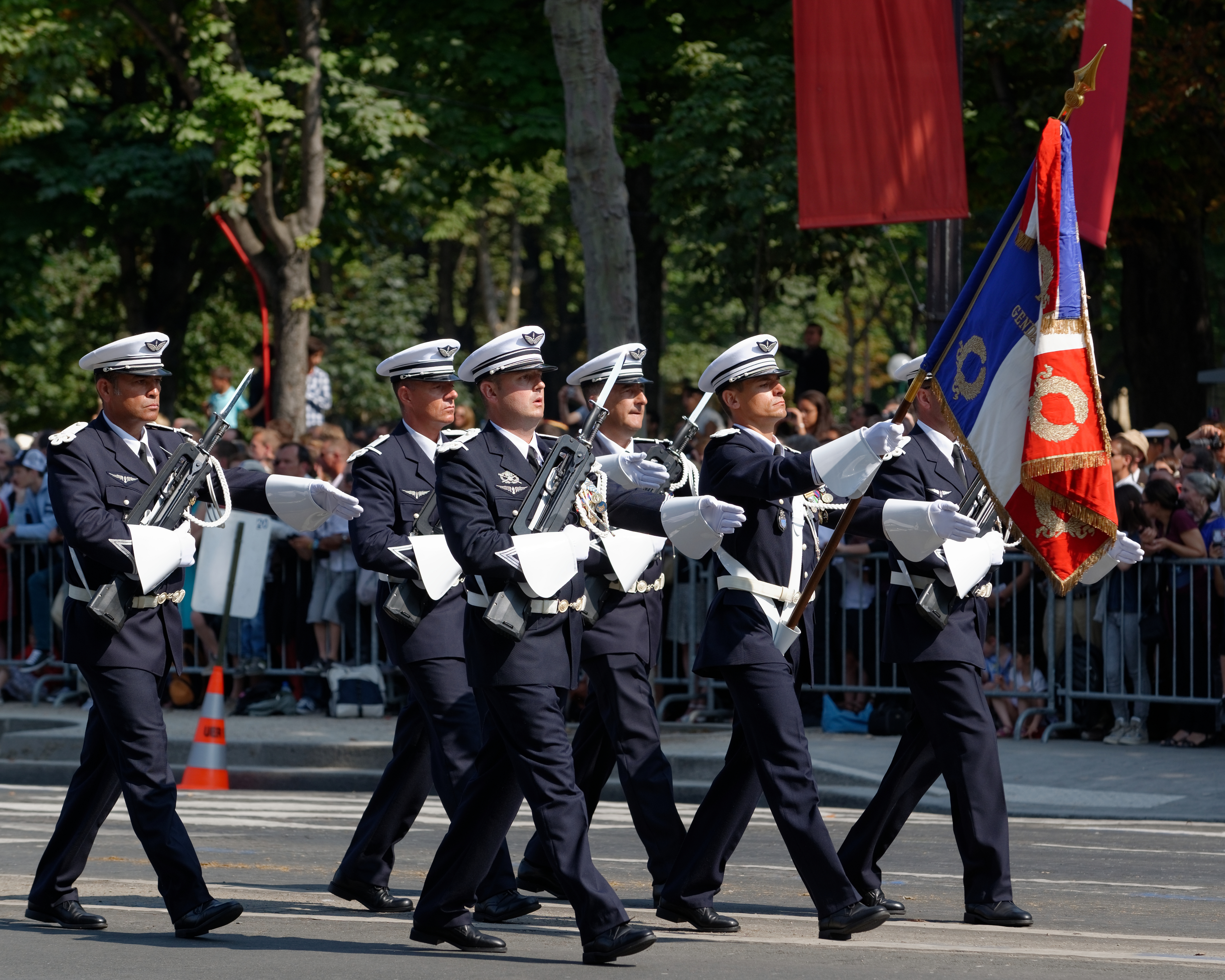

It has a strength of 750 military and is commanded by a colonel or a general.

Arm patch of the Air Gendarmerie.

It is divided into three groupings, North grouping located in the Vélizy – Villacoublay Air Base, South grouping located in the military side of the Bordeaux–Mérignac Airport and the Security and Safety grouping is located in the Hexagone Balard for which it provides law enforcement and protective security services.

Both North and South groupings are divided into several brigades, each attached to an Air base.

The Air and Space Gendarmerie is also deployed on war zones where French Air Force units are engaged. For instance, Air Gendarmes have been deployed on the military part of the International Airport of Kabul.

Air Gendarmes can also serve as Provost (military police) specialized in aviation related enquiries.
