= Air Transport Gendarmerie =

Airport security branch of the French National Gendarmerie

- Gendarmerie des Transports Aériens (French)
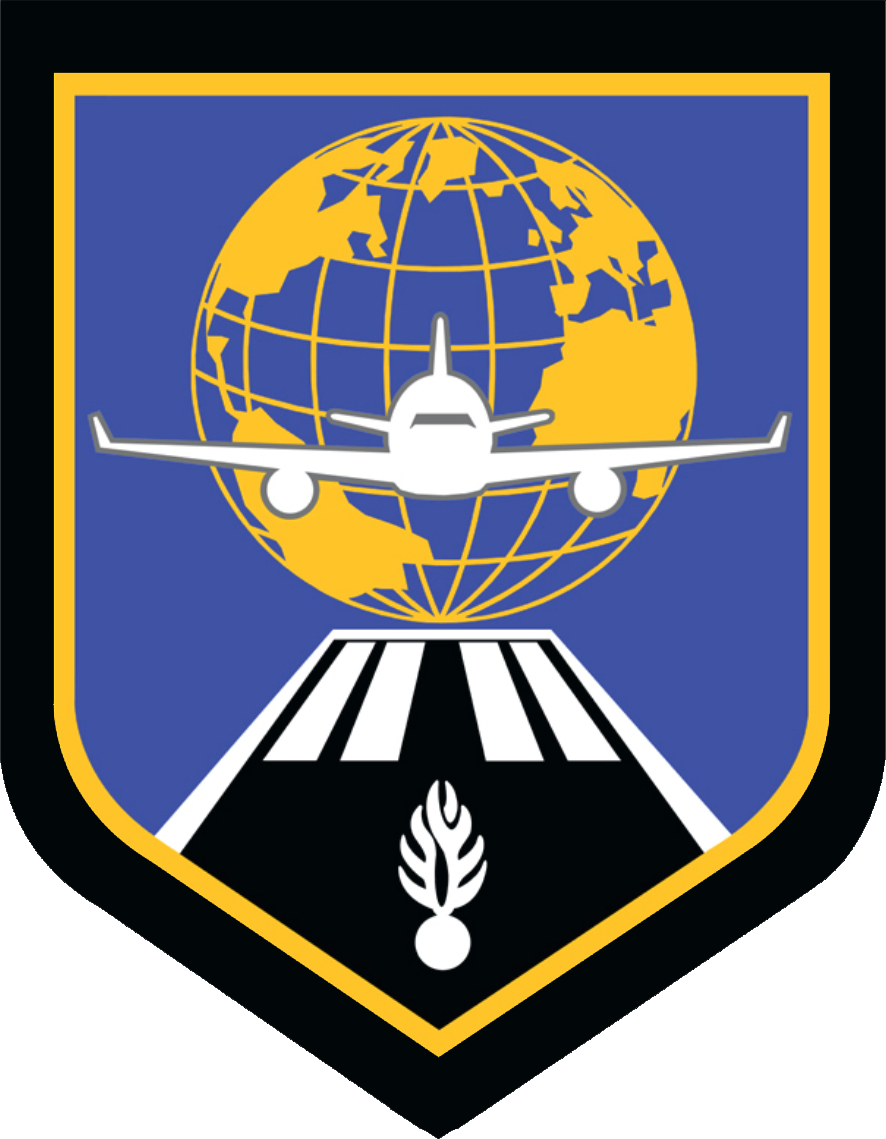
- Arm patch of the Air Transport Gendarmerie
- Active: 1953–present
- Country: France
- Agency: National Gendarmerie
- Role: Airport security
- Part of: Directorate General for Civil Aviation

Structure
- Officers: 1,100

The Air Transport Gendarmerie (French: Gendarmerie des Transports Aériens) (GTA) is a branch of the French Gendarmerie. It is placed under the dual supervision of the Gendarmerie and the Directorate General for Civil Aviation of the Transportation Ministry, and has a strength of about 1,100, commanded by a senior officer or by a general officer.

Its missions are centered on airport security, and it also carries out judicial inquiries pertaining to civilian aviation accidents.

The GTA was created in 1953 out of existing airport gendarmerie specialist units created from 1946.

The Air Transport Gendarmerie should not be confused with the smaller Air Gendarmerie, which provides policing for the French Air Force.

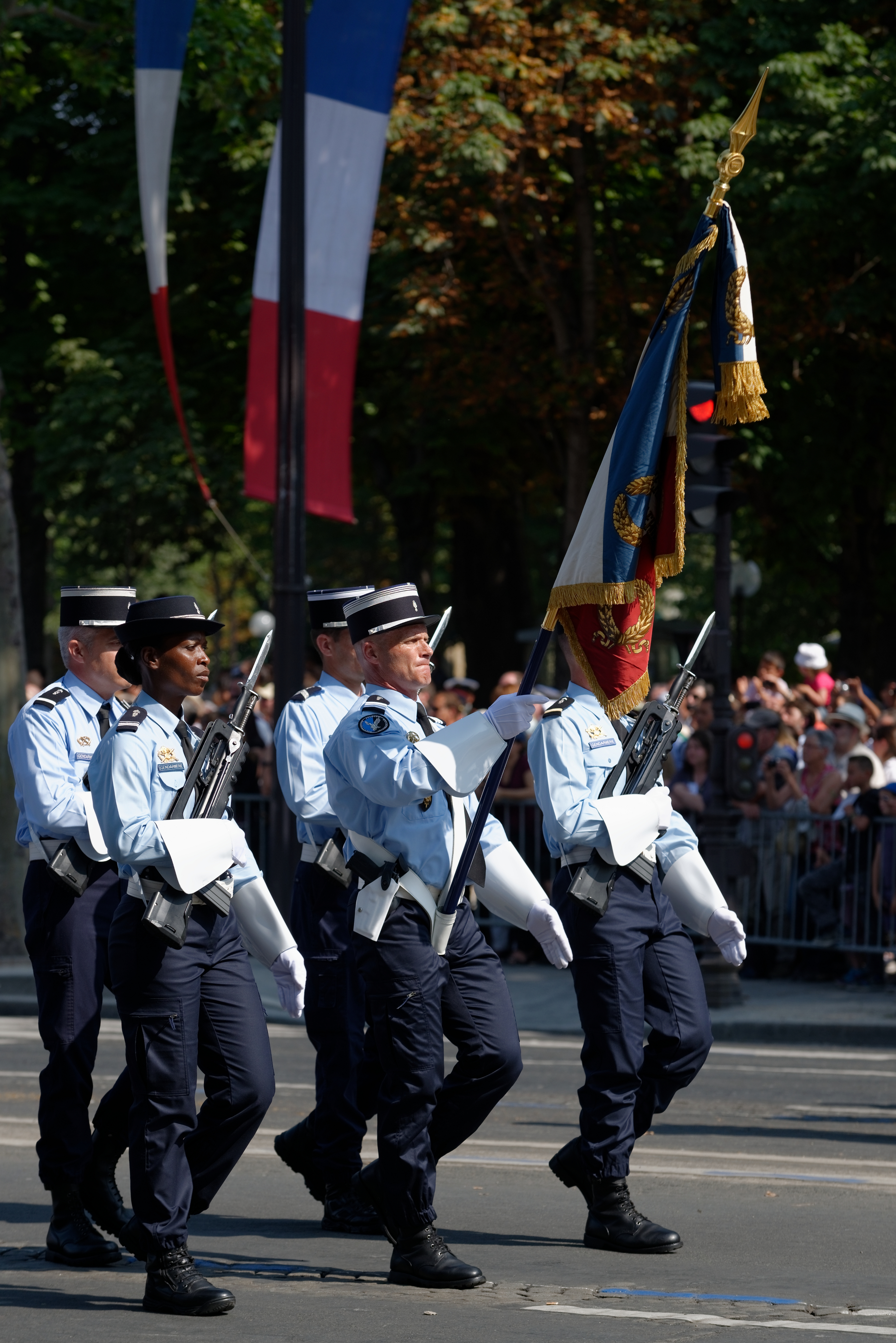
Flag of the Air Transport Gendarmerie during the military parade of the 2013 Bastille Day.

== Missions ==
The GTA's diverse missions include:

- police and security in civilian airfields and airports
- counter-terrorism
- counter-narcotic activities
- freight surveillance
- surveillance of technical installations of the airports (control towers etc.)
- traffic control on the roads within the airports
- protection of important visitors stopping for a layover
- judicial inquiries pertaining to accidents of civilian aircraft

Personnel of the GTA cover a wide range of specialities, including security patrols, freight inspectors, counter-snipers, aviators, dog handlers, auditors, and health inspectors. All personnel follow an initial aviation-related course called Formation Aéronautique de Base. Most personnel receive more specialised training at the École nationale de l'aviation civile.

== Units ==
The GTA headquarters are in Paris. The GTA is divided into two metropolitan groupings and the overseas units. The metropolitan groupings are divided into companies, and both also maintain a Brigade de recherche.

The different companies cover more airports than just the airport in their name. For example the Paris-Orly Company also covers Issy-les-Moulineaux, Beauvais-Tillé, Lille-Lesquin, Toussus-le-Noble & CRNA Nord Athis-Mons, the Strasbourg Company also covers Bâle-Mulhouse, Metz-Nancy-Lorraine et CRNA Est Reims, and the Bordeaux Company also covers Biarritz-Anglet-Bayonne and Pau.

=== Northern Grouping ===
The Northern Grouping (Groupement Nord) is headquartered at Paris-Charles-de-Gaulle airport. It contains the Paris-Charles-de-Gaulle company, the Paris-Orly Company, the Brest Company, and the Strasbourg Company.

=== Southern Grouping ===
The Southern Grouping (Groupement Sud) is headquartered in Aix-en-Provence. It contains the Lyons Company, the Bordeaux Company, the Marseilles Company, the Nice Company, and the Toulouse Company.

=== Overseas Air Transport Gendarmerie ===
Seven small brigades (typically of ten to twelve gendarmes each) cover overseas installations. Together these are known as the "Overseas Air Transport Gendarmerie" ("GTA outre-mer"):

- Brigade de Cayenne-Félix Éboué (Guyane)
- Brigade de Nouméa-La Tontouta (Nouvelle-Calédonie)
- Brigade du Lamentin (Martinique)
- Brigade de Guadeloupe
- Brigade de Saint-Denis (La Réunion)
- Brigade de Tahiti-Faaa (Polynésie française)
- Brigade de Aéroport de Dzaoudzi-Pamandzi (Mayotte)
