= Chef d'escadron =

Service grade

Chef d'Escadron insignia in the Garde Républicaine

In some branches of the French Army and in the French National Gendarmerie Chef d'escadron ("squadron leader") is the officer rank above captain and below lieutenant colonel. It is the first Senior officer (Officier supérieur) rank and corresponds to Major in the armies of most English-speaking countries. It is spelled with an s (Chef d'escadrons) in units which were traditionally part of the cavalry.

The equivalent rank in other branches of the French Army that are not mounted troops (mostly Infantry and Combat Engineers) is Chef de bataillon (battalion leader). In the administrative and support branch of the Gendarmerie, the equivalent rank is Commandant.

In summary :

- Troupes à cheval (horse troops):
  - cavalry, tanks : chef d'escadrons - four silver (white) braids
  - transportation units, artillery : chef d'escadron - four silver (white) braids
  - Gendarmerie : chef d'escadron - four silver (white) braids for the Departmental Gendarmerie, four golden (yellow) braids for the Mobile Gendarmerie and the Republican Guard
- Troupes à pied (foot units) : infantry, combat engineers - chef de bataillon : four golden (yellow) braids
- Gendarmerie administrative Corps : commandant - four silver (white) braids

Chef d'escadron is also in use in the armies of many former French colonies such as Niger),

Somehow confusingly, Chef d'escadron is also a title (not a rank) sometimes used for the commanding officer of a squadron, (usually a capitaine in the Army but either a capitaine or a chef d'escadron in the Gendarmerie).

Finally, the French Air Force also has squadrons but does not use chef d'escadron as a title (and uses commandant as a rank).

== See also ==
Chef d'escadre - the ancien Régime equivalent of rear admiral rank.
