= 1967 Guadeloupe riots =

- (May 67 Massacre); Part of Guadeloupe Independence movement
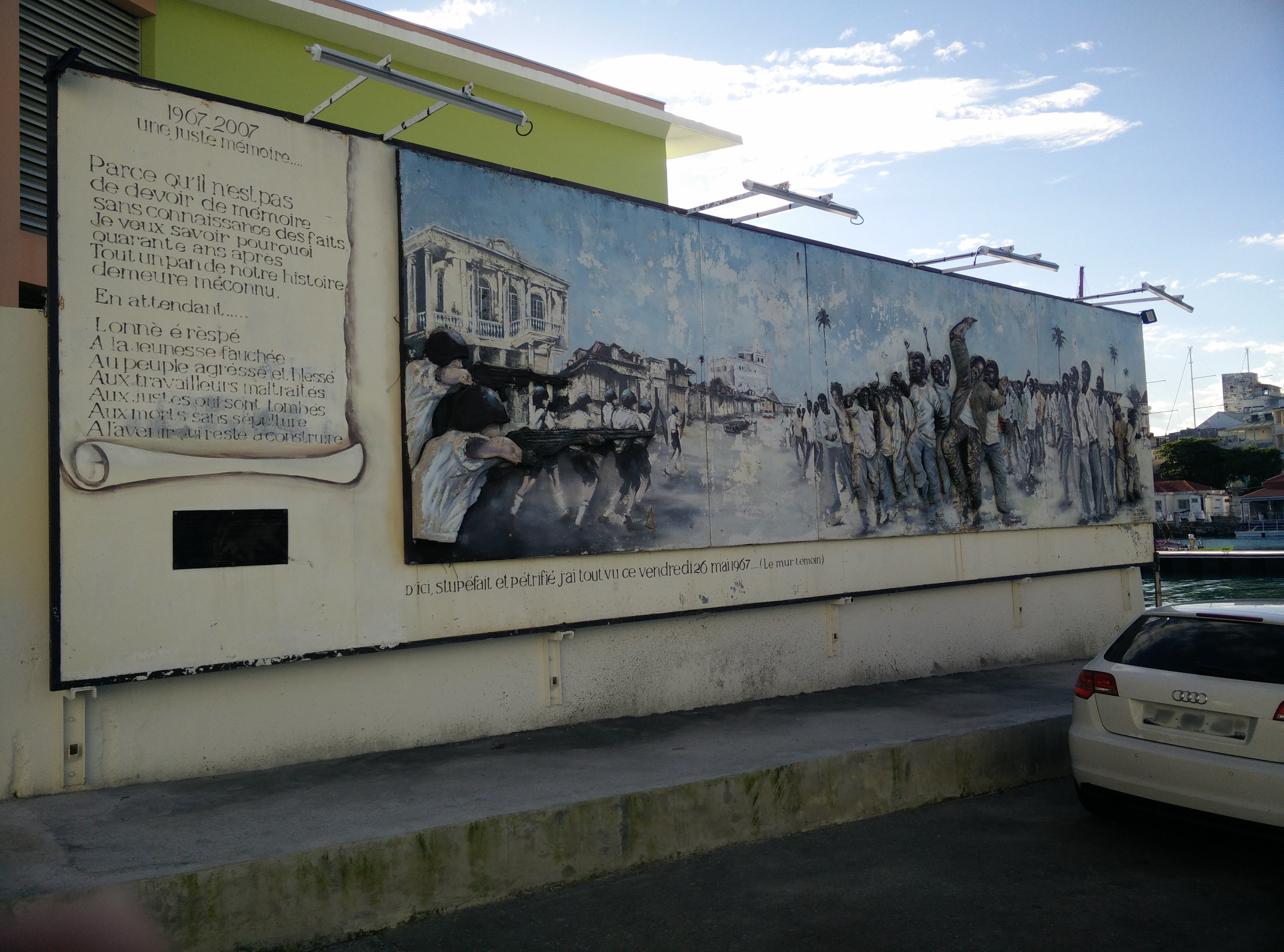
- A mural painted in the remembrance of the victims in Point-à-Pitre
- Date: May 20 – May 28, 1967
- Location: Guadeloupe
- Caused by: Racism, Socio-economic inequalities and Low Wages
- Goals: Increase of Wages, Separatism
- Methods: Riots, Traffic Obstruction and Civil disobedience

Parties
France: Police Nationale; CRS; National Gendarmerie; Mobile Gendarmerie; UNR	Demonstrators: GONG

Lead figures
De Gaulle (Guadeloupe) Pierre Bolotte	Jacques Nestor †

Casualties and losses
30+ wounded	~87–200 killed

The riots of May 1967 in Guadeloupe were clashes which occurred between gendarmes and demonstrators on the island during strikes following a racially motivated attack. The riots resulted in the deaths of 87 people (1985 estimate, 1967 estimate reported 7 deaths). Other sources estimate the number to be between 80 and 200.

== Background ==
Guadeloupe, an island with a number of socio-economic inequalities between the peoples of European and African ancestry significantly increased by the social transformation policies relaunched by the French government to compensate for the damage caused by Hurricane Inez .

Moreover, due to the Decolonisation movements taking place in other parts of the world, similar separatist movements also began to take form in Guadeloupe, such as GONG but the Gaullist movement in France was not willing to negotiate because of the strategic location of the island. So these movements came into direct conflict with the French authorities, police and paramilitaries.

== Timeline ==
On March 20, 1967, Vladimir Snarsky, white owner of a large shoe store in Basse-Terre, unleashes his German Shepherd to chase away Raphaël Balzinc, an old black and disabled shoemaker who set up his stall in front of the store. The white owner, was the local leader of the Gaullist UNR party, ironically asked his dog "Say hello to the nigger!" This racist incident sparked riots and strikes in Basse-Terre and Pointe-à-Pitre. Two squadrons of National Gendarmerie were deployed in Guadeloupe.

On May 24, 1967, construction workers in Guadeloupe went on strike to obtain a 2.5% salary increase and parity in social rights.

On May 26, at noon, a crowd gathered in front of the Pointe-à-Pitre Chamber of Commerce and waited while negotiations took place between union organizations and the employer representatives. Around 12:45 p.m., they learned from a representative that the negotiations had broken down and rumors began to spread.

The employers' representative, Georges Brizzard, reportedly said: " When the Negroes are hungry, they will go back to work!". The Demonstrators started chanting " Djibouti, Djibouti" to recall the violence which had taken place there, with the French Army shooting separatist demonstrators on sight.

The clashes began with tear gas grenades fired by the gendarmes against demonstrators who threw Lambi conch shells, stones and glass bottles. On the morning of May 26, Mobile Gendarmerie opened fire during violent demonstrations by strikers, causing several injuries. When a gendarme took off his helmet to wipe his forehead, he received a violent blow to his head severely injuring him, the Mobile Gendarmerie open fire in retaliation, causing the death of Jacques Nestor, a prominent activist of the Guadeloupe National Organization Group. . According to the authorities, the firefight was initiated by demonstrators who opened fire first.

The French authorities initially believed the insurrection to be fomented by the GONG but investigations revealed the riots to be spontaneous.

Some sources state that the opening of fire on demonstrators was knowingly approved by the French government.

== Casualties ==
=== Demonstrators ===
The official toll from the authorities at the time of the massacre was 7 to 8 dead. In 1985, the Secretary of State for the French Overseas Territories, Georges Lemoine, confirmed the death toll of at least 87 victims, cross-checked from several administrative sources, including the General Intelligence. Most estimates put the death toll between 80 and 200, exact death toll was difficult to determine due to the destruction of archives. MP Christiane Taubira put the death toll around one hundred.

=== Law enforcement ===
More than 30 Gendarmes (some red kepis 'Mobile Gendarmerie") and members of the Republican Security Companies were reportedly injured by the demonstrators

== Commemorations ==
A mural was painted in remembrance of the victims on May 26, 2007 in Pointe-à-Pitre.

Commemorations of the victims were held in 2017, demanding the opening of classified archives.

== In popular culture ==
=== In Music ===
- Biloute, a song by Mé swasannsèt, album Rékòlt, 2010

=== Bibliographies ===
- Jacques Le Cornec, A West Indian kingdom: of stories and dreams and mixed peoples, L'Harmattan, 2005
- Raymond Gama and Jean Pierre Sainton, Mé 67, Guadeloupean publishing and distribution company, 1985
- Jean Plumasseau, In the name of the fatherland, Éditions Nestor, 2012
- Raymond Gama (2011). Éd. Lespwisavann (ed.). Mé 67:mémoire d'un événement (in French). Port-Louis. ISBN 978-2-9527540-4-0. OCLC 779736808.

=== Television documentaries ===
- "May 1967 in Guadeloupe, investigation into a forgotten massacre" on January 15, 2014 in 50 years of news stories on 13th street and on Planète+ Justice .
- "May 1967, Police repression in Guadeloupe" broadcast by Fabrice Desplan, France Ô .
- "May 67 – Don't shoot the children of the republic" by Mike Horn, 2017, France Ô .
- "The debate: May 67, the legacy of a revolt". Historical magazine presented by Fabrice d'Almeida in Histoire d'Outre-Mer, France Ô (broadcast on 01/31/2018)

=== Audio documentaries ===
- Rendez with avec X, par Patrick Pesnot on France Inter, 7 March 2009: « May 1967 : The massacre at Pointe-à-Pitre.
- Sensitive affairs, by Fabrice Drouelle on France Inter, broadcast on Thursday April 28, 2016: "When the blacks are hungry, they will return to work" Guadeloupe, May 67, a bloody repression.

=== Internet Documentaries ===
- "Diable Positif: The massacre of May 67", posted online on May 10, 2020.
- "Racisme d'Etat : "Le déni est bien construit" - Par La rédaction | Arrêt sur images". www.arretsurimages.net.

=== Press articles ===
- "50 years ago, the Guadeloupean demonstrations ended in massacre", on Slate.
- "From the forgotten massacres of May 1967 in Guadeloupe to the beginnings of the modern security order in the neighborhoods", on Bastamag.

=== Novels ===
- May 67, by Thomas Cantaloube (Gallimard, the Black Series, 2023) (in French)
- Where dogs bark by their tails, by Estelle-Sarah Bulle (Liana Levi, 2018) (in French)
