= Timeline of strikes in 1967 =

Strikes in 1967

In 1967, a number of labour strikes, labour disputes, and other industrial actions occurred.

== Background ==
A labour strike is a work stoppage caused by the mass refusal of employees to work. This can include wildcat strikes, which are done without union authorisation, and slowdown strikes, where workers reduce their productivity while still carrying out minimal working duties. It is usually a response to employee grievances, such as low pay or poor working conditions. Strikes can also occur to demonstrate solidarity with workers in other workplaces or pressure governments to change policies.

== Timeline ==
=== Continuing strikes from 1966 ===
- 1966–67 Dassault Aviation strike
- Delano grape strike
- 1966–67 Irish farmers' protests, led by the Irish Farmers' Association.
- St. John's University strike of 1966–1967
- 1966–67 Toledo newspaper strike
- Wave Hill walk-off

=== January ===
- 1967 New York gravediggers' strike

=== February ===
- 1967 Malaysian teachers' strike
- 1967 Rhodiacéta strike
- 1967 Singapore cleaners' strike

=== March ===
- 1967 AFTRA Strike
- 1967 Greek healthcare strike

=== May ===
- 1967 Guadeloupe riots
- 1967 Hong Kong riots
- 1967 New Zealand rail strike

=== June ===
- Arab Police mutiny, part of the Aden Emergency.
- 1967 Bombay port strike

=== July ===
- 1967 Sri Lankan postal strike

=== August ===
- 1967 Sydney newspaper strike

=== September ===
- 1967 Ford USA strike, in the United States.

=== October ===
- Liverpool docks strikes

=== December ===
- 1967–68 Asheville rent strike

== Changes in legislation ==
In March, the Parliament of Singapore passes the Criminal Law (Temporary Provisions) (Amendment) Bill 1967, banning strikes in the water, electric, and gas sectors.
