= Compagnies Républicaines de Sécurité =

French riot police

Coordinates: 48.8925°N 2.2775°E

Republican Security Companies Compagnies républicaines de sécurité
- CRS patch
- Abbreviation: CRS
- Motto: Servir; To serve

Agency overview
- Formed: 1944
- Employees: 11,164 (2022)

Jurisdictional structure
- Operations jurisdiction: France
- General nature: Civilian police
- Specialist jurisdiction: Paramilitary law enforcement, counter insurgency, riot control

Website
- www.police-nationale.interieur.gouv.fr/Organisation/Direction-Centrale-des-Compagnies-Republicaines-de-Securite

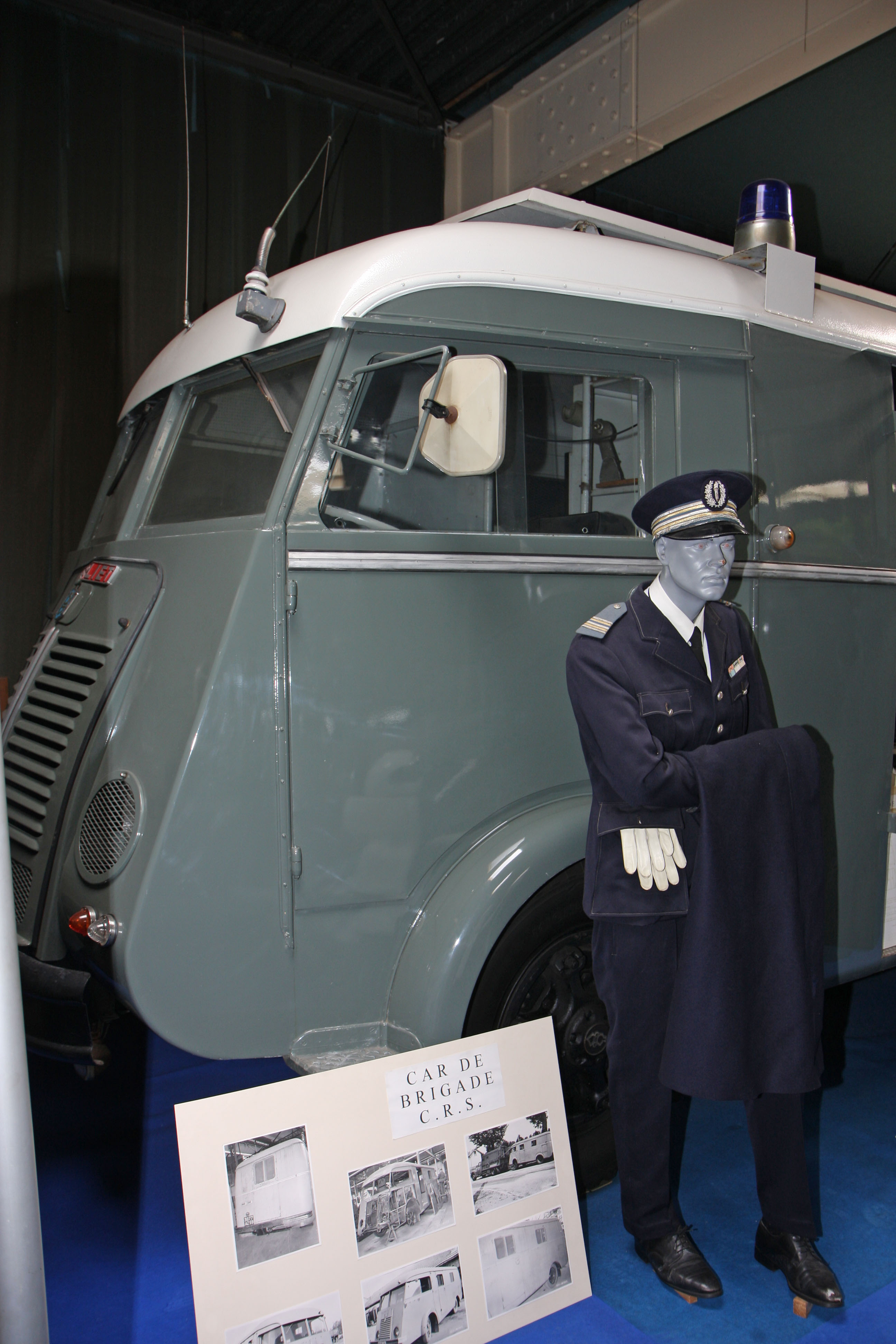
CRS van 1950s - CRS Museum

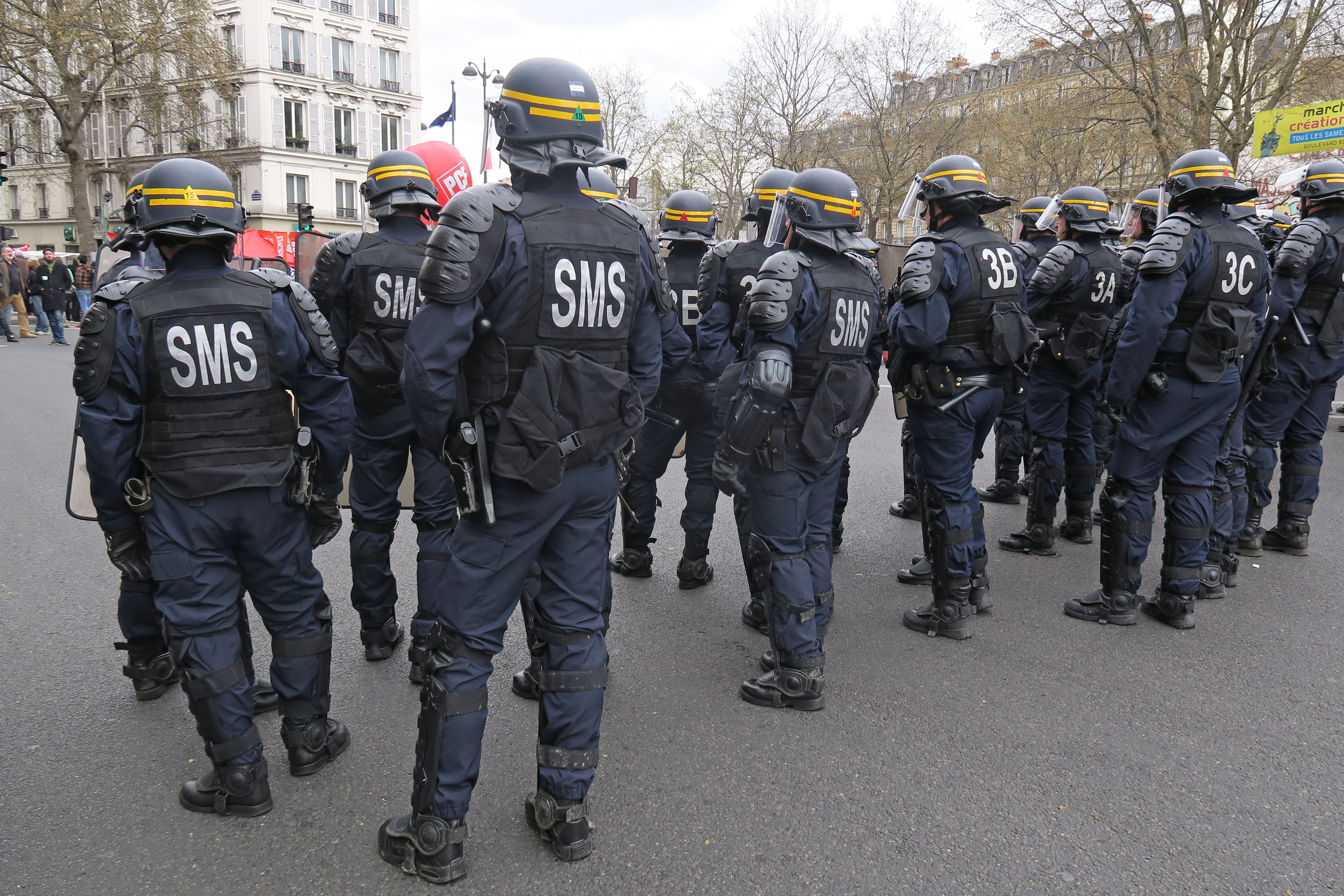
CRS officers during a demonstration in 2016

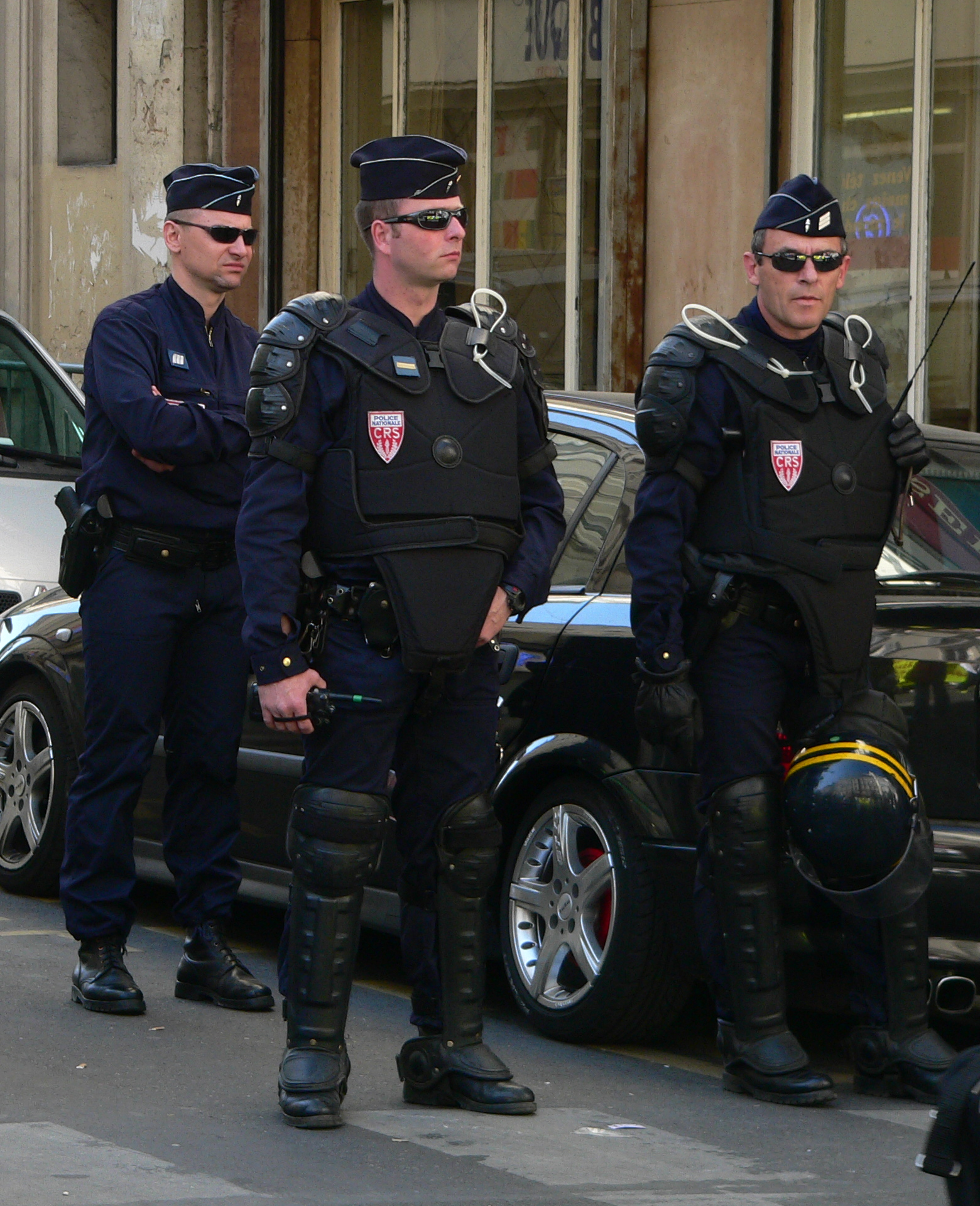
CRS in riot control gear

The Compagnies républicaines de sécurité (CRS; French: [kɔ̃paɲi ʁepyblikɛn də sekyʁite] lit. 'Republican Security Companies') are the general reserve of the French National Police. They are primarily involved in general security missions, but the task for which they are best known is crowd and riot control. The CRS has seven units: in Paris, Lille, Rennes, Bordeaux, Marseille, Lyon and Metz.

There are 60 "general service" CRS companies, specialized in public order and crowd control; nine "motorway" companies (French: Compagnies autoroutières) specialized in highway patrol in urban areas; and six "zonal" motorcycle units (one per defense zone (Note: There are seven metropolitan defense zones, but there is no zonal unit for the Paris region)). Two additional companies and several mountain detachments administratively attached to local companies specialize in Mountain Rescue. One company (CRS n°1) specializes in VIP escort. The National Police band is also a CRS unit.

Some of the CRS officers from the "general service" companies are cross trained and serve as lifeguards on the beaches during the summer vacations.

The expression "les CRS" refers to the whole force. The feminine singular "une CRS" means a company (the noun compagnie is feminine), but the masculine singular "un CRS" is often used to mean "a CRS man"; the press and laypeople frequently use "CRS" to mean any policeman in riot gear and wearing a helmet, whether he is a true CRS or a policeman or a gendarme mobile. The form "trois CRS" in theory means three companies, but is often used to mean three men.

== History ==
The CRS were created on 8 December 1944, after the Groupes mobiles de réserve (GMR) (created by the Vichy régime) were dissolved. The CRS are a civilian corps (unlike the gendarmes, who are military), trained in anti-insurrection and antiriot techniques. The CRS saw their first serious action during the 1947 strikes in France.

Communist sympathisers were strongly represented in the ranks of some of the early companies (due to their history of engagement in the French Resistance, and according to some - due to a desire to practice entryism). The French Communist Party (PCF) took on the role of opposition to postwar governments. On 12 November 1947, there was a demonstration in Marseilles called by the communist union CGT and the French Communist Party; some of the local CRS (a majority of whom were communists at the time), refused to act against it and several companies were dissolved as a consequence while a few more were reorganized in 1948 to remove communist influence from their ranks.

CRS detachments were created in some of the French overseas territories in 1950. The Guadeloupe and Réunion detachments were transformed into companies during the early 1960s but these were disestablished in the 1990s. (Note: CRS companies were frequently deployed as reinforcement to the overseas departments and territories until the 1990s but this practice has been discontinued and only mobile gendarmerie units are sent overseas - or abroad - nowadays.) Up to sixteen additional companies were created in Algeria during the Algerian War of Independence and disestablished at the end of the conflict.

CRS equipment and organization have evolved in phases. A major change in equipment followed the May 1968 demonstrations. During the 1990s, the equipment continued to evolve and the CRS were re-equipped with smaller vans to better adapt the companies to the urban environment (both in their surveillance and riot control missions).

== Missions ==
The "general service" companies, together with the mobile gendarmerie, constitute a highly mobile reserve force for the government. (Note: The generic term used by the French administration to describe both CRS and the mobile gendarmerie squadrons is "Unités de forces mobiles" (English: Mobile forces units).) Their missions include:

- Providing security during large public events and mass gatherings such as ceremonies, sport events, festivals, concerts, and demonstrations
- Patrolling and securing specific areas (borders, suburban areas)
- Maintaining law and order during demonstrations, riot control
- Reinforcing local police forces in their general security missions

== Organization ==
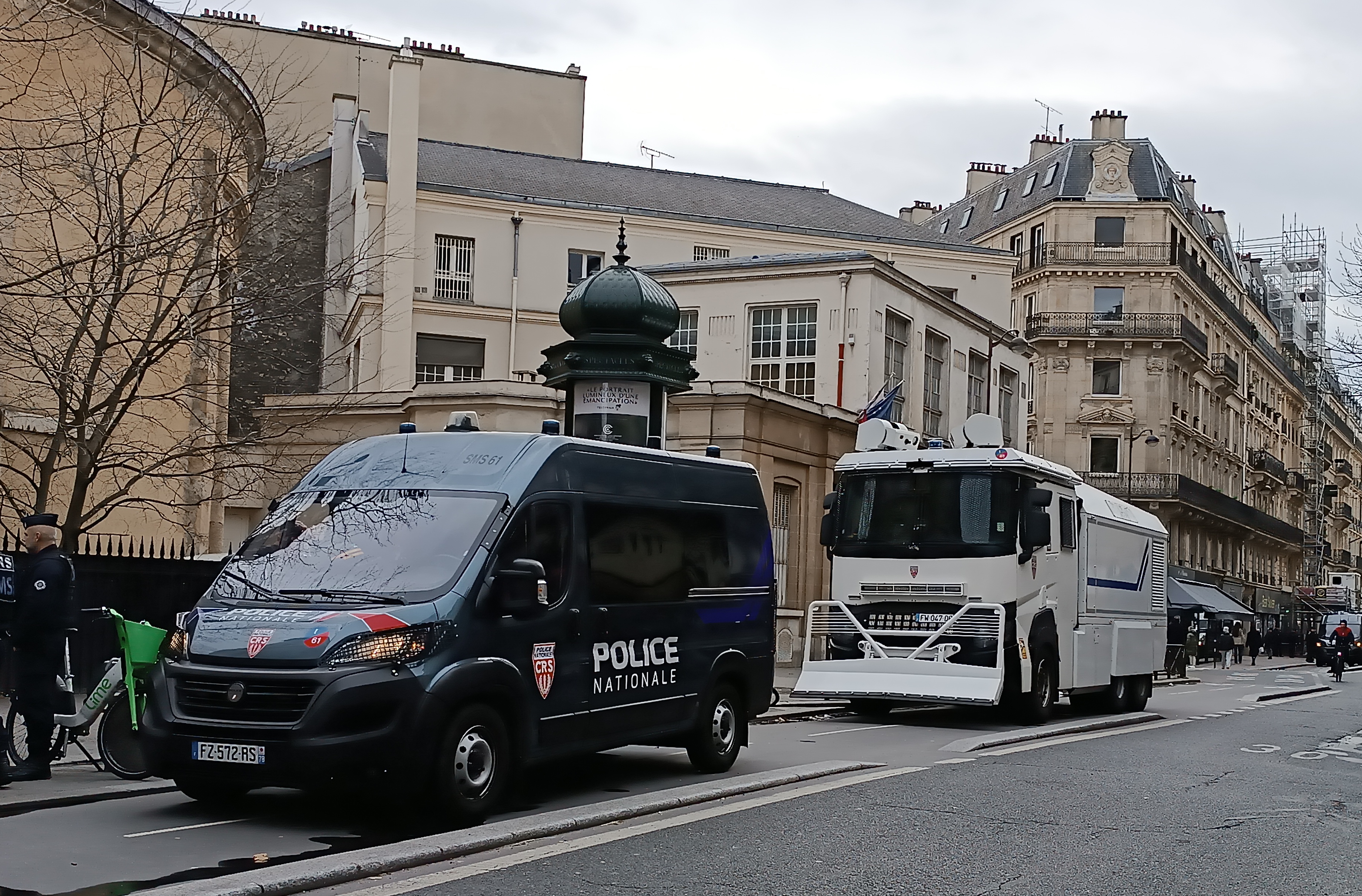
CRS van and water cannon - 2023

- 1 Central Directorate under a Director-general of the National Police in Paris
- 7 Zonal Directorates (one for each metropolitan military defence zone)
- 60 "General Service" Companies (for the maintenance of public order)
- 1 VIP Escort Company (CRS n° 1)
- 9 Autoroute Companies (dedicated to Highway Patrol)
- 6 Zonal Motorcycle Units
- 2 Mountain Companies (Alpes and Pyrenees) - specialized in Mountain Rescue
- The National Police Band (attached to CRS n° 1)

Some of the CRS officers are cross trained and serve as lifeguards during the summer season. They also enforce applicable laws on the beaches.

The CRS are based in barracks but, unlike the gendarmes, they live at home when not on the road. A company typically spends more than 200 days per year away from its base town.

== Company composition ==
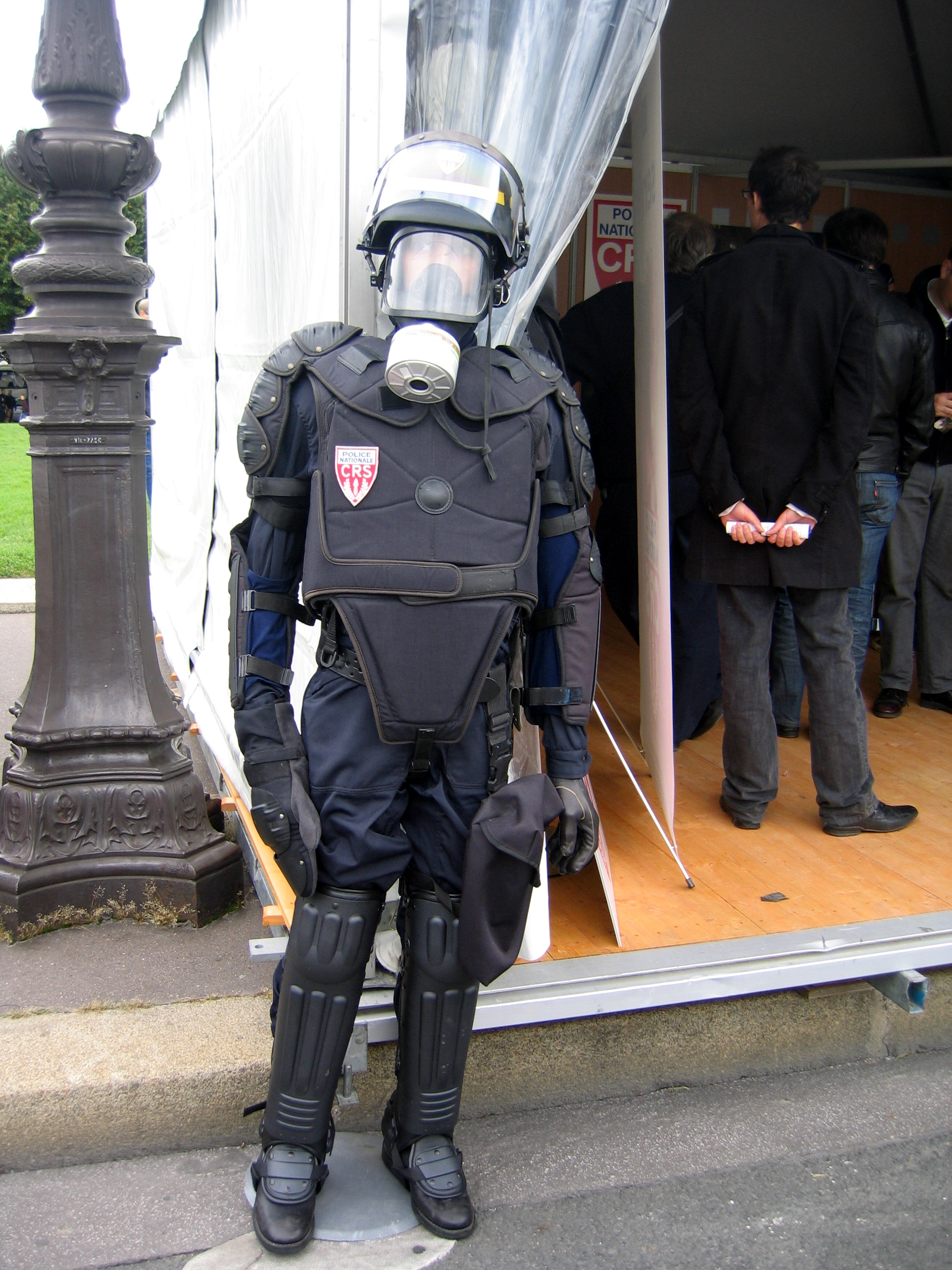
CRS equipment

Most of the "general service" companies have a headquarters platoon and four line platoons (French: sections) each, a few companies having a sixth platoon (French: section des moyens spéciaux) or SMS equipped with special crowd/riot control equipment such as water cannons).

A complement of a regular company is as follows:

- 1 Company commander with the rank of Police Commandant (Major).
- 1 Police Captain
- 2 Police Lieutenants
- 1–4 Brigadiers-Major
- 12–25 Brigadiers-Chief
- 100–120 officers
CRS vehicles

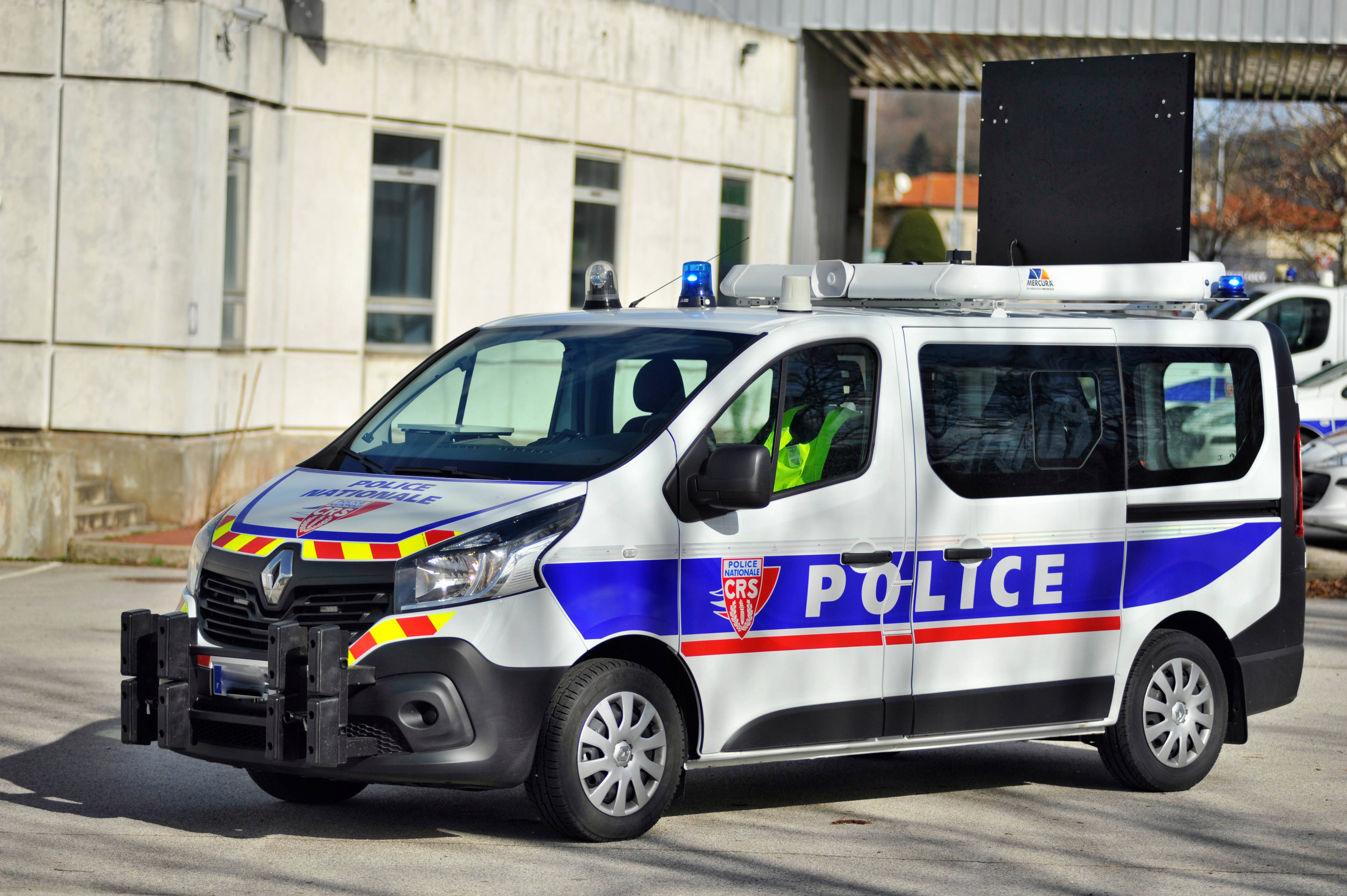
Van of a motorway company

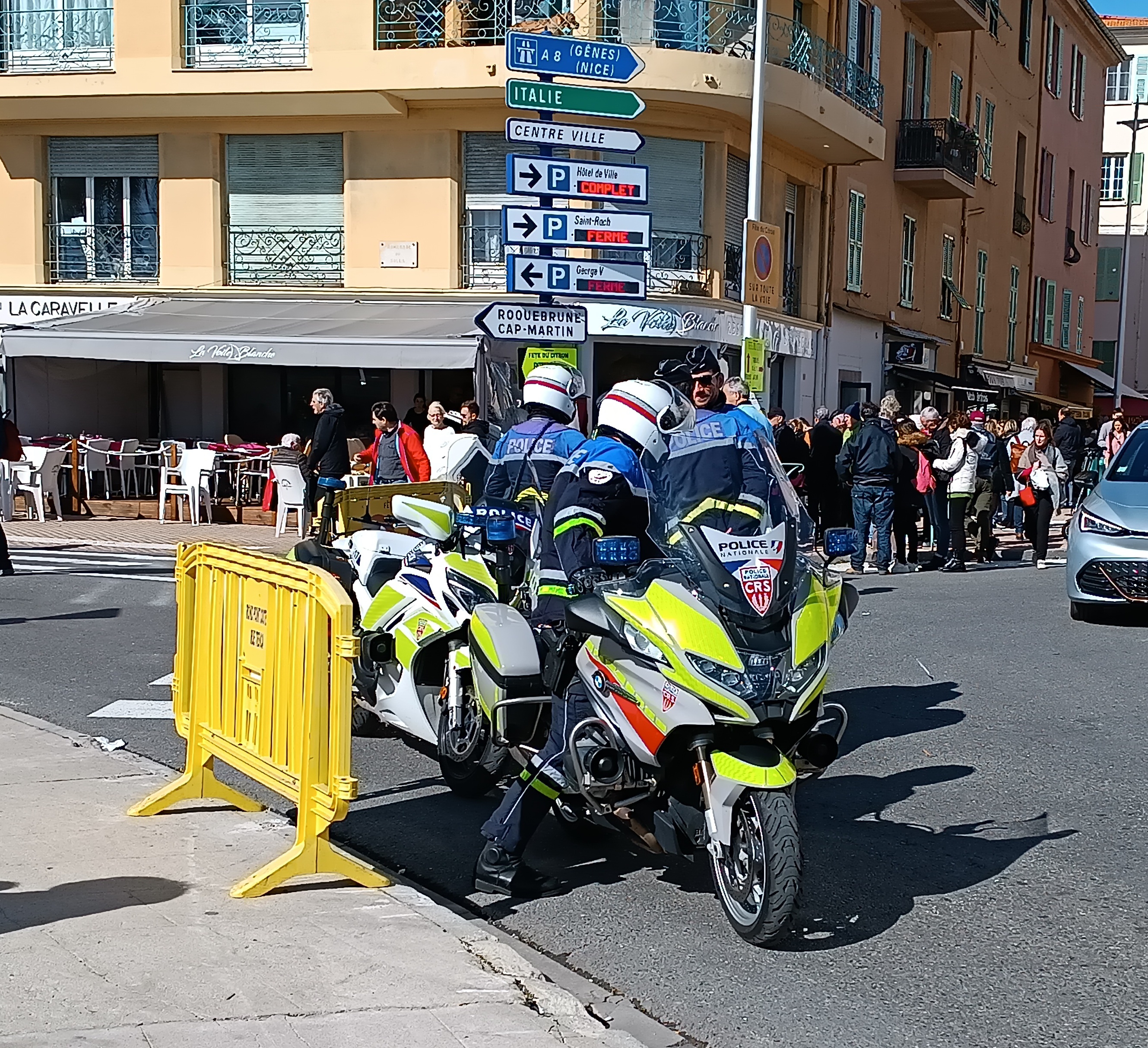
CRS motorcyclists

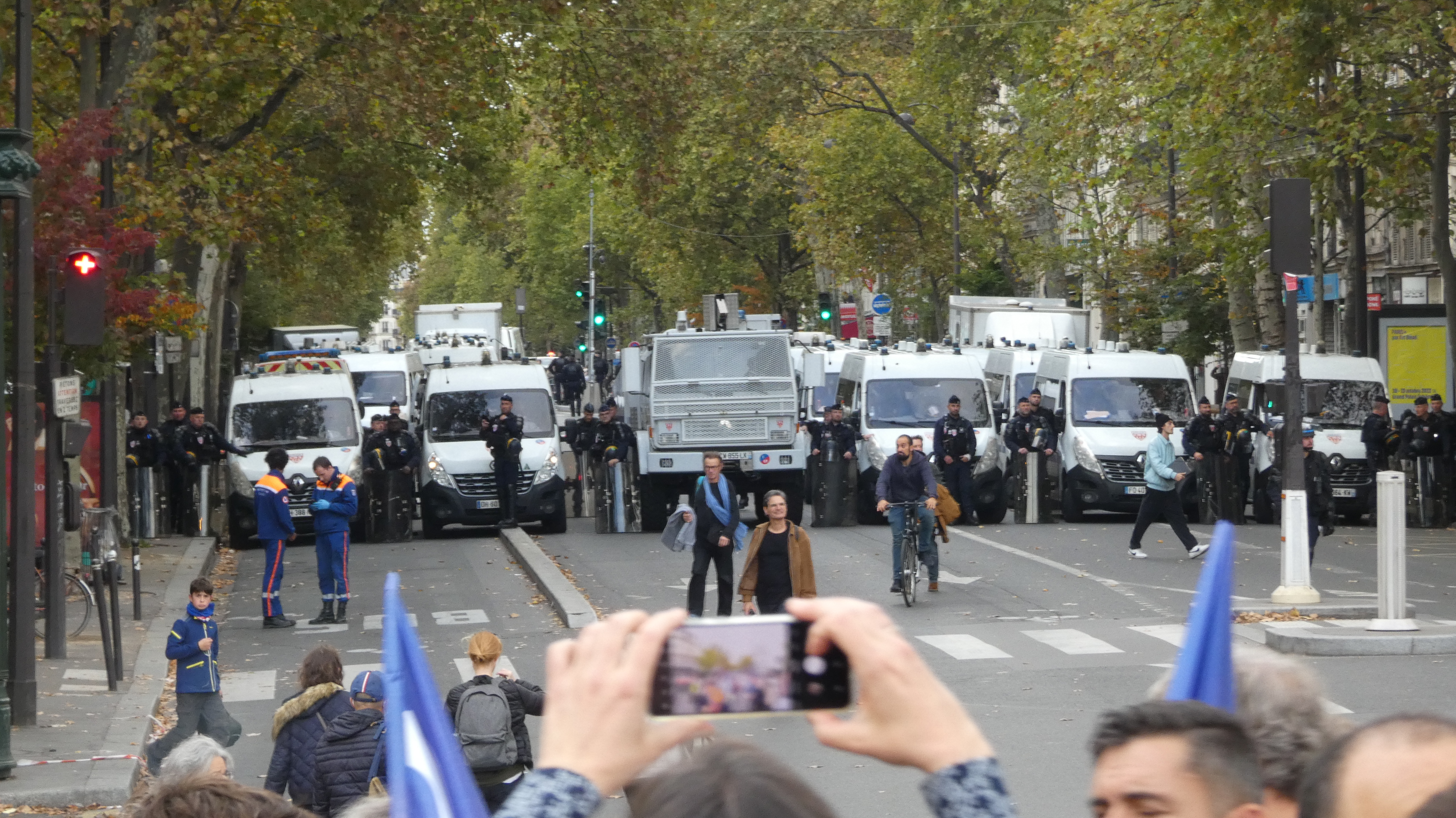
CRS vans and water cannon truck during a demonstration - 2022

== Criticism ==
The suppressive role and occasional abuse of force by the CRS towards protesters or even school children has led to criticisms among human rights supporters. There have also been a number of complaints against CRS officers on the subject of racism and racial profiling.

== Similar forces ==
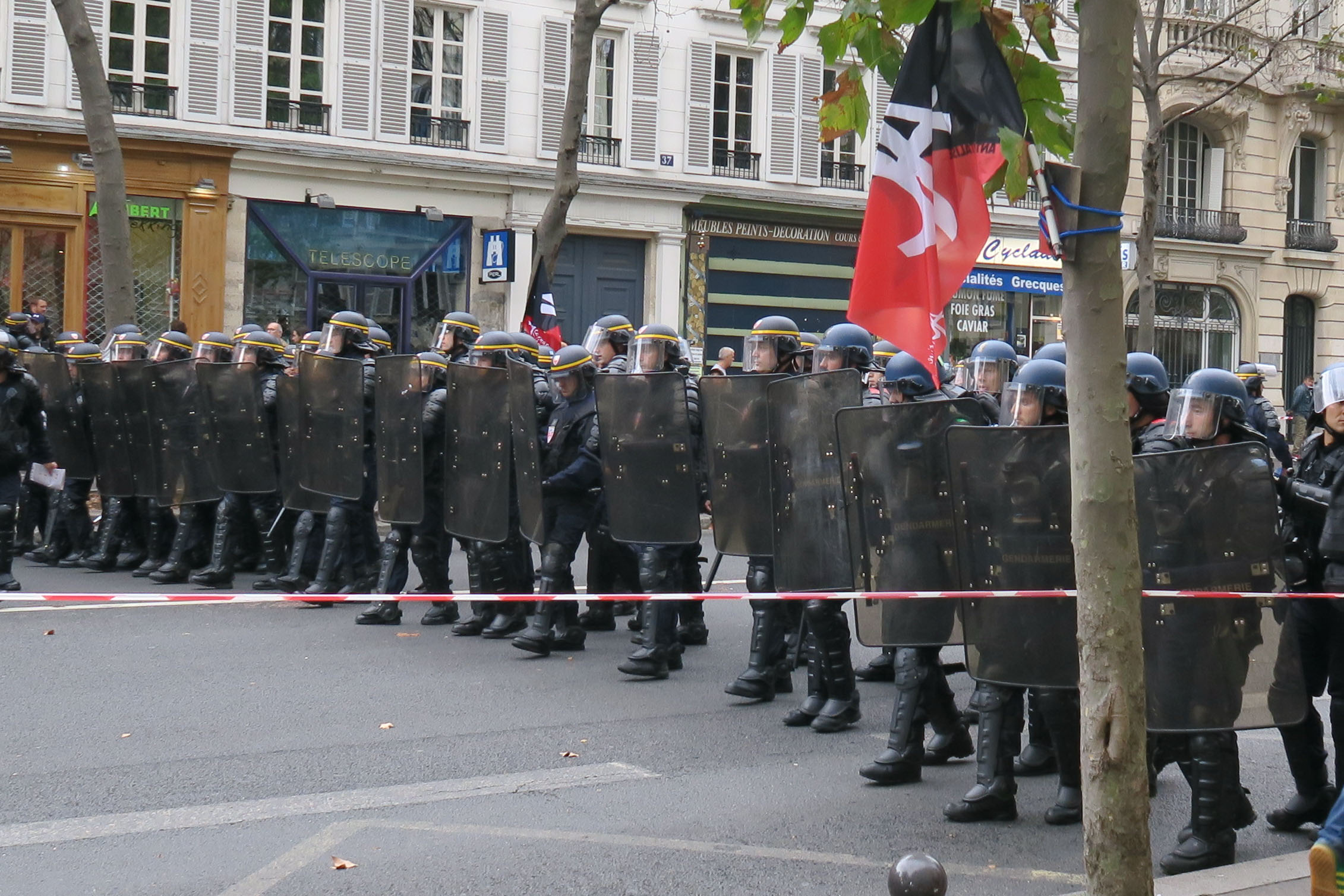
CRS (left) and gendarmes mobiles (right)

As French anti-riot forces, the CRS and the Gendarmerie Mobile are often mistaken for each other. The CRS are usually not deployed to the overseas French territories. The gendarmes, being part of the armed forces, can be deployed on foreign theaters. For example, gendarmerie mobile squadrons were deployed in Afghanistan, Kosovo and the Ivory Coast.

The two forces can be distinguished by uniform: uniform of the CRS is blue while that of the gendarmes mobiles is black. The CRS wear a big red CRS patch and their helmets sport yellow bands; the gendarmes have a stylized grenade on their medium-blue helmets.

In January 2009, the French state implemented a rapprochement ("bringing together") of the police and the gendarmerie. This policy falls short of a complete merger, as the gendarmes have kept their military status while the CRS are a highly unionized civilian body; rapprochement has led to more commonality in terms of equipment for the two forces.

== Bibliography ==
- Robert Le Texier, Les Compagnies Républicaines de Sécurité, éditions Lavauzelle, Paris-Limoges, 1981.
- Jean-Louis Courtois, CRS au service de la nation, C/O Crepin-Leblond, novembre 2004.
