= Departmental Gendarmerie =

Territorial police branch of the French National Gendarmerie

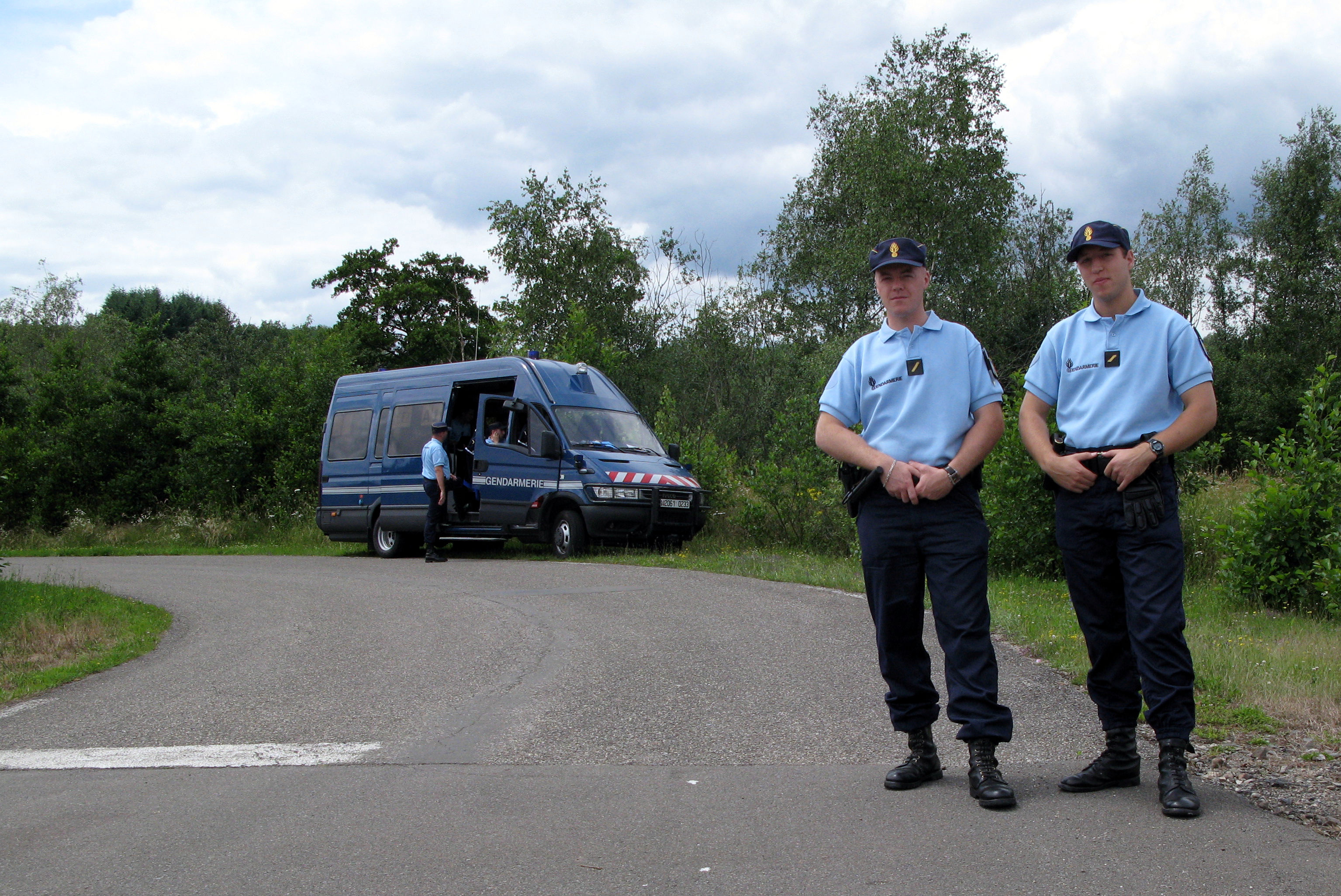
Gendarmes in a relaxed uniform, with soft hats

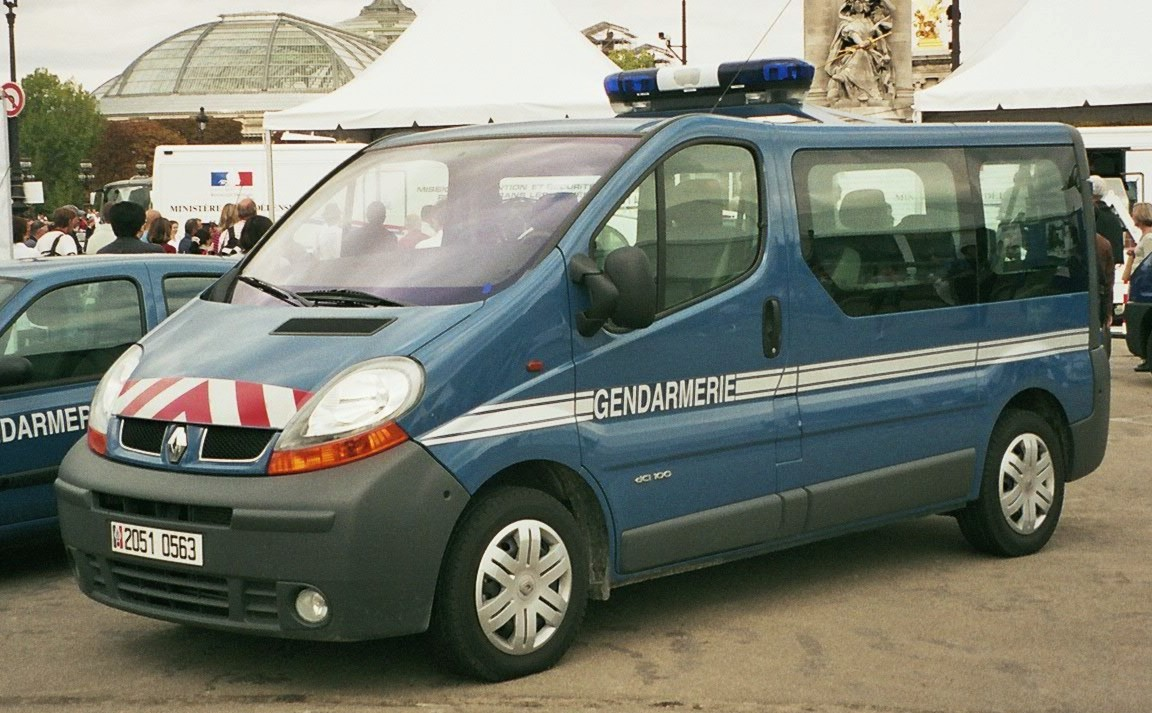
Renault Trafic Gendarmerie van

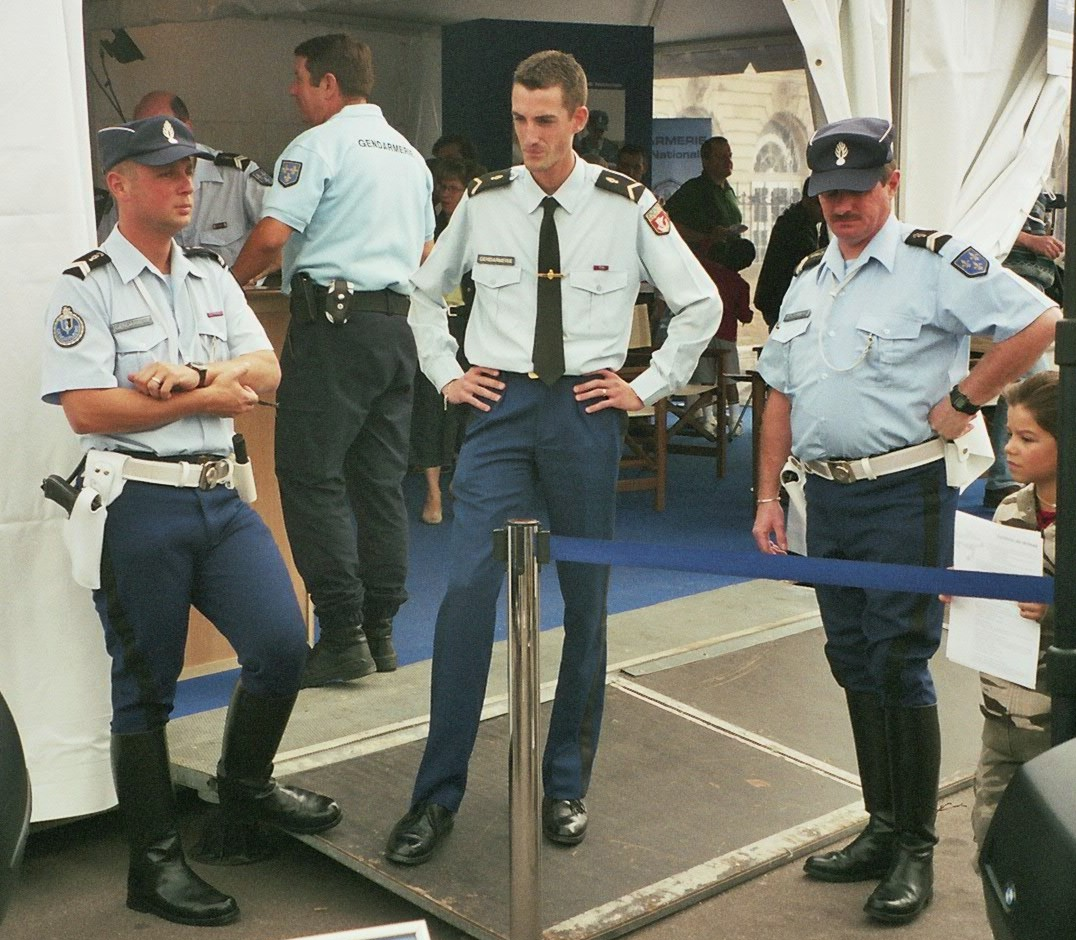
Gendarmes without kepis in an older uniform

The Departmental Gendarmerie (French: Gendarmerie Départementale) is the territorial police branch of the French National Gendarmerie. The Departmental Gendarmerie has regular contact with the population and conducts local policing functions throughout the French territory.

The Departmental Gendarmerie is sometimes called "La Blanche" after the colour of the silver/white unit and rank insignia they wear in contrast to the golden insignia of the Mobile Gendarmerie. In France white or silver insignia traditionally indicates a mounted arm and the white insignia evolved from the gendarmerie's origins as a predominantly mounted force. Its territorial divisions are based on the administrative divisions of France, particularly the departments from which the Departmental Gendarmerie derives its name.

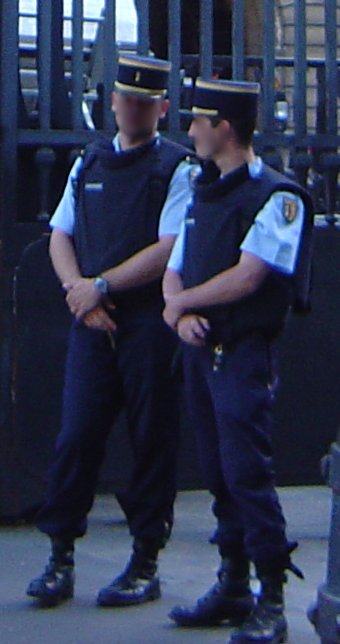
Gendarmerie guard the Palace of Justice in Paris

== Higher organization ==
It is divided into regions (headed by a general, one for each defense zone). These are divided into areas (formerly legions and headed by a colonel), one for each of the 12 metropolitan administrative Regions of France. The legions are divided into groupements (one for each of the 100 départements, thus the name). The groupements are divided into compagnies (one for each of the 342 arrondissements).

== Organization ==
The basic organization is the gendarmerie squad or platoon sized "brigade", which includes from 6 to 40 gendarmes, and are generally located at the level of the canton. The brigades can be organized in groups of brigades with HQ in the shire town and brigades of proximity or in autonomous brigades.

Each brigade is in charge of the monitoring one or several communes day and night as well as reception with the public. The gendarmes there receive the complaints, carry out the investigations administrative and legal and in a general way answer emergency calls.

Brigades of a district form a company. The companies of a department form a grouping and the groupings of an administrative area form an area since the territorial reorganization of July 1, 2005. Previously the areas took the name of “legions”. One counts 22 areas of departmental gendarmerie today.

Thus, each hierarchical level of the departmental gendarmerie corresponds to a level of the administration of the territory. Each hierarchical level is ordered by an officer, person in charge for the units of the departmental gendarmerie placed under its spring. It is the corresponding one in load of the public safety of the administrative authority.

There are approximately 3,600 cantonal brigades.

== Special units ==
In addition to the brigades, the departmental gendarmerie contain units specialized in certain missions:

- The groups of monitoring and intervention of gendarmerie (PSIG), gathered within the companies of departmental gendarmerie provide patrols which intervene and reinforce the brigades. These units either increase the number of patrols in the streets, or to face event private individuals (interpellations, search for criminals…). One finds a PSIG by district in general.
- Motorized units, gendarmes motorcyclists in charge of the monitoring of the road network, called the Departmental Squadron of Road safety (EDSR); qualified in the whole department. The Motorized Motorway Brigades, Groups and the Rapid Intervention Brigades are also in the EDSR.
- The Research Brigades and Sections (Br on the level of the districts, BDRIJ on the level of the departments and SR on the level of the Court of Appeal), are made up only of legal senior police officers. They are exclusively in charge of the missions of the Criminal Investigation Department. They assist the brigades, ensure the technical police operations and take into account the direction of the important investigations; they are in charge of the investigations touching with the average and the great delinquency.
- The reservists of the departmental gendarmerie takes part in the daily newspaper with the reinforcement of the units of departmental Gendarmerie. They are organized in PRGD (group of reserve of departmental gendarmerie). Initially one found a PRGD by departmental squad of gendarmes (one per department).

This organization is in the course of modification with the recasting of the PRGD in PRSIG (group of reserve of monitoring and intervention of the gendarmerie) in order to better adapt to the needs of and the reinforcement of the commune units. The PRSIG are more and more frequently associated a company and either limited to one by grouping.
