= Mobile Gendarmerie =

Public order subdivision of the French National Gendarmerie

Mobile Gendarmerie Gendarmerie mobile
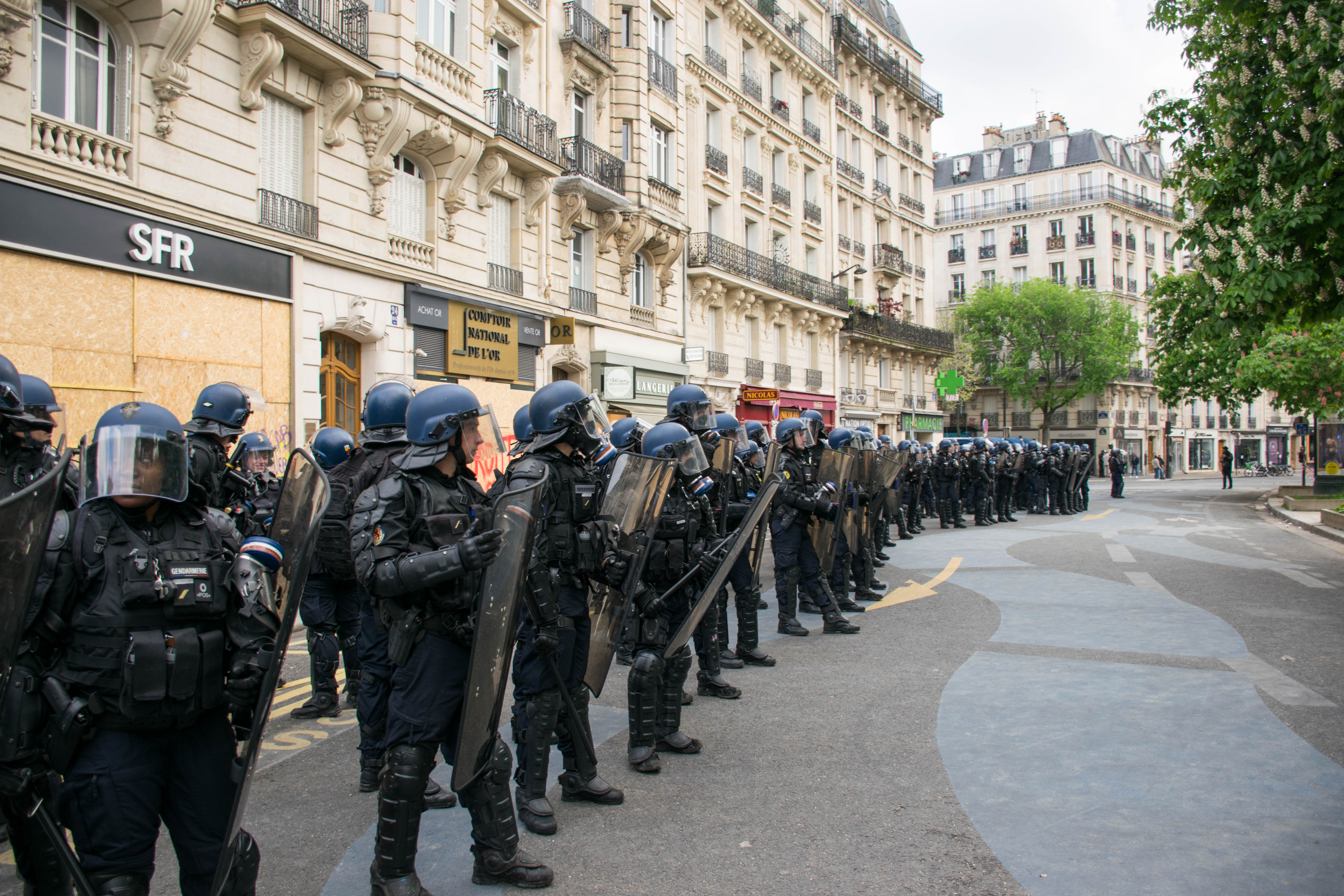
- Gendarmes mobiles during a May Day demonstration in Paris, 2023
- Abbreviation: GM

Agency overview
- Formed: 1927
- Employees: 12,502 (2022)

Jurisdictional structure
- Operations jurisdiction: France
- General nature: Gendarmerie
- Specialist jurisdiction: Paramilitary law enforcement, counter insurgency, riot control

The Mobile Gendarmerie (French: Gendarmerie mobile, GM) is a subdivision of the French National Gendarmerie whose main mission is to maintain public order (from crowd control to riot control) and general security. Contrary to the Departmental Gendarmerie, whose jurisdiction is limited to specific parts of the territory, the Mobile Gendarmerie can operate anywhere in France and even abroad as the Gendarmerie is a component of the French Armed Forces. Although the term "mobile" has been used at different times in the 19th century, the modern Mobile Gendarmerie was created in 1921.

The Mobile Gendarmerie is nicknamed la jaune (lit. 'the yellow one') because of its golden rank insignia, the traditional color of infantry in the French Army (the Departmental Gendarmerie, like most Gendarmerie branches wear the silver insignia of the cavalry and other mounted arms).

The Mobile Gendarmerie is often mistaken with the National Police's Compagnies Républicaines de Sécurité (CRS), as some of their missions are similar. However, the gendarmes are part of the military while the CRS is civilian. (Note: Both the press and the man in the street frequently call "CRS" any policeman in riot gear and wearing a helmet, whether he is a true CRS, a policeman, or a gendarme mobile. CRS and gendarmes can be distinguished by the color of their helmets (blue for the gendarmes, black with two yellow stripes for the CRS. The CRS also wear a large red CRS patch.)

== History ==
The term "mobile" was used at various times in the 18th and 19th centuries to name various Gendarmerie or mixed Gendarmerie-Army units: mobile battalions, mobile columns, etc. engaged in public order duties. By the beginning of the 20th century, it was realized that there was a need for an intermediate force between the Police and the Army, which until then had been frequently called upon in case of trouble, very often with disastrous results (fraternization in a few cases, use of excessive violence in most of the others). The Departmental Gendarmerie (Note: The term Departmental Gendarmerie is used here for better understanding although it wasn't in use yet at the time) also contributed platoons composed of gendarmes on temporary duty taken from local brigades (Note: The brigade is a local unit, typically four to six men strong.) but these men had received no specific training in crowd control, were not under the command of their regular officers and this service was not popular as it took the men away from the brigades for weeks at a time and considerably disrupted the service. Still, many lawmakers were reluctant to create a dedicated force which – they thought – would be costly and might become a new Praetorian guard.

Starting in 1917, platoons from the Provost Gendarmerie (a branch of the Gendarmerie set up as a military police force for the duration of the war) were frequently used in crowd control and riot control duties during demonstrations – even in large cities away from the front.

In 1921, it was finally decided to begin the raising of "Mobile Gendarmerie platoons" in the Departmental Gendarmerie. Platoons, either horse mounted or on foot, were composed of 40 gendarmes (60 in the Paris Region). In 1926, the platoons formed the Garde Républicaine mobile (GRM), (Note: Not to be confused with the Groupes mobiles de réserve (GMR) created by the Vichy regime during the Second World War, which were superseded by the CRS at the end of the war.) which became a separate branch of the Gendarmerie in 1927, the platoons becoming part of companies and legions. By 1940, the GRM was a force 21,000 strong, composed of 14 légions, 54 company groups and 167 companies. (Note: A légion can be compared to a regiment but with a variable number of companies based in separate barracks spread over a large territory. The company group was an additional subdivision present only in large legions and was comparable to a battalion.)

Long the only large force specialized in maintaining or restoring law and order during demonstrations or riots, the GRM progressively developed the doctrine and skills needed in that role: exercise restraint, avoid confrontation as long as possible, always leave an "exit door" for the crowd, etc.

More than 6,000 GMR gendarmes fought in 1940, either as in-line Gendarmerie combat units or as detached personnel seconded to the Army, more than 300 of them has been killed. After the 1940 armistice, the Germans demanded that the GRM be disestablished. La Garde, a new organization 6,000 strong, was created separate from the Gendarmerie but staffed primarily with former GRM gendarmes. It was attached first to the minimal French Armistice Army remaining in the unoccupied zone, and then to the Ministry of the Interior after the whole country was occupied in the wake of the Allied landings in Africa in November 1942. Being attached to the cavalry branch of the Army, the Garde traded its companies for squadrons.

After the Liberation, the Garde was disbanded and the GMR was recreated within the Gendarmerie under the new designation of Garde républicaine. (Note: The current Garde républicaine was then known as "Garde républicaine de Paris") In 1954, it acquired its present name of Gendarmerie mobile.

The Garde républicaine/Gendarmerie mobile served during both the Indochina and Algerian conflicts. In metropolitan France, its main missions remained first, that of maintaining law and order during demonstrations and second, to assist the Departmental Gendarmerie in its general security missions at home. An additional mission during the Cold War was Défense opérationnelle du Territoire (DOT) or territorial operational defense against infiltrated enemy or subversive elements in either peacetime or war, for which the Mobile Gendarmerie was partially equipped with armoured vehicles and tanks. During the post-war years, all new Gendarmes started their career in the Mobile Gendarmerie.

In 2009, the Gendarmerie, although remaining part of the French Armed Forces, was attached to the Ministry of the Interior, which already supervised the National Police, without any change to its mission. As a consequence of that change, the formal requisition process which the Ministry of the Interior needed in order to use Mobile Gendarmerie forces is not used anymore.

== Missions ==
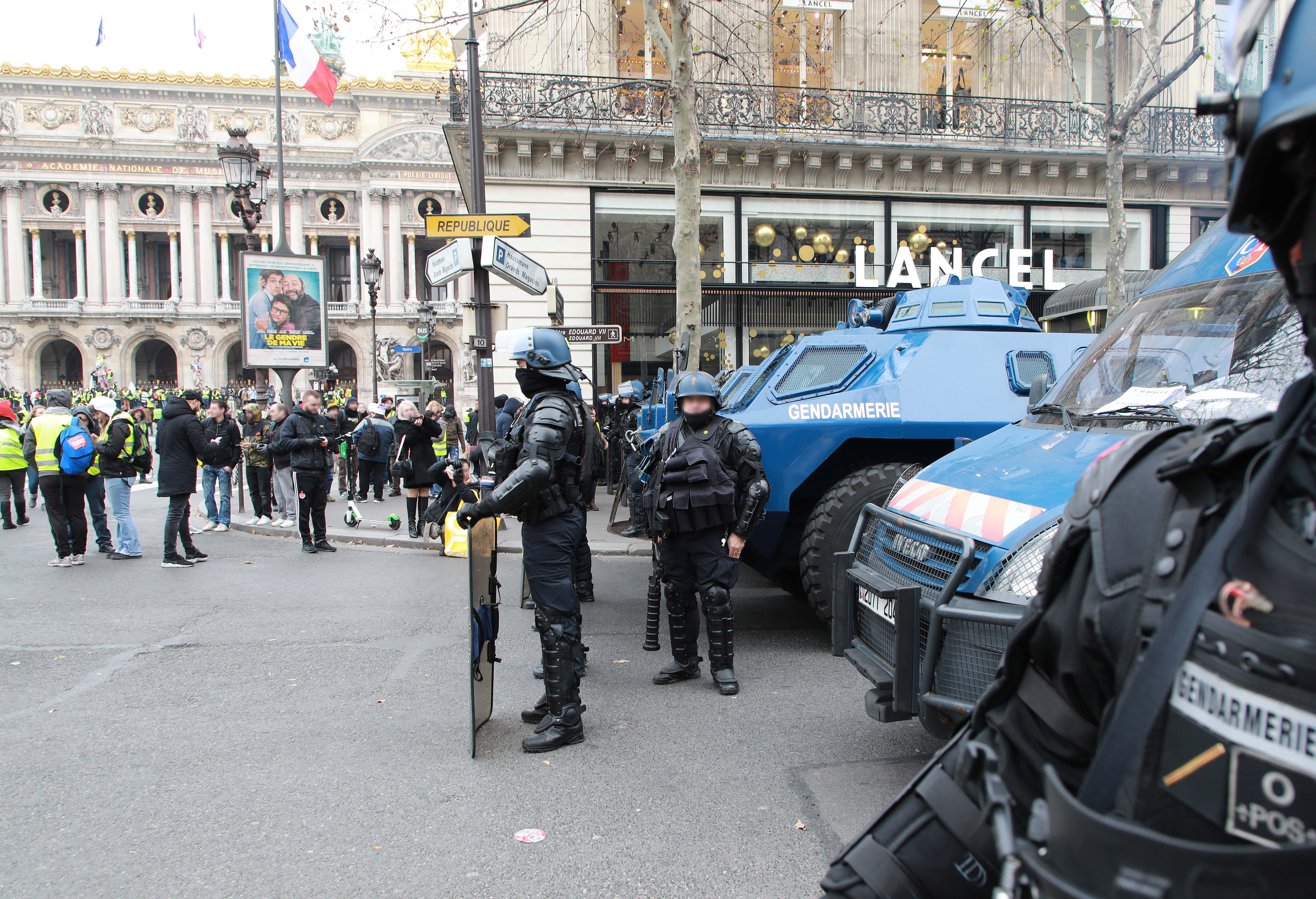
Mobiles Gendarmes during yellow vests protests in 2018

The GM's main missions include:

- crowd control and security during demonstrations and public events
- riot control
- reinforcement of the Departmental Gendarmerie in its general security missions
- escort of high-risk convoys (large money transfers, nuclear waste convoys, etc.)
- protection of high-risk sites (US and Israel embassies etc.)
- participation in missions of the French Armed Forces abroad (called "external operations" or Opex).

== Organisation ==
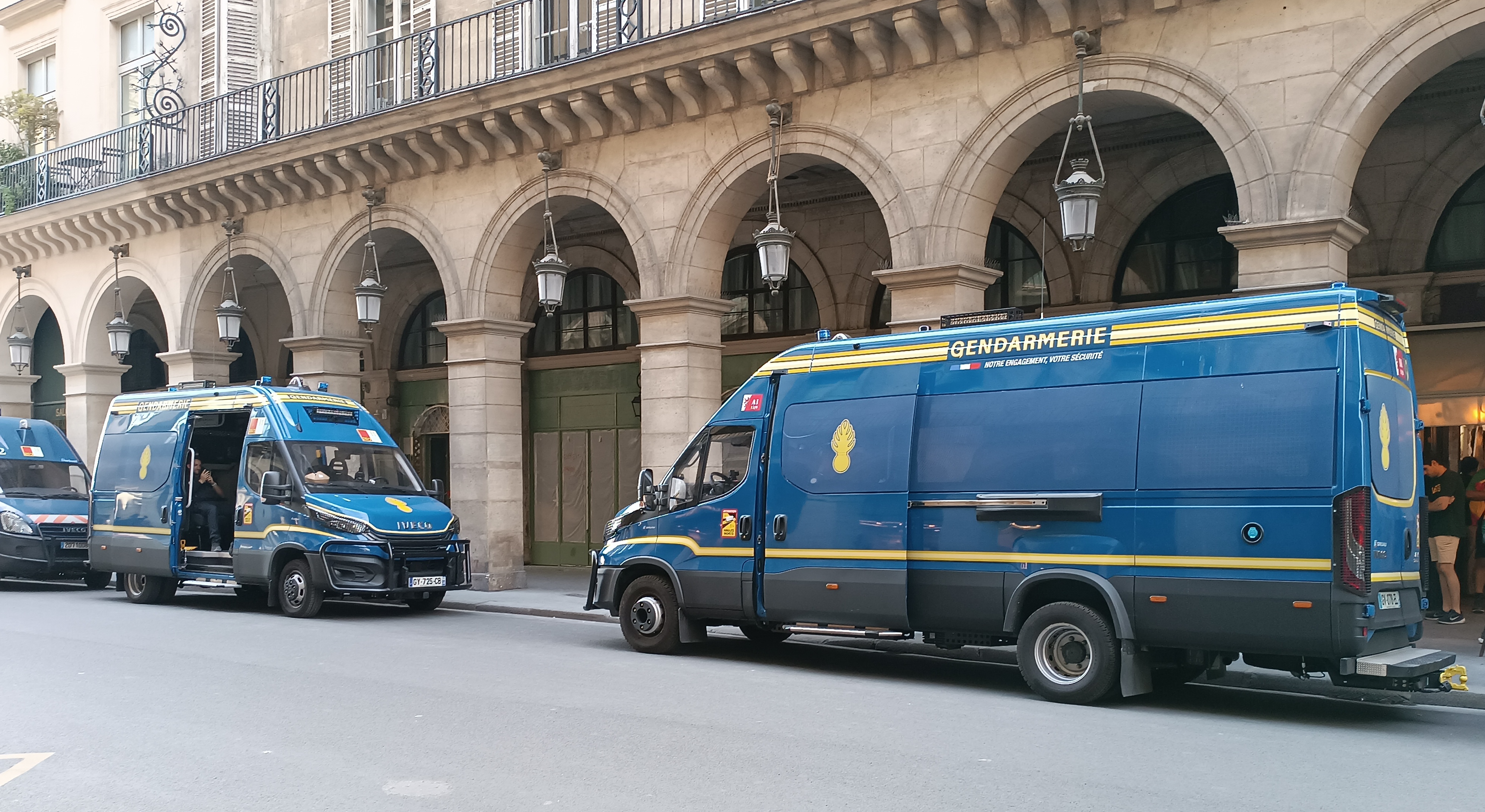
A Mobile Gendarmerie squadron during 2024 Paris Olympics

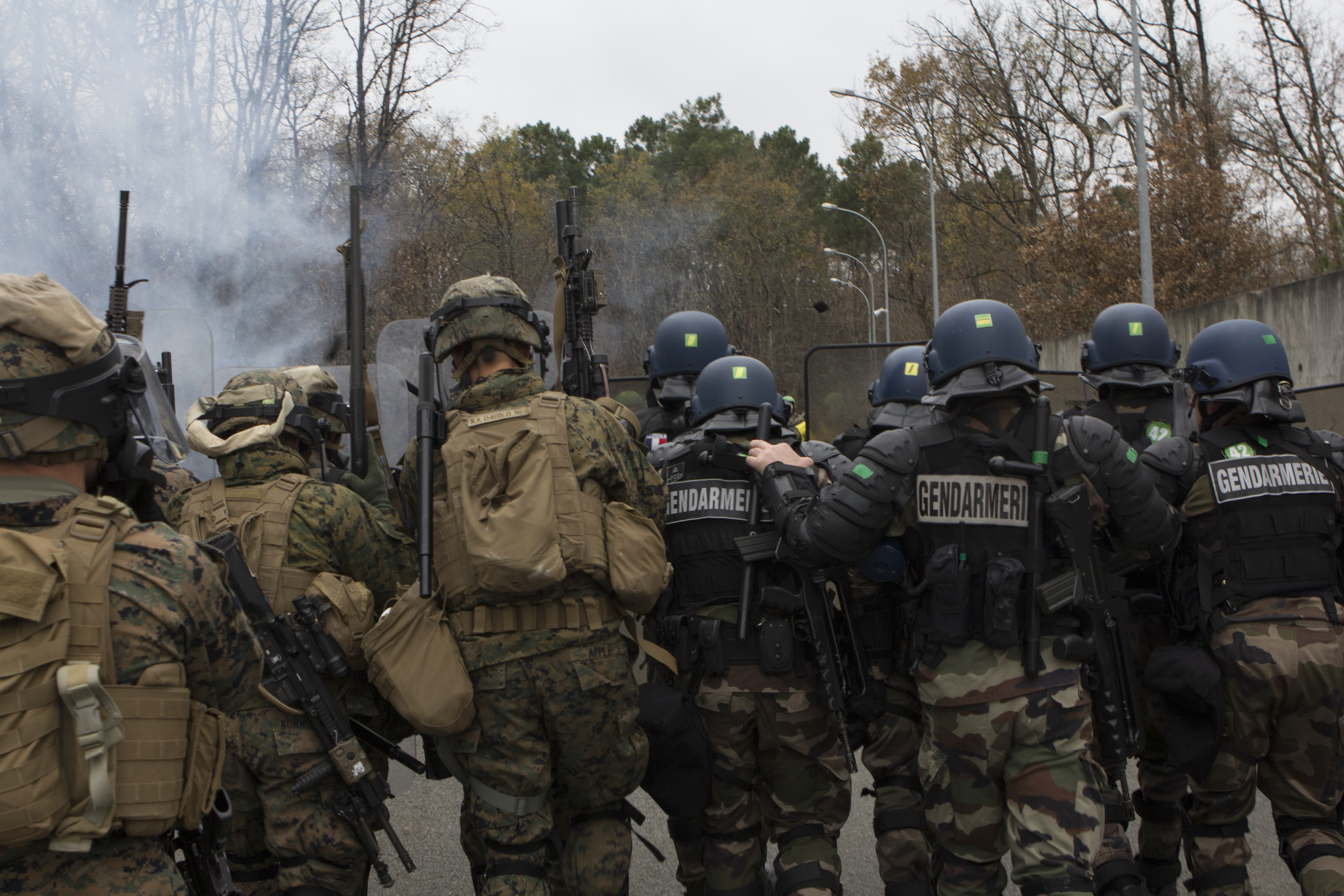
Gendarmes mobiles practicing riot-control with US Marines in Saint-Astier

The territorial organisation of the GM is as follows:

- 7 Zonal Gendarmerie Regions corresponding to the seven metropolitan National Defense Zones.
- 18 Mobile Gendarmerie Groupings (French: Groupements de gendarmerie mobile), including one armoured grouping based in Satory, near Versailles in the Paris area.
- 109 squadrons (Note: 'Squadron' in the British sense of the term. The equivalent US unit would be a troop or a company.) (French: Escadrons de gendarmerie mobile or EGM), each led by a major (French: chef d'escadron) or a captain (French: capitaine).
- 1 National Gendarmerie Intervention Group (GIGN) with a central unit and fourteen regional branches called AGIGNs (French: Antennes du GIGN). Their missions include counter-terrorism, hostage rescue, surveillance of national threats, protection of government officials and targeting of organized crime. GIGN is able to deploy a 200 men hostage rescue team to manage a major crisis.
- approx. 12,000 personnel.

The Gendarmerie has a dedicated training facility, the National Gendarmerie forces training center (French: Centre national d'entraînement des forces de gendarmerie), in Saint-Astier (Dordogne), which duplicates an urban environment. Every squadron takes a two-week refresher training in riot-control techniques there every other year.

18 to 20 of the 109 squadrons are permanently deployed on a rotational basis in the French overseas departments and territories.

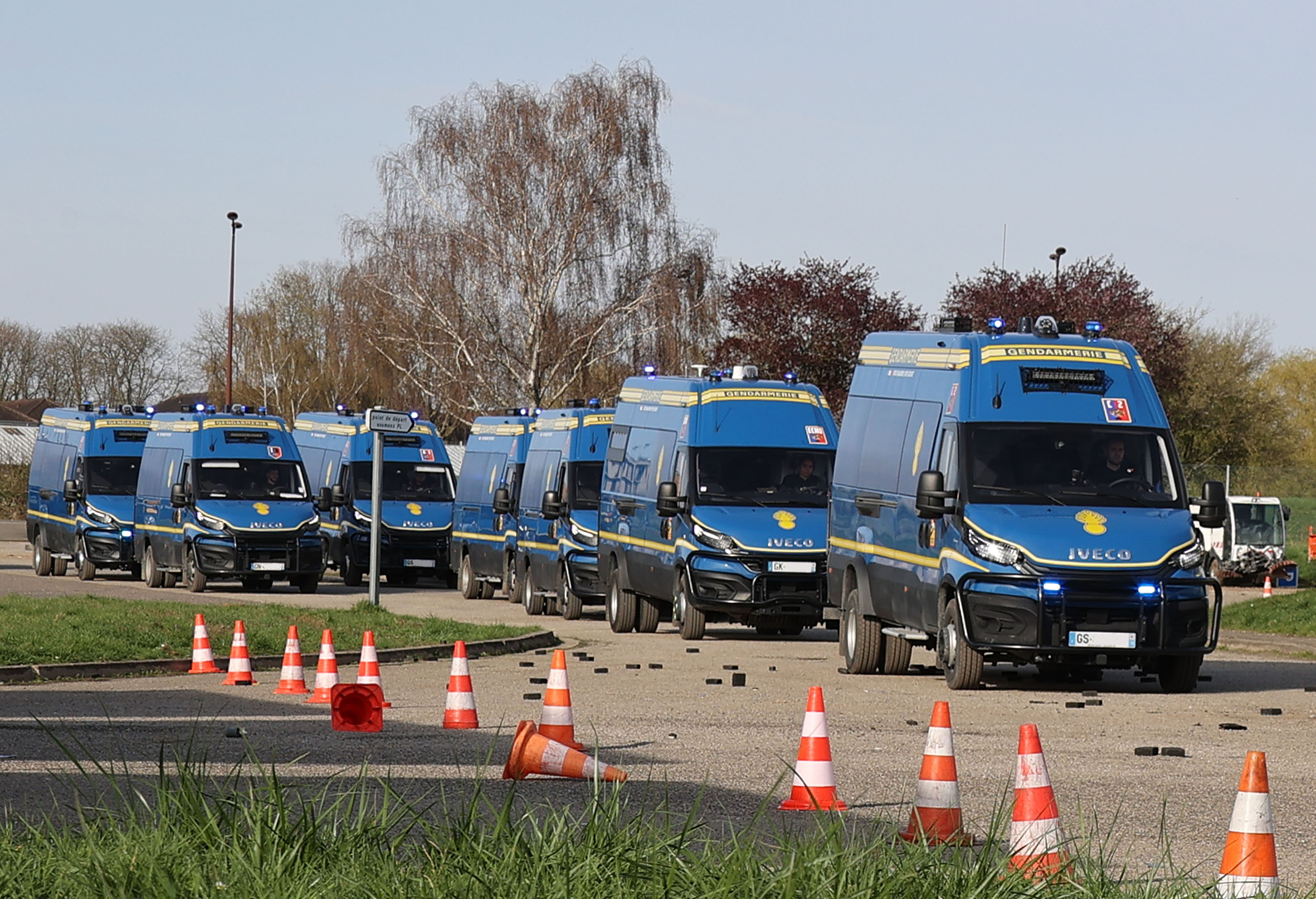
Mobile Gendarmerie vehicles

Until 2015, there used to be Reserve Mobile Gendarmerie squadrons but they were disestablished and all reserve personnel are now regrouped in reserve Departmental Gendarmerie units.

=== Zonal Gendarmerie Regions ===
Since 2016, metropolitan France has been divided into 12 administrative regions (plus Corsica) and the Departmental Gendarmerie has followed this pattern with 13 Gendarmerie Regions. (Note: Prior to the 2016 reform, there were 22 administrative regions and 22 Gendarmerie regions.) The general officer in charge of a region whose capital is also the seat of a Defense Zone (called a Zonal Region) heads all Mobile Gendarmerie forces of that region. (Note: From 1991 to 2005, the Groupings of a given Zonal Region formed a Mobile Gendarmerie Legion. Since 2005, they report directly into the Zonal Region.) The number of Zonal regions, which went down from nine to seven in 2000, was left unchanged in the 2016 reform.

=== Mobile Gendarmerie Groupings ===
A grouping (French: Groupement de gendarmerie mobile, or GGM) is an administrative echelon under the command of a lieutenant-colonel, a "full" colonel or a brigadier general. Groupings are comparable to battalions or regiments but, contrary to these units, their size is not standardized as they include from four to ten squadrons. Where the situation so warrants (such as in large demonstrations or public events), squadrons from different groupings can be gathered into a "Tactical Gendarmerie Grouping" (French: Groupement tactique de gendarmerie, or GTG) under the operational command of a grouping commander. If need be, several GTGs form an "Operational Grouping for Maintaining Order" (French: Groupement opérationnel de maintien de l'ordre, or GOMO) under the command of a full colonel.

=== Mobile Gendarmerie squadrons ===
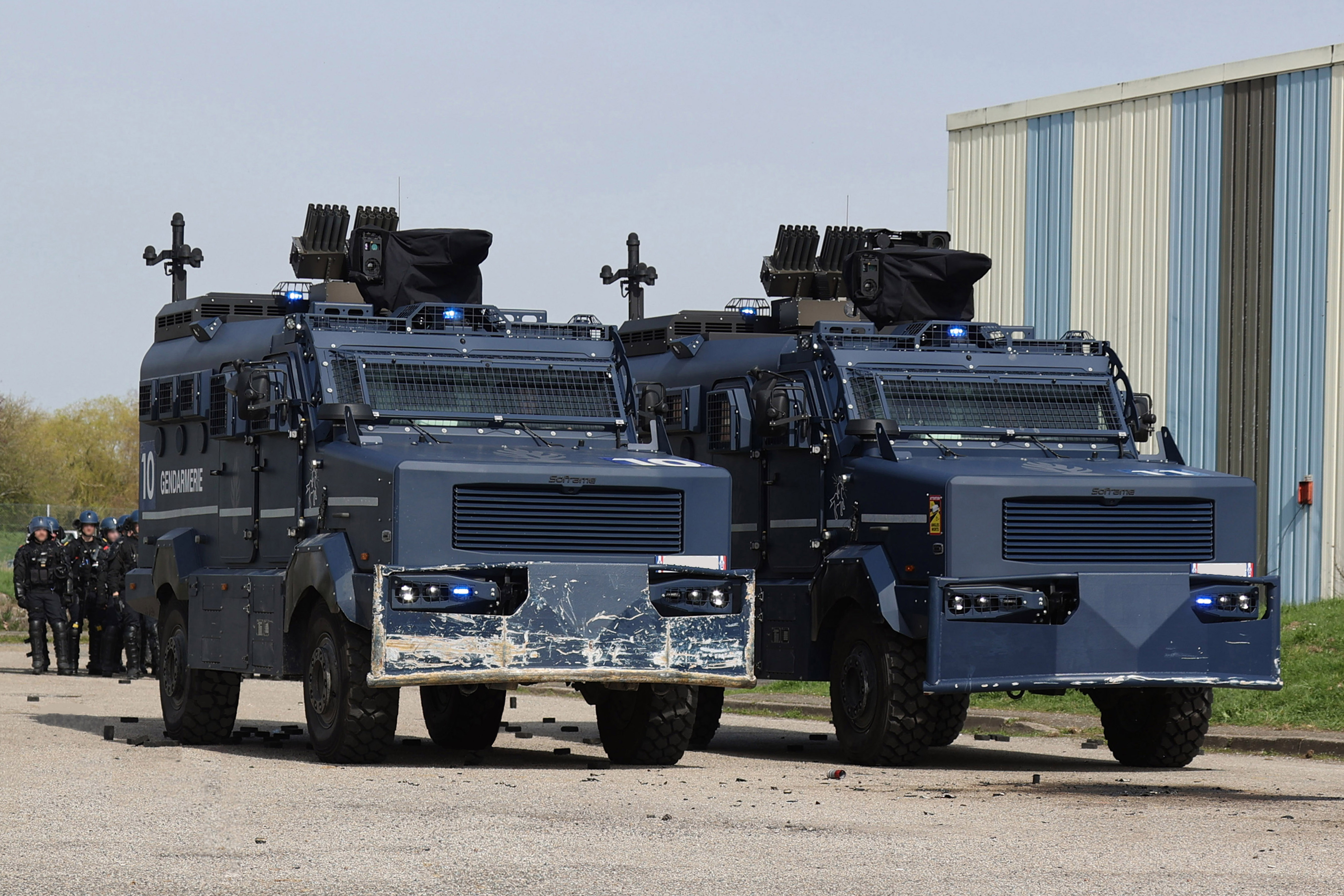
VIPG Centaure of the Gendarmerie

A mobile squadron of gendarmes (French: Escadron de gendarmerie mobile or EGM) is composed of approx. 115 personnel members (including female gendarmes) under the command of a major (French: chef d'escadron) or captain (French: capitaine). The squadron is organized as follows:

- One headquarters platoon (French: Peloton hors rang) in charge of administration and logistics.
- Four line platoons including three regular and one "Intervention" platoon. The Intervention platoon (Peloton d'Intervention or PI) is specialized in difficult riot control missions such as the arrest of violent demonstrators. It also reinforces the departmental Gendarmerie for high-risk judicial arrests. It is formed of 18 gendarmes, whose particular missions (arrests, escorts...) require specialised training and equipment.

There are two types of GM squadrons: regular squadrons and armoured squadrons of the armoured grouping equipped with VIPG Centaure armoured wheeled vehicles (French: Véhicule d'intervention polyvalent de la Gendarmerie), successors of the VBRG armoured wheeled vehicles (French: Véhicule blindé à roues de la Gendarmerie).

On public order mission, a squadron typically deploys three or four platoons (six or eight vans) and a command vehicle.

Each squadron (EGM) is identified by a three-digit number, such as EGM 15/6 in Nîmes. The numbers are determined as follows:

- 1st digit = number of the mobile grouping in the region.
- 2nd digit = number of the squadron in the grouping.
- 3rd digit = number of the zonal region.

=== National Gendarmerie Intervention Group (GIGN) ===
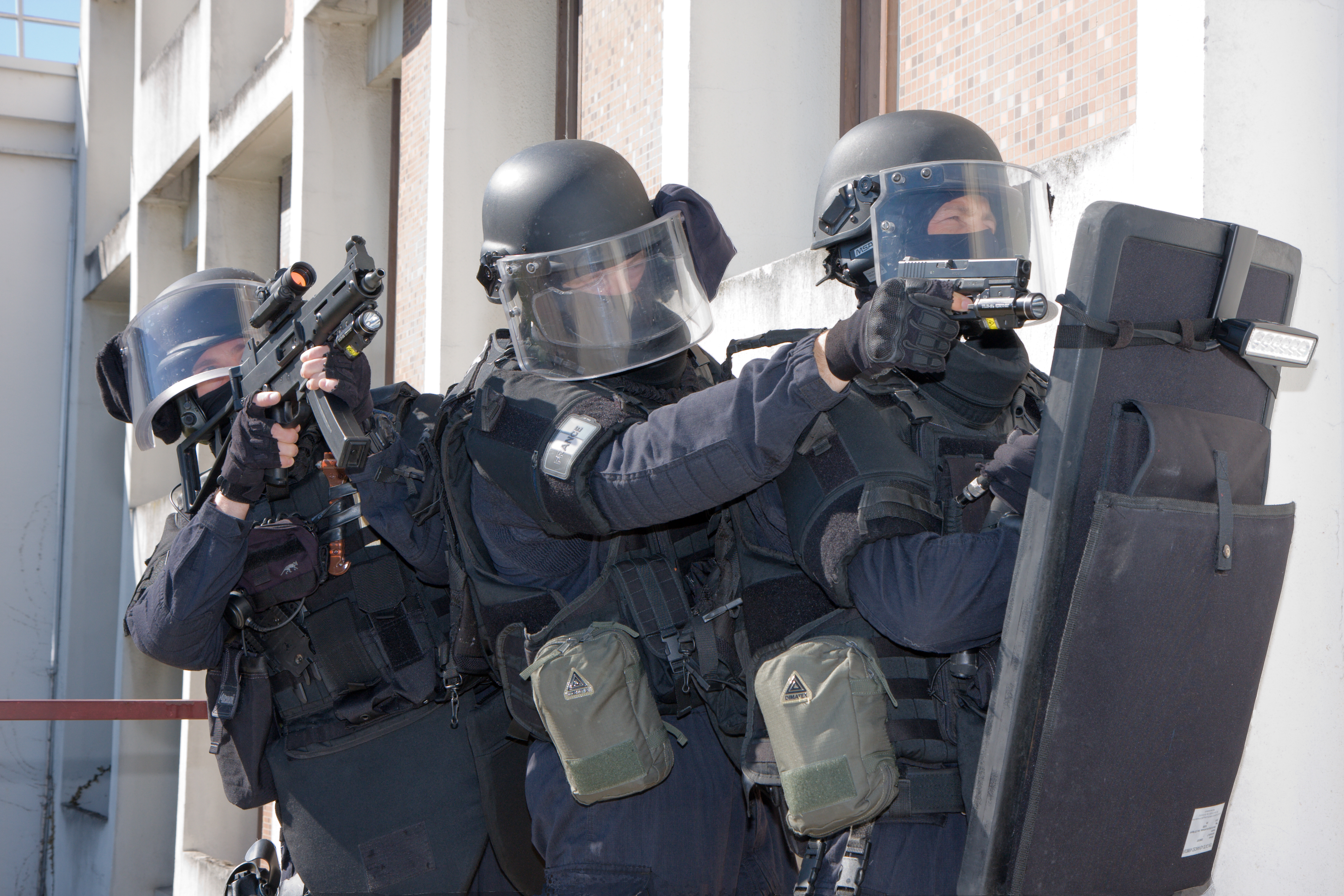
Operatives from a regional GIGN branch

Groupe d'intervention de la Gendarmerie nationale is the elite law enforcement and special operations unit of the French National Gendarmerie. Its missions include counter-terrorism, hostage rescue, surveillance of national threats, protection of government officials and targeting of organized crime.

Although administratively part of the Mobile Gendarmerie, GIGN is in fact an independent unit that reports directly to the Director general of the Gendarmerie Nationale (DGGN) i.e. the chief of staff of the Gendarmerie. The DGGN can take charge in a major crisis; however, most of the day-to-day missions are conducted in support of local units of the Departmental Gendarmerie.

In addition to the main unit, based in Satory, there are fourteen GIGN regional branches (seven in metropolitan France and seven in the overseas departments and territories). These regional units, which were formerly attached to various Mobile Gendarmerie groupings or to the Overseas Gendarmerie command, were fully integrated into GIGN on 1 August 2021.

== Gallery ==
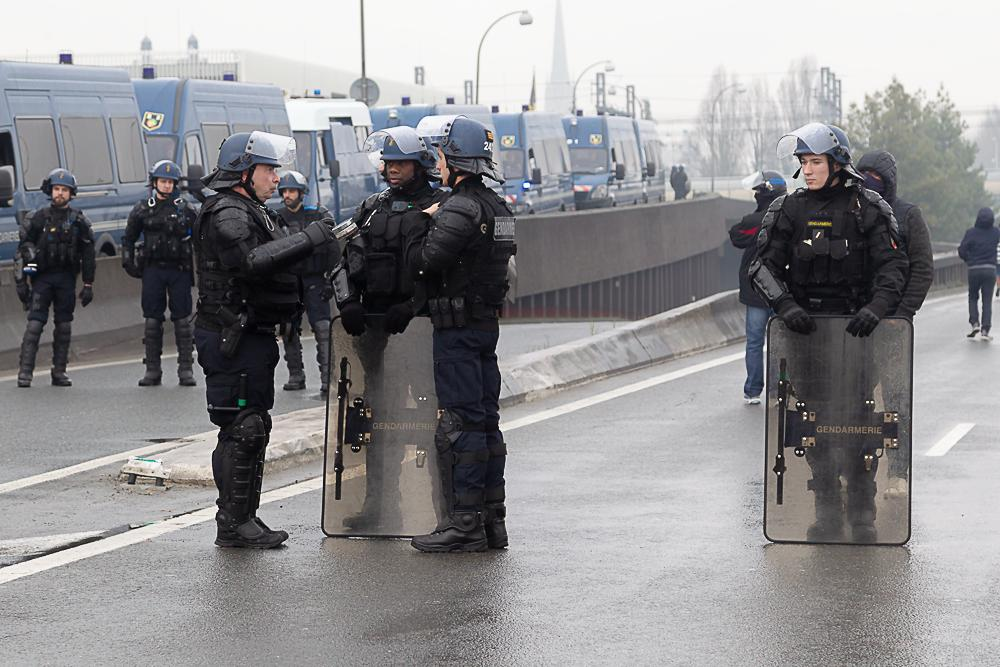
Gendarmes mobiles in anti-riot gear

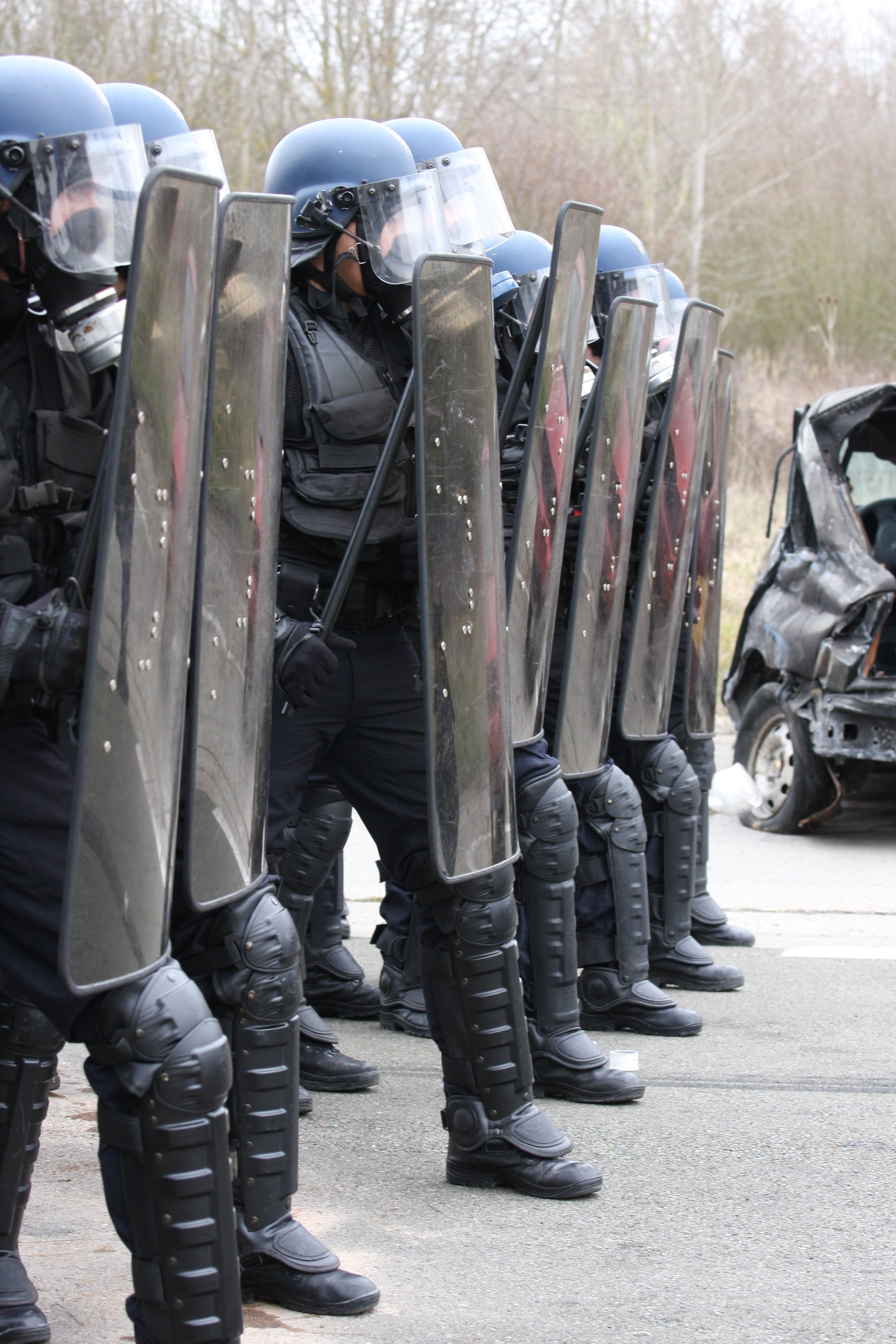
Gendarmes mobiles equipped with shields and gas mask

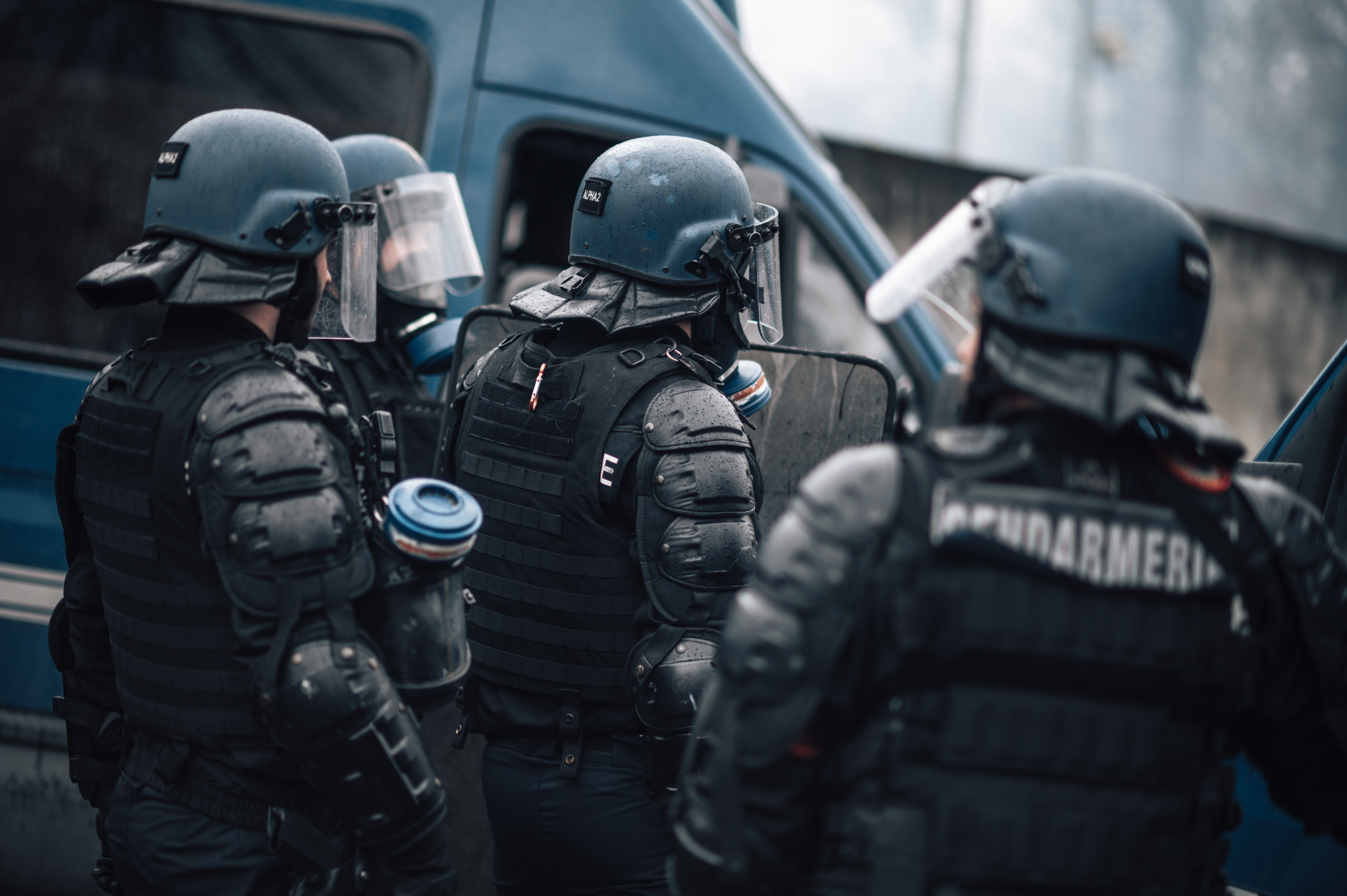
Riot control gear: body armour, shield, tear gas mask

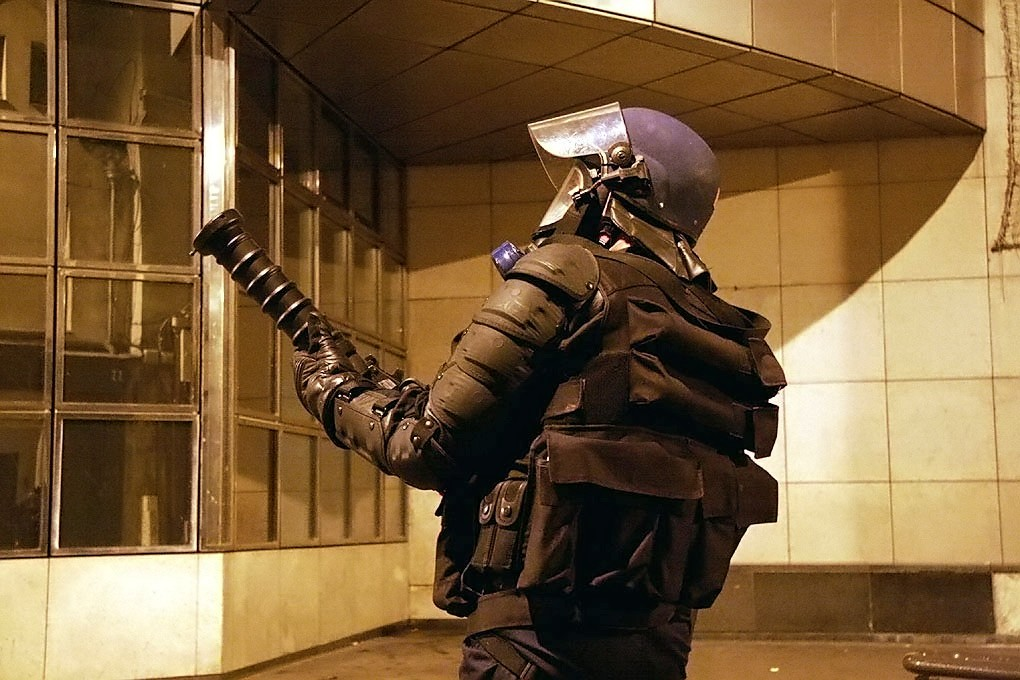
Using tear gas during the 2007-05-06 anti-Nicolas Sarkozy demonstrations at the Bastille

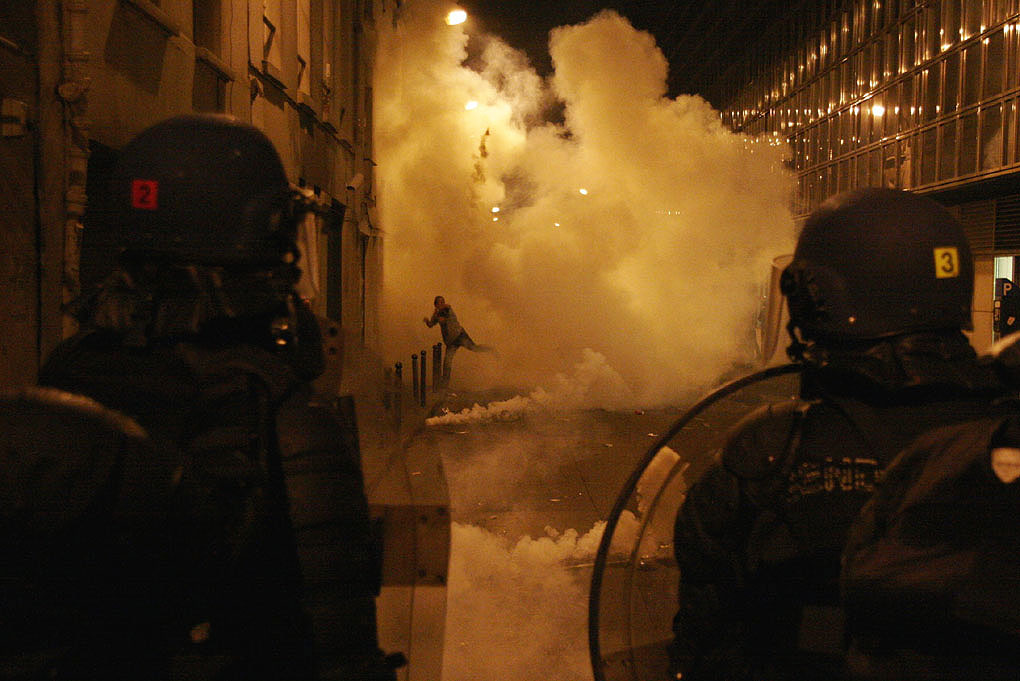
More use of tear gas

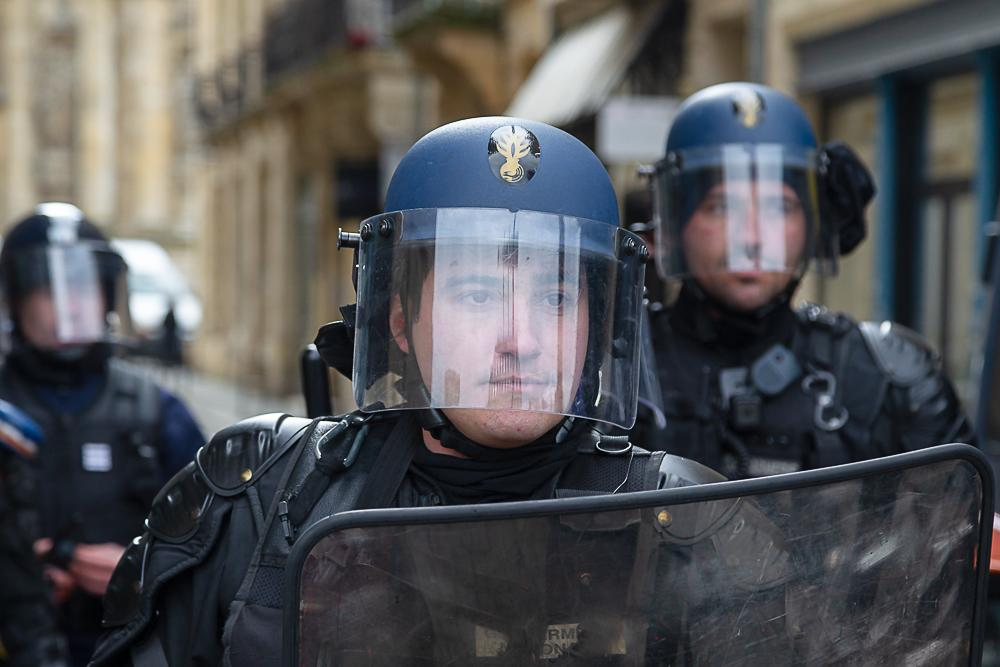
Anti-riot version of the SPECTRA helmet used by the Gendarmerie Mobile

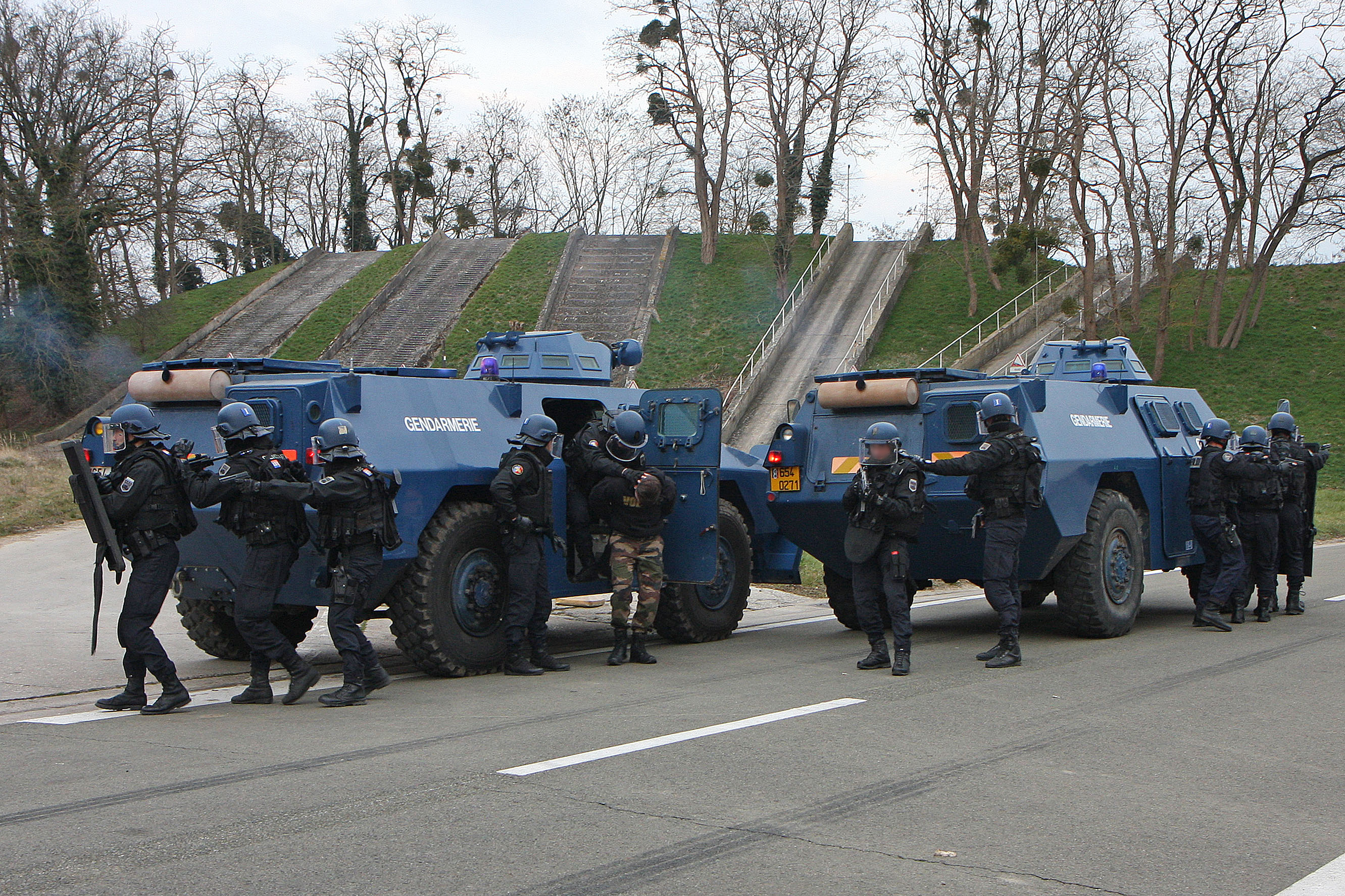
Mobile Gendarmes during riot control training

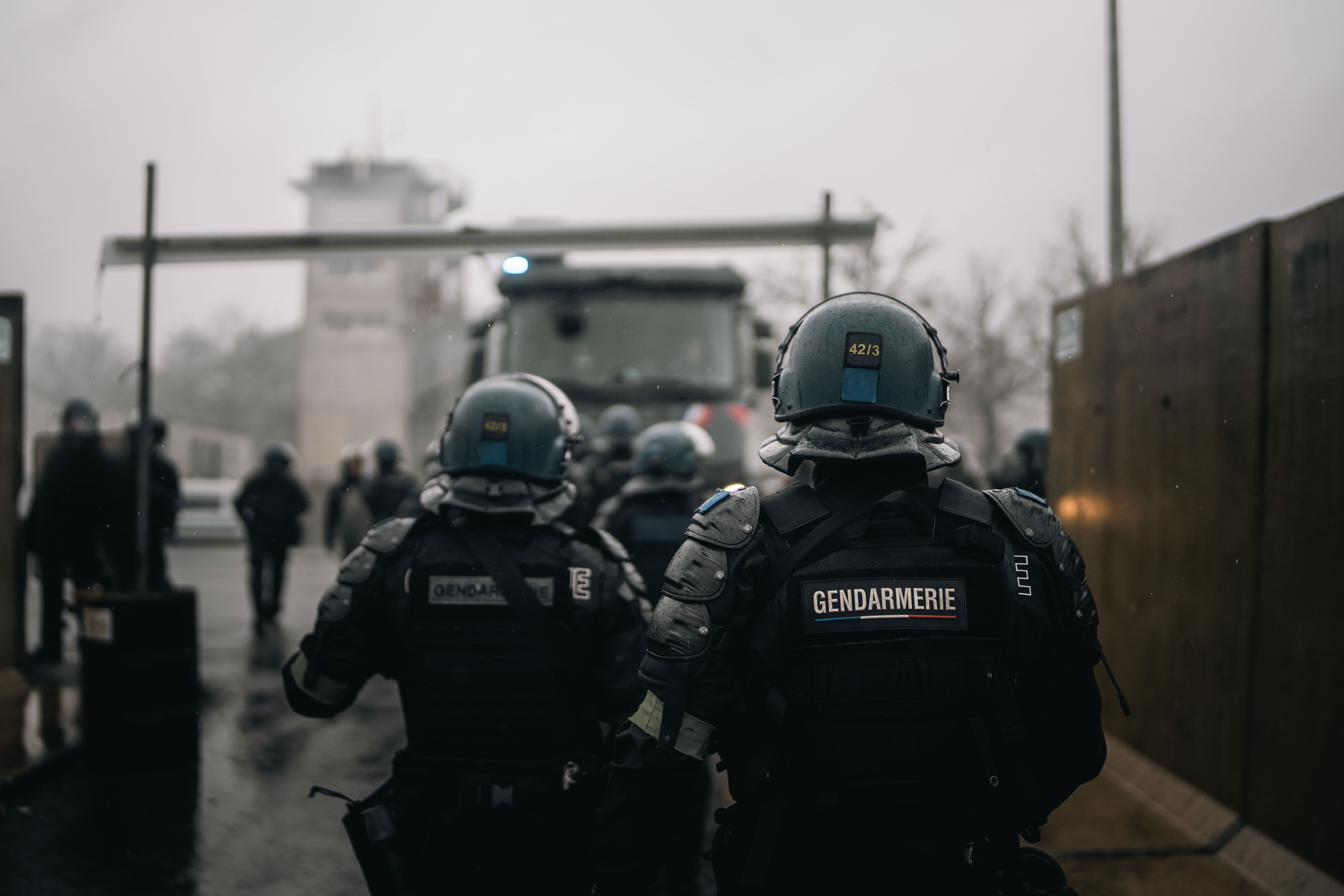
Mobile Gendarmes in training

== See also ==
- Compagnies Républicaines de Sécurité
- Internal Troops
- OMON
- 1st or 2nd Mobile Contingent

== Bibliography ==
- Collective (2006). Encyclopédie de la Gendarmerie Nationale [Encyclopedia of the Gendarmerie Nationale] (in French). Vol. III. Paris: Éditions SPE Barthelemy. ISBN 2-912838-21-5.
- Collective (2007). Histoire de la Gendarmerie mobile d'Ile-de-France [History of the Mobile Gendarmerie in Ile-de-France] (in French). Paris: Éditions SPE Barthelemy. ISBN 978-2-912838-31-5.
- Bruneteaux, Patrick (1996). Maintenir l'Ordre [Maintaining Order] (in French). Paris: Presses de Sciences Po. ISBN 2-7246-0676-0.
- Carrot, Georges (1990). Le Maintien de l'ordre en France au 20e siècle [The Maintenance of Order in France in the 20th Century] (in French). Paris: éditions Veyrieur. ISBN 2-85199-535-9.
- Cazals, Claude (1997). La Garde sous Vichy [La Garde under Vichy] (in French). Paris: éditions La Musse. ISBN 2-904016-01-5.
