= Non-lieu =

French judicial decision

In French criminal law, a non-lieu is a decision taken by an investigating judge to dismiss a criminal case during the judicial investigation phase.

At the end of their investigation, the investigating judge either refers the case to the trial court (ordonnance de renvoi) or issues an ordonnance de non-lieu (a "no-case" judgement). The latter happens when the evidence gathered by the investigation does not justify further action. Non-lieu differs from classement sans suite, which results from a decision by the prosecutor's office not to prosecute a case based on the principle of prosecutorial discretion.

A non-lieu decision is provided for in Article 177-1 and following of the Code of criminal procedure. Under the Ancien régime, it was called "dismissal from court" (French: mise hors de cour, lit. 'put out of court').

== Sources ==
- Steiner, Eva (2010-03-04). French Law: A Comparative Approach. OUP Oxford. ISBN 978-0-19-923237-6.
