= French criminal procedure =

Part of French criminal law

French criminal procedure (procédure pénale) focuses on how individuals accused of crimes are dealt with in the French criminal justice system: how people are investigated, prosecuted, tried, and punished for an infraction defined in the penal code. These procedural issues are codified in the French code of criminal procedure (Code de procédure pénale). It is the procedural arm of French criminal law.

French criminal procedure has roots in customary law of the Ancien regime under Louis XIV, and was first codified with the Code of criminal procedure of 1808 (Code d'instruction criminelle). This was replaced in 1959 with the Code of criminal procedure (Code de procédure pénale; CPP).

The main groups involved in the administration of criminal justice in France are the courts, the Public Ministry (France), and the judicial police. Criminal courts are structured in three levels, with the Police court and the Correctional court in the first instance; appeals are held by the Cour d'appel and the Cour de Cassation.

Courts involved include the police court and the correctional court at the first level or instance, and the Cour d'Appel and Cour de Cassation at the second and third instance. Traditionally, the legal system for administering criminal justice in France has been and continues to be the inquisitorial system, but more and more, aspects of the adversarial system, such as plea bargaining, have been included as well.

The typical stages of criminal procedure include: reporting an offense, police investigation, prosecution, judicial investigation, trial, and sentencing. During the investigation phase, various powers are available to assist, such as: garde à vue (remand in custody); arrest, search, and others, all laid out in specific sections of the code.

== Terminology ==
=== Two meanings ===
In France, the term criminal procedure (French: procédure pénale) has two meanings; a narrow one, referring to the process that happens during a criminal case as it proceeds through the phases of receiving and investigating a complaint, arresting suspects, and bringing them to trial, resulting in possible sentencing—and a broader meaning referring to the way the justice system is organized into the actors and institutions involved, chiefly the police, the prosecutors, the Public Ministry, the courts and judges, and their roles and interactions.

=== Criminal law and criminal procedure ===
Criminal law (droit pénale) deals with an individual's rights and obligations under the law, as codified in a penal code. Under French criminal law, the penal code (CP) defines what acts (or omissions) are punishable. Criminal procedure focuses on how individuals accused of crimes are dealt with in the criminal justice system: how people are investigated, prosecuted, tried, and punished. In France, these procedural issues are codified in the Code of criminal procedure (Code de procédure pénale).

== Codification ==
Unlike civil law, which is applied without applying to the courts for the most part, criminal law is carried out through observance of the rules established by a written code, which connects the infraction committed, through a series of procedures leading ultimately to a sentence for an offender found guilty. Whereas civil law and civil procedure are separate areas of law, criminal law and criminal procedure are closely intertwined, and the glue is the code of criminal procedure.

== Sources ==
The sources of criminal procedure are different than the sources of civil law. The domain of criminal procedure is the loi (lit., "law", or "statutes"), in contradistinction to civil law, which are réglements (regulations). Practically speaking, the main difference is that the Constitution specifies in article 34 that criminal procedure is part of the loi, and thus may not be handled by décrets but reserved to acts of Parliament, thus demonstrating the privileged status of criminal procedure within the French legal system, compared to civil law.

== History ==
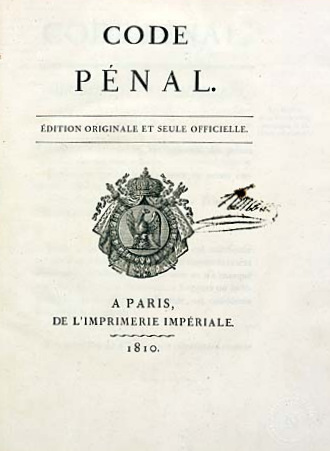
The 1810 Penal Code

French criminal procedure has roots in customary law under the Ancien regime under Louis XIV. The Criminal Ordinance of 1670 dealt with the jurisdiction of the national police force the Maréchaussée.

Major developments included laws passed around the time of the French Revolution in 1791 and 1801, the 1808 code of French criminal procedure (Code d'instruction criminelle), and two years later, the Penal code of 1810. The 1897 law on Criminal defense followed.

Modern criminal procedure was developed at the end of the Fourth Republic, and codified with the promulgation of the provisional title and volume I of the new code in December 1957, which came into force in 1958 and in 1959 with the Code of criminal procedure (Code de procédure pénale).

== Organization ==
The main groups involved in the administration of criminal justice in France are the courts, the Public Ministry, and the judicial police.

=== Criminal courts ===
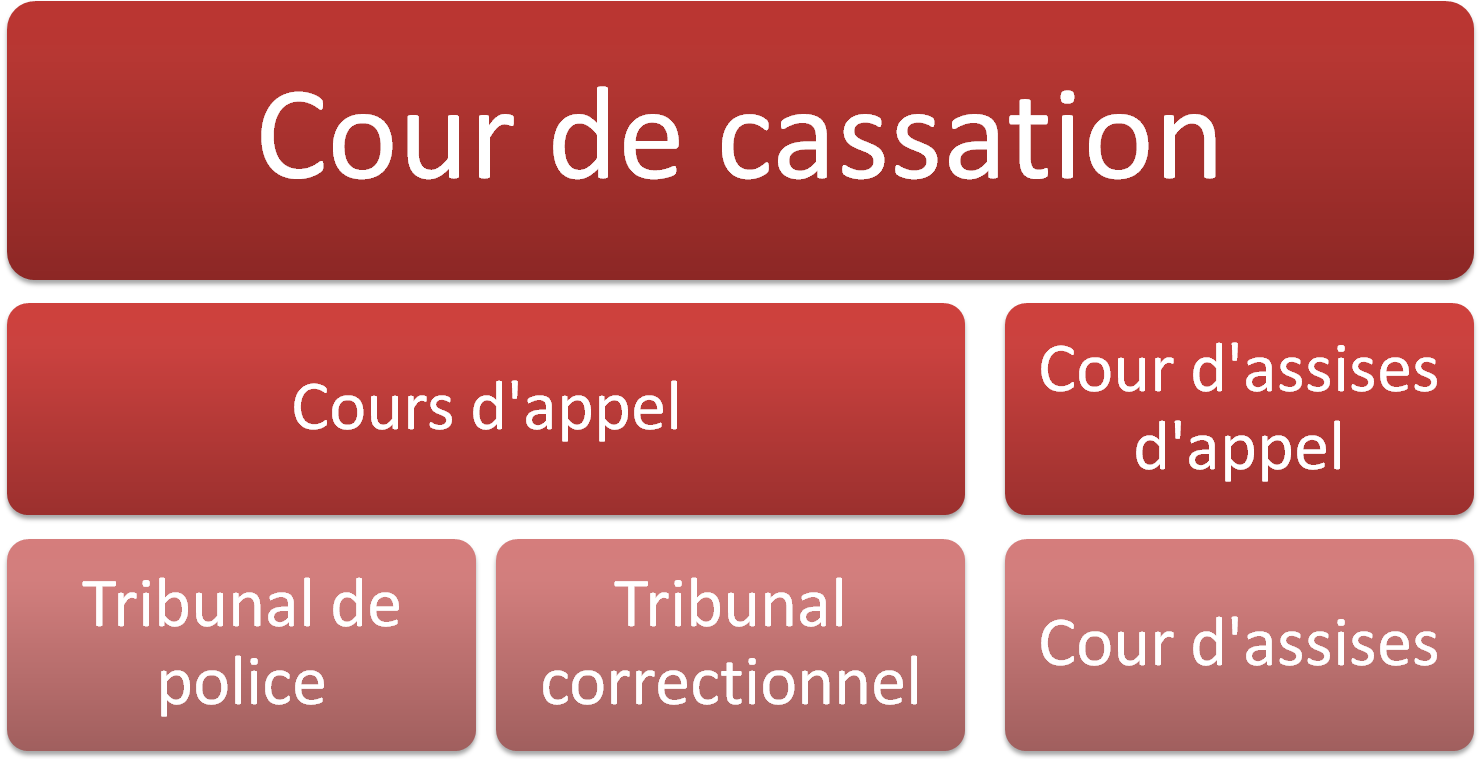
Organization of the French judiciary for criminal matters.

Criminal courts in France are one of two kinds of "ordinary courts" (ordre judiciaire), which handle both criminal and civil litigation.

At the bottom of the hierarchy of ordinary courts are the courts of minor jurisdiction, which, on the criminal law side, may sit as police courts (tribunal de police) to hear summary offenses (such as traffic violations, limited assault, breach of peace). (A particularity of the French judiciary is that the same court may also sit as a civil court (tribunal d'instance) on other occasions to hear minor civil cases.)

Next are the courts of major jurisdiction. When the court hears délits – less serious felonies and misdemeanors – it is called a Criminal court (sometimes, "Correctional court"; tribunal correctionnel), (The major jurisdiction courts may also sit to hear civil cases as a Civil Court. or as a Juvenile Court.)

=== Public ministry ===
In French law, the ministère public or le parquet is the authority charged with defending the interests of society and of the application of law. It is primarily made up of magistrates, but is sometimes represented by other persons such as police officials. Its magistrates can be referred to as "standing" magistrates, as opposed to magistrats du siège (seated magistrates). Its closest equivalent in some English-speaking countries is the (office of the) director of public prosecutions and the attorney general in others.

=== Judicial police ===
The judicial police in France are responsible for the investigation of criminal offenses and identification of perpetrators. This is in contrast to the administrative police, whose goal is to ensure the maintenance of public order and to prevent crime. Article 14 of the French Code of Criminal Procedure provides the legal basis for the authority of the Judicial police.

The Law of 9 July 1966 pushed by Charles de Gaulle established a national police force in France, and created the Central Directorate of the Judicial Police (D.C.P.J.) to oversee the 18 regional offices, and in 1969 the network was extended by the creation of branches and detachments which operated under the regional offices.

== Background ==
=== Legal system ===
Traditionally, the legal system for administering criminal justice in France has been and continues to be primarily the inquisitorial system. Chief characteristics include secrecy (not open to the public), that it is primarily written and not oral, that judges play an important role in the gathering of evidence and investigation of the case, and that parties to the case don't necessarily have a right to be heard. Adversarial systems, on the other hand, emphasize transparency, oral and written expression, placing the parties involved front and center in prosecuting or defending the case, with the judge limited to the role of a referee adjudicating points of law and ensuring fair play.

In the inquisitorial system in France, the courts and judiciary come into the process at an earlier stage than in adversarial systems such as in England and Wales, or in the United States, and are involved with both investigation (instruction) and interrogation. Conversely, the police are less involved with carrying out an investigation than in countries with an adversarial system. A separate set of judges and courts are involved in trying the case, so that there are two separate systems of courts and judges: one for the investigative phase (the juridictions d'instruction), and a second set for trial (juridictions de jugement).

The two investigation phases in French criminal procedure are the preliminary police investigation, and the judicial one carried out by the investigating judge, follow the inquisitorial system, and focus on creating a written dossier including a list all the procedures carried out, witness and expert statements, and the accumulated evidence. Late in the Fifth Republic, some additional protections for the rights of parties involved have added some aspects of the adversarial system to the mix.

=== Sources ===
Sources of criminal procedure are primarily article 34 of the Constitution, and go back to the 1789 Declaration of the Rights of Man and of the Citizen. International sources include the European Convention on Human Rights (ECHR), which have an influence due to article 55 of the Constitution which requires adherence to international treaties such as the ECHR.

==== Customary law ====
Some gaps in statutory law and case law rely on uncodified, customary law from the Ancien regime. Such cases had strict constraints, and had to be considered as binding by the people who applied them, be widely accepted in a particular profession, and had to be consistently used over a long period of time.

=== Principles ===
A criminal proceeding is guided by a set of principles, which have as a goal to ensure a fair trial. The most important of these principles include the presumption of innocence, the rights of the defense, and the timeliness of the proceedings. These principles embody the constitutional block and have been endorsed and extended by the European Court of Human Rights, and the June 2000 law amended the code of criminal procedure to increase guarantees of a fair trial, presumption of innocence, speedy proceedings, and the right to appeal.

==== Presumption of innocence ====
Major principles include the presumption of innocence. This was strengthened in 2000 with additional legal limitations placed upon the freedom of the press in order to protect that presumption, as added to article 35 of the law of 1881 by the Guigou law of 15 June 2000, and elevated to a principle of constitutional force (principe à valeur constitutionnelle) by the Constitutional Council in 1989.

The presumption of innocence is not total, and in some cases, the suspect must prove their innocence, and if they fail, conviction is the default. For example, anyone who fails to demonstrate sufficient financial resources to support their standard of living and who resides with someone who engages in prostitution, is assumed to be a pimp according to article 255-6 of the penal code, unless they furnish proof to the contrary.

==== Benefit of the doubt ====
The benefit of the doubt is closely related to the presumption of innocence, as a procedural application of it. A difference is that benefit of the doubt is not enshrined in either the penal code or in the code of criminal procedure.

==== Right of defense ====
Criminal defendants have rights, such as the right to have an attorney while in police custody, the right to access their police file and to request additional investigations, to object, and to file appeals. Although there isn't a statute that codifies these rights, they are recognized by the law. Judicial texts refer to them as a "fundamental right of constitutional dimension", such as a 1995 text from the Cour de Cassation. Violations of the right to defense will nullify the proceedings.

==== Timeliness ====
Another principle of fairness of the proceedings is "reasonable speed" (délai raisonnable). In 1945, judicial inquiries under the aegis of an investigating judge lasted three months; in 1970, nine months, and in 2008, eighteen months. Part of this is likely due to the fact that most investigations are simpler and no longer handled by investigating judges, and prosecutors now bring the most complex cases to the investigating judges. and they take longer to investigate.

== Stages ==
There are six stages, reporting the offense, the preliminary police investigation, initiating prosecution of the accused, the judicial investigation, the trial, and enforcement of the judgment. In many cases, the investigating judge at their discretion may delegate the second investigation phase to the police as well.

=== Reporting an offense ===
A complaint (plainte) by a victim or a law enforcement official, or a denunciation (dénonciation) by a third party is the initial step in launching a criminal investigation. The report of an offense (infraction) is usually made to the police, but can also be made directly to the public prosecutor's office (Ministère public), which acts on reports from either the police or from the victim.

Once a criminal proceeding (action publique) has been initiated in the criminal courts, the victim may also pursue a civil action (partie civile) for damages resulting from the criminal offense to obtain compensation for his or her loss. This is a specific type of procedure in which a criminal proceeding and a civil proceeding are combined, namely when a criminal prosecution also has a civil portion involving damages attached to it.

=== Police investigation ===
Criminal procedure starts with the investigation phase. The purpose is to gather initial evidence before the prosecution begins.

The investigation has two parts: the preliminary police investigation (enquête préliminaire) and the in-depth investigation (instruction) under the supervision of the court. These two phases take place in secret, in order to protect the defendant (accusé), who is not yet guilty under the presumption of innocence, and to protect the judicial process. This implies some limitations on the freedom of the press, and is codified in article 11 of the CPP.. The secrecy only applies to those taking part in the investigation: police, lawyers, experts, clerks, and others. However the defendant, the victim (victime), and other witnesses are not bound by secrecy, and may speak to anyone, including journalists. Leaks may hurt the search for justice, so the law tries to limit it by the notion of concealment (recel).

The preliminary police investigation takes place under supervision of the public prosecutor's office (procureur). The police charged with the investigation may be either of the two national police forces in France, the National Police or the Gendarmerie.

In this phase, the police make inquiries in order to determine if a crime has been committed, and attempt to find a suspect. There are two national police forces, the National Police, who act in urban areas, and the gendarmes in suburban and rural areas who report to the Ministry of Defense. Police are barred from taking part in the commission of any offense, and thus entrapment is off the table, although there are exceptions for drug and customs offenses.

There are two types of police investigations: ordinary, and expedited (enquête de flagrance). The latter require certain special conditions to be met, and confer increased powers upon the police. Expedited and preliminary investigations share two features: they can take individuals into police custody for a period of 24 hours (garde à vue), renewable once; or four days for terrorism and drugs, and they are obliged to issue reports (procès-verbaux) to the public prosecutor, who makes the decision whether to carry on with the process based on their own discretion.

In both types of investigation, police have recourse to § garde à vue.

==== Expedited ====
An expedited investigation (enquête de flagrance) is the most frequent type of police investigation, and can be carried out if suspects are caught red-handed (flagrant délit), or in a private home when committing the crime, or in possession of incriminating evidence in the immediate aftermath of the crime. Police have increased powers in expedited investigations, including the power of search and seizure (perquisition, saisie) without the consent of the owner (with a few exceptions like diplomatic residences). Some locations require a search to be conducted by a judge, including doctor and attorney offices, offices of press and the media, and others. An expedited investigation can only be carried out for crimes and for délits.

==== Preliminary ====
When the conditions are not met for an expedited investigation, then preliminary investigation (enquête préliminaire; also "ordinary investigation") is carried out. In a preliminary investigation, police have only two coercive powers: to summon a witness to the police station for questioning, or to take a suspect into custody. (Note: Taking a suspect into custody is governed by CPP article 77, and is not the same as placing someone under arrest.) Search and seizure require the consent of the person involved, and there is no power of arrest. There is an exception in terrorism cases which may permit search and seizure in preliminary investigations, and requires sign-off by a judge of a tribunal de grande instance.

The investigations at this stage are carried out by the officers of the Judicial police (police judiciaire; OPJ), who operate under the supervision of the Public prosecutor's office.

=== Prosecution ===
Once the police investigation is completed, the dossier is forwarded to the public prosecutor's office. The public prosecutor is the magistrate in charge of the public prosecutor's office (Ministère Public). He receives complaints and reports, directs investigations, decides on prosecutions and ensures that the law is enforced. The victim may also apply directly to the public prosecutor's office.

At this point, the prosecutor has considerable discretion on whether to prosecute the case. The prosecutor may decide that there is insufficient evidence to continue, or that justice is best served by not proceeding. A check on this discretion, is that the victim has the right to summon the accused directly to appear before the court (citation directe}.

==== Prosecutorial discretion ====
The principle of opportunity to prosecute (opportunité des poursuites) belongs to the Public Prosecutor's Office. It is a power that is conferred by article 40-1 of the French Code of Criminal Procedure.

In France, the prosecutor has a lot of discretion on whether to take the case further, and the decision not to may be taken not only for weak cases, but even when the case is strong and the facts are certain, if the prosecutor judges that the common good is better served by not going further. The prosecutor may decide not to prosecute a case and instead to dismiss the charges.

This principle of prosecutorial discretion in France is more similar to what is seen in common law countries, and is distinguished from what happens in Germany, Italy, and Spain, where the decision to continue or not is based on the particulars of the case and must go forward if the circumstances require it. A unique feature of French law is that the victim can also make the decision to move forward with the case.

==== Alternatives ====
For two centuries, prosecutors in France faced one of two choices: prosecute, or drop the charges (classement sans suite). Recent reforms have introduced alternatives which may allow the prosecutor to avoid a trial and still serve justice.

Defendants in a criminal case cannot plead guilty. A defendant may confess to a crime, but this becomes one more piece of evidence that can be used against them. Plea bargaining as known in common law countries does not exist, but reduced penalties are possible at the prosecutor's discretion if the defendant confesses.

For less serious offenses (délits), the legislature introduced reforms to criminal procedure in the 1990s that permit the prosecutor to close a case if the perpetrator accepts an alternative procedure; this has become know informally as the "third way" (troisième voie). The alternative disposition may be one of several possibilities, such as community service, payment of a fine to the national treasury, or enrolling in a treatment program. The goal is to serve justice, while avoiding the hearings required in a formal trial. Other West European countries have very similar arrangements. If the perpetrator refuses an alternative procedure, then the case goes to trial.

=== Judicial investigation ===
In the second investigative phase, the in-depth judicial investigation (known in French as either instruction, or information judicaire) is carried out to see if there is enough evidence to warrant prosecution. The second part is normally carried out by the prosecutor (procureur), or in some serious cases, by the investigating judge.

An investigation carried out by the investigating judge (juge d'instruction; JI). Although this was formerly the model of how French criminal investigations were carried out, since various legal reforms took effect, investigations carried out by a JI compared to a procureur were less than 5% in 2003.

==== Investigating judge ====
An investigating judge initiates an investigation upon an order of the Public Prosecutor (procureur) or upon the request of a private citizen. The investigating judge may issue letters rogatory (commission rogatoire), order the seizure of necessary evidence, compel witnesses to appear and give evidence, and request expert testimony at an investigative hearing, the judge may have witnesses confront each other or the accused.

=== Trial ===
==== General characteristics ====
During the trial phase, the procedure becomes less inquisitorial, and more adversarial, in the sense that it becomes more oral, the parties may be present in person, and witnesses may be examined, although not cross-examined in the common law sense. However, the inquisitorial underpinnings are still there, and the judiciary takes an active role in the proceedings, with the President of the Court for directing it.

Trials are usually held in front of a panel of judges, but there are numerous exceptions, and in cases one judge may preside. The trial itself follows the adversarial system, with some aspects of the inquisitorial system mixed in, in accordance with the 1958 code of criminal procedure, and is public, oral, and hearing the parties involved. The hearing itself is oral, but focuses on the written investigation reports and evidence. In some cases, the written materials are sufficient to convict, in the absence of exculpatory evidence. In general, trials are public, but terrorist or rape trials may be held in private, and in some cases victims can request a private hearing. Public trials may not be recorded or filmed, but exceptions are made in cases of high importance such as that of Maurice Papon, convicted in 1998 of crimes against humanity during the Vichy regime of World War II.

The actual hearing may be divided into two parts, with the first part being a final investigation, including review of the preliminary investigation, augmented by hearing of witnesses and filling out any points not completed in the written report of the initial investigation. The second part is the closing argument phase, where the evidence is discussed and conclusions are made.

==== Order of trial ====
The hearing starts with the cross-examination of the defendant. Evidence is presented (reading of statements, hearing of witnesses and expert testimony). Defendants may question prosecution witnesses (or have them questioned), and may demand the summoning and questioning of defense witnesses under the same conditions as prosecution witnesses. When there is a partie civile associated with the case, that is, a claim by the victim for compensation for losses associated with the crime, then the civil case is heard next, and the amount of damages sought is specified. The closing arguments are last, with the prosecution going first and giving recommendations as to the desired sentence, followed by the defense attorney, and finally, the defendant has the option of making a closing statement. At the end of the session, the president of the trial notifies the parties of the date when the judgement of the court will be delivered.

==== Rights of the defendant ====
The accused has a right to a lawyer, (Note: Right to a lawyer: per European Commission of Human Rights art. 6-3; recognized by the Cour de Cassation, 30 June 1995 as being of constitutional force.) and certain parties are required to have one, including juveniles, and anyone with reduced mental capacity. The accused is presumed to be innocent, until there is a statement of guilt by the court, and the prosecution must prove the defendant is guilty, but the defendant must also prove the existence of a defense. There are a very few circumstances where defendants are presumed guilty and must prove innocence such as someone who lives with prostitutes, or with drug traffickers, is presumed to be living off the proceeds of illegal activity unless they can prove the contrary.

==== Absence of the defendant ====
Normally, the defendant must be present at their trial. If they don't appear, the trial goes on without them, and historically, without their attorney being able to act on their behalf. However, in 2001, this was held to be contrary to the European Convention on Human Rights, and since then, the attorney for the missing defendant must be heard by the court; this is known as défaut criminel. If they have not appeared before the conclusion of the trial, a warrant is issued for their arrest and they lose their right of appeal.

==== Pleading guilty ====
Historically, under France's inquisitorial system, there was no provision for pleading guilty. Even if a suspect confessed, the full investigation and trial procedure was carried out anyway; the confession merely became another piece of evidence for judges to consider. With backlogs in court schedules causing delays, the Truche Commission recommended judicial reforms including adopting some aspects of the adversarial system of common law legal systems including the possibility to accept a reduced sentence for certain crimes in exchange for a guilty plea, however the proposal was rejected. It was brought up again, and finally in 2004 a proposal was accepted for admitting a guilty plea for less serious crimes punishable by a fine or less than five years imprisonment. Suspects have a week to consider their course of action, and may discuss it with their attorney.

==== Evidence ====
All evidence legally obtained is admissible at trial. Mistreatment of a suspect can render evidence inadmissible unless authorities can prove the contrary. A defendant's past criminal history may be considered not only at sentencing but also at trial to determine guilt or innocence. (Note: Past criminal history as evidence: the Truche Commission has upheld this as providing judges with a fuller picture of the accused, although in the UK introducing past criminal history would be considered prejudicial to the defendant.) For certain major offenses, the court is provided with additional material on the personality, means, and family situation of the defendant, per article 81 of the code of criminal procedure.

==== Judgment ====
After the audience is over and the court has announced the date of the sentencing, the judge, or judges, retire to consider the case and render their judgment. Their decision is based on their personal sentiment, per articles 353 and 427 of the code. In the Ancien regime, judges were obliged to render decisions based on specific evidence presented, but this was abolished during the French Revolution because they considered it subject to prejudice, and a failure to consider individual circumstances. The judge can order an acquittal or a conviction, and the penalty may rise to life in prison (the death penalty was abolished in 1981). If the victim sought plaintiff damages and a conviction was obtained, then the judge may agree to award damages to the victim as civil party (partie civile).

== Actions ==
=== Garde à vue ===
Garde à vue is the term for the detention of a suspect in police custody during a police investigation. Normally, the detention lasts a maximum 24 hours. It is covered in article 62-2 of the French code of criminal procedure. Formerly, garde à vue applied to witnesses as well.

During a § Police investigation, police can take individuals into custody for a period of 24 hours. This allows police to bring suspects into custody, given certain conditions which must be met: a) persons brought into custody are suspected of a criminal offense; b) the investigator must immediately inform the prosecutor of the detention; and c) it may only last for 24 hours, renewable for another 24 (longer in case of terrorism); and d) the investigator must inform the suspect of his right to an attorney. Breach of any of these conditions is likely to result in a dismissal of charges by the judge. Police are obliged to issue reports (procès-verbaux) to the public prosecutor, who will make the decision whether to carry on with the process.

In 2009, there were 792,000 gardes à vue.

=== Reenactment ===
Police may create a reenactment (reconstitution) of a crime during the investigation phase of a criminal procedure.

=== Expert assistance ===
An expert may be called upon in criminal cases, who then carries out their task under the supervision of the investigating judge. Calling of an expert (expertise is an exclusive prerogative of the judge.

== See also ==
- Belgian Code of Criminal Procedure
- Code of Offences and Penalties
- Codification (law)
- Cour d'appel (Appellate court)
- Court of Appeal (France)
- Court of Cassation (France)
- Criminal Code (Canada)
- Criminal justice system of France
- Criminal responsibility in French law
- Declaration of the Rights of Man and of the Citizen
- French criminal code
- Glossary of French criminal law
- International Covenant on Civil and Political Rights
- Law enforcement in France
- Law of France
- Napoleonic Code – civil, not criminal
- Nulla poena sine lege
- Prosecutorial discretion

== Works cited ==
- John Bell; Sophie Boyron; Simon Whittaker (27 March 2008). Principles of French Law (2 ed.). OUP Oxford. ISBN 978-0-19-101889-3. OCLC 865331945.
- Bermann, George A.; Picard, Etienne, eds. (1 January 2008). Introduction to French Law. Kluwer Law. ISBN 978-90-411-2466-1. OCLC 219574344.
- Cairns, Walter; McKeon, Robert C.; McKeon, Robert (1995). Introduction to French Law. Cavendish. ISBN 978-1-85941-112-4. OCLC 246842627.
- Chambers's Encyclopaedia: A Dictionary of Universal Knowledge, Volume 8. W. & R. Chambers, Limited. 1896. pp. 286–. OCLC 235817290.
- Champion, Dean J. (2008). Sentencing: A Reference Handbook. ABC-CLIO. ISBN 978-1-59884-087-2. OCLC 1151269945.
- Donnelly, Daniel (21 January 2013). Municipal Policing in the European Union: Comparative Perspectives. Springer. pp. 37–. ISBN 978-1-137-29061-8. OCLC 1005811336.
- Doucet, Jean-Paul (11 April 2019). "Dictionnaire de droit criminel" [Dictionary of Criminal Law] (in French). Archived from the original on 7 January 2023.
- Elliott, Catherine (2001). French Criminal Law. Portland OR: Willan. ISBN 978-1-135-99307-8. OCLC 49494876.
- Elliott, Catherine; Jeanpierre, Eric; Vernon, Catherine (2006). French Legal System (Second ed.). Harlow, England: Pearson/Longman. ISBN 978-1-4058-1161-3. OCLC 70107160.
- Garé, Thierry; Ginestet, Catherine (September 2022). Droit pénal. Procédure pénale 2023 [Criminal law. criminal procedure 2023]. HyperCours (in French) (14 ed.). Paris: Editions Dalloz. ISBN 978-2-247-22075-5. OCLC 1346591522. p. pub. blurb: "Le droit pénal général étudie les principes généraux de la répression des infractions, la responsabilité et la peine. La procédure pénale régit le déroulement du procès pénal. Ces droits doivent assurer à la société une protection suffisante, sans sacrifier les libertés individuelles." [General criminal law deals with the general principles of punishment, liability and sentencing. Criminal procedure governs the conduct of criminal trials.]
- Hodgson, Jacqueline (8 November 2005). French Criminal Justice: A Comparative Account of the Investigation and Prosecution of Crime in France. Bloomsbury Publishing. ISBN 978-1-84731-069-9. OCLC 1048749661.
- Hodgson, Jacqueline; Soubise, Laurène (21 June 2016). "Understanding the sentencing process in France". Crime and Justice. 45 (1). Univ. of Chicago: 221–265. doi:10.1086/685538. ISSN 0192-3234. OCLC 6914375713.
- French Ministry of Justice (2023). "Lexique | Justice.fr" [Glossary | Justice.fr]. Ministère de la Justice (in French).
- Larnaude, Ferdinand (1915). "VII. Le droit criminel (droit pénal et instruction criminelle [Vii. Criminal law (penal law and criminal judicial investigation]". La Science Francaise | Les sciences juridiques et politiques [French Science | Juridical and political science]. Paris: Larousse. OCLC 575741811.
- République française; Secrétariat général du gouvernement (19 October 2022). "Légifrance Le service public de la diffusion du droit" [The public service for dissemination of the law]. Légifrance. Direction de l'information légale et administrative. ISSN 2270-8987. OCLC 867599055.
- Leruth, Michael F. (18 October 2022). Modern France. ABC-CLIO. pp. 100–. ISBN 978-1-4408-5549-8.
- French Ministry of Justice (9 December 2008). "Justice | Portail | La garde à vue" [Justice | Portal | Police custody]. Ministère de la Justice (in French). [Police custody is the situation in which a person, suspected of having committed or attempted to commit an offense punishable by imprisonment, is held by the police or gendarmerie as part of a judicial investigation. It is a measure that deprives a person of liberty for a strictly limited period of time.]
- French Ministry of Justice (6 August 2008). "Les mots-clés de la Justice - Lexique" [Key words of Justice - Lexicon]. Ministère de la Justice (in French). Archived from the original on 31 March 2023.
- Ministère de l'Intérieur (10 October 2011). "Histoire de la police judiciaire | Direction Centrale de la Police Judiciaire | Organisation - Police nationale" [History of the judicial police | Central Directorate of the Judicial Police | Organization - National Police] (in French).
- Terrill, Richard J. (2009). World Criminal Justice Systems: A Survey (7 ed.). New Providence, NJ: Lexis Nexis. ISBN 978-1-59345-612-2. OCLC 430736627.
- Badinter, Robert (2010). "Promulgation du Code pénal" [Promulgation of the Penal Code]. francearchives.fr (in French). Archived from the original on 2 January 2016.
- Dadomo, Christian; Farran, Susan (1996) [1st pub. 1993]. The French Legal System. London: Sweet & Maxwell. ISBN 9780421539709. OCLC 36246159.
- Direction de l'information légale et administrative [in French] (17 March 2023). "Information judiciaire" [Judicial investigation]. Service-Public.fr. DILA.
- The Editors of Encyclopaedia (26 April 2002). "juge d'instruction". Encyclopædia Britannica.
- Garraud, René (1909). "Traité théorique et pratique d'instruction criminelle et de procédure pénale" [Theoretical and practical treatise on criminal and investigation] (in French). Paris: 61644113. OCLC 61644113.
- Giacopelli, Muriel (2012). "Les procédures alternatives aux poursuites. Essai de théorie générale" [Alternativs to prosecution. An attempt at general theory]. Revue de science criminelle et de droit pénal comparé (in French). 3 (3): 505–521. doi:10.3917/rsc.1203.0505.
- le Premier Ministre (12 October 2010). Ētude d’impact Projet de loi relatif a la garde a vue [Impact study Draft law on police custody]. Paris: Assemblée Nationale. 1.1 Les modalités actuelles du placement en garde à vue.
