= Judicial police (France) =

Police responsible for criminal investigations

The judicial police in France are responsible for the investigation of criminal offenses and identification of perpetrators. This is in contrast to the administrative police, whose goal is to ensure the maintenance of public order and to prevent crime. Article 14 of the French Code of Criminal Procedure provides the legal basis for the authority of the Judicial police.

The separation of administrative and judicial policing functions dates to the 1795 Code of Offences and Penalties, and is still in force today. It is a functional distinction, which does not necessarily imply an organizational separation: a single organization may be charged with carrying out both types of police functions: one example is the National Gendarmerie.

== History ==
=== Origins ===
The judicial police was formed by Georges Clemenceau, who was Minister of the Interior, in order to create a "police force responsible for assisting the judicial authority in the repression of crimes and misdemeanors".

During the Belle Époque, under the Third Republic, the French government was under increasing political pressure to do something about the rising level of insecurity, due to the rise of organized, marauding bands of brigands operating in various regions almost with impunity in the face of dispersed and poorly trained municipal police, and insufficient numbers of national police. This came to a head in the first decade of the 20th century, when organized criminal gangs pillaged, murdered, and tortured victims in several departments of France.

In response, Clemenceau issued a decree dated 4 March 1907 which created a structure under the command of Commissioner Jules Sébille, who was the first head of the French judicial police. This was followed by another decree in December which established twelve regional brigades around the country, dedicated to fighting organized crime.

=== Early success ===
By 1909, there were some early successes, with 2,700 arrests, including for 65 murders, and various rapists, fraudsters, counterfeiters, and burglars. By 1910, however, automobiles had entered the scene. Clemenceau organized the national police in part as rapid reaction units in order to combat the increasing sophistication of gangs who took advantage of improvement in communications for better means of escape; the scattered and unconnected municipal police authorities were structurally handicapped. There was some reorganization of regional brigades, and expansion to 15 regional centers in 1911.

=== Interwar period ===
During the First World War, there was a focus on counterespionage, including the Mata Hari affair. There was additional restructuring after the war which resulted by 1924 in 16 brigades, 85 commissioners, and 290 inspectors. In order to better cooperate with other countries in Europe in combatting crime in France, new regulations were instituted in 1928 naming the judicial police as the agency representing France in the precusor of Interpol. In 1929, the first central office of the judicial police was created, in order to fight against counterfeiting (Office central pour la répression du faux monnayage; O.C.R.F.M.). This period also marked the involvement of the mobile brigade in the resolution of sensational cases such as the swindler Clément Passal in 1929, the Stavisky affair in 1933, and of the serial killer Eugen Weidmann in 1937.

=== World War II ===
In 1941, reforms in the management of the national police under the Vichy regime reshuffled the Judicial police (at that time, the Service de police judiciaire) and merged the regional mobile brigades with the security forces, which took on the name "Regional Judicial Police Services" (Services régionaux de police judiciaire, SRPJ). These reforms were undone in 1946 after the Liberation, when the judicial police became part of the Sécurité Publique, and the SRPJ became regional mobile police brigades. That lasted only a year, and in 1947 the regional judicial police services were reestablished with 17 offices around the country.

=== Post-war period ===
A number of violent crime gangs formed in the post-war period, forcing the Judicial police to adapt, with the creation of anti-gang task forces called GRBs (groupe de répression du banditisme) in 1949. This period was marked by the arrest of gang leaders such as Pierre Loutrel, better known as "Pierrot le fou" ("Crazy Pete") in 1948, and Émile Buisson, "the slippery one" (l'insaisissable) in 1950, the theft of jewels of the Begum Aga Khan in Nice in 1949, the Dominici affair in 1952, and the Eric Peugeot kidnapping case in 1960.

The Law of 9 July 1966 pushed by de Gaulle established a national police force in France, and created the Central Directorate of the Judicial Police (D.C.P.J.) to oversee the 18 regional offices, and in 1969 the network was extended by the creation of branches and detachments which operated under the regional offices.

== Cultural references ==
Belgian novelist Georges Simenon created Jules Maigret, Chief Inspector of the criminal brigade of the judicial police, as the central character of his series of 75 works of detective fiction. The novels and stories were published between 1930 and 1972. The series eventually sold 500 million copies. They have been translated into more than 50 languages, and adapted for film, television, and radio.

== See also ==
- Codification (law)
- Cour d'appel
- Court of Appeal (France)
- Court of Cassation
- Criminal justice system of France
- Declaration of the Rights of Man and of the Citizen
- French penal code
- Law of France
- Napoleonic Code – civil, not criminal
- Nulla poena sine lege
- Principle of legality in French criminal law

== Works cited ==
- John Bell; Sophie Boyron; Simon Whittaker (27 March 2008). Principles of French Law (2 ed.). OUP Oxford. ISBN 978-0-19-101889-3. OCLC 865331945.
- Chambers's Encyclopaedia: A Dictionary of Universal Knowledge, Volume 8. W. & R. Chambers, Limited. 1896. pp. 286–. OCLC 235817290.
- Donnelly, Daniel (21 January 2013). Municipal Policing in the European Union: Comparative Perspectives. Springer. pp. 37–. ISBN 978-1-137-29061-8. OCLC 1005811336.
- République française; Secrétariat général du gouvernement (19 October 2022). "Légifrance Le service public de la diffusion du droit" [The public service for dissemination of the law]. Légifrance. Direction de l'information légale et administrative. ISSN 2270-8987. OCLC 867599055.
- Ministère de l'Intérieur (10 October 2011). "Histoire de la police judiciaire | Direction Centrale de la Police Judiciaire | Organisation - Police nationale" [History of the judicial police | Central Directorate of the Judicial Police | Organization - National Police] (in French).
