= Public action in French law =

A criminal proceeding in French law (French: action publique, lit. 'public action') is one carried out in the name of society against a person accused of a criminal offense by applying the French penal code. It is taken in the name of society, in that its goal is to stop disruption of public order, and not to abate personal damages done to a specific person, which is governed by French civil law.

The proceeding is undertaken by the Public Prosecutor's Office (Ministère public), against perpetrators or accomplices accused of an infraction.

The term action publique is defined in Article 1 of the code of criminal procedure.

== Terminology ==
The term action publique is translated in various ways in English sources, depending on context. The literal, word-for-word translation is "public action", which is used sometimes in English texts, always with an explanation, as it has little meaning outside the context of French law. What the term action publique actually refers to is "criminal proceedings", or "public prosecution".

The term public in this expression is used in the same sense as in the public prosecutor (procureur) who is responsible for prosecutions carried out on behalf of society (i.e., the public), and thus the term procureur is generally rendered in English as "public prosecutor", or generically as the "public prosecutor's office". Equivalent terms for procureur are parquet, as well as Ministère public, rendered in English sources sometimes as "Public ministry", and sometimes left in the original French.

== Initiation of criminal proceedings ==
Initiating a criminal proceeding (French: mise en mouvement de l'action publique) is the follow-up to the commission an offense by introducing it into the jurisdictional phase of criminal proceedings.

The entity responsible for initiating a criminal proceeding in France is usually the Public Prosecutor's Office (Ministère public), a hierarchical corps of magistrates charged with carrying out the prosecutions. Alongside them, other civil servants are, for certain infractions, empowered to begin other proceedings, notably for indirect taxes, and for the Corps of Bridges, Waters and Forests. The victim of a crime may also initiate the proceeding.

The object of the prosecution, is the accused perpetrator of the infraction, against whom the criminal proceeding is brought. The defendants are the accused perpetrators and accomplices of the infraction. They must be identifiable, although not necessarily identified, for the criminal proceeding to begin.

The public prosecutor receives complaints and decides how to proceed. After receiving a complaint, they may decide to prosecute, or to resort to an alternative procedure, such a warning, referral to a professional health or social structure, reparation of the damage, or other alternatives, or may decide not to prosecute.

If prosecution moves forward, the victim or complainant is informed, and in criminal matters (Note: Criminal matters: this term involves offenses which are crimes or délits, but not contraventions (minor offenses) like traffic violations.) the prosecutor requests the opening of an investigation (instruction) by means of an opening indictment (réquisitoire introductif) against a named person (or against a John Doe defendant: plainte contre X,) stating the facts that are the subject of the prosecution and the penal code item that applies to it. The prosecutor may either refer the case to the investigating court by way of an introductory indictment (réquisitoire introductif), or refer it directly to the trial court by direct summons (citation directe or other method. For non-criminal offenses such as traffic violations, the prosecutor can use the simplified ordonnance pénale procedure. For middling offenses punishable by a fine or less than five years imprisonment, the prosecutor may use the CRPC procedure, (Note: CRPC: (comparution sur reconnaissance préalable de culpabilité) – somewhat akin to a plea bargain, that offers a perpetrator a reduced sentence fixed by law in return for a statement of guilt.) and for minor offenses, the prosecutor can opt either to initiate an investigation as for other offenses, or to issue a warning or a direct summons (citation directe).

== Works cited ==
- Bermann, George A.; Picard, Etienne, eds. (1 January 2008). Introduction to French Law. Kluwer Law. ISBN 978-90-411-2466-1. OCLC 219574344.
- Cairns, Walter; McKeon, Robert C.; McKeon, Robert (1995). Introduction to French Law. Cavendish. ISBN 978-1-85941-112-4. OCLC 246842627.
- "Action publique - Fiches d'orientation" [Action publique - Fact sheets]. Dalloz (in French). Paris: Editions Dalloz. "L'action publique est l'action en justice portée devant une juridiction répressive pour l'application des peines à l'auteur d'une infraction. Même si elle peut être mise en mouvement par la partie civile, elle est toujours exercée par les magistrats ou par les fonctionnaires auxquels elle est confiée par la loi." [Action publique is the legal action brought before a criminal court for the application of penalties to the perpetrator of an offense. It may also be initiated by a civil party to a criminal case, but it is always exercised by the magistrates or by the civil servants to whom it is entrusted by law.]
- Elliott, Catherine (2001). French Criminal Law. Portland OR: Willan. ISBN 978-1-135-99307-8. OCLC 49494876.
- Hodgson, Jacqueline (8 November 2005). French Criminal Justice: A Comparative Account of the Investigation and Prosecution of Crime in France. Bloomsbury Publishing. ISBN 978-1-84731-069-9. OCLC 1048749661.
- République française; Secrétariat général du gouvernement (19 October 2022). "Légifrance Le service public de la diffusion du droit" [The public service for dissemination of the law]. Légifrance. Direction de l'information légale et administrative. ISSN 2270-8987. OCLC 867599055.
