= Principle of legality in French criminal law =

French legal principle

The principle of legality in French criminal law holds that no one may be convicted of a criminal offense unless a previously published legal text sets out in clear and precise wording the constituent elements of the offense and the penalty which applies to it. (Latin:Nullum crimen, nulla pœna sine lege, in other words, "no crime, no penalty, without a law").

The principle of legality (Note: The principle of legality (principe de légalité) states that no one may be convicted and sentenced without a clear and precise law; that is, "no crime, no punishment, without a law". Portions go back to ancient times, and it was eventually reconceptualized during the Enlightenment, first by Cesare Beccaria, and then by Montesquieu in 1748. As a legal precept in France, it is known as the "principle of legality in French criminal law" (Principe de légalité en droit pénal français).) (French: principe de légalité) is one of the most fundamental principles of French criminal law, and goes back to the Penal Code of 1791 adopted during the French Revolution, and before that, was developed by Italian criminologist Cesare Beccaria and by Montesquieu. The principle has its origins in the 1789 Declaration of the Rights of Man and of the Citizen, which endows it with constitutional force and limits the conditions in which citizens may be punished for infractions.

== History ==
The principle of legality of punishment and crime was identified and conceptualized in the Enlightenment. It is generally attributed to Cesare Beccaria but Montesquieu indicated that "the judges of the Nation are only the mouth that pronounces the words of the law" (Note: "Les juges de la Nation ne sont que la bouche qui prononce les paroles de la loi.; in The Spirit of Law, book XI, ch. VI, On the English Constitution).) as early as 1748, in The Spirit of the Law (French: L'Esprit des lois).

It appears in particular in article 8 of the Declaration of the Rights of Man and of the Citizen of 1789, and is thus invested with constitutional force, as confirmed several times by the Constitutional Council, such as on 20 January 1981 concerning the Law of Security and Freedom.

The principle of legality was initially understood as a guarantee against the arbitrariness of judicial power: "God forbid that the Parliaments should be fair". (Note: "Dieu nous protège de l'équité des parlements.") (it being understood that at the time, that parliaments were jurisdictional bodies). This principle was affirmed during the French Revolution.

The principle of legality gives the power to define the components of offenses and to establish their penalties to the parliament. This attribution corresponds to the faith placed in the power of the parliament by the revolutionaries, since the parliament, expressing the will of the people, can do no wrong. It is the Parliament to which the safeguarding of liberties must be entrusted. This vision differs markedly from the Anglo-Saxon approach, and more particularly the North American one, in which the judge is perceived as the protector of citizens against state power and its tyrannical excesses.

== Constitutional force ==
The concept of punishment for offenses has its origins in France in the Declaration of the Rights of Man, article 8. The Declaration is recognized in the Preamble to the French Constitution, and is invested with constitutional power, due to the 1971 Liberty of Association decision of the Constitutional Council, which said:

No one may be punished except by virtue of a law established and promulgated prior to the offence and legally applied. (Note: Nul ne peut être puni qu'en vertu d'une loi établie et promulguée antérieurement au délit, et légalement appliquée.)

The Constitutional Council stated that it follows from these provisions that the legislator is obliged to define the offences in terms sufficiently clear and precise to exclude arbitrariness.

The legislative application of the principle is found in Article 111-3 of the Criminal code which states:

No person may be punished for a felony or misdemeanor whose elements are not defined by law, or for a contravention whose elements are not defined by regulation. (Note: "Nul ne peut être puni pour un crime ou pour un délit dont les éléments ne sont pas définis par la loi, ou pour une contravention dont les éléments ne sont pas définis par le règlement.")

No person may be punished by a penalty which is not provided for by law, if the offense is a felony or a misdemeanour, or by regulation, if the offence is a contravention. (Note: "Nul ne peut être puni d'une peine qui n'est pas prévue par la loi, si l'infraction est un crime ou un délit, ou par le règlement, si l'infraction est une contravention.")

== Division of authority ==
The legal framework established by the Revolution put the parlement in charge of all three types of offenses, but this later changed. Now the parliament retains control of the two most serious types of offense, crimes and délits, but contraventions have become a regulatory matter handled by the executive, as discussed in the first chapter of the code, article 111–2.

== Application in time and space ==
The principle of criminal liability is defined in the constitution, and a fundamental corollary of it is its application in time (application de la loi pénale dans le temps). This principle means that criminal sanctions are not retroactive, per article 112-1 of the French penal code. This article also discusses the disposition of cases where acts were committed around the time a new law was taking effect.

== International protections for the principle of legality ==
The principle of legality has spread and has received a certain recognition at the international with a more or less effective judicial sanction.

=== United Nations ===
The principle is stated in Article 11, paragraph 2 of the Universal Declaration of Human Rights of 1948:

No one shall be held guilty of any penal offence on account of any act or omission which did not constitute a penal offence, under national or international law, at the time when it was committed. Nor shall a heavier penalty be imposed than the one that was applicable at the time the penal offence was committed.

Nonetheless, it is not a legally binding text: it therefore cannot be invoked in the national or international jurisdictions of States which have signed the Universal Declaration. This is not the case with the International Covenant on Civil and Political Rights (ICCPR):

No one shall be held guilty of any criminal offence on account of any act or omission which did not constitute a criminal offence, under national or international law, at the time when it was committed. Nor shall a heavier penalty be imposed than the one that was applicable at the time when the criminal offence was committed.

Still, this judicial instrument leaves considerable leeway to the judge of that country, and the United Nations Human Rights Committee, is not recognized as a jurisdiction whose decisions are binding on individual States. The interpretation of this pact, and thus of the principle of legality as it is enshrined in it, is therefore a function of the interpretation of the national judge, in the case of signatory states.

=== European Convention on Human Rights ===
The Convention is the only international human rights treaty whose judicial effect is guaranteed by an independent jurisdiction, the European Court of Human Rights. Article 7, §1 of the Convention enunciates thus the principle of legality in criminal matters:

No one shall be held guilty of any criminal offence on account of any act or omission which did not constitute a criminal offence under national or international law at the time when it was committed. Nor shall a heavier penalty be imposed than the one that was applicable at the time the criminal offence was committed.

— European Convention on Human Rights, Article 7 § 1

This provision refers to "national law" rather than to "national legislation" (in the formal and strict sense of the word), to remain compatible with common law legal systems. The European Court of Human Rights only has jurisdiction if the national legal system has already ruled: it may however have an independent interpretation of the Convention and notably determine what it considers a criminal matter. The European judicial system may of its own accord qualify a matter as criminal, based on the nature of its penalty or on its gravity. Thus, in countries with dual legal jurisdictions, such as France, administrative authorities empowered by the legislature to impose administrative penalties may see themselves applying Article 7.

However, the Convention expresses a reservation as to crimes against humanity.

This Article shall not prejudice the trial and punishment of any person for any act or omission which, at the time when it was committed, was criminal according to the general principles of law recognised by civilised nations.

At the time they were committed, such crimes were not made illegal by a criminal law text. The need to punish the authors of crimes was thus expressed from respect for the "general principles of law recognized by civilized nations", thus tempering the principle of legality enshrined in the Convention.

== See also ==
- Nulla poena sine lege
- Ex post facto law
- Principle of legality in criminal law

== Works cited ==
- République française; Secrétariat général du gouvernement (19 October 2022). "Légifrance Le service public de la diffusion du droit" [The public service for dissemination of the law]. Légifrance. Direction de l'information légale et administrative. ISSN 2270-8987. OCLC 867599055.
