= French criminal law =

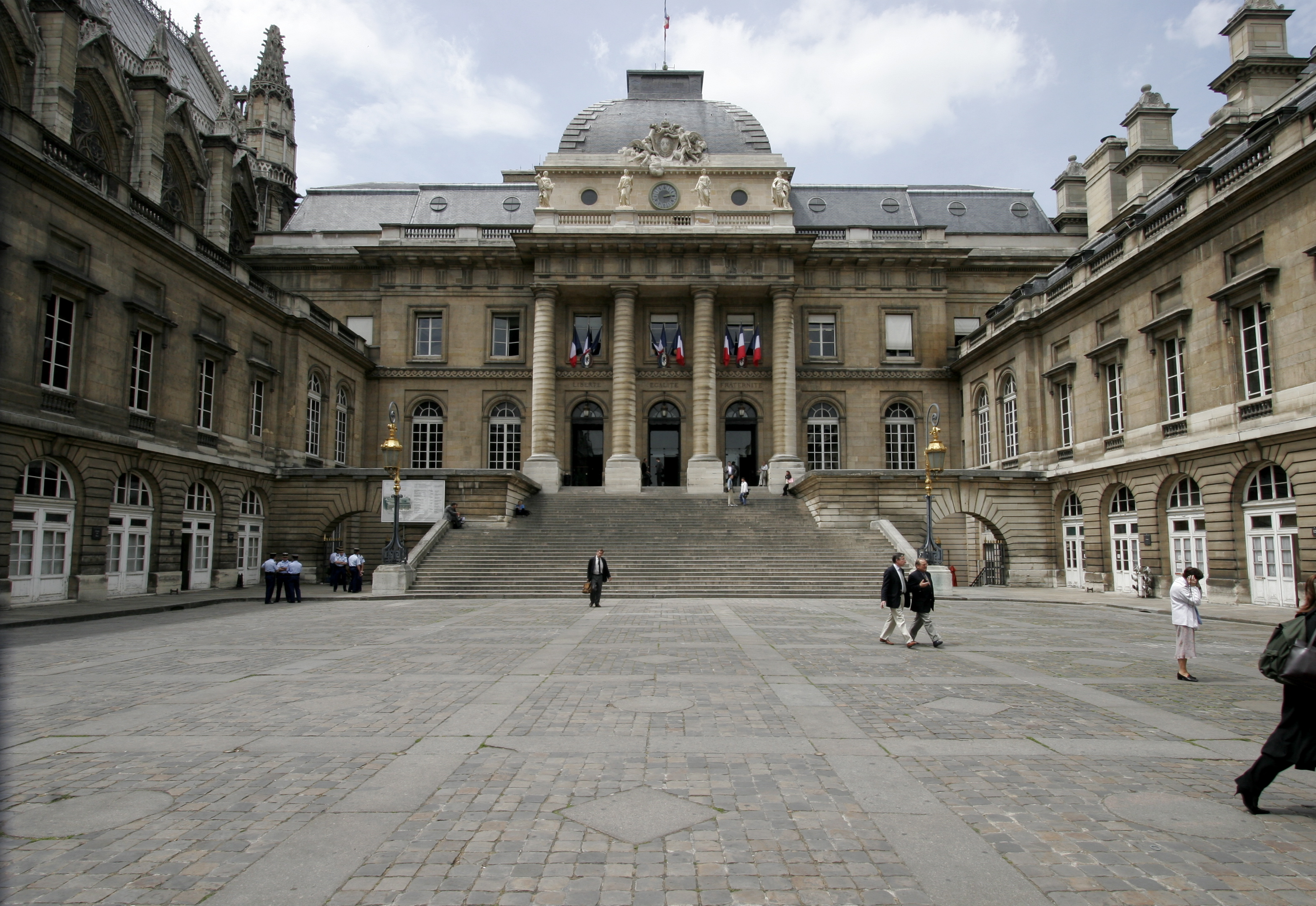
Courtyard of the Palais de Justice, Paris showing the old High Court of Paris, the Court of Appeals, and the Court of Cassation

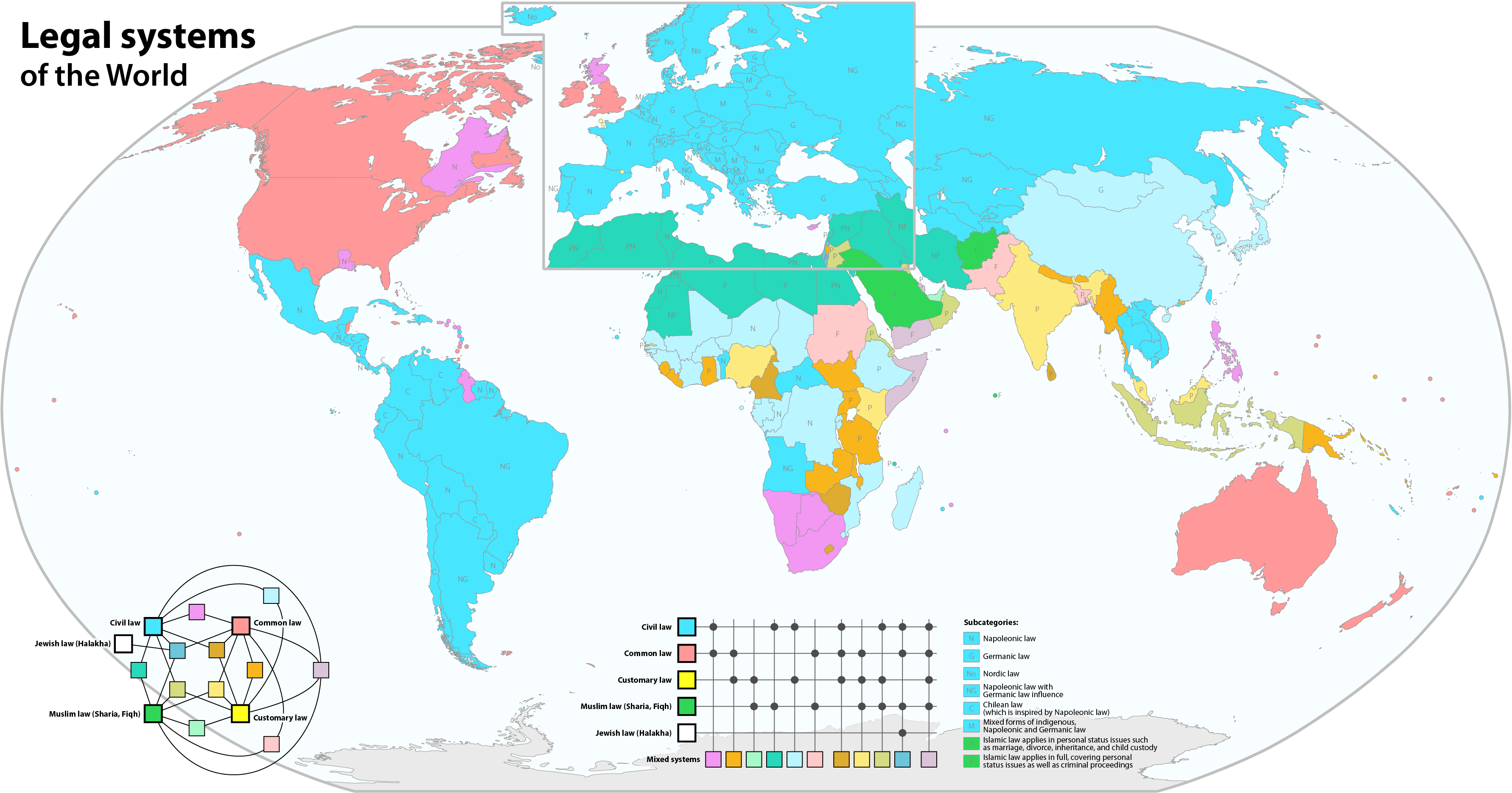
Legal systems of the world: countries in blue have Napoleonic law or a variant.

French criminal law is "the set of legal rules that govern the State's response to offenses and offenders". It is one of the branches of the juridical system of the French Republic. The field of criminal law is defined as a sector of French law, and is a combination of public and private law, insofar as it punishes private behavior on behalf of society as a whole. Its function is to define, categorize, prevent, and punish criminal offenses committed by a person, whether a natural person (Personne physique) or a legal person (Personne morale). In this sense it is of a punitive nature, as opposed to civil law in France, which settles disputes between individuals, or administrative law which deals with issues between individuals and government.

Criminal offenses are divided into three categories, according to increasing severity: contraventions, délits, (Note: Délit is sometimes translated as felony in English sources, but this is not quite accurate, as a crime is also a felony. It should be particularly noted that the English word delict is a term from civil law not criminal law, and in common law systems, and thus is not a valid translation for the French délit.) and crimes. (Note: Crime – Because of the three-way division of French infractions, this is not an exact synonym of the English word with the same spelling, as a crime involves only infractions punishable by a sentence of three years or more. The English word crime" thus overlaps the meanings of both French terms crime, as well as délit.) The last two categories are determined by the legislature, while contraventions are the responsibility of the executive branch. This tripartite division is matched by the courts responsible for enforcing criminal law: the police tribunal for infractions; the Correctional court for délits; the cour d'assises for crimes. Criminal law is carried out within the rules of French criminal procedure which set the conditions under which police investigations, judicial inquiries and judgements are carried out.

Like the legal systems of other liberal democracies, French criminal law is based on three guiding principles: the principle of legality in criminal law, an illegal act (actus reus), and intent (mens rea). It has been influenced by various legal, ethical, and scientific philosophical movements over the centuries. While most of these influences are national in origin, European courts (such as the Court of Justice of the European Union and the European Court of Human Rights) have also influenced French criminal law. French criminal law was first codified during the French Revolution, resulting in the French Penal Code of 1791. Under the First Empire, Napoleon enacted the Penal Code of 1810, replaced by the French penal code of 1994.

The public prosecutor and his staff are responsible for the pursuit of legal proceedings and criminal prosecution, in collaboration with the police. To determine the offense, the judge must have a preexisting legal basis (préalable légal), a material element, (actus reus) and a moral element (mens rea). The offense can only be charged if the perpetrator is mentally competent, and has consented to the commission of a criminal act (as perpetrator or accomplice) of their own free will. If the offense is attributed to a perpetrator, they are liable to legal punishment, which may be aggravated or mitigated according to the circumstances. The judicial authority pronounces a sentence according to the severity of the acts: imprisonment or detention, (Note: Imprisonment – Three terms in French with very similar meanings all translate to imprisonment in English: emprisonnement, réclusion and détention. The word emprisonnement is a generic term, and means the same as its cognate in English in the normal sense, that is, to be deprived of one's liberty by being held in a prison. The other two words have specific meanings defined in the penal code which are nearly identical: both réclusion and détention mean to be imprisoned for a fixed term of at least ten and at most thirty years (more than that, and it's called réclusion a perpétuité because there is no fixed prison term exceeding 30 years). The difference between the two is not the sentence, but the crime involved: if you are convicted of a political crime, the sentence is called détention criminelle, and if for any other type of infraction other than a political crime, it's called réclusion criminelle, even if the two sentences are otherwise identical.) fine, conditional sentencing, community service, day-fine, (Note: Day-fine – from French jour-amende, literally, "day-fine"; alias fine-day, penalty-unit, punishment-unit, et al. When a délit is punished with a sentence of imprisonment, the judge can declare a day-fine punishment of up to 1,000 Euros per day for a maximum of 360 days per article 131-5.) and so on. The convicted person may appeal the decision to the court of appeal, and, ultimately, to the Court of Cassation.

== Background ==
=== Dual systems ===
Schema showing jurisdictional dualism in the French legal system

France has a dual system of law: one system deals with private relationships, and is sometimes called "private law" (droit privé) or "ordinary law" (droit commun), and the other system which covers administrative officials, and is called "administrative law" (droit administratif). This duality is not merely or mainly about covering different domains or legal topics, and in fact, the two systems overlap and deal with some of the same or similar topics. Rather, the duality is about the fact that the authorities which enforce them and which also develop their content are completely autonomous and independent of each other.

The two systems have entirely separate judges, courts, and bodies of written texts which support them, and are known in French as "orders": the "judiciary order" (ordre judiciaire) for private law, and the "administrative order" (ordre administrative) for public law. This separation came about during the French Revolution, when the justice system was established respecting a strict separation of powers in the law of 16–24 August 1790 in particular, article 13. (Note: "The functions of the courts shall be distinct, and shall at all times remain separate from the functions of the administration. The courts may not in any way, on penalty of committing an offence, disturb the functioning of the administrative authorities, nor may they summons [sic] any administrative official to appear before them by reason of the pursuance of their duties.")

==== Administrative order ====
The administrative order has jurisdiction (compétence) over cases between the state and public organizations, as well as between individuals and the public organs of government, and thus stands apart from the criminal law system, which is part of the judiciary order.

==== Judiciary order ====
The judiciary system or order, is also known as "ordinary law" (juridictions de l'ordre judiciaire) and is further divided into two branches: civil law and criminal law.

The main function of criminal law is punishment for infractions, while the main function of civil law is compensation for damages. The main differences are that criminal law seeks to punish or penalize when an infraction against existing law is committed, and is "vertical" in the sense that it comes from the government down towards an individual or legal entity; whereas civil law establishes a horizontal framework among members of society, and seeks to facilitate reparation of damages caused by one member of society towards another.

Civil and criminal law come together in certain cases, such as civil procedures which involve a criminal aspect. Although the goal of civil law is to compensate a victim via the awarding of damages, damages can have occurred during the commission of a criminal offense. Article 2 of the French penal code addresses this situation, and offers victims the option of suing for damages via a civil action in the criminal courts.

The two branches, civil and criminal, are mirrored in the types of actions a person or official may take in an attempt to right wrongs, namely civil action (action civile) in the case of civil law, and public action (action publique) in the case of criminal law. In a civil matter, someone who feels they are a victim of another member of society may identify themselves as a victim to judicial authorities, and seek compensation from the perpetrator. A criminal matter is dealt with by a public action (action publique) to punish the perpetrator. In particular, it is up to the public prosecutor to initiate this action on behalf of the public, and to seek punishment for the accused, rather than reparations.

== History ==
The Republic of France has had three penal codes: the code of 1791, the code of 1810, and the code of 1994, still in effect as of 2022.

=== Precursors ===
The origins of criminal law go back to family justice, retribution for perceived offenses, and revenge. Private revenge was originally a way of maintaining a rough sort of social order among clans, with fear of revenge the deterrent factor. This created a certain respect for strangers and other clans, and when a settling of accounts was necessary, this could take place not only against a presumed perpetrator, but also against their family, the clan chief, or top clan members, so that criminal liability was originally collective and not individual.

With the Fall of the Roman Empire officials in charge of police disappeared. With the rise of feudalism in France, policing powers were dispersed among a multitude of seigneurs. Lords of their fiefs, they were all-powerful, including that of justice among the peasants they controlled.

As states evolved and gained power, private justice receded; the State was only involved insofar as procedural control of private revenge, to control excesses. France was influenced by the texts of Roman justice which were still available and studied, and by the thirteenth century, the state started to become more involved, and the previous system of private justice evolved into public justice, with the State assuming the power of suppression, targeting social wrongs rather than individual, private ones, in which private victims or plaintiffs (Note: Known as the partie civile) became secondary to the state's role.

These private and public systems coexisted for a while. A crime could be seen as the failure of a monarch to keep the oath he took upon accession, to maintain peace in the kingdom, which justified the interest in public repression of crime, if the individuals concerned could not do so privately. By the sixteenth century, individuals sometimes had to seek permission from the monarch to engage in self-defense. This has further evolved today, to the point where self-defense is still permitted if one is in immediate danger, otherwise, it is allocated to the authorities. Revenge was no longer permitted to individuals, but appropriated by the monarch, based on their divine power.

=== Suspension of trial by ordeal ===
In medieval France and elsewhere in Europe, trial by ordeal was an ancient judicial practice by which the guilt or innocence of an accused was determined, such as trial by battle, by fire, or water. The belief was that God determined the result, and presentation of evidence or witnesses played no part. This persisted for centuries, because people believed it worked, and there was no one (except the victim and the real perpetrator, who would remain silent) to say it did not. But by the 12th century belief in it began to weaken, led by opposing views from the Church. Opposition became widespread, and in 1215 the Church condemned trial by ordeal in the Fourth Lateran Council. This meant priests could no longer use trial by ordeal to determine guilt or innocence, and other means had to be found. (Note: In non-ecclesiastical settings, trial by ordeal continued on before being discontinued during the fourteenth and fifteenth centuries, although they experienced a resurgence in the sixteenth and seventeenth centuries in the form of witch hunts.)

The Church already had one other method, which hitherto had been used only for cases of offenses against the clergy, and for cases of suspected heresy, namely they would organize a commission of inquiry headed by some trustworthy individual to find out the facts. The investigator would question suspects and witnesses and write up a report. The ruling on guilt or innocence would be based on the written dossier. This formal investigation, or "inquisition", is the basis of the inquisitorial system in France. England took a different approach, summoning a group of people to answer the question of guilt or innocence formerly assigned to God, and this became the origin of trial by jury and the accusatorial system.

=== Church ===
Development of the French criminal justice system has important roots in ecclesiastical law of the Roman Catholic Church. While England was moving towards the adversarial system of criminal justice, in France was laying the basis for the inquisitorial system. This goes back to the medieval church's efforts to investigate and eliminate heresies. In southern France of the 12th century for example, corruption and immoral behavior by clerics led to the establishment of various movements in response such as the Cathari, that the Church declared heretical, and authorized a Crusade against them at the Third Lateran Council. Despite this and much bloodshed, the movement grew. At the 1229 Council of Toulouse, Dominicans organized investigations into the heresy, attempting either to change their beliefs or stopping their proliferation; these were called inquisitions, and secular criminal procedure began to adapt the church methods into their own systems, and became the basis for the French inquisitorial system.

=== Maréchaussée ===
French criminal justice goes back to the Maréchaussée in the Middle Ages. From that time, and to a lesser extent until the end of the Ancien Régime, the functions of the police and the justice system were closely intertwined. (Note: The notions of "police" and "justice" did not have the same meaning at that time as they do today. The police were part of the justice system and were its executive body. See Brouillet (2013).) Kings, lords and high dignitaries rendered justice. In that sense, justice in the armies was part of the remit of the Grand Constable of France, who succeeded the Seneschal in 1191 as head of the armies, and of the Marshals of France, who were his lieutenants. The Grand Constable and the marshals delegated their powers to their provosts.

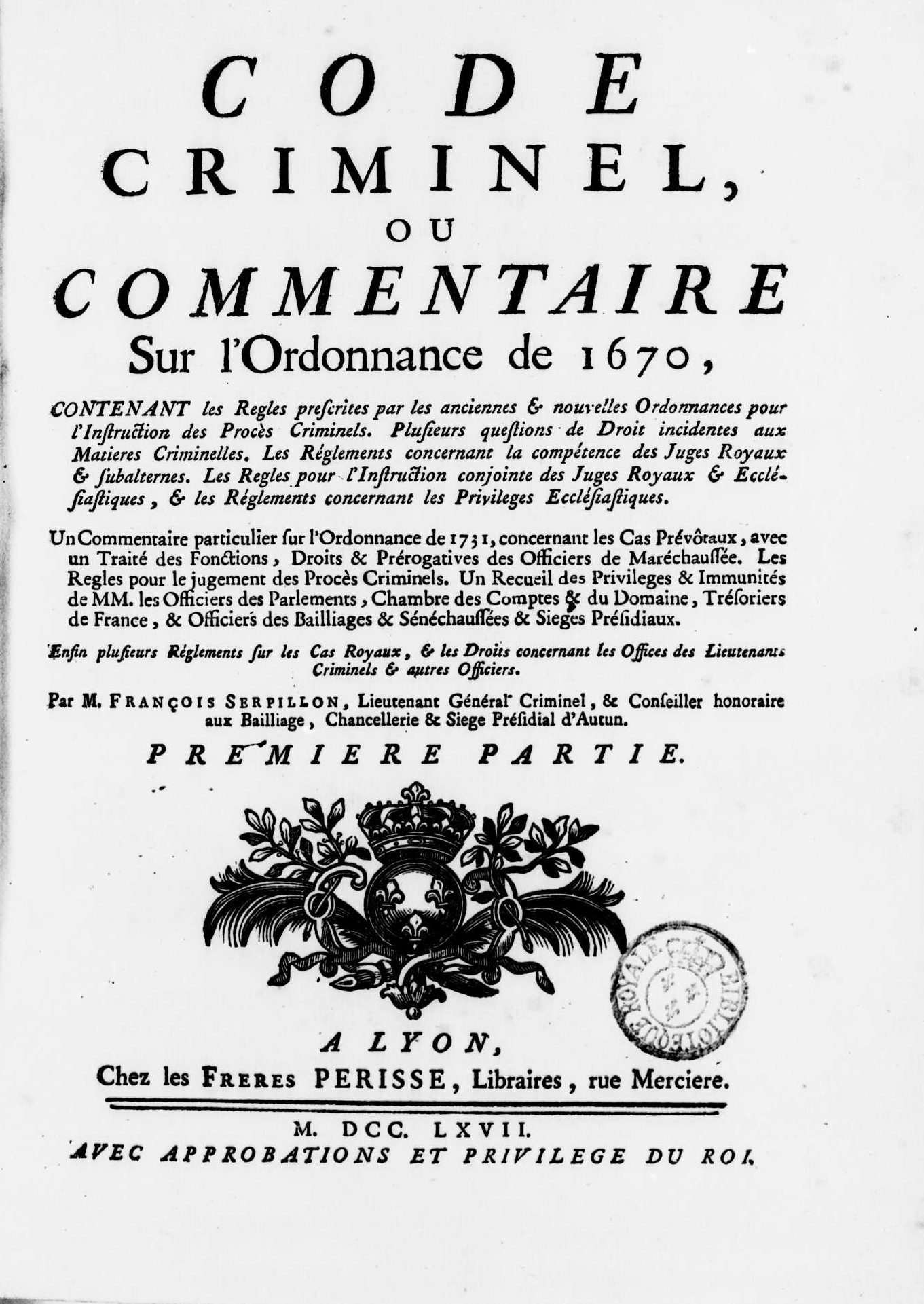
A 1767 commentary on the criminal code of 1670

These jurisdictions merged under Francis I under the name of the Constabulary and Marshalcy Tribunal, with its seat in Paris. The provosts also rendered justice to the armies in provostal courts. The enforcement bodies were the company of the Constabulary and the companies of the Maréchaussée. The Maréchaussée originally roamed the countryside catching and sentencing evildoers from among the military, and after 1536, among the civilian population as well. They also had the power to sentence perpetrators they had caught. There was no central organization, but they adopted the collective name maréchaussée ("marshalcy") because the detachments were assigned to army marshals.

The Constabulary was eliminated in 1626 by Louis XIII and the Constabulary and Marshalcy Tribunal was placed under the command of the Marshal of France. According to the Criminal Ordinance of 1670, certain crimes identified as "royal cases" were investigated by the Maréchaussée but judged by a chamber of the Parliament dealing with criminal matters, while the others, identified as "provost cases" (cas prévôtaux), were judged by the provost courts.

A series of reforms in the 18th century were instituted to make the Maréchaussée more effective, reinforce its military character, and improve coverage in the countryside. The edict of 1720 accentuated its territorial nature and created a hierarchy under a provost court and a Maréchaussée detachment in each of the thirty-six governments or provinces, with a provost at the head of each one in the provincial capital. The provostships (prévôtés) were divided into lieutenancies with a lieutenant in each city heading up a presidial court. By 1778, on the eve of the Revolution, there was a corps of 4,000 men in the Maréchaussée, which developed into the first national police force in France.

=== Late ancien régime ===
Criminal law in the 16th to 18th centuries was fairly static, and had a basis in the growing awareness of Roman law during the Renaissance. Rulings generally followed the Roman Digest, except when local customs or written tracts clearly dealt with a specific situation. Although French criminal lawyers were inspired by the Romans to write treatises on the law, the content was based more on local or feudal custom.

Criminal law was also influenced by Christianity, and by canon law. Ecclesiastical courts played an important role in the Middle Ages, and trials were held on any subject which the Church felt touched their domain (heresy, witchcraft, adultery, etc.), and cooperated with non-Church authorities in handing over the most serious offenders. The most original aspect of Church law was in the influence of sin and penitence; punishment was based in retribution. Where revenge was more about hurting individuals or groups based on a grievance, retribution was a sanction based on the moral responsibility of the offender, intended to expiate the wrong, and in proportion to the seriousness of the offense.

The age of the offender was taken into consideration in dispensing punishment, retaining the Roman distinction between infants, pre-pubescent, pubescent, and so on. If they were Latin: doli capax, lit. 'capable of deceit', they could be legally punished, including capital punishment for children of 11.

The guiding principle was retribution, not rehabilitation; the focus was on preserving the public order and the general population, while separating out and penalizing the bad portion. There was much regional variation in interpretation of criminal law, and also implementation of penalties, which tended to be harsh. Little was written, and the types of offenses and attendant penalties derived from custom; Roman texts were examined to determine what they were and how to proceed. The Criminal Ordinance of 1670 attempted to codify the customary practices, but it did not list specific offenses or their penalties, so it was unclear what activities were permitted, or the penalties if they were prosecuted. Judges retained arbitrary discretion to rule as they saw fit, including whether a defendant was guilty or not. Since all power derived from the King, they had ultimate power to order an existing prosecution under the King's Seal to be quashed, or to circumvent the procedures and orders of judges and courts to convict and imprison an individual, even in the absence of guilt, or even commission of a crime; these orders were known as lettres de cachet.

=== French Revolution ===
One of the signal events of the French Revolution was the declaration by the National Constituent Assembly on 4 August 1789 abolishing the feudal system in France. In November, this included suspension of the judicial system of the Ancien regime and its 13 regional parlements, followed by abolition in 1790. This led directly to the first formal codification of French law, including civil law, and criminal law.

=== Codification ===
==== Criminal Ordinance of 1670 ====
See § Late ancien régime.

==== Code of 1791 ====
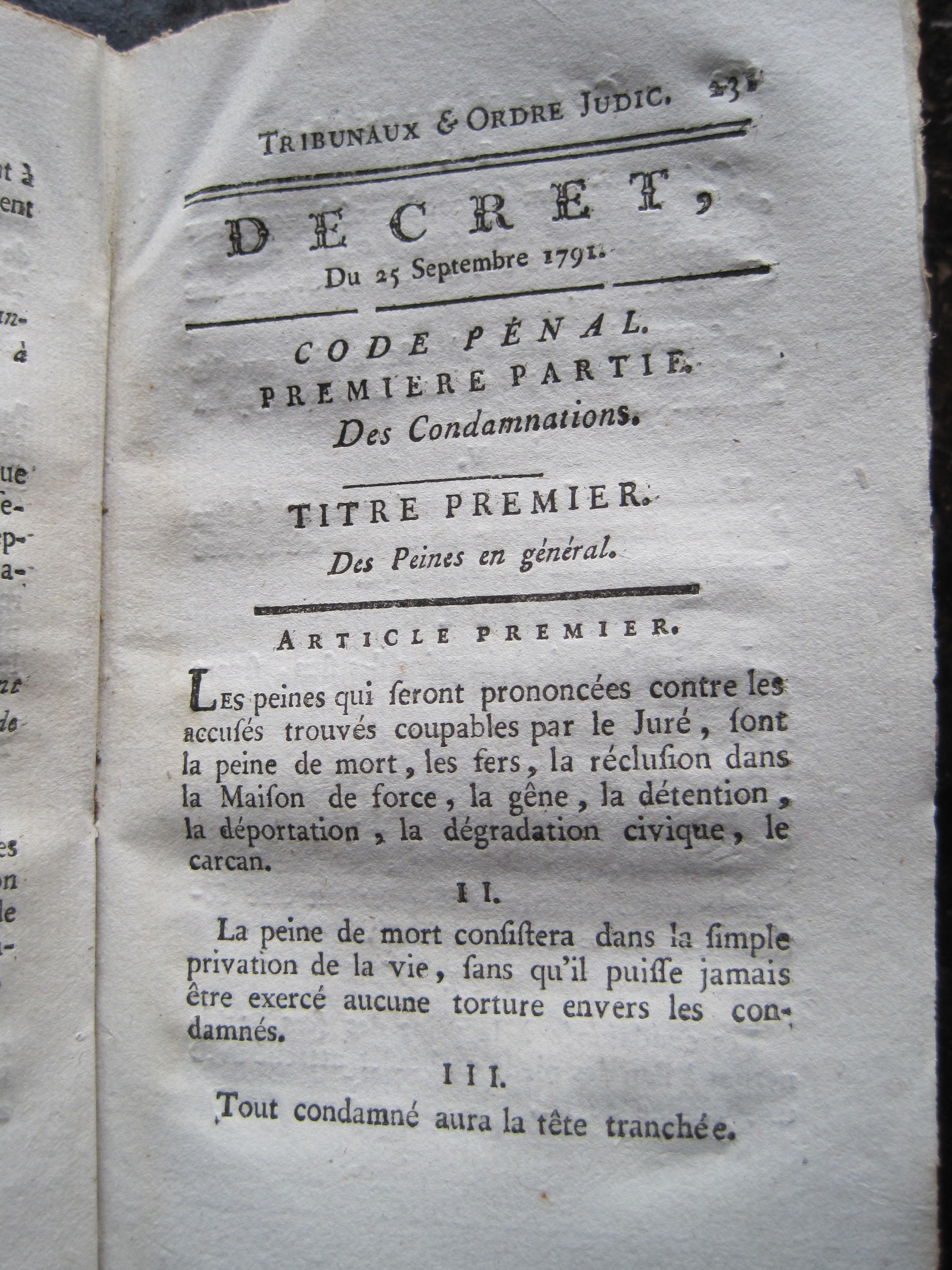

Articles 1-3 of the code of 1791

The Penal Code of 1791 was adopted during the Revolution by the Constituent Assembly, between 25 September and 6 October 1791. It was France's first penal code, and was influenced by the Enlightenment thinking of Cesare Beccaria and Montesquieu.

Penal law in particular had been a source of great controversy during the French Revolution, during which the first Penal Code and numerous constitutions were produced. An important feature of the 1791 code, as well as the 1795 Code of Offences and Penalties, was fixed penalties to keep the role of judge strictly distributive, thereby eliminating the previous tradition of arbitrary sentencing.

==== Code of 1795 ====
The Code of Offences and Penalties (Code des délits et des peines) was a criminal code adopted in revolutionary France by the National Convention on 25 October 1795.

The code deals with judicial organization, criminal procedure, and criminal sanctions. It distinguishes between the functions of administrative police, which is concerned with the prevention of crimes and offenses, and judicial police, which is concerned with the investigation of crimes and identification of suspects. This distinction is still in force in the Fifth Republic.

==== Code of 1808 ====
Due to severe deficiencies noted in the 1785 code, the Consulate named a five-man commission in 1801 to come up with a replacement for the criminal code as well as the procedural code. The criminal investigation code (procedural code) was published in 1808, and the criminal code in 1810. The procedural code of 1808 was a combination of the accusatory and the inquisitorial systems and remained in effect until 1958, when it was replaced by the Code of criminal procedure of 1958 in the advent of the Fifth Republic.

==== Code of 1810 ====
The Penal code of 1810 was a code of criminal laws created under Napoleon, replacing the French Penal Code of 1791. It replaced various laws adopted during the first ten years of the Revolution, including the 1791 code and the 1795 code of Offenses. With the 1810 penal code, sentences were given a set range, allowing judges more latitude to decide on the severity of the punishment. The 1810 code was revised twice: a major change in 1832, the second, much more limited, in 1863.

==== Code of 1994 ====
The current criminal code (code pénal) is the codification of French criminal law. It took effect 1 March 1994 and replaced the French Penal Code of 1810, which had been in effect until then. This in turn became known as the "old penal code" for the rare decisions that still needed to refer to it.

The Penal Code project began with the work of the Commission for Revision created in 1974 by President Valéry Giscard d'Estaing. The 1978 draft of Book I (General Provisions) was heavily criticized by the criminal justice community and rejected by the government in 1980. After government changed hands in 1981, Robert Badinter, a former criminal lawyer who had become Minister of Justice, took over the commission. In 1989, François Mitterrand prioritized the project during his second term as president. The new penal code was passed by Parliament on 22 July 1992, followed by an amendment in December, and corrections in February 1994. It came into force on 1 March 1994.

Initially known as the new penal code (nouveau code pénal), it was not so much a reform of the French Penal Code of 1810, but an original work with a new outline, new principles, a new formulation of the law, and even a new numbering system that is hierarchical instead of sequential.

It introduced a number of new concepts, such as the criminal responsibility of legal persons (responsabilité pénale des personnes morales) (not including the State itself) in Article 121–2, and increased the sentencing for almost all délits and crimes.

=== Reforms ===
There have been numerous amendments and reforms since the 1994 code was promulgated.

In 2010, there was the law criminalizing psychological violence within intimate relationships, created by law 2010-769 of 9 July 2010.

A major reform of the criminal justice system was introduced in 2011, including reform of garde à vue, penal reform for minors, and more participation of citizens in the criminal justice process.

The criminalization of clients of prostitution was passed in Law 444 of 2016, with the aim of combating human trafficking and the exploitation of sex workers.

== Basic principles ==
French criminal law is governed by the principle of legality and its three corollaries, the principle of strict interpretation of the law, the application of criminal law in time, and the application of criminal law in space.

=== Principle of legality ===
The principle of legality (Note: The principle of legality (principe de légalité) states that no one may be convicted and sentenced without a clear and precise law; that is, "no crime, no punishment, without a law". Portions go back to ancient times, and it was eventually reconceptualized during the Enlightenment, first by Cesare Beccaria, and then by Montesquieu in 1748. As a legal precept in France, it is known as the principle of legality in French criminal law.) (French: principe de légalité) is one of the most fundamental principles of French law, and goes back to the Penal Code of 1791 adopted during the Revolution.

French legal publisher Dalloz describes it this way:

The principle of legality of offenses and penalties (or principle of criminal legality) is a fundamental principle of modern criminal law, as expressed by the phrase "Nullum crimen, nulla poena sine lege"; it means that there can be no crimes, offenses, or contraventions without a prior definition of said offenses, as contained in a text setting out their constituent elements and the penalty which applies to them. In other words, it implies that an individual can only be prosecuted and sentenced by the application of a law that exists prior to the act of which he is accused.

— Légalité des délits et des peines, Dalloz

This principle is enshrined in the first chapter of the penal code, General Principles, in article 111–3.

=== Division of authority ===
The legal framework established by the Revolution put Parliament in charge of all three severity levels of infractions, but this was changed later, and now there is a division of authority, with Parliament retaining control of the two most serious levels, crimes and délits, whereas contraventions are now considered a regulatory matter, and are handled by the government, not Parliament. This is covered in the first chapter of the code, in article 111–2.

=== Application in time and space ===
The principle of criminal liability is defined in the constitution, and a fundamental corollary of it is the application of the criminal law in time (application de la loi pénale dans le temps). This principle defines the non-retroactive nature of criminal sanctions, and is governed by article 112-1 of the penal code. The article defines the disposition in cases where acts were committed around the time a new law was taking effect.

== Sources ==
Sources of the penal code come from national (French) sources, and international sources, and come from written and unwritten (judicial, praetorian) sources. Written sources include the Constitution, the Preamble, and various penal codes, including some going back to the Revolution, or even for example the 1539 ordinance under Francois I mandating the use of the French language. The main source of criminal law is the penal code: it "expresses a value system allowing one to distinguish what is permitted from what is prohibited, and to measure the level of tolerance of a transgression of social norms".

Today, the sources of French criminal law tend more and more to be international, under the influence of jurisprudence in European courts such as the Court of Justice of the European Union (CJEU) and the European Court of Human Rights (CEDH).

== Infractions ==
=== Definitions ===
==== Infraction ====
An infraction (offense) is conduct prohibited by the criminal law and punishable by a penalty specified in the law. It can be defined as an action or omission that disrupts the peace and exposes its perpetrator to a security measure or a penal sanction. The purpose of the special criminal law is to codify offenses, classified according to their level of severity in a tripartite division in the penal code: crimes, délits and contraventions.

Each type of offense has a court with jurisdiction (compétence) over it, and each type has a different statute of limitations that applies to it; ten years for a § Crime, three years for a § Délit, and one year for a § Contravention. Limitation periods are longer for offenses against minors.

==== Crime ====
Crimes are the most serious offenses. Tried by the cours d'assises with a criminal jury, they carry a sentence of criminal detention for life.

Examples: rape; procuring; torture; inhumane working conditions; slavery; homicide; genocide; crimes against humanity; robbery with violence; receiving stolen goods; etc.

Before 1981, crimes were subject to the death penalty. The types of crimes most frequently tried in France are homicide, rape, and armed robbery.

==== Délit ====
Délits are an intermediate level which covers various categories of offenses. They fall under the jurisdiction of the Correctional court (Tribunal correctionnel) and may be tried by a panel of judges or by a single judge. The minimum penalty is a 3750 Euro fine, The maximum penalty is ten years' imprisonment, which can be increased to twenty years in the event of recidivism, particularly in cases of organized crime. The most frequently prosecuted offenses are theft and fraud, assault and battery, property damage, drug trafficking, and traffic offenses (lack of a driver's license, Driving under the influence of alcohol). Other correctional penalties include the day-fine; citizenship training; and community service.

Examples: theft; sexual assault; embezzlement; witness tampering; contempt of court; influence peddling.

There is no agreement in English sources about how to refer to délit in English. The tripartite division of infractions in French law does not line up well with concepts in common law, and translations of délit into English vary. Some terms seen include: felony, major offense, intermediate offense, minor offense, minor crime, and misdemeanor. Many English sources describe the term on first appearance, and then just refer to it using the French term after that.

==== Contravention ====
A contravention is a low-level offense (such as a parking ticket) and is handled by the tribunal de police. They are mainly related to violations of traffic law, and low-grade violence. Contraventions are divided into five classes according to their severity. The majority of traffic offenses are handled administratively and automatically (suspension of driving license or adjustment of "points", in particular), but judges are sometimes required to issue fines themselves. The fine incurred does not exceed €3,000.

=== Components ===
An offense in French criminal law (infraction) comprises three components:

- the legal basis (préalable légal) for pursuing a criminal case;
- the material element; and
- the moral element.

==== Legal basis ====
The first of the three components is the legal basis (préalable légal) for pursuing a criminal case. The public prosecutor or other investigating official must establish the legal basis for charging someone with an offense. This consists of describing the acts committed, and identifying the specific legal text purported to have been violated in the commission of these acts, as required by the principle of legality in French criminal law.

==== Material element ====
The second of three components required for a criminal case is the material element (élément matériel). This is the visible, external part of the offense, i.e., the actions involved in carrying out a criminal act. It can be an act, a gesture, something written, a spoken word, aiming to harm an interest protected by the law. It is known in some common law systems as the actus reus of an offense.

==== Moral element ====
The moral element (élément moral) is one of the three components of an offense, and refers to the psychological attitude of the perpetrator towards the commission of the acts deemed to be punishable by criminal law. The perpetrator may have acted with intent, or through recklessness or negligence. The fault is said to be intentional or unintentional, and applies to crimes and délits. Without the moral element, there is no offense. Contraventions only require evidence of voluntary action by the perpetrator. Known in some common law systems as the mens rea of an offense.

Article 121-3 of the Criminal Code says:

There is no serious crime or major crime in the absence of an intention to commit it. (Note: Moral element: Il n'y a point de crime ou de délit sans intention de le commettre.)

== Courts ==
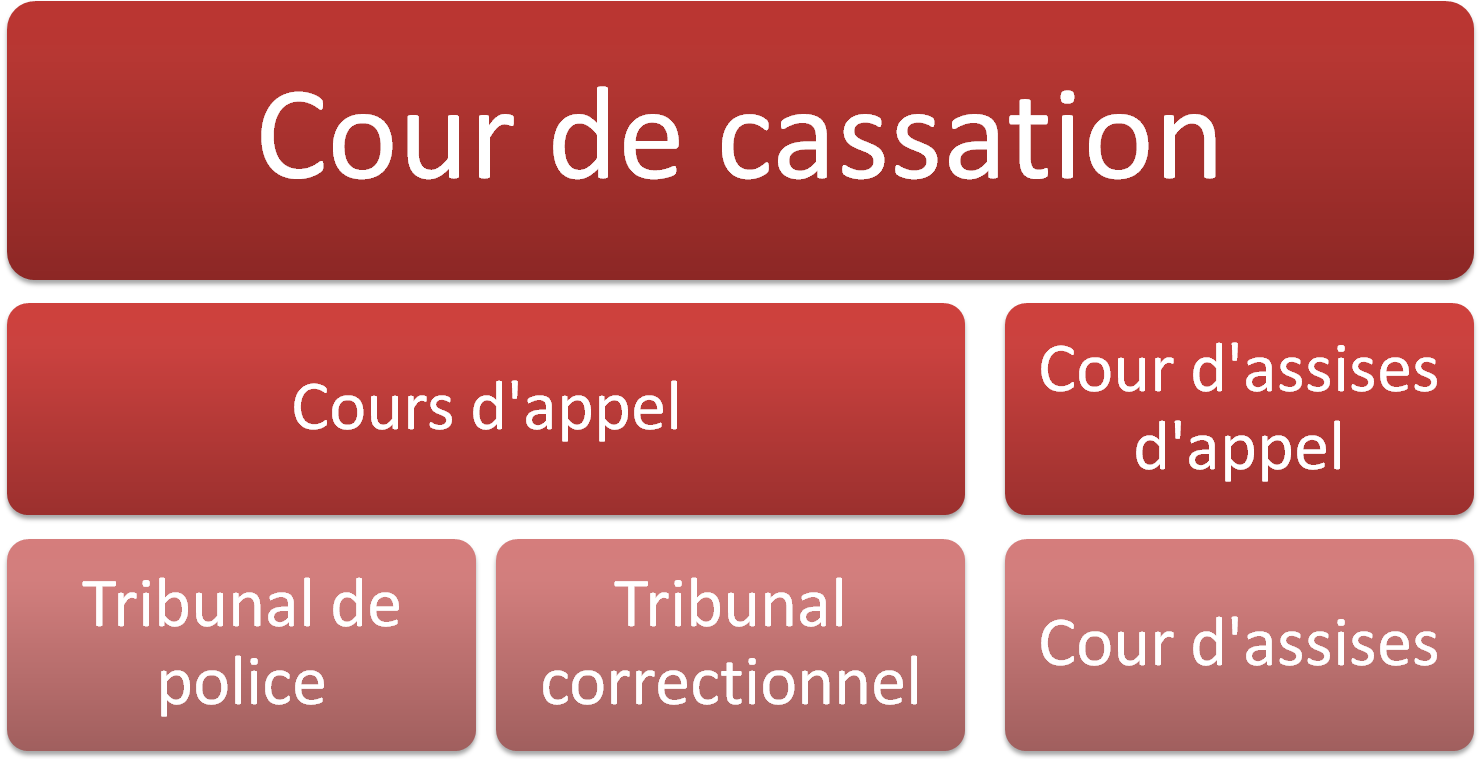
Courts involved in French criminal justice

Courts involved in adjudicating questions of French criminal law are organized in three tiers.

In the first instance, there are the police court, the correctional court, and the Cour d'assises. The Police court (tribunal de police) hears contraventions (minor infractions like parking tickets). The Criminal court (also known as Correctional court, tribunal correctionnel) hears délits, less serious felonies and misdemeanors. The Court of Assizes sits in each of the departments of France and is normally composed of three judges and six jurors, and has jurisdiction over more serious crimes.

In the second instance : the Court of appeal, and the Appeal court of assizes. When it sits as a court of appeal, the Court of Assizes is composed of three judges and nine jurors, or seven judges alone.

In the last resort: the criminal chamber of the Court of Cassation (cour de cassation), located in Paris, is the highest level of appeal in France for criminal cases and hears appeals from the assize courts and the courts of appeal.

== Procedure ==
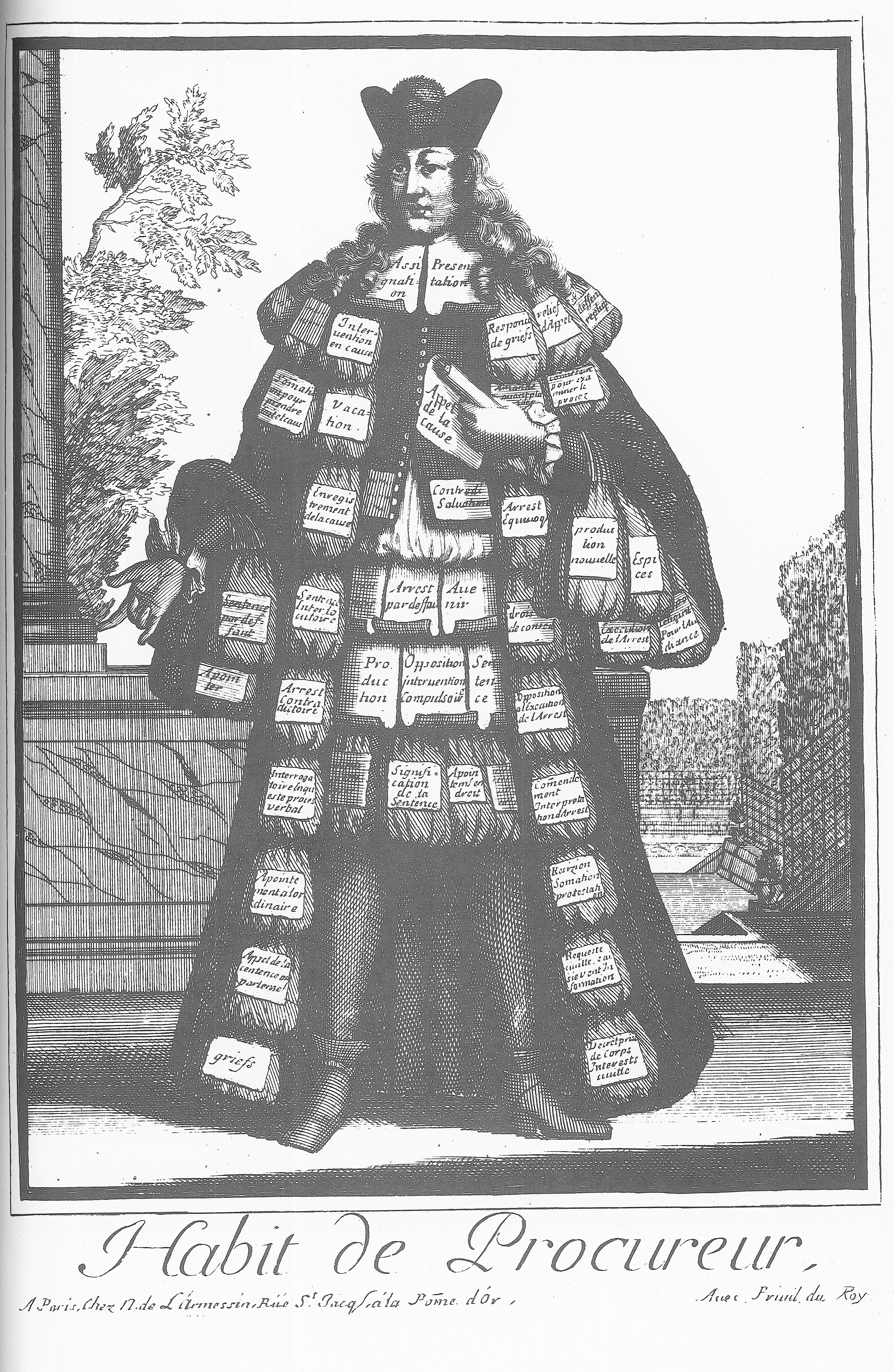
Habit de Procureur by Nicolas II de Larmessin c. 1700–1725

Criminal procedure includes everything involved in the suppression of offenses, from discovery of a possible offense, investigation by police or investigating judge, apprehension of suspects, the roles of police, prosecutors, and judges, rights of the accused, what happens inside a police station, what happens in court, how a prosecution is carried out, and what happens when someone is found guilty and imprisoned. These procedures are codified in French law by the code of French criminal procedure.

=== Complaint ===
A complaint by a victim or a law enforcement official, or denunciation by a third party is the initial step in launching a criminal investigation.

=== Investigation ===
Criminal procedure starts with the investigation phase. The investigation has two parts: the preliminary police investigation (enquête) and the in-depth investigation (instruction) under the supervision of the court.

The preliminary police investigation takes place under supervision of the public prosecutor's office (procureur). In this phase, the police make inquiries in order to determine if a crime has been committed, and attempt to find a suspect.

In the second phase, the in-depth investigation is carried out to see if there is enough evidence to warrant prosecution. The second part is normally carried out by the prosecutor (procureur), or in some serious cases, by the investigating judge (juge d'instruction).

Defendants in a criminal case cannot plead guilty. A defendant may confess to a crime, but this becomes one more piece of evidence that can be used against them. Plea bargaining does not exist.

== Sanctions ==
=== Background ===
The concept of punishment for offenses has its origins in the Declaration of the Rights of Man, article 8. The Declaration is recognized in the Preamble to the French Constitution, and is invested with constitutional power, due to the 1971 Liberty of Association decision of the Constitutional Council, which said:

No one may be punished except by virtue of a law established and promulgated prior to the offence and legally applied. (Note: Nul ne peut être puni qu'en vertu d'une loi établie et promulguée antérieurement au délit, et légalement appliquée.)

This principle, also known by its Latin name, Nulla poena sine lege, is common to democratic states and considered fundamental to the rule of law, and was elucidated by Italian jurist Cesare Beccaria in his 1764 On Crimes and Punishments.

=== Sentencing ===
Judges are given wide latitude to pronounce sentence on a defendant found guilty of a criminal offense, within the range provided by statutes covering each of the three categories of offense. Seriousness of the offense, quality of the evidence, attitude of the defendant, and other factors may be taken into account by the judge. The judge may assign probation, at their discretion, and a probationary judge (juge de l'application des peines) assigns someone to supervise the parolee. Probationary terms may be up to three years. All sentences may be appealed.

Alternative sentences may be imposed, such as performing community service (travail d'intérêt général). Other alternative sentences include a citizenship course (peine de stage), a fine, or others. If the perpetrator admits guilt, prosecutors have the option of imposing a composition pénale such as a fine or community service, which goes on their criminal record but is not considered a conviction. Alternatives to incarceration arose initially from local initiatives, and have become a more mainstream path to clearing the prosecutorial docket. In 1994, only 10% of prosecutorial decisions resulted in an alternative sentence, but in 2000 they were one third, and by 2012 almost one half.

=== Penalties ===
The penalty, or criminal sanction, is the corollary of the offense. Since October, 2014, Article 130-1 of the Penal Code has defined the two main functions of criminal sanctions as: "to punish the perpetrator, and to promote their reform, reintegration, or rehabilitation." (Note: to promote their reform, reintegration, or rehabilitation: favoriser son amendement, son insertion ou sa réinsertion.)

Penal sanctions are based on the three crime categories, contraventions, délits, and crimes, which are new categories created in the legal reform of 1994. There are also different courts of first instance to deal with each of them.

Contraventions, such as minor traffic offenses, minor assaults, noise problems, and other petty offenses are punished with fines.

Délits are more serious offenses, some of which carry a term of imprisonment, which may be from six months to ten years, and may be accompanied by fines. These include theft, manslaughter, assault, drug offenses, and serious traffic offenses such as driving while intoxicated.

The most serious are crimes, punishable by a sentence of ten years to life imprisonment, such as murder, rape, robbery, or kidnapping. Formerly, capital punishment was the most severe penalty, but it was abolished in 1981, and became unconstitutional in 2007.

=== Influence of politics ===
Attitudes toward criminal sanctions is a political issue in France, and laws and sentencing may be affected by the political winds, as laws established under one administration are later modified or undone by a later administration with different political objectives and other laws are established. Issues such as prison overcrowding, perspective of the victim, recidivism, non-custodial alternatives to incarceration, and being "tough on crime" are part of the public debate. These issues rose to the level of presidential politics in the election of 2012. Sentencing policies and related legislation ebb and flow with the party in power. For example, the 2014 law on the individualization of penalties (Note: Loi no. 2014-896 of 15 August 2014, Law relating to the individualization of sentences and reinforcing the effectiveness of criminal sanctions.) was introduced in 2012 by newly elected Socialist Party president François Hollande to reform mandatory minimum sentences introduced earlier under right-wing president Nicolas Sarkozy, under whose administration the prison population rose from 48,000 to 64,000. In response, a Consensus Commission (Conférence de consensus) was established under the PS in 2012 in order to reduce recidivism. The commission's report was opposed by interior minister Manuel Valls who favored building more prisons and increasing incarceration, while justice minister Christiane Taubira favored greater use of alternative sentencing and sending fewer people to prison.

== See also ==
- Classical school (criminology)
- Code of Offences and Penalties
- Codification (law)
- Cour d'appel (Appellate court), procedures in common law vs. French jurisdictions
- Court of Appeal (France) – differs considerably from common law appeal court procedures.
- Court of Cassation – general scope, does not discuss France specifically
- Declaration of the Rights of Man and of the Citizen
- French penal code
- Francis Le Gunehec, magistrate, co-author of the penal code project
- Glossary of French criminal law
- International criminal law
- Law of France
- Napoleonic Code – civil, not criminal
- Nulla poena sine lege
- Race (French Constitution)

== Works cited ==
- Anyangwe, Carlson (23 September 2015). Criminal Law: The General Part. African Books Collective. ISBN 9789956762675. OCLC 1053502597.
- John Bell; Sophie Boyron; Simon Whittaker (27 March 2008). Principles of French Law (2 ed.). OUP Oxford. ISBN 978-0-19-101889-3. OCLC 865331945.
- Bermann, George A.; Picard, Etienne, eds. (1 January 2008). Introduction to French Law. Kluwer Law. ISBN 978-90-411-2466-1. OCLC 219574344.
- "The decline of constabulary police". Encyclopedia Britannica. 2021. "The military police roamed the countryside—they were not allowed to stay in one place for more than two days in a row—to catch military and, eventually, civilian offenders and to use their sentencing power to inflict punishment, for which there was no appeal. These special forces were not at first united in a single organization, but they came to be known collectively as the maréchaussée, as they were assigned to the various army marshals."
- Brouillet, Pascal (2013). "Au commencement était la Maréchaussée". In Luc, Jean-Noël; Médard, Frédéric (eds.). Histoire et dictionnaire de la gendarmerie: de la Maréchaussée à nos jours. Paris: Éditions Jacob-Duvernet. ISBN 978-2-84724-496-0. OCLC 869914346.
- Cairns, Walter; McKeon, Robert C.; McKeon, Robert (1995). Introduction to French Law. Cavendish. ISBN 978-1-85941-112-4. OCLC 246842627.
- Champion, Dean J. (2008). Sentencing: A Reference Handbook. ABC-CLIO. ISBN 978-1-59884-087-2. OCLC 1151269945.
- "Code pénal - Art. 111-2" (in French). Paris: Editions Dalloz. Archived from the original on 22 November 2022. "Art. 111-2"
- "Code pénal – Art. 111-3" (in French). Paris: Editions Dalloz. Archived from the original on 22 November 2022. "Art. 111-3 Nul ne peut être puni pour un crime ou pour un délit dont les éléments ne sont pas définis par la loi, ou pour une contravention dont les éléments ne sont pas définis par le règlement. Nul ne peut être puni d'une peine qui n'est pas prévue par la loi, si l'infraction est un crime ou un délit, ou par le règlement, si l'infraction est une contravention." [Art. 111-3 No one may be punished for a serious crime or a major offense whose elements are not defined by law, or for a minor offense whose elements are not defined by a regulation. No one may be punished by a penalty that is not provided for by law, if the offense is a crime or a délit, or by the regulations, if the offense is a contravention.]
- "Code pénal - Art. 112-1". Dalloz (in French). Paris: Editions Dalloz. Archived from the original on 22 November 2022. "Art. 112-1 Sont seuls punissables les faits constitutifs d'une infraction à la date à laquelle ils ont été commis. Peuvent seules être prononcées les peines légalement applicables à la même date. Toutefois, les dispositions nouvelles s'appliquent aux infractions commises avant leur entrée en vigueur et n'ayant pas donné lieu à une condamnation passée en force de chose jugée lorsqu'elles sont moins sévères que les dispositions anciennes." [Art. 112-1 Only acts constituting an offense on the date they were committed are punishable. Only the penalties legally applicable on the same date may be imposed. However, the new provisions apply to offenses committed before their entry into force and which have not given rise to a conviction that has become res judicata when they are less severe than the old provisions.]
- "Code pénal - Art. 121-3". Dalloz (in French). Paris: Editions Dalloz. "Art. 121-3 Il n'y a point de crime ou de délit sans intention de le commettre." [There is no crime or offense without the intention to commit it.]
- "Code pénal - Art. 131-5" (in French). Paris: Editions Dalloz. "Art. 131-5 Lorsqu'un délit est puni d'une peine d'emprisonnement, la juridiction peut prononcer une peine de jours-amende consistant pour le condamné à verser au Trésor une somme dont le montant global résulte de la fixation par le juge d'une contribution quotidienne pendant un certain nombre de jours." [When an offense is punishable by imprisonment, the court may impose a day-fine penalty consisting of the convicted person paying to the Treasury a sum of money, the total amount of which is determined by the judge as a daily payment for a certain number of days.]
- "Légalité des délits et des peines" [Principle of criminal legality]. Dalloz (in French). Paris: Editions Dalloz. August 2021. "Principe fondamental du droit pénal moderne exprimé par la formule "Nullum crimen, nulla poena sine lege", le principe de légalité des délits et des peines (ou principe de légalité criminelle) signifie qu'il ne saurait y avoir de crimes, de délits et de contraventions sans une définition préalable de ces infractions, contenue dans un texte fixant leurs éléments constitutifs et la peine applicable. Autrement dit, il implique qu'un individu ne peut être poursuivi et condamné que par l'application d'une loi préexistant à l'acte qui lui est reproché." [The principle of legality of offenses and penalties (or principle of criminal legality) is a fundamental principle of modern criminal law, as expressed by the phrase "Nullum crimen, nulla poena sine lege"; it means that there can be no crimes, offenses, or contraventions without a prior definition of said offenses, as contained in a text setting out their constituent elements and the penalty which applies to them. In other words, it implies that an individual can only be prosecuted and sentenced by the application of a law that exists prior to the act of which he is accused.]
- "Élément matériel de l'infraction - Fiches d'orientation" [Material element of the infraction - Fact sheets]. Dalloz (in French). Paris: Editions Dalloz.
- "Élément moral de l'infraction - Fiches d'orientation" [Moral element of the infraction - Fact sheets]. Dalloz (in French). Paris: Editions Dalloz. July 2021.
- "Application de la loi pénale dans le temps | Fiches d'orientation" [Application of the law in time | Fact sheet]. Dalloz (in French). Paris: Editions Dalloz. 2 September 2021. "La question de l'application de la loi pénale dans le temps se pose dès lors que des faits ont été commis et n'ont pas encore été définitivement jugés lors de l'entrée en vigueur d'une loi nouvelle." [The question of the application of criminal law with respect to time arises when acts have been committed and have not yet been finally judged when a new law comes into force.]
- Delmas-Marty, Mireille; Spencer, J. R., eds. (17 October 2002). European Criminal Procedures. Cambridge University Press. ISBN 978-0-521-59110-2. OCLC 1025272735.
- Dongois, Nathalie (15 January 2010) [2008:Temple]. "Wrongful Convictions in France: The Limits of "Pourvoi en Revision"". In C. Ronald Huff; Martin Killias (eds.). Wrongful Conviction: International Perspectives on Miscarriages of Justice. Temple University Press. p. 251. ISBN 978-1-59213-646-9. OCLC 502419498.
- Doucet, Jean-Paul (11 April 2019). "Dictionnaire de droit criminel" [Dictionary of Criminal Law] (in French). Archived from the original on 7 January 2023.
- Elliott, Catherine (2001). French Criminal Law. Portland OR: Willan. ISBN 978-1-135-99307-8. OCLC 49494876.
- Hall, Jerome (2010). General Principles of Criminal Law. The Lawbook Exchange, Ltd. ISBN 978-1-58477-498-3. OCLC 1131553404.
- Hanson, Paul R. (23 February 2007). The A to Z of the French Revolution. Lanham, Maryland: Scarecrow Press. ISBN 978-1-4617-1606-8. OCLC 1011012469.
- Hodgson, Jacqueline (8 November 2005). French Criminal Justice: A Comparative Account of the Investigation and Prosecution of Crime in France. Bloomsbury Publishing. ISBN 978-1-84731-069-9. OCLC 1048749661.
- Hodgson, Jacqueline; Soubise, Laurène (21 June 2016). "Understanding the sentencing process in France". Crime and Justice. 45 (1). Univ. of Chicago: 221–265. doi:10.1086/685538. ISSN 0192-3234. OCLC 6914375713.
- Jean, Jean-Paul (2010). Le système pénal [The penal system]. Repères (in French). La Decouverte. ISBN 978-2-7071-5414-9. OCLC 758870056.
- Jones, Mark; Johnstone, Peter (22 July 2011). "4 From the Lateran Coucils to the Renaissance (c. 1150–1550)". History of Criminal Justice (5 ed.). Abingdon, Oxon.: Routledge. ISBN 978-1-317-52245-4. OCLC 897455626.
- French Ministry of Justice (2023). "Lexique | Justice.fr" [Glossary | Justice.fr]. Ministère de la Justice (in French).
- Larrieu, Louis; Service historique de la gendarmerie nationale (2002). Histoire de la maréchaussée et de la gendarmerie: des origines à la quatrième république [History of the Marshalsea and the Gendarmerie: from the origins to the fourth republic]. Ivry-sur-Seine: Phénix éd. ISBN 978-2-7458-0796-0. OCLC 469644979.
- Le Gendre, Bertrand (27 February 1980). "La réforme du code pénal remise en cause La logique de la répression" [The reform of the penal code questioned. The logic of the rejection.]. Le Monde (in French). Paris.
- Mathias, Éric (2007). Procédure pénale [Criminal procedure]. Lexifac. Droit. Rosny sous Bois: Editions Bréal. ISBN 978-2-7495-0786-6. OCLC 239664322.
- French Ministry of Justice (4 December 2008). "L'infraction". Ministère de la Justice (in French). Archived from the original on 31 May 2023.
- French Ministry of Justice (6 August 2008). "Les mots-clés de la Justice - Lexique" [Key words of Justice - Lexicon]. Ministère de la Justice (in French). Archived from the original on 31 March 2023.
- French Ministry of Justice (15 September 2021). "L'organisation de la justice en France" [Organization of justice in France]. Ministère de la Justice (in French). "Les juridictions françaises se répartissent en deux ordres : un ordre judiciaire et un ordre administratif. Les juridictions de l'ordre judiciaire sont compétentes pour régler les litiges opposant les personnes privées et pour sanctionner les auteurs d'infractions aux lois pénales. ... Les juridictions de l'ordre administratif sont compétentes dès qu'une personne publique est en cause (une municipalité ou un service de l'État par exemple)." [The French courts are divided into two orders: a judicial order and an administrative order. The courts of the judicial order are responsible for settling disputes between private individuals and for punishing the perpetrators of criminal offenses. ... The administrative courts have jurisdiction as soon as a public entity is involved (a municipality or a government department for example).]
- French Ministry of Justice (15 November 2021). "Présentation de l'ordre judiciaire" [Presentation of the judicial order]. Ministère de la Justice (in French). "L'ordre judiciaire se divise en deux catégories de juridictions : les juridictions civiles et les juridictions pénales. Les juridictions civiles tranchent les litiges." [The judiciary order is divided into two categories of courts: the civil courts and the criminal courts. The civil courts decide disputes.]
- French Ministry of Justice (16 December 2016). "La justice pénale en France" [Criminal justice in France]. Ministère de la Justice (in French).
- Merle, Roger; Vitu, André (1984). Traité de droit criminel. Vol. 1 (5 ed.). Paris: Cujas. no. 146. ISBN 9788792002754. OCLC 263103447. "l'ensemble des régles juridiques qui organisent la réaction de l'État vis-a-vis des infractions et des délinquants" [the set of legal rules that govern the State's response to offenses and offenders]
- Newman, Graeme R., ed. (19 October 2010). Crime and Punishment around the World [4 volumes]: [Four Volumes]. ABC-CLIO. pp. 147–. ISBN 978-0-313-35134-1. OCLC 1010964660.
- Pin, Xavier (2020). Droit pénal général 2021 [General criminal law 2021]. Cours (in French) (12 ed.). Paris: Dalloz. ISBN 978-2-247-20307-9. OCLC 1201687783.
- Ministère de l'Intérieur (10 October 2011). "Histoire de la police judiciaire | Direction Centrale de la Police Judiciaire | Organisation - Police nationale" [History of the judicial police | Central Directorate of the Judicial Police | Organization - National Police] (in French).
- Pradel, Jean (1 January 2008). "Criminal Law". In Bermann, George A.; Picard, Etienne (eds.). Introduction to French Law. Frederick: Kluwer Law International B.V. ISBN 978-90-411-2466-1.
- Rassat, Michèle-Laure (27 June 2017). Procédure pénale - 3e édition. Editions Ellipses. pp. 246–247. ISBN 978-2-340-05096-9. OCLC 1250439989.
- Stewart, John Hall (1951). A Documentary Survey of the French Revolution. New York: Macmillan. pp. 106–112. OCLC 401456.
- Terrill, Richard J. (2009). World Criminal Justice Systems: A Survey (7 ed.). New Providence, NJ: Lexis Nexis. ISBN 978-1-59345-612-2. OCLC 430736627.
- Ancel, Marc (January 1958). "The Collection of European Penal Codes and the Study of Comparative Law". University of Pennsylvania Law Review. 106 (3): 329–384. doi:10.2307/3310471. JSTOR 3310471. S2CID 67824864. Archived from the original on 16 July 2014.
- Ancel, Marc; Verin, Jacques (1973). "France". The American Journal of Comparative Law. 21 (2): 263. doi:10.2307/839123. ISSN 0002-919X. JSTOR 839123.
- Crépin, Marie-Yvonne (6 February 2018) [2017]. "Le Code d'instruction criminelle" [Code of criminal investigation] (in French).
- Elliott, Catherine (1 December 2010). Heller, Kevin Jon; Dubber, Markus (eds.). The Handbook of Comparative Criminal Law. Stanford University Press. ISBN 978-0-8047-7729-2. OCLC 1162537706.
- Guerinot, Romain (18 July 2018). "Le Droit Pénal et le Droit Civil" [Criminal Law and Civil Law]. LegaVox.fr (in French). Nice. "Le Droit Pénal a pour fonction de pénaliser... Si le Droit pénal met en place une répression qualifiée de verticale, la Société imposant le respect de la norme et sanctionnant son non-respect, le Droit Civil organise quant à lui une relation horizontale, elle répare le préjudice causé par une personne envers une autre." [The function of Criminal Law is to penalize... If on the one hand Criminal Law sets up a repressive relationship one could describe as vertical, with society imposing respect for norms and sanctioning non-compliance, Civil Law on the other hand establishes a horizontal relationship, repairing the damage caused by one person towards another.]
- Guerinot, Romain. "Action civile" [Civil action]. LegaVox.fr (in French). Nice. "[P]ar l'action civile, la partie civile va demander la réparation de son préjudice." [By the civil action, the plaintiff demands reparation for damages.]
- Guerinot, Romain. "Action publique" [Public action]. LegaVox.fr (in French). Nice.
- Hall, Jerome (2010). General Principles of Criminal Law. The Lawbook Exchange, Ltd. ISBN 978-1-58477-498-3. OCLC 1131553404.
- Ministry for Europe and Foreign Affairs (2 October 2018). Anne-Claire Legendre (ed.). "France and the Death Penalty". Paris.
- République française; Secrétariat général du gouvernement (19 October 2022). "Légifrance Le service public de la diffusion du droit" [The public service for dissemination of the law]. Légifrance. Direction de l'information légale et administrative. ISSN 2270-8987. OCLC 867599055.
- Le Monde (22 October 1981). "M. Badinter préside la commission de révision du code pénal" [Mr. Badinter presides over the commission for revision of the penal code]. Le Monde (in French). Paris.
- Leruth, Michael F. (18 October 2022). Modern France. ABC-CLIO. pp. 100–. ISBN 978-1-4408-5549-8.
