= Principle of legality in criminal law =

The principle of legality in criminal law was developed in the eighteenth century by the Italian criminal lawyer Cesare Beccaria and holds that no one can be convicted of a crime without a previously published legal text which clearly describes the crime (Latin: nulla poena sine lege, lit. 'no punishment without law'). This principle is accepted and codified in modern democratic states as a basic requirement of the rule of law. It has been described as "one of the most 'widely held value-judgement[s] in the entire history of human thought ' ".

== By country ==
=== Brazil ===
In Brazil, the Principle of legality (Brazilian Portuguese: Princípio da legalidade) is enshrined in the Constitution in Article 5, paragraph 2, which states that "No one shall be compelled to do or refrain from doing anything except by law". (Note: In the Brazilian Constitution: "Ninguém será obrigado a fazer ou deixar de fazer alguma coisa senão em virtude de lei." Constitution, Article 5.)

=== Canada ===
In Canada, the principle of legality in penal law is found in Article 9 of the Canadian Criminal Code which declares that criminal infractions must fall under Canadian law, and that no one may be found guilty of a criminal infraction under common law. The principle of legality is also mentioned in Article 11g: "Every defendant has a right to not be found guilty of an action or omission which, at the moment it took place, did not constitute an infraction under the internal law of Canada..." Article 11g does however make an exception for crimes unanimously considered in international law to be genocide or crimes against humanity.

=== Council of Europe ===
Member states of the Council of Europe (all internationally recognized countries in Europe except Belarus, Russia, and Vatican City, plus Armenia, Azerbaijan, Cyprus, and Georgia) are parties to Article 7 of the European Convention on Human Rights (ECHR), which prohibits punishment for acts or omissions which were not crimes at the time of their commission, as well as punishment in excess of the penalty available at the time.

=== France ===
The principle of legality in France (French: principe de légalité) goes back to the Penal Code of 1791 adopted during the French Revolution. The principle has its origins in the 1789 Declaration of the Rights of Man and of the Citizen, which endows it with constitutional force and limits the conditions in which citizens may be punished for infractions.,

France is also a member of the Council of Europe, and thus subject to Article 7 of the ECHR.

=== Germany ===
In Germany, Article 103, paragraph 2 of the Basic Law for the Federal Republic of Germany (German Constitution) bans retroactive criminality:

An action is only subject to a penalty if it was punishable under the law that was in effect before the action was taken.

Enacted after the fall of the Nazi régime, it was reaffirmed in a court decision concerning the actions of East German officials.

Germany is also a member of the Council of Europe, and thus subject to Article 7 of the ECHR.

=== Switzerland ===
Article 1 of the Swiss Criminal Code provides that a penalty may only be pronounced for an action expressly forbidden by law.

An "illegal" action may be "licit" in Switzerland if there is a justifying circumstance, such as legitimate defense or necessity.

Switzerland is also a member of the Council of Europe, and thus subject to Article 7 of the ECHR.

=== United States ===
In the United States, the Fifth Amendment of the Constitution of the United States contains the concept of due process. Retroactive criminal laws are forbidden in Article I of the Constitution, section 10, paragraph 1.

== See also ==
- Nulla poena sine lege
- Principle of legality in French criminal law

== Works cited ==
- "Brazil 1988 (rev. 2017) Constitution". Constitute. Translated by Rosenn, Keith S.
- "The Constitution Act, 1982, Schedule B to the Canada Act 1982 (UK), 1982, c 11". CanLII. Ottawa: Canadian Legal Information Institute. 30 November 2022.
- Parliament of Canada (1985), "Criminal Code RSC 1985, c C-46", CanLII, Ottawa: Canadian Legal Information Institute
- "Code pénal – Art. 111-3" (in French). Paris: Editions Dalloz. Archived from the original on 2022-11-22. "Art. 111-3 Nul ne peut être puni pour un crime ou pour un délit dont les éléments ne sont pas définis par la loi, ou pour une contravention dont les éléments ne sont pas définis par le règlement. Nul ne peut être puni d'une peine qui n'est pas prévue par la loi, si l'infraction est un crime ou un délit, ou par le règlement, si l'infraction est une contravention." [Art. 111-3 No one may be punished for a crime or a délit whose elements are not defined by law, or for a contravention whose elements are not defined by regulation. No one may be punished by a penalty that is not provided for by law, if the offense is a crime or a délit, or by the regulations, if the offense is a contravention.]
- Hall, Jerome (1960). General Principles of Criminal Law. The Lawbook Exchange, Ltd. ISBN 978-1-58477-498-3. OCLC 1081150629.
- Hobe, Stephan; Tietje, Christian (8 March 2021). "Government Criminality: The Judgment of the German Federal Constitutional Court of 24 October 1996 German Law Developments 39 German Yearbook of International Law 1996". German Yearbook of International Law. 39: 523.
- Shahram, Dana (20 February 2009). "Beyond Retroactivity to Realizing Justice: A Theory on the Principle of Legality in International Criminal Law Sentencing". Journal of Criminal Law and Criminology. 99 (4): 857–928. ISSN 0091-4169. JSTOR 20685063. OCLC 5544569306.
- United States. Supreme Court (2001). Official Reports of the Supreme Court. Supreme Court. pp. 468–. OCLC 2532452.
- United States (1789). "Constitution, Amendment V". Legal Information Institute. Cornell University.
