= French code of criminal procedure =

Laws governing police and courts in French criminal cases

The French code of criminal procedure (French: Code de procédure pénale) is the codification of French criminal procedure, "the set of legal rules in France that govern the State's response to offenses and offenders". It guides the behavior of police, prosecutors, and judges in dealing with a possible crime. The current code was established in 1958 and replaced the code of 1808 created under Napoleon.

== Terminology ==
According to a widely quoted definition by Roger Merle and André Vitu, the code de procédure pénale, or code of criminal procedure, is "the set of legal rules that govern the State's response to offenses and offenders". (Note: Merle & Vitu: l'ensemble des régles juridiques qui organisent la réaction de l'État vis-a-vis des infractions et des délinquants.)

=== Criminal law and criminal procedure ===
Criminal law (droit pénal) deals with an individual's rights and obligations under the law, as codified in a penal code. Under French criminal law, the penal code (CP) defines what acts (or omissions) are punishable. Criminal procedure (procédure pénale) focuses on how individuals accused of crimes are dealt with in the criminal justice system: how people are investigated, prosecuted, tried, and punished. In France, these procedural issues are codified in the French code of criminal procedure (Code de procédure pénale).

== Role ==
Unlike civil law, which is applied without applying to the courts for the most part, criminal law is carried out through observance of the rules established by a written code, which connects the infraction committed, through a series of procedures leading ultimately to a sentence for an offender found guilty. Whereas civil law and civil procedure are separate areas of law, criminal law and criminal procedure are closely intertwined, and the glue is the code of criminal procedure.

== Precursors ==
=== Roman law ===
Roman law was codified, and in the south of France the Jus gentium continued to be used, although mostly only in the case of public and administrative law, and private law was left to the localities to determine. The distinction between private law and public law goes back to Ulpian, a Roman jurist of the third century, who wrote: "Public law is what regards the welfare of the Roman state, private law what regards the interests of individual persons; because some things are of public, others of private utility." (Note: Ulpian wrote: "huius studii duae sunt positiones: publicum et privatum. Publicum ius est, quod ad statum rei Romanae spectat; privatum, quod ad singulorum utilitatem." in Digest, § 1.2.1.1.)

=== Old French law ===
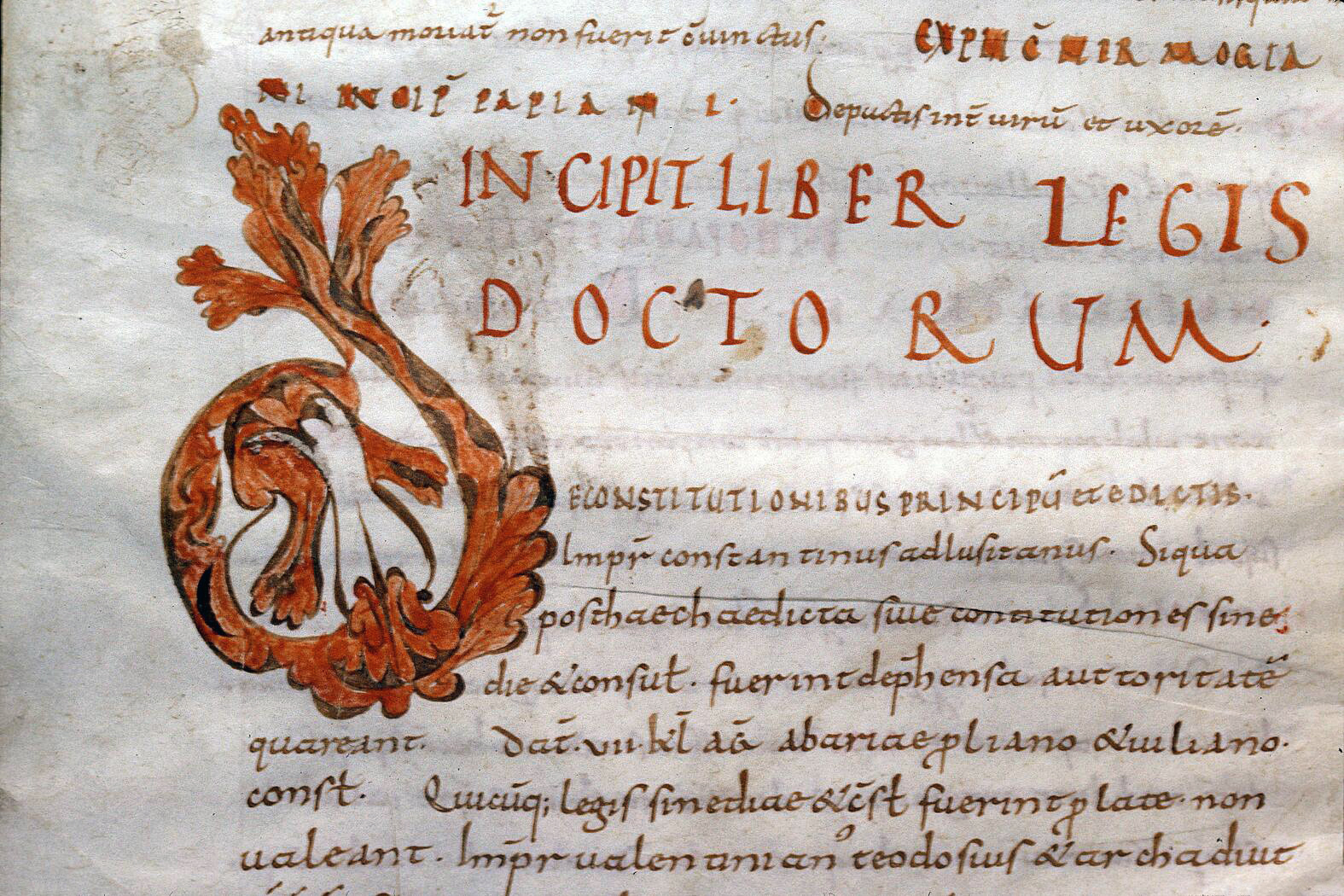
Incipit from a 10th-century manuscript of the Breviarium Alaricianum

The sixth century Lex Romana Visigothorum was the most important document reflecting this usage. But classic Roman law became vulgarized through mixture with local laws, and under the influence of victorious Germanic Frankish tribes, who had their own, customary law, which became written around the sixth century, such as the Lex Salica and the Lex Ripuaria. With a multiplicity of laws, which one was applied became aligned with the dominant race in an area. A demarcation line roughly along the Loire River evolved, where south of the Loire the law depended on a version of customary Roman law and was known as the "land of written law" (le pays de droit écrit), whereas north of the Loire, it depended more on laws of Germanic origin and was known as the "land of customary law" (le pays de droit coutumier), which was still influenced by Roman law to fill in missing portions.

In the 12th century and after, there was renewed interest in Roman law throughout France. In the north, local customary laws began to be consolidated and written, under a decree by Charles VII in 1454 (Ordinance of Montils-les-Tours), and became an important source of written law which influenced the Napoleonic Code. Beyond just forming the base of written customary law, it also gained enough authority to inspire written commentary on it, which in the aggregate came to be recognized as a body of general principles of French customary law, despite some regional differences. (Note: Written commentary about the Ordinance of Montils-les-Tours: notably by Charles Dumoulin, Jean Domat, Antoine Loysel, Guy Coquille, and Robert Joseph Pothier.) But it wasn't until the 17th century that many of them were written, such as Customary law in Burgundy, in Paris, Brittany, and other French customary laws. The difference between (droit écrit and droit coutumier) lasted until 1789.

=== 1670 code ===
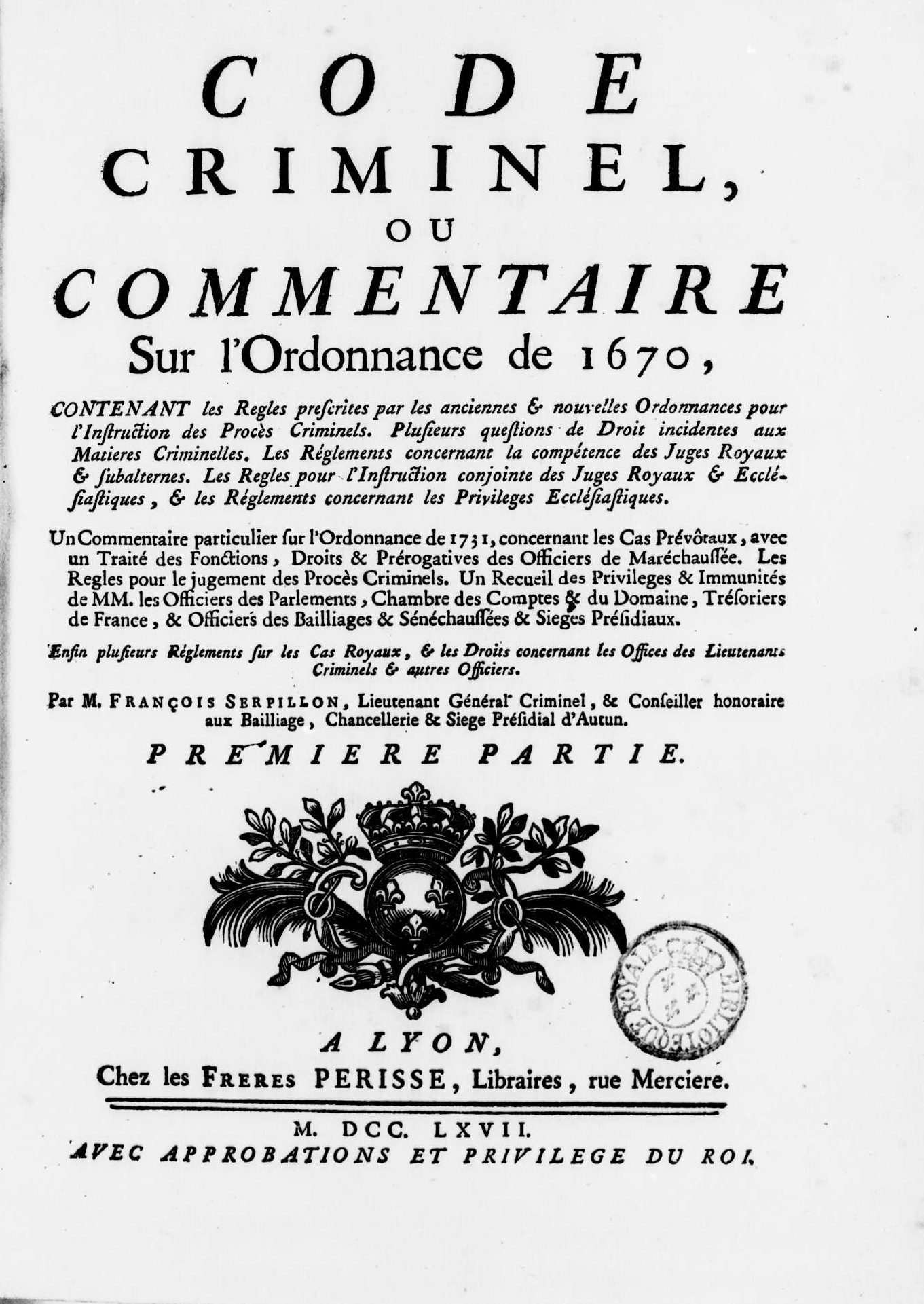
François Serpillon (1767) Code criminel, ou commentaire sur l'ordonnance de 1670

The idea of codification of law goes back to antiquity. (Note: One of the earliest was the Code of Hammurabi from 1750 BCE.) The Ancien regime had no penal code; however, it had a code of criminal procedure in the form of the Criminal Ordinance of 1670 (ordonnance criminelle de 1670). It remained in force until the French Revolution, when it was repealed by a decree adopted by the National Constituent Assembly on 9 October 1789.

=== 1808 code ===
The Code of Criminal Procedure (Code d'instruction criminelle) is a collection of legal texts which organized criminal procedure in the revolutionary era in France. Envisaged as early as 1801, it was promulgated on 16 November 1808.

The code established the Cour d'assises to try crimes (major felonies). There was one court in each department, and were the only courts in France to use juries, which were composed of twelve jurors. The court initially had a chief justice (président) and four other justices (two others after 1831) who voted with the président to determine the sentence. Trial proceedings in the cour d'assises were theatrical in nature, with the président, the jurors, the court clerk, the public prosecutor, witnesses, and the defendant all taking part in more or less formalized declarations at different points of the trial, which could go on for several days. It concluded with the prosecution offering its closing argument, followed by the defense. Flashes of oratorical style might be used to influence impressionable jurors. Before 1881, the chief justice might present a summation, which could neutralize somewhat the dramatic final arguments. Jurors rendered their verdict based on impressions, and a majority (seven of twelve) was sufficient to convict.

The 1808 code made legal assistance obligatory for a criminal defendant, and if he could not choose one, the judge assigned him one on the spot, under penalty of nullifying the entire procedure that follows. (Note: The accused will be asked to declare his choice of counsel to assist him in his defense; otherwise, the judge will appoint one immediately, on pain of nullity of all subsequent proceedings.)

The 1808 code was repealed with the advent of the Fifth Republic, and replaced by the Code of criminal procedure of 1958.

== 1958 code ==
The Code of criminal procedure established in 1958 is the modern criminal procedure code in force in France as of September 2023.

=== Adoption ===
The Code of Criminal Procedure of 1958 is a direct successor to the Code d'Instruction Criminelle of 1808.

The new code was adopted by law 57-1426 of 31 December 1957, and has undergone many amendments since.

=== Summary ===
Book One (articles 11 to 230-53): Criminal policy, prosecution and investigation (conduite de la politique pénale, de l'exercice de l'action publique et de l'instruction) covers the conduct of the prosecution and investigation, the authorities responsible for them, identity checks by police (contrôle d'identité) [e.g., in [book one, title II: Titre II : Des enquêtes et des contrôles d'identité (Articles 53 à 78-7)], and the jurisdictions involved.

Book Two (articles 231 to 566): Trial courts (juridictions de jugement) is about trial jurisdictions, and covers: proceedings in the assize court, trial of middling-level crimes (délits), trial of petty infractions (contraventions), and citations and service (mandats?).

Book Three (articles 567 to 626-1): Extraordinary remedies (voies de recours extraordinaires). Concerns channels for extraordinary recourse, and mandates procedures for petition for review and revision.(demandes en révision et en réexamen)

Book Four (articles 627 to 706-182): Special procedures (procédures particulières). Describes procedures for some particular proceedings. These include trial in absentia; forgery; a case involving the disappearance of procedural papers;(is this one specific case)? the regulation of judges; transfer of venue and extradition; recusals; offenses committed abroad; and the prosecution, investigation of health and environmental matters.

Book Five (articles 707 to 803-8), sentence enforcement (exécution des sentences pénales). Covers the execution of penal sentences, detention, parole, sentence suspension, recognition of the identify (identity?) of convicted persons, imprisonment for payment, statute of limitation for punishments, the record of convictions, the rehabilitation of convicts, and the costs of justice.

Book Five B (articles A53-2 to A53-10) digital procedures. Covers use of the storage, use, and transmission of digital data, including such topics as electronic signature, electronic document storage, scanning and digitization of procedural documents, and digital transmission of documents.

It also includes Regulations of the Conseil d'Etat (Articles R1 to R430), Décrets simples (Articles D1 to D605), and Arrêtés (Articles A1 to A53-10).

== Accessibility ==
The code of criminal procedure is available online under a decree by the French government which established it. The Légifrance website was set up under this law, and access is freely available to all.

== See also ==
- Code of Offences and Penalties
- Cour d'appel (Appellate court)
- Court of Appeal (France)
- Court of Cassation
- Criminal justice system of France
- Declaration of the Rights of Man and of the Citizen
- French penal code
- Glossary of French criminal law
- Law of France
- Napoleonic Code – civil, not criminal

== Works cited ==
- Doucet, Jean-Paul, ed. (2016) [1st pub. Le Moniteur Universel:1808]. "Code d'instruction criminelle de 1808, Deuxième partie, Livre II - de la justice" [1808 Code of Criminal Procedure, Part II, Book II - Justice]. Le droit criminel (in French).
- Dadomo, Christian; Farran, Susan (1996) [1st pub. 1993]. The French legal system (2nd ed.). London: Sweet & Maxwell. ISBN 0-421-53970-4.
- Dickson, Brice; Hübner, Ulrich (1994). Introduction to French law. London: Pitman. ISBN 9780273601401. OCLC 3479836.
- Donovan, James M. (2010). Juries and the Transformation of Criminal Justice in France in the Nineteenth and Twentieth Centuries. Studies in Legal History (illustrated ed.). Chapel Hill: Univ of North Carolina Press. ISBN 9780807895771. OCLC 593295717.
- Garé, Thierry; Ginestet, Catherine (September 2022). Droit pénal. Procédure pénale 2023 [Criminal law. criminal procedure 2023]. HyperCours (in French) (14 ed.). Paris: Editions Dalloz. ISBN 978-2-247-22075-5. OCLC 1346591522. p. pub. blurb: "Le droit pénal général étudie les principes généraux de la répression des infractions, la responsabilité et la peine. La procédure pénale régit le déroulement du procès pénal. Ces droits doivent assurer à la société une protection suffisante, sans sacrifier les libertés individuelles." [General criminal law deals with the general principles of punishment, liability and sentencing. Criminal procedure governs the conduct of criminal trials.]
- Kock, Gerald L.; Frase, Richard S. (1988). The French code of criminal procedure. American series of foreign penal codes, 29 (revised ed.). Littleton, Colo: F.B. Rothman. ISBN 9780837700496. OCLC 1080434512.
- République française; Secrétariat général du gouvernement (19 October 2022). "Légifrance Le service public de la diffusion du droit" [The public service for dissemination of the law]. Légifrance. Direction de l'information légale et administrative. ISSN 2270-8987. OCLC 867599055.
- Merle, Roger; Vitu, André (1984). Traité de droit criminel. Vol. 1 (5 ed.). Paris: Cujas. no. 146. ISBN 9788792002754. OCLC 263103447. "l'ensemble des régles juridiques qui organisent la réaction de l'État vis-a-vis des infractions et des délinquants" [the set of legal rules that govern the State's response to offenses and offenders]
- Roux, Jean-André (1925). "Procédure pénale". Précis élémentaire de droit pénal et de procédure pénale [A primer on criminal law and procedure] (in French). Paris: Recueil Sirey. p. 177. OCLC 18140063.
