= French criminal code =

Criminal law code of France

The French criminal code (French: Code pénal français) is the codification of French criminal law (droit pénal). It took effect on 1 March 1994 and replaced the French Penal Code of 1810, which had until then been in effect. This in turn has become known as the "old penal code" in the rare decisions that still need to apply it.

The new code was created by several laws promulgated on 22 July 1992. It introduced the judicial notion of fundamental national interests (intérêts fondamentaux de la nation) (Book IV, Title I).

== History ==
The Penal Code project began with the work of a commission created by President Valéry Giscard d'Estaing in a decree issued on 8 November 1974. The membership of the commission was set by a 25 February 1975 decree. The president of the commission was Maurice Aydalot, later replaced by Guy Chavanon, the procureur général of the Court of Cassation. The definitive draft of Book I (General Provisions), heavily criticised by the criminal justice community, was rejected by the Élysée Palace on 22 February 1980.

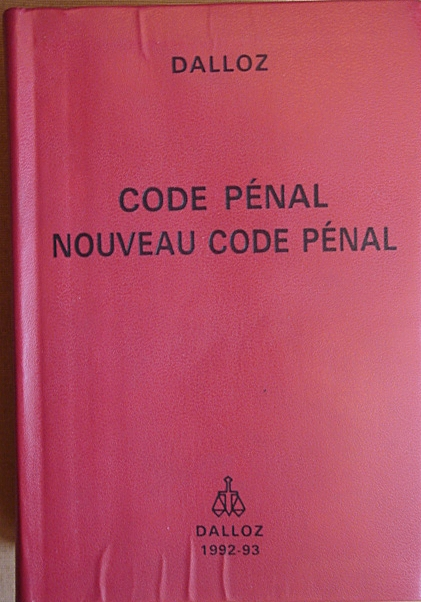
New penal code of 1993

After government changed hands in the 1981 presidential election, Robert Badinter, a former criminal lawyer who had become Minister of Justice, returned to the idea of penal code reform. Badinter took over the chairmanship of the commission created in 1975, whose membership had been greatly modified. The penal code project was discussed in the Parliament between 1989 and 1991.

Book I was approved in 1991 and was rapidly followed by Books II, III and IV.

The nouveau code pénal (new penal code, as it was initially known) was the result of several laws promulgated on 22 July 1992, which took effect on 1 March 1994. While the code theoretically remained the same, and kept the same title, Code pénal, the new code was not so much a modified or even a recast Code pénal de 1810, but rather an original work of composition and of writing, with a new outline, new principles and a new formulation of the law.

It introduced a number of new concepts, such as the criminal responsibility of moral persons (responsabilité pénale des personnes morales) apart from that of the State, (Article 121-2), and increased the sentencing for almost all délits and crimes.

=== Organizational structure ===
The penal code is composed of two parts:

- The Legislation part is composed of:
  - Four original books:
    - Book I: General provisions
    - Book II: Felonies and Misdemeanors Against the Person
    - Book III: Felonies and Misdemeanors Against Property
    - Book IV: Felonies and Misdemeanors Against the Nation, the State, and the Public Peace
    - Book IV b: Crimes and offenses of war
  - Three books added on 16 December 1992:
    - Book V: Other Felonies and Misdemeanors
    - Book VI: Of contraventions
    - Book VII: Provisions relatives to overseas
- The Regulation portion — (Decrees of the Conseil d'État) is composed of:
  - Four original books:
    - Book I: General dispositions
    - Book II: Crimes and offenses against persons
    - Book III: Crimes and offenses against goods
    - Book IV: Crimes and offenses against the nation, the State and the public peace (political offenses)
  - Three books were added on 16 December 1992:
    - Book V: Other crimes and offenses
    - Book VI: Contraventions
    - Book VII: Provisions relative to overseas

== Numbering scheme ==
Breaking with prior usage in other legislative codes such as the Code civil, the Code de procédure civile or the Code de procédure pénale where the articles are numbered in an ascending order, valid only for a given period, the numbering of the Code pénal is more structured.

Its first article is not number 1, but 111-1, the first article of the first chapter of the first title of the first book, from right to left (big-endian). Thus the numbering of Article 432-1 in the legislative section allows the hierarchy to be retraced, as follows:

- Article 432-1 of the penal code says "[l]e fait, par une personne dépositaire de l'autorité publique, agissant dans l'exercice de ses fonctions, de prendre des mesures destinées à faire échec à l'exécution de la loi est puni de cinq ans d'emprisonnement et de 75 000 euros d'amende".
- This is the first article (432–1) of Chapter 2 (432–1) titled "[d]es atteintes à l'administration publique commises par des personnes exerçant une fonction publique".
- Chapter 2 (432–1) is part of Title 3: (432–1) titled "[d]es atteintes à l'autorité de l'État".
- Title 3 (432-1) is part of Book 4 (432-1) entitled "[d]es crimes et délits contre la nation, l'État et la paix publique".

This numbering of the articles, called décimale in 1.4.2. of the Légifrance légistique guide, does not have delimiters such as the periods in the default numbering of scientific documents composed in LaTeX, which is more compact but caps at nine the maximum value of the first three levels, i.e. book, title and chapter.

The section, sub-section and paragraph hierarchical levels are not taken into account in the numbering, for example:

- According to Article 132-16 "theft, extortion, blackmail and abuse of trust are all considered. for purposes of recidivism, the same offense."
- It is the first article of Paragraph 3 titled "[d]ispositions générales".
- Paragraph 3 is part of Sub-section 2, titled "[d]es peines applicables en cas de récidive". (Of penalties for repeat offenders)
- Sub-section 2 is part of section 1, titled "[d]ispositions générales".
- Section 1 is part of chapter 2 (132–16) titled "[d]u régime des peines".
- Chapter 2 (132–16) is part of title 3 (132–16) titled "[d]es peines".
- Title 3 (132–16) is part of book 1 (132-16) titled "[d]ispositions générales".

The article is not number 132123-1 but number 16 of its chapter (132–16). However, a hierarchical structure can be discerned from the number of the article, for example :

- Article 131-36-12-1 of the penal code starts saying that "[p]ar dérogation [...] de la victime."
- It is the first article (131-36-12–1) of Article 12 (131-36–12–1) providing that "[l]e placement sous surveillance [...] mis à exécution."
- Article 12 (131-36–12–1) is part of Article 36 (131–36–12-1), which says "[qu'u]n décret [...] à l'article 131-35-1."
- Article 36 (131–36–12-1) is part of Sub-section 5 titled "[d]u contenu et des modalités d'application de certaines peines".
- Sub-section 5 is part of Section 1 titled "[d]es peines applicables aux personnes physiques".
- Section 1 is part of Chapter 1 (131–36-12-1) titled "[d]e la nature des peines".
- Chapter 1 (131–36-12-1) is part of Title 3 (131-36-12-1) titled "[d]es peines".
- Title 3 (131-36-12-1) is part of Book 1 (131-36-12-1) titled "[d]ispositions générales".

This numbering style, which originated in administrative regulations such as the Code général des collectivités territoriales, the Code de l'urbanisme, and the Code des impôts, allows new texts to be indefinitely added and interwoven without effect on the numbering. It is thus well-adapted to legislation that foresees indefinite future evolution.

== Fundamental interests of the nation ==
In 1992, law 92-686 was passed defining "crimes against the nation", adding Book IV to the criminal code. (Note: Book IV consists of aticles 410-1 through 450-5 of the criminal code.)

There are subdivided into vital, strategic, and force or power interests. (Note: The three types of interests: vital (Intérêts vitaux), strategic (stratégiques), and force or power interests (de puissance).) Vital interests include territorial integrity, unfettered exercise of French sovereignty, and protection of its citizens. Stragetgic interests include maintaining a peaceful Europe and surrounding area, including the Mediterranean, as well as regions affecting the French economy. France's power interests come from its role as a permanent member of the UN Security Council and its nuclear arsenal.

In response to the Paris attacks of January 2015, the French legislature passed a law on 24 July 2015 improving the capabilities of the government to gather and act on intelligence in certain areas, and created a new agency, the Committee for Oversight of Intelligence Gathering Techniques (Commission nationale de contrôle des techniques de renseignement, CNCTR) to oversee it. Under the law, requests for data gathering for intelligence purposes must be approved by the Prime Minister.

The 2015 law added to the concept of the Fundamental Interests of the Nation, measures which allow intelligence agencies to gather data for areas within the scope defined. Areas considered as belonging to the fundamental interests include: national defense, major foreign policy initiatives, major economic, social, and industrial interests, anti-terrorism programs, immediate threats to public order, organized crime, and proliferation of weapons of mass destruction. There has been pushback from civil liberties groups that the powers are ill-defined, and too broad to fit within European guidelines and too vague to be able to determine what is covered by the law.

== See also ==
- Codification (law)
- French code of criminal procedure
- Francis Le Gunehec, magistrate, co-author of the penal code project, head of the office of general criminal legislation, author of various works on criminal law
- Police Tribunal (France)
- Cour d'appel or Appellate court, describe procedures in common law jurisdictions, which differ from French appeals court procedure
- Court of Appeal (France) – differs considerably from common law appeal court procedures.
- Court of Cassation – general scope, does not discuss France specifically
- Court of Cassation (France) – highest judicial court of appeal in French law; differs considerably from procedures in common law jurisdiction
- Délit – in French criminal law, an offense of intermediate gravity, between contravention and crime

== Works cited ==
- Cate, Fred H.; Dempsey, James X., eds. (2017). "Systematic Government Access to Private-Sector Data in France". Bulk Collection: Systematic Government Access to Private-sector Data. OAPEN Library (illustrated ed.). Oxford: Oxford University Press. p. 54. doi:10.1093/oso/9780190685515.001.000 (inactive August 10, 2025). ISBN 9780190685515.
- Grégoire, Joseph Philippe (September 2002). The Bases of French Peace Operations Doctrine: Problematical Scope of France's Military Engagements Within the UN Or NATO Framework. Carlisle papers in security strategy (Report). Carlisle, Pennsylvania: Strategic Studies Institute, U.S. Army War College. ISBN 1-58487-101-6. OCLC 51183539. AD-a401 893.
- République française; Secrétariat général du gouvernement (19 October 2022). "Légifrance Le service public de la diffusion du droit" [The public service for dissemination of the law]. Légifrance. Direction de l'information légale et administrative. ISSN 2270-8987. OCLC 867599055.
- "France, French Penal Code of 1994 as Amended as of January 1, 1999". American Series of Foreign Penal Codes. 31. Translated by Tomlinson, Edward A. Littleton, Colorado: F. B. Rothman. 1999. ISSN 0066-0051. OCLC 1480723 – via HeinOnline.
- Tomlinson. "Translator's Preface". In Tomlinson (1999), p. xxi–xxii.
- Tomlinson. Introduction. In Tomlinson (1999), p. 1–28.
- Tomlinson. "Book I General Provisions". In Tomlinson (1999), p. 29–88.
- Tomlinson. "Book II Felonies and Misdemeanors against the Person". In Tomlinson (1999), p. 89–160.
- Tomlinson. "Book III Felonies and Misdemeanors against Property". In Tomlinson (1999), p. 161–196.
- Tomlinson. "Book IV Felonies and Misdemeanors against the Nation, the State, and the Public Peace". In Tomlinson (1999), p. 197–268.
- Tomlinson. "Book V Other Felonies and Misdemeanors". In Tomlinson (1999), p. 269–.
