= French judiciary courts =

One of two divisions of the French judiciary

The French judiciary courts (French: ordre judiciaire), also known as "ordinary courts", are one of two main divisions of the dual jurisdictional system in France, the other division being the administrative courts (French: ordre administratif).

Ordinary courts have jurisdiction over two branches of law:

- French civil law (French: droit civil), which involves settling civil cases between private individuals (also known as private law; droit privé)), and
- French criminal law (droit pénal).

Use of the term civil law in France means private law, and should not be confused with the group of legal systems descended from Roman Law known as the civil law legal system, in contrast to the common law legal system.

On an exceptional basis the judiciary may also become involved in certain litigation between an individual and the State or some other public person. Such litigation would include matters of expropriation, for example, where the expropriated party does not agree with the indemnification amount. Traffic accidents in which one of the vehicles belongs to the government would also fall under the jurisdiction of this court, as well, in this instance, as that of the juge civil, who also has the power to act; another example would be a case when the propriety of a contrôle d'identité is contested and needs to be determined.

== Legal context ==
Two degrés de juridiction, (degrees of jurisdiction), often exist in French law:

- One jurisdiction where the facts of the matter are judged For example, in criminal law: did the defendant in fact do what he is accused of?
- The other jurisdiction is law. For example, also in criminal law: if the defendant did do that, what legal rules apply?

The Court of Cassation hears appeals of the verdicts rendered by the courts of the above two jurisdictions. The Court of Cassaction itself only judges matters of law; it does not re-try the facts a third time.

The French legal system distinguishes between

- civil jurisdictions charged with litigation between persons, and
- criminal jurisdictions, which judge accusations of criminality and may apply sanctions pénales, criminal penalties.

== History ==
The organization of the French judiciary was first addressed by the judicial organization law of 1790 which established the justices of the peace, as well as district courts. The justices and the district courts served in turn as courts of first instance and appeals courts, in rotation. The same law also provided for commercial courts (tribunaux de commerce).

For criminal matters, criminal courts with a jury were created.

The Constitution of the Year VIII reorganized the court system. It retained the justices of the peace but separated the courts of first instance from the appeal courts.

The first juridictions de prud'hommes were created in 1806. In criminal matters, judgment by a jury is reserved for crimes, the most serious type of criminal doffense punishable by ten years or more in prison.

In 1958, justices of the peace were eliminated and replaced by the tribunal d'instance, the police court, and the Tribunal de grande instance (also the correctional court—tribunal correctionnel). The juridiction de proximité was introduced in 2002, but was scheduled to be eliminated starting January 1, 2013.

== First degree jurisdictions ==
=== Civil ===
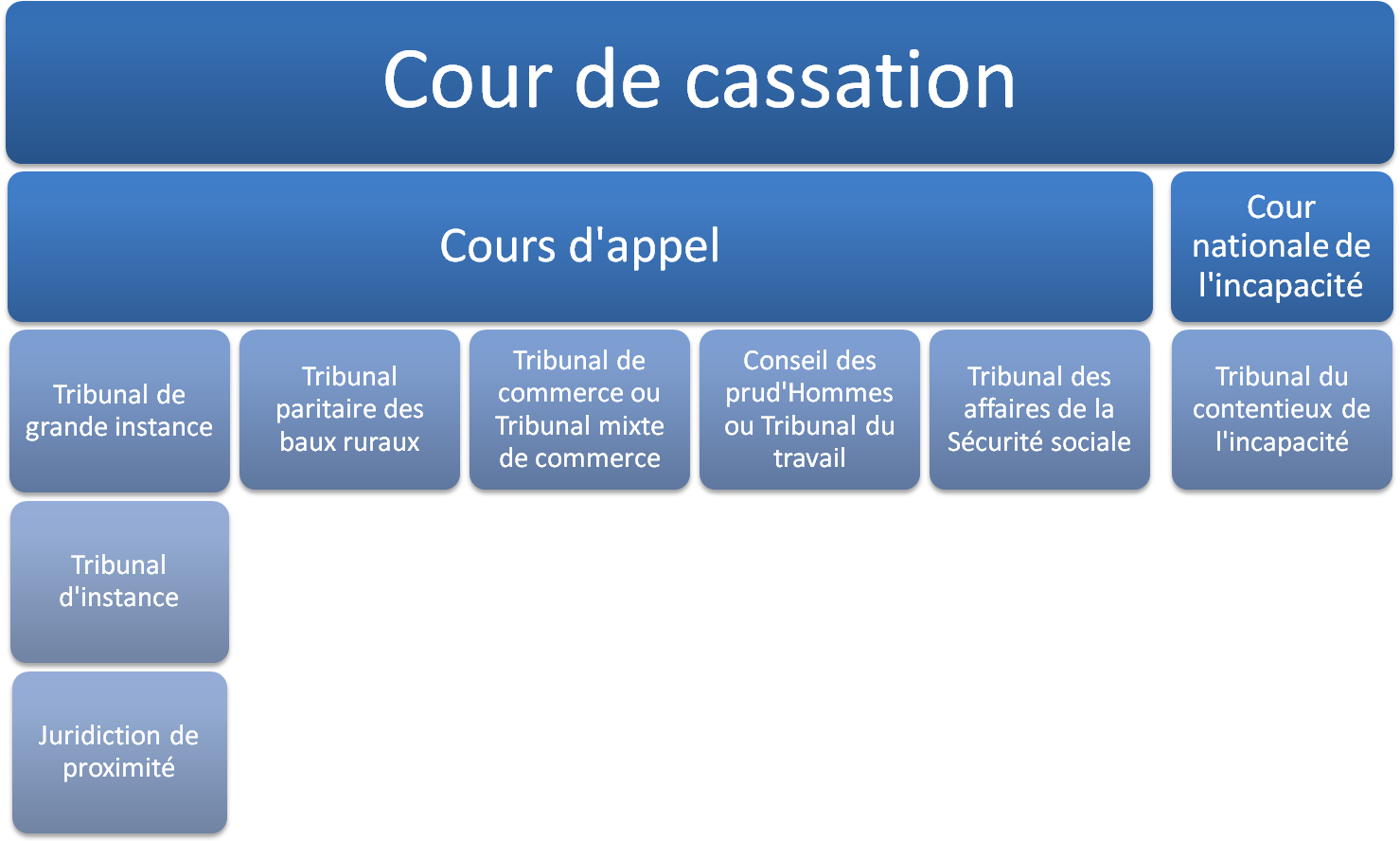
Organization of the French judiciary for civil matters.

The first-degree civil jurisdiction is so specific that it may be divided into several subjects areas (commercial, social, rural, etc.). These courts then have the deciding word in those subjects.

Other first-degree civil jurisdictions have a more general purview, but are divided by the taux de ressort, most often as the applicant requests.

This is the case in the following jurisdictions:

- Tribunal de grande instance
- Tribunal d'instance
- Juridiction de proximité

Where litigation is not specifically assigned by legislation to another jurisdiction, the tribunal de grande instance is responsible for litigation on matters involving more than 10 €000. But for litigation arising from real estate, the tribunal d'instance has authority over litigation evaluated where potential damages range between 4 €000 and €10,000, and the juridiction de proximité for litigation evaluated at 4 000 € or less.

In the overseas French possessions (collectivités d'outre-mer), naming sometimes differs from this pattern and a court of first instance (tribunal de première instance) exercises a general review power over first-degree civil jurisdiction.

The Agricultural land tribunals are responsible for some types of rural litigation.

==== Civil juvenile ====
The juge des enfants (juvenile judge), according to Article 151-3 of the Code de l'organisation judiciaire, may rule in any matter that concerns educational assistance measures under the conditions specified at Article 375. (Note: for all educational assistance measures under the conditions set out in articles 375 et seq. of the French Civil Code. (pour tout ce qui concerne les mesures d'assistance éducative dans les conditions prévues aux articles 375 et suivants du code civil.))

=== Criminal ===
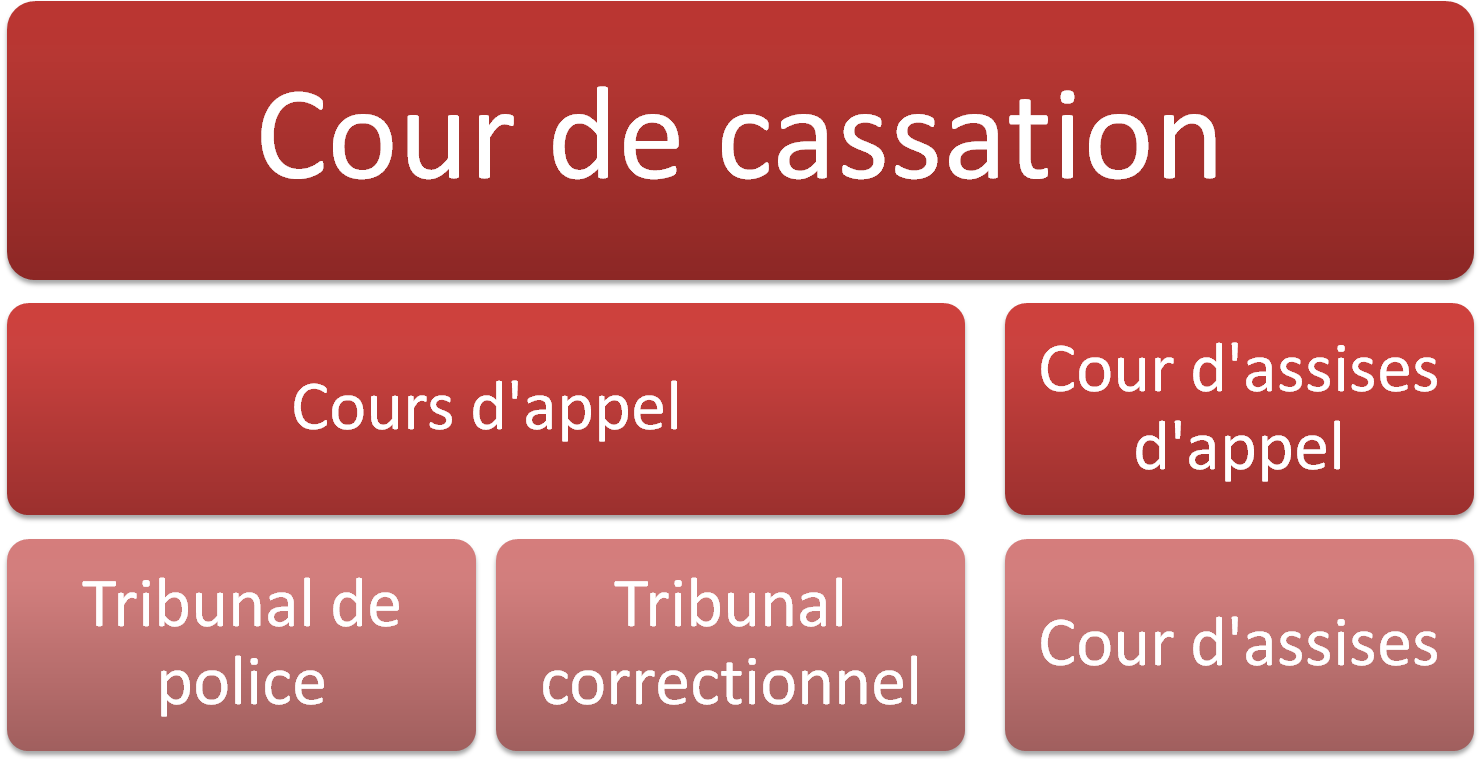
Organization of the French judiciary for criminal matters.

There are two categories of criminal jurisdiction: investigation (French: instruction) and judgement (jugement). This distinction is echoed by the French code of criminal procedure (Code de procédure pénale), which nevertheless does not define how to distinguish the one from the other. The distinction is even more nuanced since in French procedural law the "judgment" jurisdictions also have powers of investigation.

An investigation jurisdiction has powers of criminal investigation and can carry out or launch different investigations: it can hear witnesses and civil parties (parties civiles), search, seal, appoint an expert, put a suspect in temporary detention or in detention under judiciary supervision, and rule on the different questions that arise in the course of criminal investigation, such as the return of seized assets.

A judge in a court of judgment jurisdiction has the same powers, but generally makes only limited use of them, since the juge d'instruction has already done so. The essential function of a cour de judgement is to determine the guilt of defendants under criminal law and to sentence those it finds guilty.

Criminal jurisdictions judge criminal offenses (infractions), and they also determine the civil consequences of committing the offense.

==== Criminal ====
The tribunal de police judges contraventions. The tribunal correctionnel judges délits. The cour d'assises and the criminal tribunal (in Saint-Pierre-et-Miquelon) judge crimes, according to where they were committed. The commercial maritime tribunal is a jurisdiction d'exception, but it has been composed in the same way as jurisdictions of common law such as the correctional tribunal since the decision of the constitutional council of July 2, 2010.

==== Sentencing ====
The sentencing judge (juge de l'application des peines) and the sentencing court (tribunal de l'application des peines) decide the application of criminal penalties, especially with respect to prisoners.

Eight regional jurisdictions decide matters of preventive safety detention (rétention de sûreté) (Note: In French criminal law, security detention (rétention de sûreté; sometimes seen as "preventive detention" in English, though that can be confused with a different type of detention that goes by that name) is a procedure for placing certain prisoners who have served out their criminal sentence into a secure socio-medico-judicial facility. This is only applied to prisoners who present a very high risk of reoffending because they generally suffer from a serious personality disorder, and is limited to convictions for the most serious crimes, in particular sex crimes, and must be expressly provided for in the sentencing decision.) after a prisoner has served out their sentence, in the case of persons convicted of certain very serious offenses and judged still to be dangerous to society.

==== Military ====
The elimination of the tribunal aux armées de Paris, the last peacetime military tribunal, was announced for 2011, when they were to be replaced by the common-law correctional tribunal. It took effect 1 January 2012 as a result of the law of 13 December 2011.

==== Juvenile ====
Infractions committed by a minor are judged, depending on their severity and also the age of the minor, by the juge des enfants, by the tribunal pour enfants or by the Cour d'assises des mineurs.

== Second degree — appeals ==
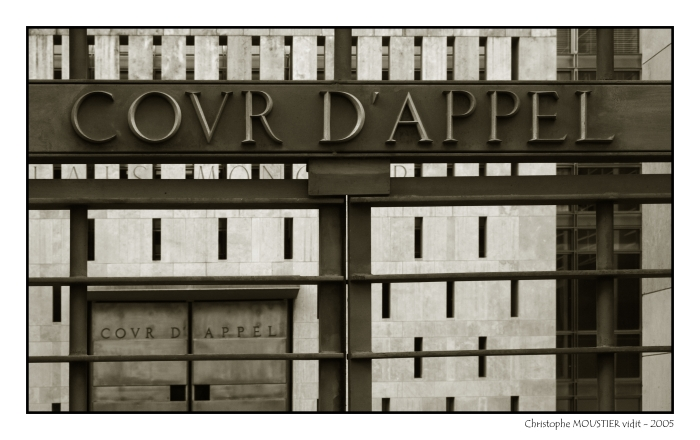
Court of Appeal in Aix-en-Provence.

=== Court of Appeal ===
The Court of Appeal retries the facts of a disputed case previously tried in a court of first instance. This is known as the double degree of jurisdiction (double degré de juridiction).

At the Court of Appeal level litigation is considered by a single court—although in separate divisions—whether the matter is civil or criminal. Depending on the volume of appeals the number of divisions may vary. There is always, however, at least one civil division, social division, commercial division, and correctional appeals division.

There are a total of 36 courts of appeal on French territory.

At the courts of appeal, in criminal law matters:

- the chambre de l'instruction is the appeal court's jurisdiction d'instruction;
- the chambre des appels correctionnels is the jurisdiction judgement d'appel, concerning délits and contraventions. For a contravention the case is heard by a single judge.
- the chambre de l'application des peines is an appeal jurisdiction for matters of sentencing, particularly if a loss of liberty is involved.

=== Superior court of appeal ===
Saint Pierre and Miquelon has a Superior court of appeal, which hears the appeals from that jurisdiction.

=== Criminal appeals ===
Since the 2000 presumption of innocence law, known as the "Guigou law", (Note: See presumption of innocence law in the glossary.) a special form of appeal (called tournant) been available against the arrêts of the Assises court, and the Criminal and Army tribunals: appeals are heard in a different criminal jurisdiction with additional jurés in the case of an Assises court or Criminal tribunal, or assesseurs-jurés in Mayotte). (Although appeals filed against a criminal jurisdiction ruling in an overseas department, New Caledonia, French Polynesia, Wallis and Futuna or Saint Pierre and Miquelon, the appeal may be heard in the same jurisdiction that heard it in first instance, but different judges should sit on the panel that re-tries the case.

=== Security detention ===
The judicial panel of the national jurisdiction for security detention is composed of three counselors from the Court of Cassation. It hears appeals of decisions to impose preventive detention on convicted prisoners who have completed their sentence but are still considered dangerous.

=== National court for disability and industrial accident insurance pricing ===
The jurisdiction of the National court for disability and industrial accident insurance pricing judges cases where appeals concern incapacitation and work-related injury, sometimes called technical appeals, rendered by the French Social Security administration.

== Court of Cassation ==
The Court of Cassation is the supreme court for civil and criminal cases in France. It does not constitute a third degree of jurisdiction, because unlike the Courts of Appeal, it only addresses the legal form of the verdict. Thus the juges du fond designation for first and second degree judges, which sometimes appears in cassation court verdicts.

The Cour de cassation renders two types of verdict: confirmatif or infirmatif.

The former confirms a verdict by a court of appeal, (or of another court if the case has exhausted the first and last degrees of jurisdiction). The trial theoretically ends at this point, all avenues of recourse having been exhausted. Still, other jurisdictions may be invoked, such as the European Court of Human Rights, but this remains rare.

If the court's verdict is on the other hand infirmatif, the judgment is "cassé", or broken, essentially quashed or canceled. There are then several possibilities:

- The judgment is quashed and sent back to a jurisdiction of the same degree as the one that issued the overturned judgment, but in a different place.
- The judgment is quashed and sent back to the same jurisdiction that issued it, but is then heard by a court composed of different judges.
- The judgment is quashed, but not sent back to the lower courts.

If the matter is sent back to the lower courts, both the facts and the law are retried. The resulting new judgment may also be appealed. The next higher court would be cassation. Here the bench sometimes quashes a verdict without returning it to the lower court, or where a lower court may bow to the Cour de cassation by rendering a judgment that takes the cassation court's ruling into account.

Unlike the Courts of Appeal, there is only one Cour de cassation, which sits in Paris.

== See also ==
- Assizes - obsolete court in come common law jurisdictions
- Court of cassation
- Crime in France - deals with frequency statistics for various offenses, not the legal concept of Crime in French law, which is analogous to "felony" in common law jurisdictions
- Declaration of the Rights of Man and of the Citizen
- Criminal intent in common law
- Judiciary of France
- Labor Court (France)
- Law in France
- Parlement
- Police Tribunal (France)
- Preventive detention (general)

== Notes and references ==
Notes

Citations
