= Public Prosecutor (France) =

French criminal prosecution official

Prosecutor of the Republic
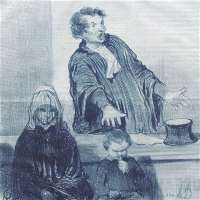
- A prosecutor requests a penalty during a hearing: caricature by Honoré Daumier.

Occupation
- Names: Procureure de la République
- Activity sectors: Law; Magistracy

Description
- Competencies: Civil procedure and Criminal procedure
- Education required: French National School for the Judiciary
- Related jobs: Judge; Investigating judge

In France, the Public Prosecutor is the magistrate of the public prosecutor's office responsible for criminal prosecution within the jurisdiction of a judicial court. The prosecutor is assisted by deputy prosecutors and assistant prosecutors, who are also magistrates, and together they form the prosecutor's office of a judicial court.

The French Ministry of Justice explains that:

the term "parquet" refers to the area where the magistrates of the public prosecutor's office were positioned: an enclosed space in the grand chamber, defined on three sides by the judges' seats and on the fourth by the bar, forming the heart of the courtroom—a sacred, enclosed space, a small park or parquet. It was crossed by the King's representatives to reach their place, and armed officers advanced there to report their investigations and draw up the official record for the parquet..

== History ==
The role of the prosecutor emerged in the 14th century within the legal profession, at the request of the parliaments. Its title and functions were inspired by procedures developed within the courts of the Inquisition.

As Jean-Louis Nadal, Prosecutor General at the Court of Cassation, recalled in his opening speech at the symposium on 19 January 2006:

From a historical perspective, the unique role of the public prosecutor's office, both as a prosecuting body and a guardian of individual freedoms, can be traced back, to my knowledge, to the great ordinance of Philip the Fair of 23, which outlined the oath of the King's representatives, demonstrating that the prosecutor must also be responsible for seeking the truth and ensuring the proper application of the law..

== Status ==
=== Membership in the magistracy ===
Prosecutors of the Republic and their deputies, as well as prosecutors general, their respective deputies, advocates general, judges, and justice auditors, are part of the magistracy. They are therefore subject to the provisions of the ordinance of 22 establishing the organic law on the status of the magistracy.

=== Hierarchical principle ===
Unlike judges, the prosecutor, along with their deputies, is part of the "standing magistracy," so named because its members stand during hearings to present their requisitions, in contrast to the Sitting magistracy (or Judicial bench), whose members, the judges, remain seated throughout the proceedings.

Several factors distinguish them from judicial bench magistrates in their status. Article 5 of the aforementioned ordinance states:

The magistrates of the prosecutor's office are placed under the direction and control of their hierarchical superiors and under the authority of the Keeper of the Seals, Minister of Justice. During hearings, their speech is free.

Thus, the prosecutor's office is hierarchical, meaning that the Public Prosecutor has authority over their deputies and is, in turn, subject to the instructions and directives of the Prosecutor General at the court of appeal within their jurisdiction. All members of the prosecutor's office are ultimately accountable to the Keeper of the Seals, Minister of Justice, and thus to the executive branch.

While judicial bench magistrates are appointed with the binding opinion of the High Council of the Judiciary under Article 28 of the ordinance, prosecutor's office magistrates are appointed based on a non-binding opinion, which does not constrain the Keeper of the Seals.

Like judicial bench magistrates, Prosecutors of the Republic are appointed by decree of the President of the Republic. Prosecutors General, however, are appointed by decree in the Council of Ministers.

As a result of the hierarchical structure of the prosecutor's office, prosecutors and their deputies do not benefit from the immovability guarantee afforded to judicial bench magistrates. However, the 1958 ordinance grants them freedom of speech during hearings to present requisitions they deem appropriate, including requests for discharge or acquittal.

From a statutory perspective, the Public Prosecutor is a magistrate of the "first grade" (or "outside hierarchy" for larger courts). This means that appointment as a Public Prosecutor is only possible after being listed on the first-grade advancement table (after at least 7 years of career). In practice, the magistrate will typically have held at least one first-grade position (e.g., assistant prosecutor or deputy president) before being appointed prosecutor.

=== Attire ===
Like judicial bench magistrates, Prosecutors of the Republic wear attire specified in Table 1, annexed to the Code of Judicial Organization. For the Court of Cassation and Courts of Appeal, this consists of a black robe for regular hearings and a red robe for solemn hearings. In other jurisdictions, a black robe is worn. Deputies typically wear only the black robe.

=== European Court of Human Rights ruling ===
On 10, the European Court of Human Rights, in its Medvedyev 1 ruling, determined that the prosecutor cannot be considered a judicial authority under Article 5 of the Convention:

The Prosecutor of the Republic is not a 'judicial authority' as understood in the Court's case law: as the applicants point out, the prosecutor notably lacks independence from the executive branch to be so qualified.

=== Responsibilities ===
==== In criminal matters ====
In France, the Public Prosecutor has a dual role: a "political" mission and a sovereign mission. Their responsibilities are defined in the Code of Criminal Procedure.

===== Political mission =====
As a member of the judicial hierarchy, the Prosecutor must implement the government's criminal policy, pursuant to, among others, Article 30 of the Code of Criminal Procedure:

The Minister of Justice conducts the criminal prosecution policy determined by the Government. They ensure its consistent application across the Republic. To this end, they issue general criminal prosecution instructions to the magistrates of the public prosecutor's office.

Thus, based on government priorities, such as road safety, prevention of violence against individuals, or combating terrorism, the prosecutor will redirect the efforts of their office, reporting to the General Prosecutor. In recent years, successive governments have implemented "urban policies" in which prosecutor's offices are sometimes closely involved, through prosecutors' participation in local bodies, awareness campaigns, and educational initiatives in schools.

===== Sovereign mission =====
The responsibilities of the Public Prosecutor are outlined in Articles 1 and 31 of the Code of Criminal Procedure:

- Criminal prosecution for the enforcement of penalties is initiated and conducted by magistrates or officials to whom it is entrusted by law.
- The public prosecutor's office conducts criminal prosecution and requests the application of the law.

The prosecutor's mission involves identifying and investigating offences (contraventions, misdemeanors, and crimes) and deciding on the appropriate course of action under Article 40-1:

When they consider that the facts brought to their attention under Article 40 constitute an offence committed by a person whose identity and residence are known, and for which no legal provision prevents the initiation of criminal prosecution, the territorially competent Public Prosecutor decides whether it is appropriate:

- 1° To initiate prosecution;
- 2° To implement an alternative procedure to prosecution under Articles 41-1 or 41-2;
- 3° To close the case without further action if the specific circumstances of the offence justify it.

In the French judicial system, under the principle of discretionary prosecution, the Public Prosecutor has sole authority to determine the course of action for an offence, subject to the Prosecutor General's independent powers within the jurisdiction.

====== Initiating prosecution ======
In this context, the Public Prosecutor, who holds the powers of a judicial police officer, oversees the activities of judicial police officers and agents within their jurisdiction.

As such:

- They must be informed of crimes and misdemeanors committed in flagrante, direct necessary investigations, and oversee police custody measures, authorizing extensions (Arts. 53 to 74-2, Code of Criminal Procedure).
- They order and direct preliminary investigations for non-flagrant cases (Arts. 75 to 78, Code of Criminal Procedure).
- They decide to open a judicial investigation by referring the case to an investigating judge, mandatorily for criminal matters, optionally for misdemeanor matters unless otherwise provided by law, or even for contravention matters (Arts. 79 and 80, Code of Criminal Procedure).

When investigations lead to the referral of an alleged offender to a trial court (police court, criminal courts, assize court), the Public Prosecutor, personally or through their deputies, represents the public prosecutor's office to present appropriate requisitions. Under Article L122-4 of the Code of Judicial Organization:

Any magistrate of a prosecutor's office or general prosecutor's office may perform the functions of the public prosecutor's office within that office.

This reflects the principle of indivisibility of the prosecutor's office, meaning any magistrate in the office can perform procedural acts. This principle applies generally and is not limited to specific matters.

====== Alternatives to prosecution ======
Based on the nature of the offence and resulting harm, the Public Prosecutor may opt for alternatives to prosecution:

- Under Article 41-1 of the Code of Criminal Procedure:

If it appears that such a measure is likely to ensure compensation for the victim's harm, end the disturbance caused by the offence, or contribute to the offender's rehabilitation, the Prosecutor of the Republic may, before deciding on criminal prosecution, directly or through a judicial police officer, a prosecutor's delegate, or a mediator:

1º Remind the offender of their legal obligations; 2º Refer the offender to a health, social, or professional organization (...); 3º Request the offender to regularize their situation under the law or regulations; 4º Request the offender to repair the harm caused by the offence; 5º With the parties' consent, initiate mediation between the offender and the victim; 6º In cases of offences committed against a spouse, partner, or their children, request the offender to reside outside the family home or residence, avoid appearing near it, and, if necessary, undergo health, social, or psychological support; (...) This procedure suspends the statute of limitations for criminal prosecution. (...)

If the measure is not executed due to the offender's behavior, the Public Prosecutor, absent new elements, implements a penal composition or initiates prosecution.

- Under Article 41-2 of the Code of Criminal Procedure. This involves penal composition, allowing the Public Prosecutor, for certain contraventions and misdemeanors, to propose one or more obligations to the offender. The accused may be assisted by a lawyer. The accepted penal composition is submitted for validation by the president of the judicial court.

Unlike the alternative measure under Article 41-1, which suspends the statute of limitations, the full execution of a penal composition, recorded in the No. 1 bulletin of the criminal record, extinguishes criminal prosecution, equivalent to an executed sentence.

- Under Article 44-1 of the Code of Criminal Procedure. Introduced by Law No. 2007-297 of 5 March 2007, this provision grants the mayor the power to negotiate with offenders for contraventions identified by municipal police under Article L2212-5 of the General Code of Local Authorities. The accepted transaction is submitted for approval by the Public Prosecutor (except for community service, which requires judicial approval).

====== Case closure without further action ======
The Public Prosecutor is not obligated to pursue prosecution for an offence and may decide to close a case without further action for reasons such as:

- Absence of a criminal offence
- Insufficient evidence
- Inability to identify the alleged offender(s)
- Amnesty or expiration of the statute of limitations (Arts. 6 to 10, Code of Criminal Procedure).

Under Article 40-2 of the Code of Criminal Procedure, the prosecutor must notify complainants of a decision to close a case without further action, specifying the legal or discretionary reasons justifying it.

==== In civil matters ====
This is the least known function to the general public but remains highly significant.

The civil and administrative responsibilities of a prosecutor's office are managed by the civil service within the judicial court, where the prosecutor's office is based. These include handling matters related to:

- Conciliators of justice (Decree No. 78-381 of 20 March 1978).
- Judicial experts (Decree No. 2004-1463 of 23 December 2004).
- Guardianship managers.
- Oversight of civil registry services (Art. 53, Civil Code).
- Disciplinary sanctions for pharmacists, medical biologists, and dentists (Art. L4124-2, Public Health Code).
- Jurisdictional challenges (Decree of 27 February 2015).
- International judicial assistance in civil and commercial matters.
- Civil aspects of international child abduction.
- Posthumous marriages (Art. 171, Civil Code).
- Annulment of marriages (Arts. 180 et seq., Civil Code).
- Nationality cases (Title I bis, Civil Code).
- Inspections and oversight of psychiatric institutions and disputes over requests to lift compulsory placements (Art. L3211-6 et seq., Public Health Code).
- Adoptions (Arts. 343 et seq., Civil Code).
- Enforcement of foreign judgments (Arts. 509 et seq., Code of Civil Procedure).
- Incapacitated adults (Arts. 490 et seq., Civil Code).

Additionally, the civil service manages relations with labor courts.

Under Articles 421 to 429 of the Code of Civil Procedure, the prosecutor's office may—and in some cases must—intervene as a principal or joined party in civil proceedings through written submissions handled by the civil service. Articles 423 and 424 specify that the public prosecutor's office may act as a principal party "to defend public order in response to facts that undermine it" and as a joined party "to provide its opinion on the application of the law in a case it has been notified of."

==== In constitutional matters ====
The role of the Public Prosecutor in addressing priority constitutional questions is limited to providing an opinion. They must be informed of each question raised and may provide an opinion through oral requisitions or a written submission. If the opinion is a separate, reasoned written document, it is forwarded to the Court of Cassation if the question is referred. Between 1 September 2010 and 1 September 2011, the prosecutor provided a favorable opinion in 55% of cases referred to the Court of Cassation for priority constitutional questions.

==== In the media ====
As an exception to the principle of confidentiality of investigations, the Public Prosecutor may, "on their own initiative or at the request of the investigating court or parties, disclose objective procedural elements that do not assess the merits of charges against the accused" to "prevent the spread of incomplete or inaccurate information or to address a disturbance to public order."

This provision was introduced by the law of 15 June 2000 strengthening the protection of the presumption of innocence and victims' rights. Previously, journalists relied on investigating judges. Communication with the media is now part of prosecutors' continuing education.

=== Specific responsibilities of the Prosecutor General ===
The Prosecutor General has the following exclusive prerogatives:

- 1. Right to file an appeal beyond the appeal deadline available to the Public Prosecutor.

While the Public Prosecutor has a 10-day period from the pronouncement of a judgment by the police court (where appeal is available) or correctional court to file an appeal, the Prosecutor General has a 20-day period under Articles 548 and 505 of the Code of Criminal Procedure. This right is exclusive, meaning it can be exercised even if the Public Prosecutor waived their right to appeal.

- 2. Ability to be seized by a complainant through a hierarchical appeal in case of a complaint closed without further action by the Public Prosecutor.

This right is granted to complainants under Article 40-3 of the Code of Criminal Procedure.

- 3. Right to initiate criminal prosecution.

While the initiation of public action is typically the responsibility of the Public Prosecutor, the Prosecutor General, as their hierarchical superior, may, under Article 36 of the Code of Criminal Procedure, "instruct Prosecutors of the Republic, through written instructions included in the case file, to initiate or have initiated prosecutions or to refer such written requisitions to the competent court as the Prosecutor General deems appropriate."

These provisions highlight the hierarchical nature of the prosecutor's office, further reinforced by the Prosecutor General's authority to directly requisition public forces, whose members, including agents and judicial police officers, are under their supervision (Arts. 35 and 36, Code of Criminal Procedure).

== See also ==
- Judge
- Public prosecutor's office

== Bibliography ==
- Érick Maurel (2008). Words of a Prosecutor. Témoins. Paris: Gallimard. p. 283. ISBN 978-2-07-011977-6.
- Jean-Marie Carbasse (2000). History of the Prosecutor's Office. Law and Justice. Paris: PUF. p. 333. ISBN 978-2-13-050830-4.
- Catherine Denys (2003). "Jean-Marie Carbasse (Ed.), History of the Prosecutor's Office, Paris, PUF, 2000, 333 p., €22.56". Revue d'histoire moderne et contemporaine. 50 (1): 180. doi:10.3917/rhmc.501.0180.
- Philip Milburn, Denis Salas, Katia Kostulski (2010). Prosecutors: Between Judicial Vocation and Political Functions. PUF. p. 240. ISBN 978-2-13-058213-7.
