= Court of appeal (France) =

French court of second instance

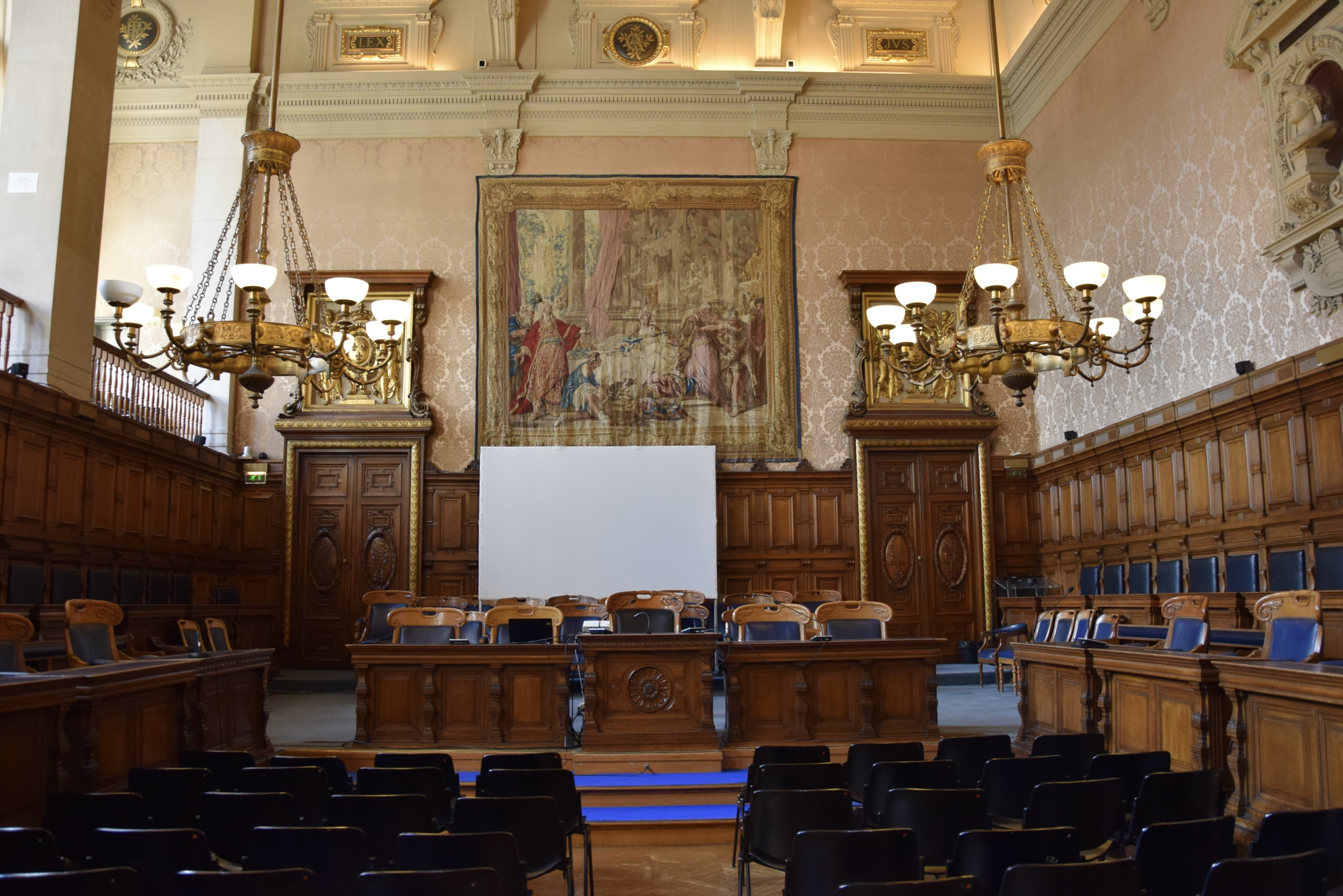
A courtroom in the Court of Appeal of Paris, the busiest court of appeal in France

In France, a cour d'appel ([kuʁ dapɛl]; court of appeal) of the ordre judiciaire (judiciary) is a juridiction de droit commun du second degré, an appellate court of general jurisdiction. It reviews the judgments of a tribunal judiciaire. When one of the parties is not satisfied with the trial court's judgment, the party can file an appeal. While decisions of a court of first instance are termed "jugements" in French, a court of appeal hands down an arrêt (decision on appeal), which may either affirm or reverse the judgment of the court below. An arrêt (judgment) of the court of appeal may be further appealed en cassation. If the appeal is admissible at the cour de cassation, that court does not re-judge the facts of the matter a third time, but may investigate and verify whether the rules of law were properly applied by the lower courts.

French territories currently contain 36 courts of appeal, six of which are overseas, and a tribunal supérieur d'appel on Saint-Pierre-et-Miquelon.

In France itself, each court governs several départements or similar territories, generally two to four. The courts are often established in the same cities as the former Parlements, the court jurisdictions of the Ancien Régime.

== History ==
These courts were created under the name of tribunal d'appel (appeal tribunal) by the loi du 27 ventôse an VIII (law of March 18, 1800), which put an end to the "appel circulaire" which had been put in place in 1790.

The "appeal tribunals" became "courts of appeal" through the sénatus-consulte of 28 floréal an XII (May 18, 1804) and took the name "imperial courts" in 1810. Their name changed afterwards according to the régime:

- "imperial court" during the First and Second Empire,
- "royal court" during the Restoration and the July Monarchy, and
- "court of appeal" during periods of republic, and as they are still known.

Until 1958, appeals of judgments of a juge de paix, justice of the peace, and labor courts (de prud'hommes) were brought before the tribunal civil (civil tribunal), while a tribunal d'arrondissement existed for appeals from tribunaux paritaires des baux ruraux and a regional commission of sécurité sociale to appeal the decisions of the first instance. Courts of appeal only recognize, in civil matters, recourse against the judgment of a civil tribunal or a commercial tribunal. In penal matters, courts of appeal accept correctional and police tribunal appeals.

With the reform of 1958, the courts of appeals became the only appellate courts for the ordinary court system. The exceptions (assizes appeal court, National Court of incapacity and of workplace injury et National court to retain safety) were re-created afterwards.

== Organisation ==
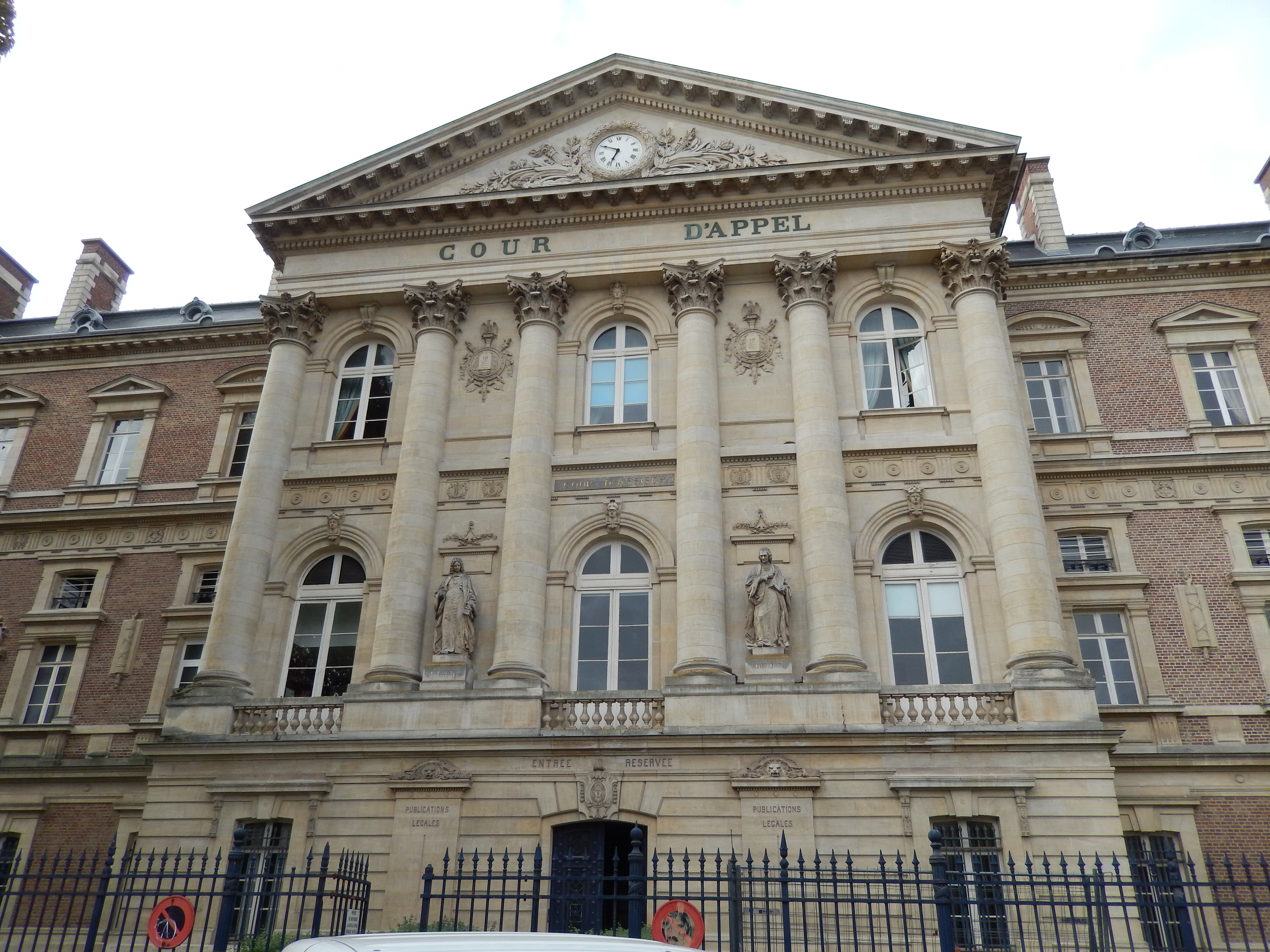
Court of Appeal of Amiens

The magistrates of the court of appeal are generally experienced jurists who began their careers in a first-degree jurisdiction. Each court of appeal is presided over by a "premier président" (also known as the "chef de cour"). The other magistrates du siège are chamber presidents and the counselors, names which recall the parlements of the Ancien Régime. At the court of appeal the vice-présidents and the judges assigned to the first president are affected and can exercise their functions either at the court of appeal or in any related tribunal in that scope. The first president, the chamber presidents and the counselors of the court of appeal are the only magistrates who can preside at assizes courts.

The magistrates of the parquet général are a prosecutor-general (procureur général or chef de parquet), attorneys-general and substituts généraux. Le procureur général oversees the application of criminal law throughout the court of appeal's jurisdiction, within which it assures proper functioning of the parquets. A procureur général or his substitut represent the ministère public before the cour d'assise (Assize Court) sitting at the court of appeal

Each court is structured into a variable number of chambers, several of which may be specialized. A court of appeal at a minimum includes:

- a correctional appeal chamber,
- a chamber of ''instruction'',
- a chamber for penalty imposition,
- a social chamber,
- a special chamber for minors,
- Other chambers generally include at least one commercial chamber and one civil chamber.

Courts of appeal include a clerk's office staffed with civil servants.

== Judgment formation ==
Collegial judgments are composed by three magistrates

- the first president
- a president of chamber
- and a councillor

(or president of chamber and two councillors) in the usual formation. The solemn formation consists of five magistrates and is notably used n cases sent back down from the court of cassation In rare cases, the court of appeal meets in the form of an "assembly of chambers" which comprises the magistrates of two chambers (three for the Paris Court of Appeals).

== Attributions ==
=== Jurisdictional attributions ===
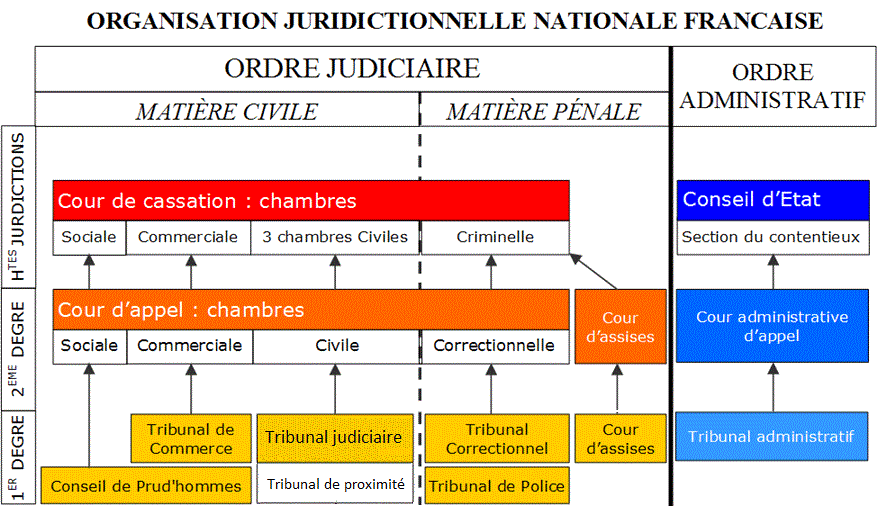
Courts of Appeal in the French judiciary.

Procedure (simplified) of an appeal and of an appeal en cassation

The court of appeal recognizes appeals of matters previously brought before the relevant tribunals, (du ressort), both civil and penal:

- tribunal d'instance
  - police tribunals
- tribunal de grande instance
  - juge d'instruction
  - judge of freedoms and of detention
  - correctional tribunal
  - judge of penalty imposition
- commercial tribunal
- labour council
- joint agricultural land tribunal
- Social security tribunal

It is also the venue for recourse against bar association elections and some bar association decisions, as well as the decisions of other professional associations (ordres professionnels) of the French legal system.

The Court of Appeal of Paris is competent to hear matters of recourse against the decisions of certain independent administrative regulation authorities (Autorité de la concurrence, Autorité des marchés financiers, Autorité de régulation des communications électroniques, des postes et de la distribution de la presse...).

In the court of assizes, since the 2000 law on the presumption of innocence, an assize appeal court is not a second degree court but a different assize, in another département and with nine jurors instead of six.

Not all matters can be appealed and thus some cannot be re-judged on appeal, for example the least important litigation. In this case the pourvoi en cassation remains possible.

=== Administrative assignments ===
The first president of the court of appeal and the prosecutor general, possibly assisted by other magistrates, participate in the administration and the inspection of the jurisdictions in the court's responsibility. They therefore have a qualité d'ordonnateur and are responsible for public markets. They are assisted, in these assignments, by the regional administrative service.

== List and jurisdictions of courts of appeal ==
Jurisdictions of courts of appeal of France

Court of appeal	Departments or territories in its jurisdiction
Agen	Gers, Lot and Lot-et-Garonne
Aix-en-Provence	Alpes-de-Haute-Provence, Alpes-Maritimes, Bouches-du-Rhône and Var
Amiens	Aisne, Oise and Somme
Angers	Maine-et-Loire, Mayenne and Sarthe
Basse-Terre	Guadeloupe, Saint Barthélemy and Saint Martin
Bastia	Corse-du-Sud and Haute-Corse
Besançon	Doubs, Haute-Saône, Jura and Territory of Belfort
Bordeaux	Charente, Dordogne and Gironde
Bourges	Cher, Indre and Nièvre
Caen	Calvados, Manche and Orne
Cayenne	French Guiana
Chambéry	Savoie and Haute-Savoie
Colmar	Haut-Rhin and Bas-Rhin
Dijon	Côte-d'Or, Haute-Marne and Saône-et-Loire
Douai	Nord and Pas-de-Calais
Fort-de-France	Martinique
Grenoble	Drôme, Hautes-Alpes and Isère
Limoges	Corrèze, Creuse and Haute-Vienne
Lyon	Ain, Loire, Rhône and Metropolis of Lyon
Metz	Moselle
Montpellier	Aude, Aveyron, Hérault and Pyrénées-Orientales
Nancy	Meurthe-et-Moselle, Meuse and Vosges
Nîmes	Ardèche, Gard, Lozère, Vaucluse
Nouméa	New Caledonia and Wallis and Futuna
Orléans	Indre-et-Loire, Loir-et-Cher and Loiret
Papeete	French Polynesia
Paris	Essonne, Paris, Seine-et-Marne, Yonne, Seine-Saint-Denis and Val-de-Marne
Pau	Hautes-Pyrénées, Landes and Pyrénées-Atlantiques
Poitiers	Charente-Maritime, Deux-Sèvres, Vendée and Vienne
Reims	Ardennes, Aube and Marne
Rennes	Côtes-d'Armor, Finistère, Ille-et-Vilaine, Loire-Atlantique and Morbihan
Riom	Allier, Cantal, Haute-Loire and Puy-de-Dôme
Rouen	Eure and Seine-Maritime
Saint-Denis	Réunion, Mayotte and French Southern and Antarctic Lands
Saint-Pierre	Saint Pierre and Miquelon
Toulouse	Ariège, Haute-Garonne, Tarn and Tarn-et-Garonne
Versailles	Eure-et-Loir, Hauts-de-Seine, Val-d'Oise and Yvelines

== See also ==
- Judiciary of France
- Cour d'assises
- Police Court (France)
- Tribunal correctionnel (France)
- Ministère public (France) - has some but not all characteristics of a prosecutor in common law jurisdictions
- Court of Appeal or Cour d'appel redirect to Appellate court, which deal with common law appeal jurisdictions, which differ considerably from French appeal procedures
- Court of Cassation (France)
- Court of Cassation - deals with common-law jurisdictions, which differ considerably from French appeal procedures
