= Colloquy (law) =

Legal concept

In law, a colloquy is a routine, highly formalized conversation. Conversations among the judge and lawyers (as opposed to testimony under oath) are colloquies. The term may be applied to the conversation that takes place when a defendant enters into a plea bargain and the judge is supposed to verify that the defendant understands that he is waiving his right to a jury trial.

In criminal court, a colloquy is an investigation within a defendant's plea to reassure that the plea was given "knowingly, voluntarily, and intelligently". The defendant needs to understand the charges against him, the penalties that he will face, and his rights before entering into a guilty plea. In the US, that includes describing the rights guaranteed by the Fifth and Sixth Amendments of the Constitution as well as a caution that non-citizens who are convicted of crimes risk expulsion from the country. In appellate advocacy, back and forth between judges and attorneys are often referred to colloquies.

A defendant who denies guilt may still "plead down"—plead to a lesser offense than the accusation—provided the Court allows it and provided the accused intelligently concludes on an open record that a plea is in her/his best interest (such as avoiding incarceration or a more serious charge/conviction).

== See also ==
- Comminatory
- Contravention
