= Ministère public =

- For most common law jurisdictions, see: Attorney general
- For France, see: Ministère public (France)
