= Tribunal d'instance =

Type of French lower court

In France prior to 2020, the Tribunal d'instance (literally "Court of First Instance") was a judicial lower court of record of first instance for general civil suits and included a criminal division, the Police Court (tribunal de police), which heard cases of misdemeanors or summary offences (contraventions). Since it had original jurisdiction, the Court's rulings could be appealed to a French appellate court or Supreme Court. Prior to 1958, the court was known as a Justice of the Peace Court (justice de paix) until the judicial restructuring of 1958. The court was merged with the Tribunal de grande instance to form the Tribunal judiciaire in 2020.

In the Court, proceedings were conducted based on oral testimony and arguments, and, unlike in higher courts, legal counsel is not mandatory.

Other judicial courts of original jurisdiction were:

- Magistrate courts (juge de proximité) - for small claims and petty misdemeanors (since 1 July 2017 these claims now fall under the jurisdiction of the tribunal d'instance)
- High courts (tribunal de grande instance) - handled complex suits and had a criminal section, the Criminal Court (tribunal correctionnel), that hears cases involving lesser felonies (délits).
- Commercial court (Tribunal de commerce)
- Employment Tribunal (Conseil des prud'hommes)
- Agricultural Land Tribunal (tribunal paritaire des baux ruraux)
- Social security tribunal (tribunal des affaires de sécurité sociale). These were eliminated in 2020.

== Degrees of jurisdiction ==
As a general rule, the French court system is divided into three degrees of jurisdiction:

- Original or general jurisdiction for the first hearing of cases;
- Appellate jurisdiction for appeals from lower courts;
- Courts of last resort for appeals from appellate courts on the interpretation of law.

== Duties ==
The Court has civil jurisdiction over personal property claims, monetary claims not exceeding €10,000, and other civil actions for which the court has exclusive jurisdiction, those being:

- Private property leases
- Disputes relating to the elections of personnel delegates.
- the distance questions and height of the plantations.
- the movable credit to the consumption up to €21,500.
- Asset seizure
- Defamation suits
- Guardianship of minors and disabled persons
- Voter registration

Claims over 10,000 euros, unless in the above exclusive areas of law, fall under the civil jurisdiction of superior courts.

== See also ==
- Justice in France
- Court of Cassation (France)
- Cour d'assises
- Juge d'instruction
