= Tribunal de commerce =

French courts handling commercial cases

Coordinates: 48.8559°N 2.3468°E

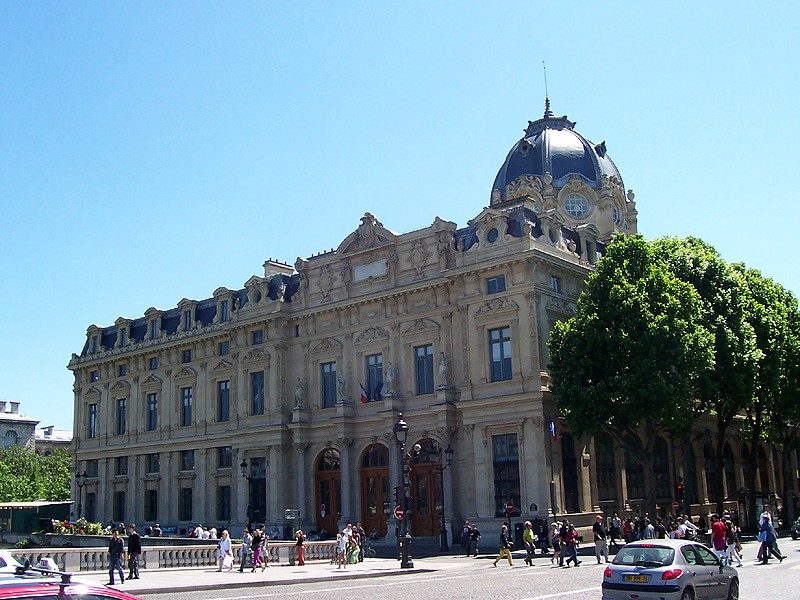
Tribunal de commerce de Paris, 2009.

In France, the tribunal de commerce (plural tribunaux de commerce, literally "commercial courts") are the oldest courts in the French judicial organization. They were created at the end of the Middle Ages.

The commercial court has jurisdiction over commercial cases: disputes between merchants, disputes over commercial acts, controversies involving commercial corporations, and bankruptcy proceedings.

The judges of the commercial courts are not career judges but elected traders. They are elected for terms of two or four years by an electoral college made up of current and former judges of the commercial courts and traders’ delegates (délégués consulaires), who are themselves traders elected in the area within the jurisdiction of the court.

There are 134 commercial courts in France.

== See also ==
- Justice in France
- French criminal law
- French criminal code - distinguish from French code of criminal procedure
- Court of Appeals - in common law jurisdictions; does not apply in France - See Court of Appeal (France) for appeals under French (civil) law
- Court of Appeal (France) - differs considerably from common law jurisdictions - See Court of Appeals for appeals in common law
- Cour d'assise
- Court of Cassation -general discussion
- Court of Cassation (France)
- Tribunal de grande instance (France)
- Police Tribunal (France)
