= Contravention in French criminal law =

Lowest-level offense in French criminal law

In French criminal law, a contravention is the least serious among three categories of offenses. It includes non-criminal offenses, such as parking tickets, trespassing, minor violence, or destruction of property. The penalty is a fine stipulated by regulation, sometimes augmented with a supplementary penalty such as a remedial driving workshop.

== Background ==
Criminal offenses (French: infraction) are divided into three categories, according to increasing severity: contravention, délit (Note: Délit – Sometimes translated as felony in English sources, but not quite accurate, as a crime is also a felony. It should be particularly noted that the English word delict is a term from civil law not criminal law, and in common law systems, and thus is not a valid translation for the French délit.) and crime. (Note: Crime – Pronounced like the English word cream. Because of the three-way division of French infractions, this is not an exact synonym of the English word with the same spelling, as a crime involves only infractions punishable by a sentence of three years or more. The English word "crime" thus overlaps the meanings of both French terms crime, as well as délit.) The latter two categories are determined by the legislature, while contraventions are the responsibility of the executive branch. This tripartite division is matched by the courts responsible for enforcing criminal law: the Police court for contraventions; the Correctional court for délits; the cour d'assises for crimes.

Each type of offense has a court with jurisdiction (compétence) over it, and each type has a different statute of limitations that applies to it; ten years for a crime, three years for a délit, and one year for a contravention. Limitation periods are longer for offenses against minors.

== Definition ==
A contravention is a non-criminal offense (such as a parking ticket) and is handled by the Police court (tribunal de police). They are mainly related to violations of traffic law, and low-grade violence.

Examples: defamation, defacing or destruction of property; failure to respond to a summons; minor violence; trespassing on school property, or selling alcohol to minors.

== Procedure ==
Contraventions are handled in Police court, and are tried by a single judge.

== Classes ==
Contraventions are divided into five classes according to their severity, with class 1 being the least serious, and class 5 the most serious. The least serious offenses are also the most common ones, for example not wearing your seatbelt, failing to use your turn signal when required, speeding, and not having the proper papers with you while driving. Most contraventions are driving offenses, but there are others, such as not having proper permits for hunting, or wearing a veil in a public place. (Note: Wearing a veil in public: see Laïcité (secularism in France).)

== Penalties ==
Contraventions are subject to fines based on written regulations, and are not determined by the judge. Fines for contraventions range from 38 euros for the least serious, up to 1,500 euros for class five, which is doubled for repeat offenders (récidive).

Fines (amende) are the chief method of punishment for contraventions, but may be accompanied by supplementary penalties (peine complémentaire), such as suspension of one's driving license, immobilization of the vehicle, obligatory safe-driving or citizenship workshop, or forfeiture of one's hunting license.

== Types ==
=== Traffic offenses ===
The majority of traffic offenses are handled administratively and automatically (suspension of driver's license or adjustment of "points", in particular), but judges are sometimes required to issue fines. The fine incurred does not exceed €3,000.

== See also ==
- Crime
- Crime in France
- Glossary of French criminal law
- Police tribunal (France)
