= Ministère public (France) =

Public prosecution service of France

In French law, the ministère public or le parquet is the authority charged with defending the interests of society and of the application of law. It is primarily made up of magistrates, but is sometimes represented by other persons such as police officials. Its magistrates can be referred to as "standing" magistrates, as opposed to magistrats du siège (seated magistrates). Its closest equivalent in some English-speaking countries is the (office of the) director of public prosecutions and the attorney general in others.

The term ministère public translates literally as "public ministry" and that institution can exercise a public action (action publique) in penal infractions that cause a disturbance of the ordre public, and can also initiate prosecutions or non-prosecutions. It can intervene in all jurisdictions of the judiciary, but has never really exercised the same role in the administrative areas, except for financial venues (juridictions financières).

== Terminology ==
In France, the ministère public (in the person of an Attorney-general, a procureur de la République or one of his substituts or representatives) is designated as "le parquet" in legal jargon. The word parquet itself may have stemmed from the Old French, where it meant a "small park or enclosure". The term "parquet" goes back to the medieval expression "parquet des Gens du Roi". The origin of this use and meaning of the word is not known with certainty, but the most probable hypothesis is that these magistrates were separated from the magistrates du siège in a sort of "park".

The location of the ministère public has been called the "parquet" because in the Great Chamber (la Grand-Chambre) of Paris the enclosure delimited on three sides by the seats of judges and on the fourth by a barre or handrail, this heart of the room, a closed and dedicated space,(sacré), a small parc or parquet, that the people of the king (les gens du roi) crossed to take their places and where the gens d'armes, gendarmes, came forward to relate the findings of their investigations, to erect (en dresser) the procès-verbal.

The name "standing magistracy" ("magistrature debout"), comes from the fact that ministère public magistrates formerly stood to speak, notably when prenant les réquisitions, asking for a sentence, unlike the magistrats du siège, seated magistrates, who remained seated for the entire hearing.

== History ==
The ministère public first appears as a concept at the end of the 18th century, when the kings of France caused their interests to be defended by procureurs, or prosecutors, who little by little put themselves exclusively at the service of the kings. The parquet modeled itself little by little with procureurs, prosecutors, avocats, lawyers and substituts, designations which remain in contemporary French justice.

Prior to the French Revolution, the ministère public was embodied by officers called the Gens du roi (King's men), so that the Attorney-General of the king was the key role of the parlements of the Ancien Régime.

The question of whether to keep the ministère public arose at the time of the Revolution, but this was resolved in the affirmative by the law of the 16th and 24 August 1790, notably in article 8 of title II. The First Republic reprised the idea as the accusateur public, or public accuser. Until 1970, jurisdictions existed which had a parquet, in general the penal jurisdictions and the civil common law jurisdictions, and jurisdictions with no parquet existed as well, the juridictions d'exception non répressives such as the council de prud'hommes for example. Article 3 of law n^{o} 70-613, the law of the 10th of July 1970, authorised the prosecutor of the Republic to exercise public action before all first degree jurisdictions

The drive to install a ministère public before administrative jurisdictions other than the Cour des comptes was translated by the ordinances of February 2 and March 12, 1831, which created the function of "government commissioner" before the Conseil d'État. Not until 1862 were government commissioners introduced to les conseils de préfecture. Given that administrative justice works differently, the absence of hierarchy between the commissioners and a more rapid passage from the function of « commissaire du gouvernement » to that of judge, these persons never really exercised the role d'un ministère public, except in comparison to a public minister (ministère public) of the Cour de cassation The government rebaptized "rapporteurs publics" in 2009.

== In the judiciary ==
=== Principles of organisation ===
==== Indivisibility of the parquet ====
One of the specifics of the parquet is that it is indivisible: each member represents the whole and the members are thus interchangeables. Any action by a member commits the entire parquet. In a trial, the magistrates of the parquet may mutually replace one another without stopping the proceedings, which is forbidden to the magistrates du siège results in their case of nullity of the judgment.

==== Non-responsibility of the parquet ====
Another specific is the non-responsibility of the parquet; a magistrate of the parquet is responsible only for his own mistakes but cannot be assigned court costs as another plaintiff might after losing a trial. He cannot be prosecuted for either injury or defamation caused by what he says in a hearing. Personal faults tied to public service can on the other hand be prosecuted by virtue of the State's power of recourse, but only in front of the civil chamber of the Cour de cassation.

=== Organisation and personnel ===
The magistrates who compose it are the same as those of the siège (chair). Generally a magistrate, in the course of his career, will carry out the functions of the chair as well as of the parquet.

Tribunal de grande instance	Court of Appeal	Court of Cassation	
Second grade	Substitut for the Prosecutor of the Republic; Substitut for the prosecutor-general (Note: or assistant prosecutor assigned to substitute in the purview of the court of appeal)		
First grade	Vice-prosecutor of the Republic; Vice-prosecutor of the Republic placed with the attorney-general, First vice-prosecutors of the Republic; Procureur de la République adjoint; Procureur de la République	Substitute for the prosecutor-general (Note: Called substitut général)	
Outside the hierarchy	Adjunct Prosecutor of the Republic (Note: Dans les 12 plus grands des 181 TGI, ie in order of size: Paris, Bobigny, Lyon, Nanterre, Versailles, Lille, Marseille, Créteil, Bordeaux, Évry, Pontoise and Toulouse); Prosecutor of the Republic (Note: In the 47 largest of the 181 TGI, ie in order of size: Paris, Bobigny, Lyon, Nanterre, Versailles, Lille, Marseille, Créteil, Bordeaux, Évry, Pontoise, Toulouse, Strasbourg, Nantes, Aix-en-Provence, Montpellier, Nice, Rouen, Grenoble, Toulon, Grasse, Rennes, Nancy, Béthune, Metz, Meaux, Perpignan, Nîmes, Tours, Mulhouse, Caen, Dijon, Le Mans, Melun, Angers, Clermont-Ferrand, Draguignan, Valence, Saint-Denis-de-la-Réunion, Boulogne-sur-Mer, Orléans, Évreux, Saint-Étienne, Valenciennes, Amiens, Le Havre and Avignon)	Attorney-General; Prosecutor-General	Attorney-general; First attorney-general; prosecutor general

Notes for the table

Its composition varies with the jurisdiction:

- in police tribunals, the ministère public is represented by a substitut in the tribunal de grande instance for fifth-class contraventions and a commissaire de police, police commissioner, of the place where the tribunal is located, an officer of the ministère public, for the first through fourth classes of offense, and, on an exceptional basis, by the mayor of the municipality;
- In correctional tribunals, a prosecutor of the republic assisted by an assistant prosecutor and the substitutes of the prosecutor according to the importance of the tribunal;
- In courts of appeal, there is a prosecutor-general as well as attorneys-general and the general substituts who make up what is known as the "parquet général";
- In cours d'assises, the representative of the ministère public, called "attorney general", is either a member of the general parquet, or a member of the parquet of the correctional tribunal;
- in the Court of Cassation: one finds a prosecutor-general, a first attorney-general as well as attorneys-general. (This parquet cannot exercise any action publique. It has a role similar to that of the rapporteur public before the Conseil d'État or Council of State);
- Special case: "When the infractions concern the public roadways, the functions of the ministère public of a police tribunal may be filled by the departmental director of equipment or the agent designated by him to supplement him". This article is still in effect but the departmental directorates have been replaced by the interdepartmental directors of roads (directions interdépartementales des routes).
- before military tribunals in time of war (tribunal territorial des forces armées et tribunal militaire aux armées), the ministère public role falls to a "government commissioner".

=== Ministère public's role ===
The role of the ministère public, which is to defend the interests of society, the public order and the application of the law, is exercised in three areas: an action publique before a penal jurisdiction, an intervention before a civil jurisdiction, and the attributions administratives.

==== Exercise of public action in penal matters ====
He represents the interests of society and to do so he exercises an action publique (in other words prosecution as the plaintiff, intervening in the trial as a principal party). He can act both in the instruction and the judgment phases.

The services of the police judiciaire (PJ), or judicial police, are at the disposal of the ministère public for seeking out infractions, which allows him to decide whether or not to set off the action publique.

== In the administrative order ==
=== Before administrative jurisdictions ===
In common law administrative jurisdictions (i.e. as opposed to specialised administrative jurisdictions), commissaires du gouvernement (government commissioners) existed, and were loosely related to the judiciary's ministère public, albeit their functions were closer to giving a general opinion on legal matters pertaining a case rather than actively defending the interests of society of the government, despite their name. Their transformation into rapporteurs publics in 2009 confirmed that they were not of the same nature as the ministère public. Furthermore, Rapporteurs public has been confirmed to be fully independent and impartial in their functions.

== Before the tribunal des conflits ==
Article 6 of the law of February 4, 1850 bearing on the organisation of the tribunal des conflits provides that the functions of the ministère public will be filled by two commissioners of the government chosen every year by the President of the Republic, one from among the maîtres des requêtes on the State Council (Conseil d'État), the other from the parquet of the Cour de cassation. Le tribunal ne peut statuer qu'après avoir entendu les conclusions du commissaire du gouvernement (art. 4 de la loi). Si le rapporteur appartient au Conseil d'État, alors le commissaire du gouvernement doit être un magistrat de la Cour de cassation, et réciproquement (art. 7 de la loi).

== Non-independence of the parquet and condemnation of France ==
The parquet is not considered an independent judicial authority in the meaning of article 5 of the Convention de Sauvegarde des Droits de l’Homme et des Libertés Fondamentales. The European court for the rights of man condemned France in November 2010 for having conferred on it jurisdictional functions.

In 2013 the law was again modified, eliminating the oral instructions transmitted par the Chancellerie to prosecutors.

At the same time the European Court of Human Rights confirmed in a new verdict on June 27, 2013, Vassis et al vs France, that the French parquet cannot be considered a judicial authority in the sense of article 5§3 of the Convention.

== See also ==
- Accusateur public
- Application des peines
- Opportunité des poursuites
- Procureur général
- Public Prosecutor (France)
