= Tribunal correctionnel =

French court of first instance for criminal matters

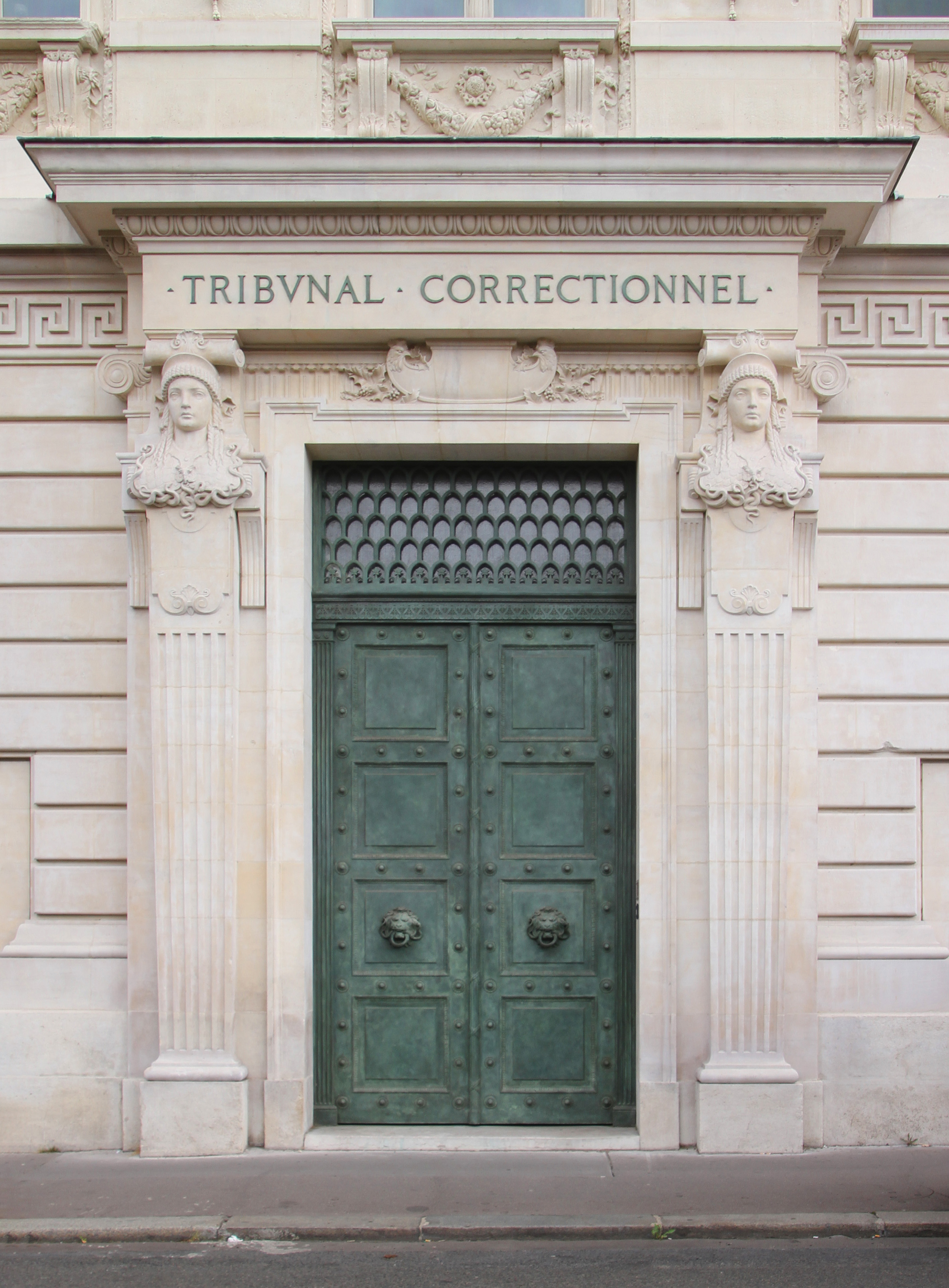
Tribunal correctionnel de Paris, at quai des Orfèvres

In France, the correctional court (French: tribunal correctionnel ) is the court of first instance that has jurisdiction in criminal matters regarding offenses classified as délits (middling-level crimes) (Note: Translation note: There is no agreement in English sources about how to refer to délit in English. The tripartite division of criminal offenses in French law does not line up well with concepts in common law, and translations of délit into English vary greatly. Some terms seen include: felony, major offense, intermediate offense, minor offense, minor crime, and misdemeanor. Many English sources describe the term on first appearance, and then just refer to it using the French term after that. Note that the English cognate delict exists (see Delict) but that word is never used in English to represent the French term.) committed by an adult. In 2013, French correctional courts rendered 576,859 judgments and pronounced 501,171 verdicts.

Lesser offenses called contraventions are judged by the Police Tribunal (proximity courts were permanently abolished on July 1, 2017). More serious wrongdoing such as felonies (crimes) are judged by the cour d'assises.

In terms of judicial organisation, the correctional court is one of the chambers (Note: chambre, an administrative division of the magistrates at that site, or seat of a court (tribunal).) of the tribunal de grande instance. At the largest of these courts, several chambers may hear criminal matters. Such courts number the chambers to distinguish them, and they are referred to as the nth correctional chamber or the nth chamber of the correctional court.

== Jurisdiction of the correctional court ==
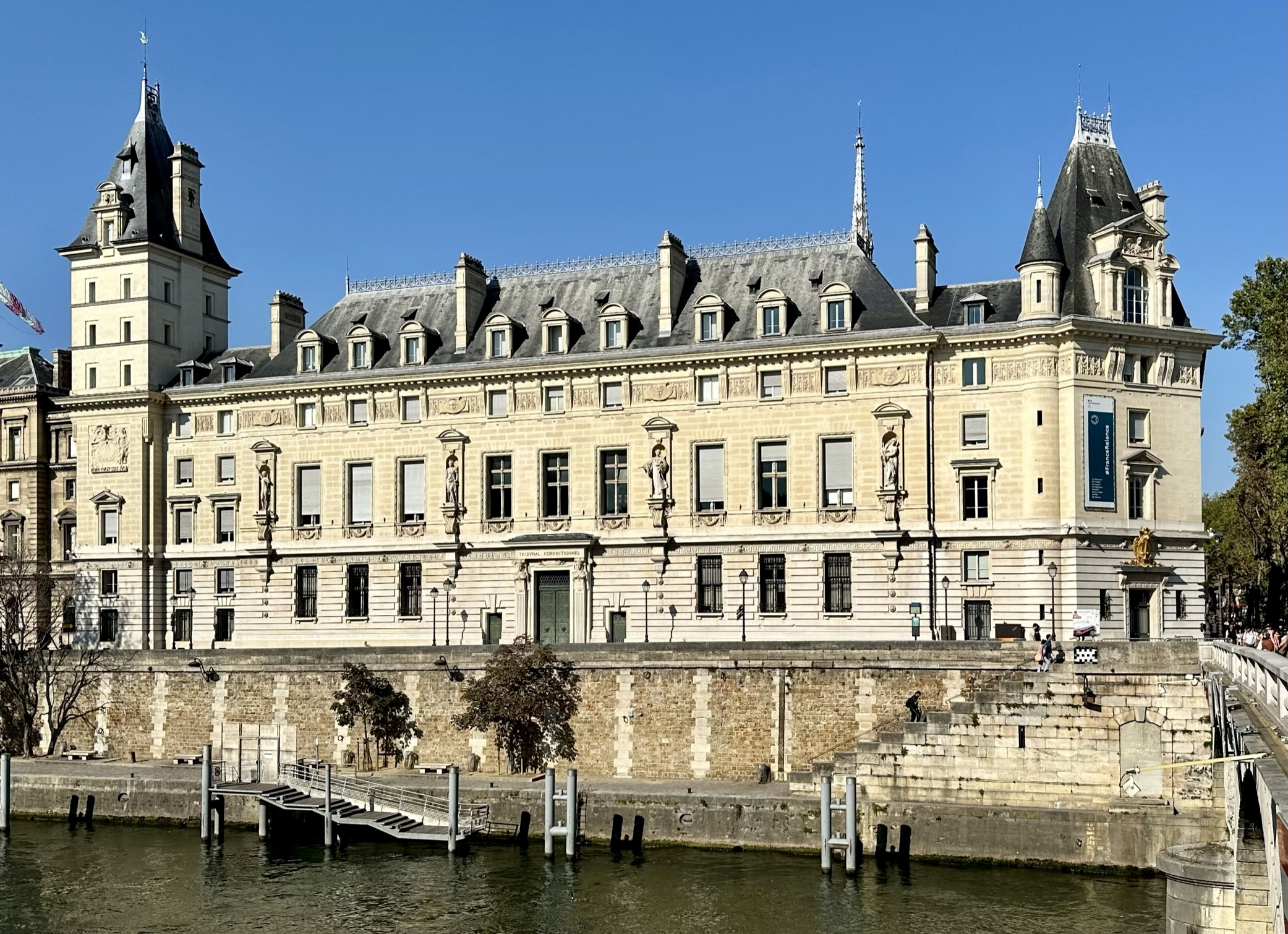
Correctional Court of Paris at 14, quai des Orfèvres, on the south façade of the Palais de Justice.

The jurisdiction of a court, such as the correctional court, is determined by the subject matter it handles (jurisdiction ratione materiae), the individuals it can judge (jurisdiction ratione personae), and the territorial area over which it exercises authority (jurisdiction ratione loci). The court must first assess its jurisdiction when a case is brought before it to determine if it can adjudicate, declaring its lack of jurisdiction (exception of incompetence) if it cannot.

=== Criteria for jurisdiction ===
==== Ratione materiæ ====
In France, the correctional court is the criminal jurisdiction of first instance, and has jurisdiction to judge misdemeanors (délits). In first instance, (Note: In criminal matters, a double degree of jurisdiction is the rule. In other words one may have a matter re-tried on appeal, after a first trial un premier procès.) it judges matters that concern the commission of a criminal offence (infraction pénale) considered a délit, similar in severity to a misdemeanor. In French law a misdemeanor is an offense punished by a prison sentence or by a fine of at least 3750 euros. The law also sets a maximum imprisonment term of ten years for misdemeanors punishable by imprisonment.

Since the classification of a misdemeanor is determined solely by the nature (imprisonment) or the minimum amount (€3,750 for fines) or maximum duration of the prescribed penalty (ten years for imprisonment), the correctional court’s jurisdiction covers criminal offenses across all areas: offenses against persons (involuntary homicide, aggravated assault, sexual assaults, discrimination, invasion of privacy, offenses against minors and families), offenses against property (theft, fraud, handling stolen goods, serious vandalism), offenses against state authority (corruption, contempt, rebellion, escape, forgery). These correctional offenses are defined and penalized by the Penal Code, as well as by special laws in other codes (e.g., weapons legislation, payment instruments, etc.) or non-codified laws (e.g., press law).

In some cases, multiple offenses may be committed simultaneously, or the commission of one may be linked to others, or they may occur sequentially without the offender being definitively convicted for one before committing the others. This is known as a combination of offenses. If all offenses in combination are misdemeanors, the correctional court adjudicates them together. In French law, a correctional court handling multiple misdemeanors in combination against the same person imposes a single penalty of the same type (e.g., imprisonment) for all offenses, not a separate penalty for each misdemeanor. However, as it can do when handling a single misdemeanor, the court may combine penalties of different types within certain limits (e.g., imprisonment and a fine).

If the offenses in combination are of different types, such as a misdemeanor and contraventions, the correctional court may handle all of them, particularly if there is a connection between them beyond the combination of offenses. The court must then rule on the related contraventions. Unlike the rule for combined misdemeanors, fines for contraventions accumulate with each other and with penalties imposed for combined misdemeanors. The court may then impose, for example, a prison sentence and multiple fines, corresponding to the number of related contraventions. The correctional court may also, when handling multiple cases with a connexité (connection), decide to consolidate them into a single case and impose a single type of penalty for all.

However, if one or more misdemeanors are connected to a crime, the criminal court has jurisdiction to adjudicate the related misdemeanors. The correctional court, however, cannot adjudicate the crime alongside the misdemeanors. If the crime and misdemeanor(s) in combination are not connected, separate proceedings (disjointed in legal terminology) are pursued: the assize court tries the crime, and the correctional court separately tries the misdemeanor(s).

==== Ratione personnæ ====
The correctional court has no jurisdiction over:

- offenses committed by minors (depending on their age and situation one of the juvenile courts would have jurisdiction, or the correctional courts for juveniles);
- a misdemeanor committed by the president of the Republic or a member of the government in the exercise of their functions (which would, respectivement, by tried by either the Haute Cour or the Cour de justice de la République, having jurisdiction in such a case).

Beyond these, the correctional court has jurisdiction to judge any other person who has reached the age of majority and has committed an offense. Its jurisdiction extends to co-authors and accomplices, assuming they too have also reached the age of majority. So for example two thieves who acted in concert, are co-authors of the theft, and any sponsor or silent partner is an accomplice by instigation. The three would judged together by the same correctional court assuming they were all adults. If one were a minor, his situation could only be determined by a juvenile court. Any proceedings that concern him would be severed from the correctional court case and take place only within the framework of the juvenile courts. So in some cases a matter might be examined by two different courts.

==== Ratione loci ====
Territorial jurisdiction is determined by:

- The location of the offense;
- The residence of the defendant;
- The place of arrest;
- The place of detention (even for another reason);
- The domicile or residence of the victim in cases of family abandonment.

At least one of these five locations must be within the territorial jurisdiction of the judicial court for the correctional court to have jurisdiction over the misdemeanor.

As of 2022, there are 164 correctional courts, each with territorial jurisdiction corresponding to that of the judicial court or court of first instance.

=== Jurisdictional exception ===
If the correctional court finds that at least one of the jurisdictional criteria is absent, it must declare its lack of jurisdiction: this means that it must refuse to judge the matter. The jurisdictional exception is an absolute of the public order, which means that even if all parties had agreed to "choose" the tribunal correctionnel despite the rules of jurisdiction, the court has an obligation to declare itself as not having jurisdiction.

If during a trial the correctional court finds that the facts it is judging as a misdemeanor in fact amount to a crime, it must declare that it does not have jurisdiction and refer the matter to an investigating judge, whose involvement is mandatory for crimes.

Exceptions do exist to the exception of jurisdiction rule: a correctional court which would normally be without jurisdiction may in some cases need to judge a matter that arise in another jurisdiction. When a matter is judged outside of its territorial jurisdiction it is called dépaysement. (Note: Dépaysement – Somewhat akin to extra-territorial change of venue in U.S. law.)

Finally, the law has come to recognize a practice of correctional courts, by fixing conditions where an act that can be characterized as a crime, rape for example can be judged by the correctional court as a lesser offense, such as sexual aggression rather than rape: this is called correctionnalization.

==== Dépaysement ====
In certain cases, particularly for the proper administration of justice or public safety, a criminal case must be tried in a different territorial jurisdiction than the one determined by standard ratione loci rules, a process known as dépaysement. If a trial risks serious public order disturbance, the criminal chamber of the Court of Cassation may order the case transferred to another correctional court, upon request by the Prosecutor General at the Court of Cassation. Similarly, for the interest of proper administration of justice, the Court of Cassation may transfer a case at the request of the Prosecutor General at the Court of Cassation or the court of appeal, acting independently or at the parties’ request.

To avoid bias, when a case involves a judge, lawyer, public officer, member of the national gendarmerie, police, customs, prison administration official, or any person with public authority who regularly interacts with the competent correctional court’s judges or officials, the Prosecutor General of the court of appeal may transfer the case to the nearest judicial court within the appeal jurisdiction, on their own initiative, at the public prosecutor’s suggestion, or at the request of the person concerned, overriding standard territorial jurisdiction. This ensures impartiality in cases where professional relationships could influence proceedings.

Transfers also occur due to material impossibility, such as when the competent court cannot be legally constituted or justice is interrupted, with requests made by the Prosecutor General at the Court of Cassation or the public prosecutor at the seized court. In smaller jurisdictions, if legal incompatibilities prevent court formation, the president of the court of appeal may order the case transferred to a neighboring court within the same appeal jurisdiction, as specified in an annual ordinance designating transfer courts.

==== Correctionnalisation ====
A lack of means in the cours d'assises in France allows some defendants to be judged by the correctional court after committing a crime. This is termed correctionnalisation. While illegal, the arrangement often suits both parties; the prosecutor or examining magistrate increases the likelihood of a shorter and simpler trial, as the criminal record lists only a misdemeanor, not a crime.

== Composition ==
A French correctional court is composed of:

- Three professional judges: a president and two assessors;.
- The public prosecutor’s office or parquet, represented by the public prosecutor or his representative. Similar to a prosecutor in common law jurisdictions in that he speaks for the community, although the role differs in other ways from jurisdictions where the juge d'instruction does not exist
- the clerk of the tribunal de grande instance

For the court to rule with a single judge, the potential penalty must be less than five years and involve specific misdemeanors outlined in the Code of Criminal Procedure, such as traffic offenses (e.g., driving under the influence) or assaults causing less than eight days of total incapacity for work (ITT) with only one aggravating circumstance. Paragraphs 2 and 3 of the Article 398-1 outline some exceptions having to do with provisional detention and procedure for immediate appearance.

If the wrong judge is assigned, the case is referred to the collegial panel, as jurisdiction rules are matters of public policy. Typically, the president of the collegial panel will serve as the single judge. In cases where debates are expected to be lengthy, additional judges may attend to ensure continuity, as the rule requires that only judges who have heard the debates can deliberate (e.g., to address issues like a judge falling ill). However, only three judges deliberate on the case.

== Procedure before the correctional court ==
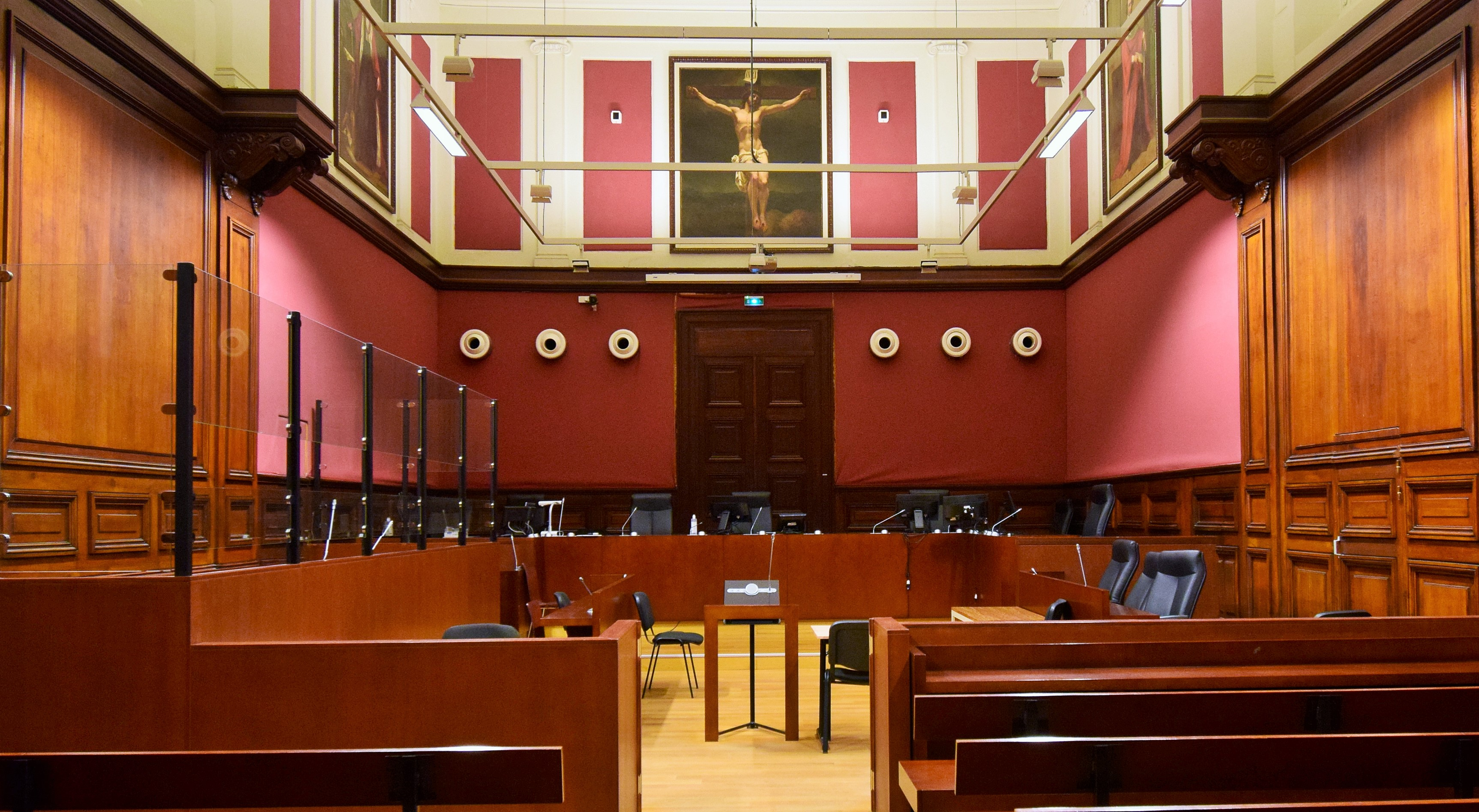
Courtroom at the Correctional Tribunal in the Palais Thiac in Bordeaux

Proceedings are generally public. If publicity poses a risk to public order, the serenity of the debates, the dignity of a person, or the interests of a third party, the civil party or the public prosecutor may request that the case be heard in camera (closed session). This decision is announced publicly.

The president may prohibit access to the courtroom for minors or specific minors. They may also expel anyone disrupting the proceedings, including the defendant.

The procedure before the correctional court follows this order:

- The president verifies the defendant’s identity and presents the document initiating the court’s involvement;
- If motions for nullity or incompetence are filed in limine litis (before addressing the facts), the court must theoretically join the procedural issue to the merits and deliberate on both simultaneously, unless the argument raised before any substantive defense could affect the procedure’s outcome. A judgment will be issued;
- Examination of the defendant regarding their background and the facts;
- Pleading by the civil party’s lawyer;
- Requisitions by the public prosecutor’s office;
- Pleading by the defendant’s lawyer (if the defendant has chosen to have one);
- The defendant is given the final word.

Following the civil party’s lawyer’s pleading (typically representing the victim), the public prosecutor (or their deputy) delivers an oral requisition, summarizing the evidence proving the defendant’s guilt and requesting a penalty on behalf of society. Contrary to common belief, the court is not obligated to follow the prosecutor’s requisitions, which are merely requests, similar to those made by the parties’ lawyers.

The judgment is delivered either “on the bench” (immediately) or “reserved” for a later specified date (which may be the same day at the end of the hearing or after a break). The public prosecutor and the clerk do not participate in the deliberation but must be present when the judgment is delivered. The offender, as well as the public prosecutor, may appeal the judgment. The civil party may also appeal, but only regarding their civil interests.

If the offender (i.e., the defendant) is absent from the hearing despite being duly summoned, the judgment is rendered in a contradictory manner but in their absence. Upon being notified of the judgment, they may appeal to be tried by the court of appeal.

== See also ==
- Tribunal supérieur d'appel—appeal court jurisdiction for some French overseas territories
- International Criminal Court
- International Court of Justice
- Judiciary of France
- Law codes in civil law and common law jurisdictions
- Civil law
- Common law
- Court of Appeal (France)—Court of Appeal in France. Differs considerably from appeals process in common law countries, in particular, certain types of court cases are appealed to courts called something other than "court of appeal"
- Court of Appeal, Court of Appeals, Cour d'appel—redirect to Appellate court, the courts of second instance and appeals process in common law countries, which differs considerably from French appeal process
- Court of Cassation - general discussion, does not mention France, but lists other examples of this type of court
- Court of Cassation (France) - highest judicial court of appeal in France, differs considerably from common law jurisdictions
- French criminal law, a sector of French law, and of the branches of the juridical system of the French Republic
  - Crime - in common law jurisdictions, a criminal offense, an illegal act. In French law, has a much more limited meaning, closer to felony - a serious offense punishable by a penalty of more than 10 years imprisonment. A délit, which roughly corresponds to a misdemeanor, is a breach of French criminal law (droit pénal) but not a crime under French law.
  - Criminal responsibility in French law
  - Delit - in French law, can be either a misdemeanor (delit penal) or delit civil
- Ministère public - shares some but not all characteristics of the prosecutor in common law jurisdictions. In France the procureur is considered a magistrate, for one thing, and investigation is typically carried out by a juge d'instruction.

=== Filmography ===
- Raymond Depardon, 10e chambre, instants d'audience (documentary film)
- Jean-Luc Léon, Pacifique Justice (televised documentary on the Tribunal de première instance in Papeete)

== Works cited ==
- République française; Secrétariat général du gouvernement (19 October 2022). "Légifrance Le service public de la diffusion du droit" [The public service for dissemination of the law]. Légifrance. Direction de l'information légale et administrative. ISSN 2270-8987. OCLC 867599055.
