= Comminatory =

Clause inserted into law

In law, a comminatory is a clause inserted into a law, edict, patent, or similar instrument that describes a punishment to be imposed on delinquents but that, in practice, is not carried out with the severity described or is not carried out at all.

In some countries, when an exile is enjoined not to return on pain of death, the sanction is treated as a comminatory penalty because, if the exile does return, the threatened punishment is not strictly executed; instead, the same threat is renewed, which is more than comminatory.

== See also ==
- Colloquy (law)
