= Social security tribunal =

Type of French civil court

In France, the Social security tribunal (in French: tribunal des affaires de la sécurité sociale) rules on disputes between social security funds (caisses de sécurité sociale) and users, for example regarding membership of a fund or the award and payment of benefits.

A social security tribunal is made up of a president, who is a judge of the regional court, and assessors, who are not professional judges, appointed for three years by the first president of the Court of Appeal from a list drawn up for the area within the jurisdiction of the particular tribunal by the regional director for young people, sport and social cohesion, following nominations by the most representative trade and professional organisations. The president of the social security tribunal also gives his opinion.

There are 115 social security tribunals.

== See also ==
- Justice in France
- Tribunals in the United Kingdom
