= Crime in France =

- Homicide: 1.3 (2024)
- Assault: 628.3 (2023)
- Burglary: 458.1 (2024)
- Theft: 1972.4 (2024)
- Fraud: 520.7 (2024)
- Corruption: 4.3 (2024)
- Bribery: 0.6 (2024)
- Money laundering: 5.8 (2024)
- Rape: 62.7 (2023)
- Sexual violence: 134.9 (2023)
- reported per 100,000 inhabitants

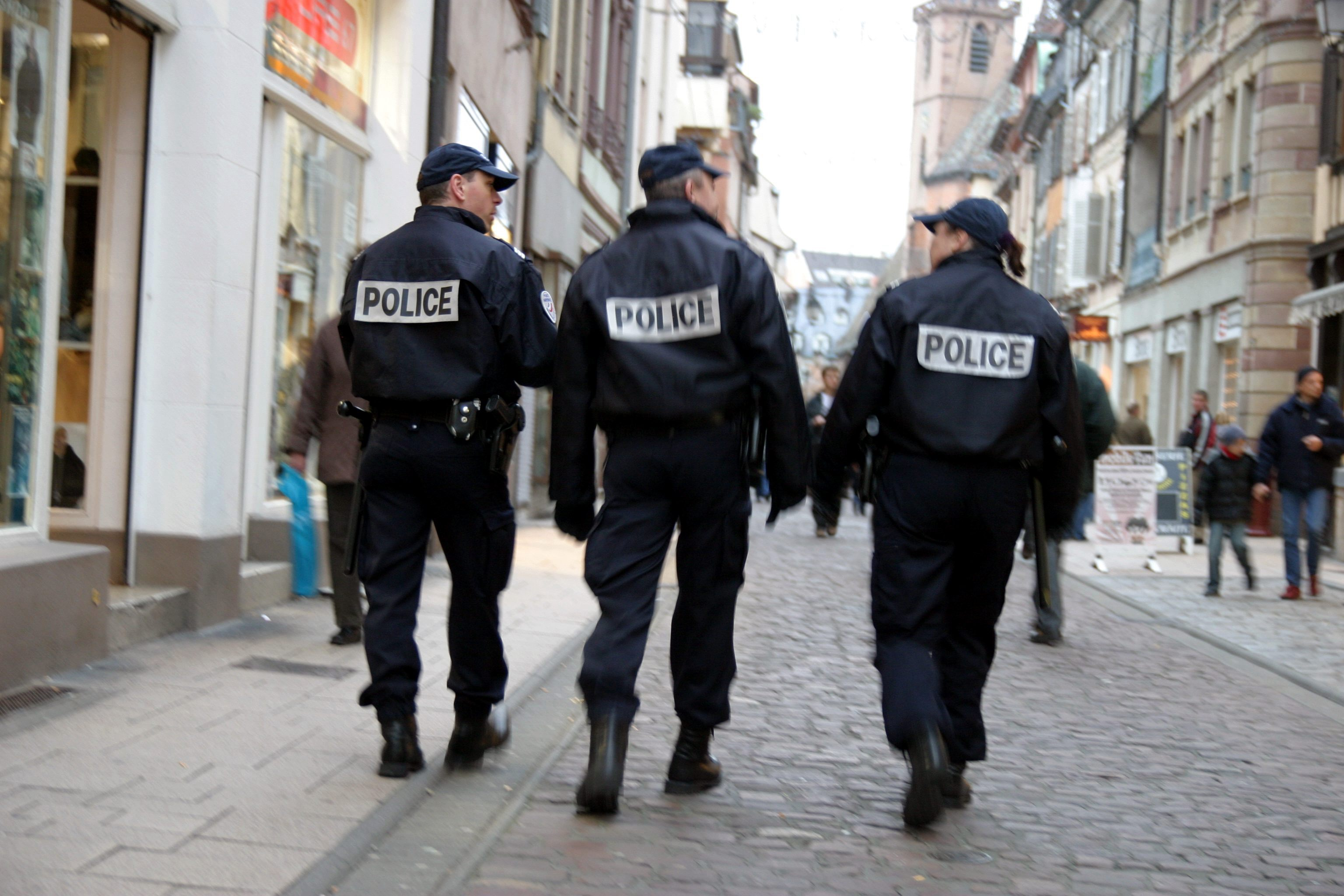
French National Police on a foot patrol

Crime in France is combated by a range of French law enforcement agencies.

== Crime by type ==
=== Murder ===
Though France's homicide rate fluctuated substantially in recent years, it tended to increase between 2020 - 2023 period beginning at 1.21 cases per 100,000 inhabitants in 2020 , 1.3 cases per 100,000 in 2021 and 1.4 cases per 100,000 in 2022 and 1.5 cases per 100,000 in 2023.

Drug Trafficking has been a growing concern in France for the past few years, due to the fact that a significant portion of murders in France is tied to the drug trade.

In 2024, 367 murders and attempted murders related to drug trafficking (compared to 418 in 2023) were recorded with a high proportion of young people involved in these crimes.

This decline is linked to the end of the war between two rival criminal groups in Marseille (DZ Mafia and Yoda), which were responsible for a significant proportion of drug homicides in 2023. This was a particularly bad year for Marseille as 49 people were shot dead and 118 were wounded, giving Marseille a murder rate of 5.5 per 100,000 inhabitants. About 80% of the murders were related to the rivalry between the two gangs.

In 2024, of the 176 people imprisoned for murder and attempted murder, "a quarter" were "under 20 years old," and 16 were minors. This phenomenon "particularly affects the southern half of France”.

Terror attacks have occurred in France, especially from the mid-1970s onwards. These include the 1995 France bombings, January 2015 Ile-de-France attacks, the November 2015 Paris attacks, the 2016 Magnanville stabbing, the 2016 Nice truck attack, the 2016 Normandy church attack, and the 2018 Paris knife attack. These attacks have been one of the reasons for the homicide rate fluctuation after 2014.

In September 2018, a police chief was stabbed to death in the city of Rodez. "The attacker was known to police. He had defaced the city hall door on 11 April," said Christian Teyssèdre, the Mayor of Rodez.

On 31 August 2019, a 19-year-old man was stabbed to death and eight others wounded, in Villeurbanne, Lyon. Two men, armed with a knife and a skewer, carried out the attack.

On 29 October 2020, Mayor Christian Estrosi said that 3 people were killed and several more were wounded in a suspected terror attack inside the Notre Dame Basilica church in the French city of Nice. Officials claim that this was a terror attack.

=== Rape ===
In 1971, the rape rate stood at 2.0 per 100,000 people. While in 1995, it was 12.5. In 2009, it stood at 16.2. According to a 2012 report, about 75,000 rapes take place each year.

According to a 2014 article, about 5,000 to 7,000 of the rapes are gang rapes.

=== Organized crime ===
Le Milieu is a category of organized crime in France. Criminal groups associated with the Milieu work in every major city in France, but are mostly concentrated in Marseille, Grenoble, Paris, and Lyon.

=== Corruption ===
In 2011, Transparency International concluded in its annual report for 2011 that France does not do enough to stop corruption. A TNS Sofres poll in October 2011 indicated that 72% of the French public had the perception that politicians are corrupt.

== By location ==
=== Priority Security Zones ===
In August 2012, the French Government announced the creation of fifteen "Priority Security Zones"' in an effort to target crime hotspots. Extra police, riot police, detectives and members of the intelligence services are to be mobilised. Social services, educational bodies and charities also put extra resources into the selected areas.

The Neuhof area of Strasbourg was selected because of a need to tackle violent crime, and the historic rural town of Chambly to the north of Paris is being focused on because of rising burglary rates and car theft. The northern quarter of Amiens in the Somme region and areas of Seine-Saint-Denis to the north of Paris, which witnessed fierce rioting in 2005, are priority zones because of widespread drug dealing and a rampant black market.

=== Paris ===
Violent crime is relatively uncommon in the city centre. Pickpockets are the most significant problem and are commonly children under the age of 16 because they are difficult to prosecute. Pickpockets are very active on the rail link from Charles de Gaulle Airport to the city centre.

The Paris Police Prefecture publishes a pamphlet entitled "Paris in Complete Safety" that provides practical advice and useful telephone numbers for visitors. In an emergency, dialling 17 will connect the caller to the police. You can also dial the Europe-wide emergency response number 112 to reach an operator for any kind of emergency service (similar to the U.S. and Canadian 911 system). Non-French speakers may experience a delay while an English speaker is located.

== See also ==
- List of major crimes in France (1900–present)
- The Francis Imbard affair
- Empain affair
- Contravention in French criminal law
