= Contravention =

Lesser offense in civil law

In civil law, a contravention is a lesser offense, similar to an infraction or civil penalty in common law countries.

== France ==
In French criminal law, a contravention is the least serious among three categories of offenses. It includes non-criminal offenses, such as parking tickets, trespassing, minor violence, or destruction of property. The penalty is a fine stipulated by regulation, sometimes augmented with a supplementary penalty such as a remedial driving workshop.

== Brazil ==
In Brazil, contravention is a sort of penal infraction — not only an administrative offense - which is considered to be less serious than a crime.

Since 1941, Brazilian criminal law has a dual system which separates penal infractions in two main different acts. They are the Brazilian Penal Code (Código Penal), describing crimes in general, and the Penal Contraventions Act, describing the contraventions.

Contraventions are punished less severely than crimes in Brazilian law. While crimes may be punished to reclusão (reclusion) or detenção (detention), the only kind of possible imprisonment for contraventions is prisão simples (simple prison), which is never served under closed conditions (only open and semi-closed conditions may be applied). Fines may also be imposed due to contravention sentencing.

In Brazilian law, one who is already convicted for a crime is not considered to be recidivist when committing a contravention for the first time, and vice versa.

== See also ==
- Comminatory – Clause inserted into law
- Infraction – Crime tried without a jury
- Regulatory offence – Crime for which mens rea is not required to prove culpability
- Police tribunal (France) – French court
- Misdemeanors in France
- Délit civil

== Works cited ==
- Jean, Jean-Paul (2010). Le système pénal [The penal system]. Repères (in French). La Decouverte. ISBN 978-2-7071-5414-9. OCLC 758870056.
- French Ministry of Justice (16 December 2016). "La justice pénale en France" [Criminal justice in France]. Ministère de la Justice (in French).
