= Procureur général =

French prosecutor

In France, a procureur général is a prosecutor at a court of appeal (cour d'appel), at the Court of Cassation (Cour de cassation) or the Court of Audit (Cour des comptes). In the case of the appellate courts, the term refers to the magistrate who conducts the prosecution for the court of appeal, as opposed to the judges (the members of the "formations de jugement").

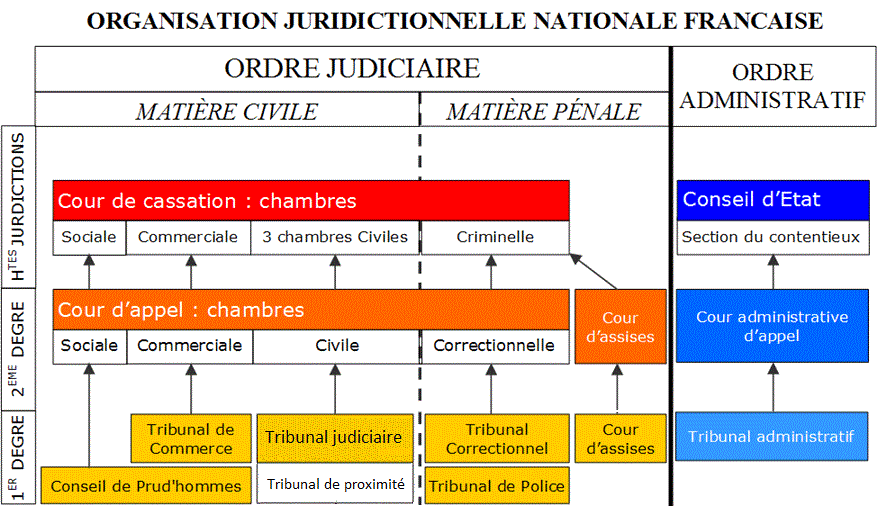
Courts of Appeal in the French judiciary.

The procureurs généraux at the courts of appeal are the superiors of the prosecutors of the Republic, whose actions they coordinate. These two groups form a public prosecutor's office (distinct from that of the Court of Cassation), subject to the instructions of the Directorate of Criminal Affairs and the Minister of Justice. A procureur général is assisted by one or more avocat général and substituts généraux.
