= Agricultural Land Tribunal =

Type of civil court in France

In France, the Agricultural Land Tribunal (in French: tribunal paritaire des baux ruraux) hears disputes between landlords and tenants of agricultural land regarding various forms of lease or contract for tenancy and the working of land.

The tribunal is presided over by a judge of the district court. The president sits with four non‑professional assessors: two of them are landlords and two are tenants, and all four are elected by their peers for six years from lists of candidates drawn up by the prefect following nominations by a committee for the preparation of electoral lists.

== See also ==
- Justice in France
