= Labour Court (France) =

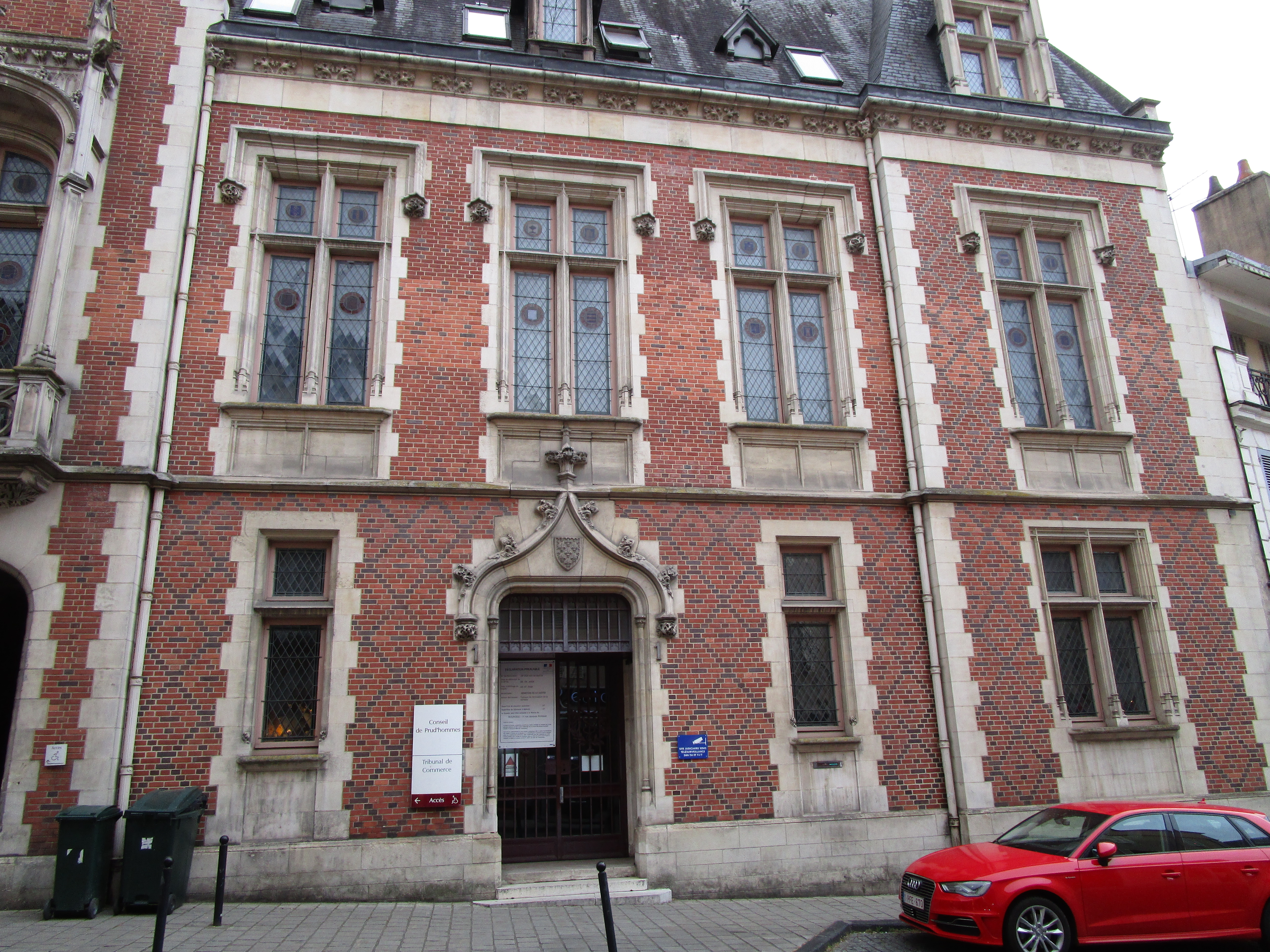
Labour Court of Bourges

In France, the Labour Courts or employment tribunals (French: conseil de prud'hommes) resolve individual disputes arising out of an employment contract. The dispute is resolved by a judgment only if conciliation cannot be achieved by the court. Judges are not professionals; currently appointed, they were traditionally elected by their peers, with an even number of judges. Half the members represent employers, and half represent employees. Labour courts were created at the beginning of the 19th century.

An employment tribunal is divided into five specialised divisions, for management, manufacturing, distributive trades and commercial services, agriculture, and miscellaneous activities. If the four members hearing a case are tied, the tribunal will be chaired by a judge of the district court.

There are one or more employment tribunals in each département, and at least one in the area of jurisdiction of each regional court. There are 210 employment tribunals.

The Labour Courts were established by Napoleon in 1806.

== See also ==
- Justice in France
