= Police tribunal (France) =

A police court in France is a criminal court which judges all classes of minor offenses (contraventions) committed by adults. More serious offenses are judged by a correctional court (tribunal correctionnel ) for délits (middling-level crime (Note: Translation note: There is no agreement in English sources about how to refer to délit in English. The tripartite division of criminal offenses in French law does not line up well with concepts in common law, and translations of délit into English vary greatly. Some terms seen include: felony, major offense, intermediate offense, minor offense, minor crime, and misdemeanor. Many English sources describe the term on first appearance, and then just refer to it using the French term after that. Note that the English cognate delict exists (see Delict) but that word is never used in English to represent the French term.)), or by a cour d'assises for a serious crime.

== Composition ==
The police court sits at the tribunal d'instance and is composed of a juge d'instance and a court clerk (greffier). The ministère public is represented by the procureur de la République or one of his representatives, known as substituts (substitutes) if the offense is a fifth-degree petty infraction (contravention).

== Jurisdiction ==
=== Jurisdiction of subject (ratione materiæ) ===
The police tribunal handles contraventions, except offenses punishable by a penalty of imprisonment or of fines greater than 3,000 euros, voire 4,000(? -t) euros of the Code of criminal procedure. The version approved November 18, 2016 provides for a few exceptions, such as an edict of the Conseil d'État. The police tribunal is also competent d'attribution, meaning it also has jurisdiction in matters of customs, as provided by Article 356 of the Code des douanes, Code of Customs, which specifies that "The police courts hear customs offenses and all customs-related matters raised by way of exception." (Note: "tribunaux de police connaissent des contraventions douanières et de toutes les questions douanières soulevées par voie d'exception.")

=== Jurisdiction of place (ratione loci) ===
The police tribunal may handle infractions from any of the following relevant scopes of authority:

- place of the infraction's commission or discovery
- of the defendant's residence
- site of an impounded subject vehicle

The other compétence rules are identical to those of the tribunal correctionnel, (correctional tribunal).

== See also ==
- Contravention in French criminal law
