= Cour d'assises =

Type of criminal court in France

In France, a cour d'assises, or Court of Assizes or Assize Court, is a criminal trial court with original and appellate limited jurisdiction to hear cases involving defendants accused of felonies, meaning crimes as defined in French law. It is the only French court that uses a jury trial.

== Justiciable matters ==
Under French criminal law, the definition of a crime is limited to any criminal act punishable by over ten years of prison, including murder and rape. (Note: English terms: crime and criminal offense/offence are "infraction" in French legal terminology.)

== Previous death penalty application ==
The cour d'assises, uniquely outside military law, could sentence proven convicts for serious crimes, e.g. murder (assassinat or meurtre) to the death penalty, until it was abolished from French law in September 1981. In the sentencing phase, a qualified majority would vote on the verdict, or 2/3 of the jury, the same procedure as in rendering the guilty verdict. One of the last famous death penalty trials, that of Patrick Henry in 1977, famously ended in a life sentence after the jury voted 7–5 in favour of a death sentence.

== Composition ==
Cases are tried by a jury of six jurors and a panel of three active judges, that is, one judge-in-charge (called "president" of the court) and two associate judges (assesseurs), on first hearing, and a jury of nine jurors and a panel of three active judges on appeal. Lists of eligible jurors are put together at random from the list of registered voters, but both the prosecution and defense have the right to peremptory challenge and can refuse a juror without stating a reason.

Special procedures exist for the following categories of crimes and suspects:

- Felonies committed by teenagers 16 years or older are tried in a special Juvenile Assize Court (Cour d'Assises des Mineurs)
- Felonies such as terrorism or major illicit drug trafficking, which are tried in a special assize court sitting 7 active judges on first hearing and 9 on appeal, without jurors. In such cases a simple majority is needed to convict, instead of two thirds majority in jury trial. The 2019-2022 trial against Salah Abdeslam was one notable such case.
- More recently, since certain judicial reforms undertaken in 2018-2022, seven departments have "experimented" with cours criminelles hearing matters including of such gravity formerly requiring a trial in the cour d'assise, with seven magistrates.

== Procedure ==
The procedure before the Cour d'assises is oral: defendants and witnesses give their testimony before the court. Defendants and their close relatives cannot be put under oath, since doing so could force them into self-incrimination or incrimination of a relative.

As in all French criminal trials, the victim is a party with his or her own attorney, besides the public prosecution. If the accused is convicted the court will, without the jury, rule on civil damages.

At the end of the trial, the judges and jurors retire. They first decide the question of guilt by answering a series of questions—e.g., "Did X murder Y?", "Did X premeditate the murder?" If a conviction results, they then rule on the appropriate penalty. During this procedure, judges and jurors have equal positions on questions of facts, while judges decide questions of procedure. Judges and jurors have also equal positions on sentencing. Voting is secret and blank or invalid votes are counted in favor of the defendant.

== Appellate Assize Court ==
Every département in France has its own cour d'assises. In the past, their verdicts could not be appealed to the Court of Appeal; prior to 2001, they could only be appealed to the Court of Cassation, which would review the case on points of procedure and law alone. When reversed, which was uncommon except for the death penalty, the Court would refer the de novo trial to another Assize court.

One argument in favor of this practice was that allowing appeals to be made to professional judges after a verdict had been rendered by a popular jury would in essence deny popular sovereignty. Since 2001, however, Assize court verdicts may be appealed on points of fact (including sentence) to another department's Assize court (chosen by the Court of Cassation) and heard before a larger jury. The case is then fully retried.

Appeals to the Court of Cassation are still possible on points of law and procedure after the first appeal (except in case of acquittal). If this appeal on law is denied, the verdict is final; otherwise, the Court of Cassation will quash (casse) the verdict and remand the case to the appeal court for a retrial of points of fact and law.

== See also ==
- Conférence du barreau de Paris
- Constitutional Council (France)
- in modern law cour d'assises exists only in the French judiciary and other civil law jurisdictions, i.e.
  - Corte d'Assise Italian Cour d'assises
  - Belgian Cour d'assises
- it may also refer to obsolete courts in a number of common law jurisdictions, for example:
  - Assizes
  - Assizes (Ireland)
- or royal writs, for example:
  - Assize of Clarendon
  - Assize of Northampton
- Judiciary of France
- Cour de cassation, highest judicial court in France
- Court of Cassation - general discussion mostly dealing with common law jurisdictions
- Court of Appeal (France)—Court of Appeal in France. Differs considerably from appeals process in common law countries, in particular, certain types of court cases are appealed to courts called something other than "court of appeal"
- Court of Appeal, Court of Appeals, Cour d'appel—redirect to Appellate court, the courts of second instance and appeals process in common law countries, which differs considerably from French appeal process
- Ministère public - shares some but not all characteristics of the prosecutor in common law jurisdictions. In France the Prosecutor#France is considered a magistrate, for one thing, and investigation is typically carried out by a juge d'instruction.
- Police Tribunal (France)
- Tribunal correctionnel (France)
- Criminal responsibility in French law
- Crime - in common law jurisdictions, a criminal offense, an illegal act. In French law, has a much more limited meaning, closer to felony - a serious offense punishable by a penalty of more than 10 years imprisonment. A délit, which roughly corresponds to a misdemeanor, is a breach of French criminal law (droit pénal) but not a crime under French law.
- Delict - general discussion of this term in civil law jurisdictions.
- French criminal law, defines and codifies crime, delict, etc. and specifies penalties
