= HEM Business School =

Higher education institution in Morocco

- Type: Private for-profit business school
- Established: May 24, 1988; 38 years ago
- President: Abdelali Benamour
- Academic staff: 250 part-time lecturers
- Administrative staff: 180 full-time employees
- Students: 2000
- Location: Casablanca, Rabat, Marrakesh, Tangier, Fez, Oujda, Morocco
- Language: French, English
- Website: www.hem.ac.ma

The HEM Business School (Arabic: المعهد العالي للتدبير, abbreviated as HEM) is a Moroccan private higher education institution specializing in management. It was founded in 1988 by Professor Abdelali Benamour, who serves as the President of the Competition Council, and inaugurated on May 24, 1988. In 2013, the World Bank became a shareholder in HEM, marking its first direct investment in a private educational institution in Morocco to support the school's growth projects.

== Overview ==
=== History ===
HEM was established by Professor Abdelali Benamour and officially inaugurated on May 24, 1988.

=== Mission ===
HEM aims to:

- Educate business managers
- Add value in knowledge, skills, and attitudes within Moroccan businesses
- Educate students in civic values and citizenship
- Conduct scientific research
- Contribute to the overall development of the country

=== Campuses ===
HEM operates from five campuses:

- HEM Casablanca, established in 1988 in Casablanca
- HEM Rabat, established in 1993 in Rabat
- HEM Marrakech, established in 2004 in Marrakesh
- HEM Tangier, established in 2008 in Tangier
- HEM Fez, established in 2010 in Fez
- HEM Oujda, established in 2013 in Oujda

=== Affiliated Centers ===
- The Agora (conference and continuing education center)
- The Center for Social, Economic and Managerial Studies (CESEM), publisher of the quarterly journal Economia

== Partnerships ==
HEM has established cooperation agreements with several international institutions, including:

- France
  - Sciences Po Paris
  - Paris Dauphine University
  - IAE Lyon (Jean Moulin University Lyon III)
  - IAE Paris (University Paris 1 Panthéon-Sorbonne)
  - Pantheon-Assas University (University Paris 2 Panthéon-Assas)
  - Reims Management School
  - EDC Paris Business School
  - IESEG School of Management
  - KEDGE Business School
  - La Rochelle Business School
  - ISC Paris Business School
  - NEOMA Business School
- Italy
  - University of Siena
- Portugal
  - Nova School of Business and Economics
- Germany
  - EBS Germany
  - Munich Business School
- Belgium
  - Louvain School of Management (Catholic University of Louvain)
  - Solvay Brussels School
- Netherlands
  - Inholland University of Applied Sciences
  - Rotterdam Business School
  - Maastricht University
- England
  - Regent's University London
- United States
  - University of California, Los Angeles
  - Florida International University
- South Africa
  - University of Cape Town Graduate School of Business
  - Groupe ISM
- Malaysia
  - Universiti Sains Malaysia
- Korea
  - Chung-Ang University
  - Kongju National University
- Denmark
  - University College of Northern Denmark
- India
  - Indian Institute of Management Bangalore
