= Geneviève Gobillot =

French scholar of Islam

- Born: 1950 (age 75–76)

Academic work
- Discipline: Islamic studies
- Institutions: Jean Moulin University Lyon 3
- Main interests: Islamic mysticism

Geneviève Gobillot (French: [ʒənəvjɛv ɡobijo]) is a French scholar of Islam, Muslim civilization and professor at the Jean Moulin University Lyon 3 since 1993. She is a specialist in Islamic mysticism, Shi'ism and Sufism, particularly in Al-Hakim al-Tirmidhi, author of the 10th century. Her work also includes the intercultural and intertextual reading of the Qur'an in the context of a rapprochement between monotheisms.

== Publications ==
Books

- 1998: Les Chiites, Brépols
- 2000: La Conception originelle : Ses interprétations et fonctions chez les penseurs musulmans, Institut Français d'Archéologie Orientale
- 2005: L’Orient chrétien dans l’Empire musulman (Hommage à Gérard Troupeau), collective work under the direction of Marie-Thérèse Urvoy & Geneviève Gobillot, coll. "Studia Arabica" Vol. III, Éditions de Paris
- 2007: Pluralisme religieux : quelle âme pour l'Europe ? (with Heinz-Otto Luthe and Marie-Thérèse Urvoy), coll. "Studia Arabica", Éditions de Paris
- 2007: Exégèse et critique des textes sacrés : judaïsme, christianisme, islam hier et aujourd'hui (with Danielle Delmaire, Yohanan Lambert and Bernard Barc), Librairie orientaliste Paul Geuthner
- 2007: Le Coran (with Michel Cuypers), Paris, éd. du Cavalier bleu, coll. "Idées reçues"
- 2011: Islam et Coran : Idées reçues sur l'histoire, les textes et les pratiques d'un milliard et demi de musulmans (with Paul Balta and Michel Cuypers), éd. du Cavalier bleu
- 2014: Idées reçues sur le Coran : entre tradition islamique et lecture moderne (with Michel Cuypers), éd. du Cavalier bleu

Contributions, prefaces and articles

- 2002: Introduction and presentation of Les Calendriers et leurs implications culturelles, ELAH
- 2009: La Bible vue par le Coran, in Chrétiens face à l’islam. Premiers temps, premières controverses, Bayard, 2009, (p. 139–169)
- 2011: Édition et préface de Monde de l’Islam et Occident. Les voies de l’interculturalité, éd. E. M. E., coll. "Transversales philosophiques"
- La Bible relue par le Coran, 19 December 2007, article by Geneviève Gobillot in L'Express

Translations

- 1998: Al-Hakim al-Tirmidhi, Le Livre de la profondeur des choses, 306 p., Presses universitaires du Septentrion, coll. "Racines et modèles"
- 2006: Al-Hakim al-Tirmidhi, Le Livre des nuances, Ou de l'impossibilité de la synonymie, 570 p., Librairie orientaliste Paul Geuthner
