= Gilles Guyot =

Gilles Guyot (born 29 August 1946) is a management professor at the Jean Moulin University Lyon 3 in Lyon, France.

Guyot was born in Roanne, Loire. He is the current dean of the university business school, the IAE of Lyon. He was re-elected in this function in July 2007. Guyot had already been the dean of this business school from 1990 to 1997.

Guyot is also president of the network gathering all the French universities business schools (Institut d'Administration des Entreprises) and has been decorated as knight of the Légion d'honneur.

From 1983 to 1987 he occupied different executive positions within the Jean Moulin University Lyon 3 management. In 1997 he became the chancellor of the university (président de l'université de Lyon-III) for five years. In the private sector Guyot was a lawyer at HSD, part of Ernst & Young Lyon, from 1989 to 1993.

His research and teachings focus on innovation, cross-cultural management and strategy. Since 1983 he works for an internationalization of the university studies. Thus he led the enlargement of the international relationships of the university and the IAE with others universities throughout the world. The IAE students exchange programmes covert now more than 350 universities. Guyot is also one of the promoters of the overseas programmes taught by the IAE in other countries.

== See also ==
- IAE, the Lyon 3 business school
- Lyon 3 university
