= National Institute of Accounting =

National Institute of Accounting Sciences and Business Administration
- Institut National des Sciences Comptables et de l'Administration d'Entreprises
- Motto: "We continue Innovating"
- Type: Business school
- Established: 1981
- Director: Dr. Rakoto Harimino
- Location: Antananarivo, Analamanga; 18.9044°S 47.5064°E
- Language: French
- Website: www.inscae.mg

The National Institute of Accounting Sciences and Business Administration (INSCAE, Institut National des Sciences Comptables et de l'Administration d'Entreprises) is a public higher education institution located in Antananarivo, Madagascar.

== History ==
The Accounting Training Center (Centre de Formation en Comptabilité, CFC) was established in 1981 following an agreement between the Republic of Madagascar and the World Bank. It quickly expanded its scope to become the National Institute of Accounting Sciences and Business Administration (INSCAE) in 1986.

INSCAE operates under the dual supervision of the Ministry of Finance and Budget and the Ministry of Higher Education and Scientific Research of Madagascar.

== Programs ==
=== Undergraduate Programs (Bachelor's degree + 3 years) ===
The undergraduate programs, offered in both initial and continuing education formats, lead to two specializations:

Accounting and Finance, awarded with a Higher Diploma specialized in Accounting Sciences (Diplôme Supérieur spécialisé en Sciences Comptables, DSSC) Business Administration, awarded with a Higher Diploma specialized in Business Administration Sciences (Diplôme Supérieur spécialisé en Sciences de l'Administration d'Entreprises, DSSAE)

=== Master's Programs (Bachelor's degree + 5 years) ===
INSCAE offers master's degrees through a partnership with the IAE Poitiers:

Business Administration Option

  - Master in Marketing and Strategy
  - Master in International Commerce
  - Master in International Management
  - Master in Human Resource Management

Finance Option

  - Master in Finance and Banking Management
  - Master in Accounting, Control, and Auditing
  - Master in Management Control and Audit

These Master's programs can be pursued with a research option.

=== MBA Program ===
The part-time MBA program lasts for two years and awards a Master of Business Administration (MBA) degree.

== Business Development Division ==
INSCAE also offers professional training services for businesses, public organizations, and other entities.
