= Bernard Lavigne =

French judge (born 1959)

Bernard Lavigne (born 1959) is a French judge.

In 2005, he was one of the first team leader of the International Criminal Court and specifically tasked with the enforcement of international law in the Democratic Republic of the Congo. Lavigne pursued Congolese war criminals and combated the phenomenon of child soldiers. Lavigne concluded his three-year mission in June 2007 before being nominated at the Toulouse grande instance tribunal.
