= Institut supérieur de management =

School of the Versailles-Saint-Quentin-en-Yvelines University

- Type: Business School
- Established: 2010
- President: Philippe Hermel
- Location: Guyancourt
- Campus: Urban
- Nickname: ISM
- Website: www.ism.uvsq.fr

The Institut supérieur de management was the business school of the Versailles Saint-Quentin-en-Yvelines University. Created in 2010, the school was located in Guyancourt. In 2019, it joined the IAE's network and became the IAE Versailles.
