= IAE Versailles =

Institut d'administration des entreprises de Versailles (Institut Supérieur de Management)
- Type: Public University
- Established: 2019
- President: Gilles Rouet
- Students: 1300
- Location: Versailles, France
- Campus: Guyancourt
- Affiliations: Versailles Saint-Quentin-en-Yvelines University IAE's network
- Website: http://www.ism.uvsq.fr

The Institut d'administration des entreprises de Versailles (also known as IAE de Versailles, formerly Institut supérieur de management) is a public business school, part of Versailles Saint-Quentin-en-Yvelines University in France. It is also a component of the IAE's network, bringing together 35 national business schools around France. It offers 30 courses including Bachelor's degree, Habilitation, Master's degree and PhD.
