= IAE Lille =

Coordinates: 50°38′47″N 3°03′44″E

IAE Lille University School of Management
- Institut d'Administration des Entreprises de Lille
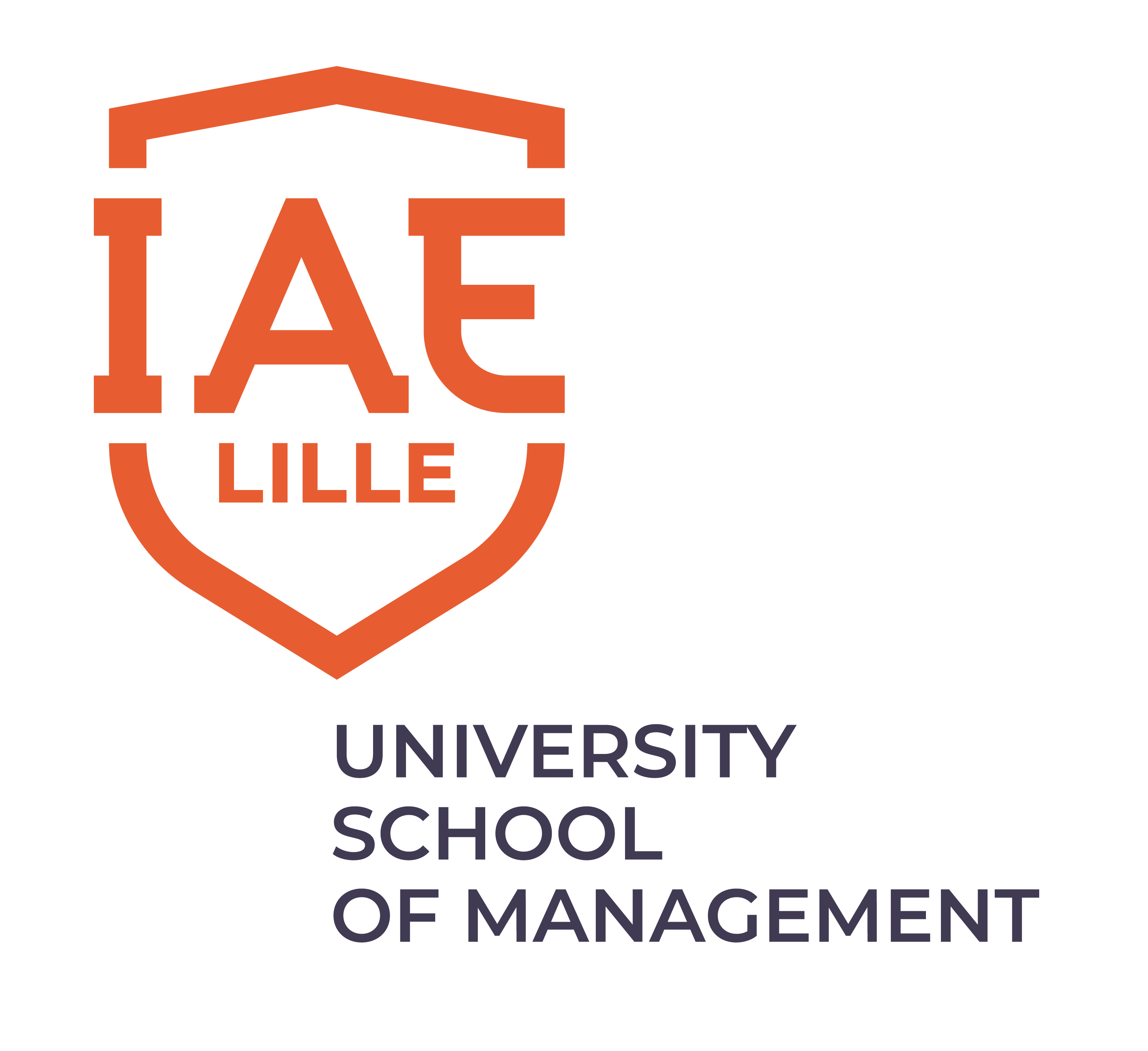
- Motto: Tout un monde de management
- Type: Public business school
- Established: 1956
- Affiliations: University of Lille
- Dean: Pascal Philippart
- Students: 2300
- Location: 104, avenue du peuple Belge 59043 Lille Cedex, Lille, Hauts-de-France, France
- Website: https://iaelille.fr/

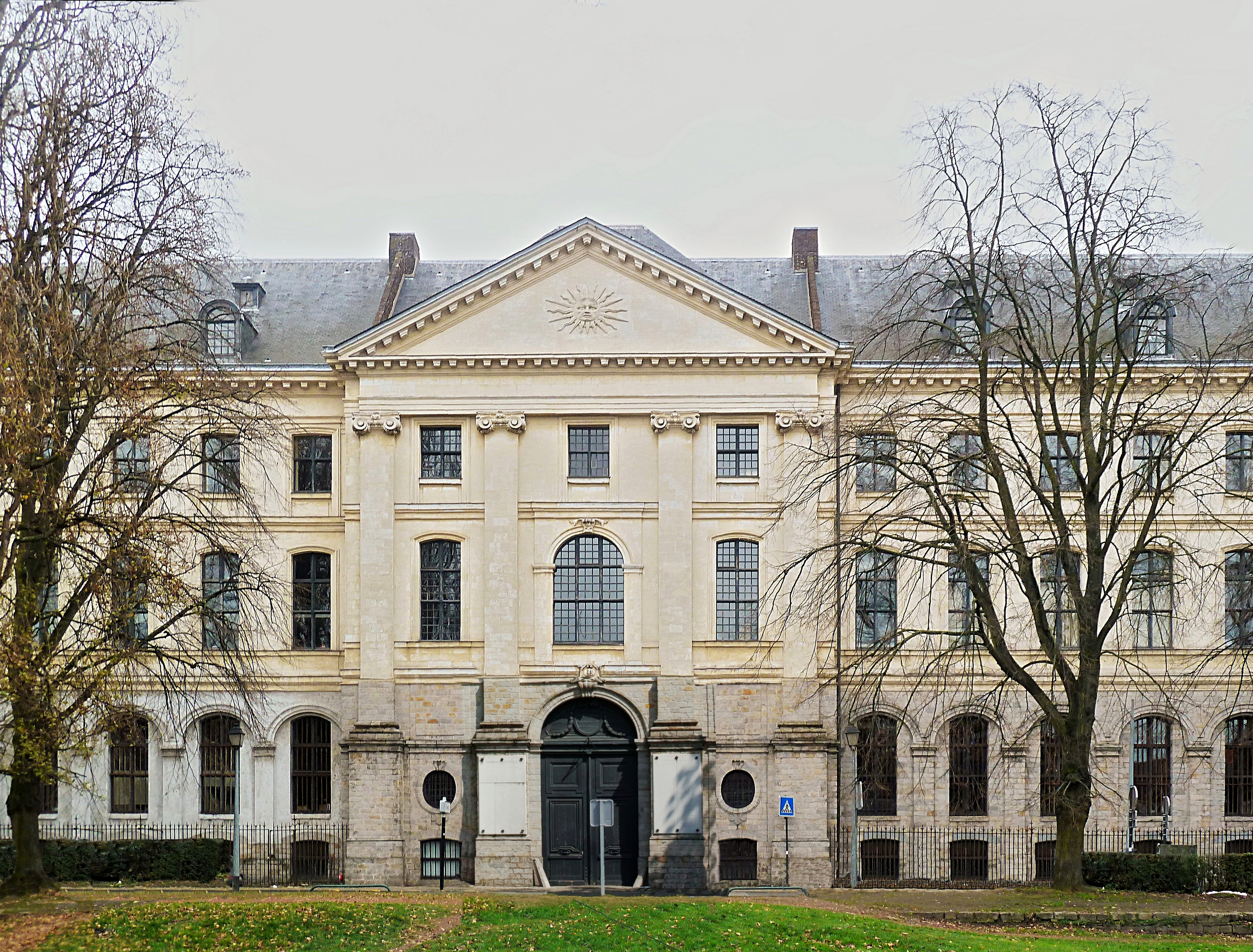
IAE Lille - main entrance

IAE Lille University School of Management, also known as Institut d'Administration des Entreprises de Lille, is the business school of the University of Lille. It is also a member of the IAE University Schools of Management network, bringing together 38 university business schools around France. Being one of the top French universities in management, school is highly internationalized and has an alumni network of 18,000 former students throughout the world.

The IAE Lille University School of Management is situated in old town of Lille.

IAE Lille participates in Erasmus Programme and also maintains exchange agreements with several universities across Europe, Asia and America.

== Admissions ==
Students are recruited after a bachelor's or master's degree from public universities and Grandes Écoles or equivalents. Candidates need to show very good academic records, pass an entrance examination, and show working knowledge of the French language.

== History ==
The Institut d'Administration des Entreprises de Lille was established in 1956 by Gaston Berger. The vocation of the school is to provide skills in Management and Business Administration to executives and students from various backgrounds (in engineering, law, humanities...) and to offer advanced expertise to high potential professionals.

== Undergraduate, Masters & Doctorate ==
- MSc Management MSc (Audit, Accounting and Finance, Internal Audit and Control, International Commerce, Financing and Development of Organizations, General Business Management, Human Resources)
- BSc in Economics and Management (in English)
- MSc in Business Administration
- MSc in Executive International Management (in English)
- MSc in International Commerce
- MSc in Marketing
- MSc in Project Management
- MSc in Marketing Research
- Doctorate in Management Science - Strategic Management
- Doctorate in Marketing

== Campus ==
In 1996 main campus was moved to a remodeled 18th century building in the Old town of Lille.

== Research ==
IAE de Lille participates in the management research studies. About a hundred of researches work for Center of national scientific research in 5 topics:

- Money, finance, banking
- Strategy and management of organizations
- Marketing and IT
- Economics and health management
- Productivity and efficiency measurement
