= IAE Lyon =

Coordinates: 45°44′55″N 4°51′36″E

IAE Lyon School of Management
- IAE Lyon, University of Lyon
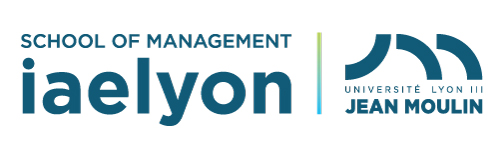
- Type: Public
- Established: 1956
- Dean: Marie-Christine CHALUS
- Academic staff: 165 professors + 700 executives
- Students: 7800
- Location: 6 Cours Albert Thomas 69008 Lyon France, Lyon, France
- Website: http://iae.univ-lyon3.fr

The IAE Lyon Institut d'Administration des Entreprises (Institute of Business Administration), is the school of Management of the Jean Moulin University Lyon3. Its main campus is located in the historical complex of the “Manufacture des Tabacs” in the heart of Lyon, France.

Founded in 1956 the IAE Lyon has 7,800 students in 2018 (including 3000 in postgraduate studies), accounting for 27% of the 29,000 students at Lyon 3 University.

In addition to the 165 full-time professors at the IAE, 700 executives from private, external companies contribute to the education.

In 2018, IAE Lyon offered seven bachelor's degrees (Licence), twelve professional bachelor's degrees (Licence professionnelles), thirteen master's degrees (with 58 specializations), one Executive MBA, Executive DBA (Doctorate in Business Administration) and PhD.

As of 2018, IAE Lyon maintained partnerships with 159 universities in 50 countries for student exchange, double-degree programs, and offshore instruction.

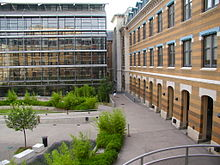
IAE Lyon, Manufacture des Tabacs

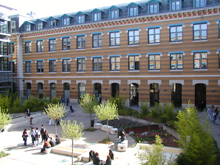
South courtyard of the 'Manufacture des Tabacs' complex with the library building

== History ==
Gaston Berger, then in charge of the tertiary education, created the Institut d'Administration des Entreprises in 1955. The following year the IAE of Lyon was created by governmental decision. At the start the IAE Lyon was a part of the Law and Economics faculty and was located on the Saône's Quays at 15 quai Claude Bernard. In 1957 the first class graduated.

After May 1968, the Edgar Faure’s law abolished the existing faculties and replaced them with what is now known as universities. One year later the government granted an exceptional status to the IAE Lyon making it an independent part of the newly created University Lyon 2. In 1970 the Maîtrise en Sciences de Gestion, a four-year degree in management is created.

1973 the IAE Lyon became a part of Jean Moulin University Lyon 3 created in the same year. In 1975 the first five-year degrees, called Diplôme d’Etudes Supérieures Spécialisées (DESS) and Diplôme d’Etudes Approfondies (DEA), are created. They were co-managed by the IAE Lyon, the Ecole Supérieure de Commerce de Lyon (future EM Lyon) and the Economics department of the university. These degrees are the predecessors of the current Master's degrees available. During this same year, the first research unit was implemented within the IAE Lyon: the Centre Lyonnais de recherche en Gestion (Management Sciences Centre of Lyon).

The school began establishing international exchange programs in the 1980s. In 1981 the first professors’ exchange is organised with the Carlson School of Management, Minnesota, in the United States. After a major reorganization and growth period in 1982, the IAE of Lyon initiates its first student exchange programme within Europe in 1983 with the University of Kent in the United Kingdom. The first student exchange outside Europe was organised in 1986 with the University of Georgia, Athens and the Georgetown University, Washington DC in the United States.

After 2000, all the activities of the IAE Lyon were gathered at the ‘Manufacture des Tabacs’ complex. In 2003 the IAE started conforming its programmes to the Bologna process and implementing the LMD. The LMD system is based on three types of degrees: Licence in three years (bachelor), Master in five years and doctorates in eight years (PhD).

n the same year, the Equipe Universitaire de Gestion Innovante (EUGINOV) research unit was established, focusing on management practices, and the ISEOR research centre from the Lyon 2 University was transferred to the IAE Lyon.

== Campuses ==
The IAE Lyon is part of University Jean Moulin - Lyon 3 and is located mainly at the ‘Manufacture des Tabacs’ campus.

=== The ‘Manufacture des Tabacs’ complex ===
Since 2000, all of the IAE Lyon activities, except the EUGINOV organisation, are located at the ‘Manufacture des Tabacs’ complex.

To face the soaring consumption of tobacco at the start of the 20th century, the French government decided to build a new plant in Lyon on a 25,000m² site of a fortification bought from the army. Started in 1912, the construction was interrupted by the First World War. Construction resumed in 1920 and was definitively finished in 1932. At this time 2,000 employees produced up to 30 million cigarettes on a daily basis. In 1987, the production was stopped and in July 1990 the Urban Community of Lyon bought the site for thirty-five million French franc on behalf of the Jean Moulin University Lyon 3.

The redevelopment of the old building was divided into 6 stages. The first stage was finished in 1993, however, it took 13 years to complete the whole project. At the end of 2004, the building surface available was 55,104 m^{2}, with an added underground car park of 6,603 m^{2}; a total of 61,707 m^{2}.

The site is an industrial redevelopment that houses the university's management programs and facilities. This achievement is reflected in the recognition by the French Minister of Culture of the ‘Manufacture des Tabacs’ complex as a “Patrimoine du XXème siècle”.

=== The Bourg-en-Bresse campus ===
The IAE Lyon is also present in Bourg-en-Bresse

== Academics ==
IAE Lyon is a member of the IAE, a network of institutes of higher education in business administration and management at more than 30 business schools within public universities in France. Students may enroll in most IAE member Bachelors programs directly after an obtaining a Baccalauréat, or the equivalent high school diploma for international students, or in a Master's programs directly. Unlike the French Grandes écoles, public university education is open admissions, tuition is often more affordable, and registration does not require attendance at a Classe préparatoire aux grandes écoles or prépa (post-high school preparatory school). Some IAE degree programs require that applicants take an exam called the IAE Message Test (SIM) prior to admittance, but not all programs require this or any test score, although some programs are taught in English and may require additional test scores in English as a second language. The SIM exam covers these areas: general knowledge; economic and managerial culture; comprehension and written expression in French; logical and numerical reasoning; comprehension and written expression in English.

As with many IAE business schools, IAE Lyon offers Bachelor, Master, and Doctoral programmes in many academic, business administration and management subjects. Higher education degrees in France are organized into three levels thus facilitating international mobility: the Licence / Bachelor's, Master's, and Doctorate degrees. A Bachelor's degree requires the completion of 180 ECTS credits; a Master's, requires an additional 120 ECTS credits. Degrees from French public universities are recognized world-wide and awarded by the Ministry of National Education (France) (French: Le Ministère de L'éducation Nationale). In 2022, annual tuition for many IAE Bachelors programs degree taught in English-only was €262, for students from anywhere in the world.

=== Organisation ===
The IAE Lyon three main departments are teaching, research and administration. These departments are under the direct supervision of the Dean.

=== Research ===
The research is part of the fundamental public service mission assigned to French universities. The IAE Lyon created his first government appointed research centre in 1975. It included three teams focusing on different area: EURISTIK on strategy, MODEME on advanced information sciences and GRAPHOS on health care management. In 1995, two new research teams were added. IRIS specialized in marketing and OREM focusing on human resources. Two other departments were created in 2004: AFI covering the finance area and SICOMOR expanding the information sciences field. In 2006, the most recent team studying innovation and named ICOD was created.

In 2009 the research was reorganized in six Research teams and three Cross-disciplinary Research Groups covering “International Management”, “Complexity, Innovation, Networks” and “Management and Social Responsibility of Organizations”. Research activities at iaelyon School of Management are organized around a unifying theme: “Organization Management: from local to global”.

== International dimension ==
The early 80's saw the start of the internationalization process of the IAE Lyon, which increased with the years and has now become one of its main characteristics. In 2006, 1923 of the IAE students came from overseas, representing 82 nationalities.

EPAS Accreditation : In April 2008, the EFMD EPAS Accreditation Board awarded EPAS accreditation - European Programme Accreditation System - to the International Management'

=== The overseas campuses ===
In the 90's the IAE Lyon implemented a policy aiming to create programmes entirely taught overseas. Nowadays three undergraduate degrees and 19 postgraduate degrees are awarded outside France. The countries where these trainings are available are: Algeria (1), Armenia (9), Burkina Faso (1), China (2), Czech Republic (1), Hungary (1), Lebanon(1), Morocco (3), Poland (1) and Tunisia (2).

=== The programmes taught in English ===
The school offers several undergraduate and postgraduate programs taught in English. This is also for French speaking students the opportunity to study in English, prior to an overseas exchange for example.

The offer consist of one undergraduate programme, three postgraduate degrees.

The undergraduate degree:

- the Bachelor in Management and Global Business (launched in 2016)

The three postgraduate degrees are:

- the International Business Realities Program completed in two years,
- the International MBA program (launched in December 2008), executive MBA for persons with work experience
- the General Management Program completed in one year but requiring a prior year of postgraduate studies in the home country.

=== The exchange programmes ===
All the students of the IAE Lyon have the opportunity to study overseas, mainly during their third or/and fifth years. In 2018, the exchange network of the IAE Lyon is composed of 159 partner-universities throughout the world.
