= Gérard Troupeau =

Gérard Troupeau (1927 – 15 December 2010, Tours) was a French scholar agrégé of Arabic, a professor at the Institut national des langues et civilisations orientales from 1961 to 1990, and director of studies of Arabic philology at the École pratique des hautes études (IVe section).

He specialized in particular on the Christian East.

== Selected bibliography ==
- 1974: Catalogue des manuscrits arabes chrétiens de la Bibliothèque nationale (t. I, Paris, 1972 ; t. II, Paris, 1974) ;
- 1980: Les arabisants européens et le système grammatical arabe, in HISTOIRE ÉPISTÉMOLOGIE LANGAGE (HEL) 1980, vol. 02, fasc. 1
- 1995: Études sur le christianisme arabe au Moyen Âge (Variorum)
- 1976: Lexique-Index du Kitâb de Sîbawayhi.
- 2004: Observations sur la traduction latine de la description de la France dans l'abrégé de la géographie d'Edrisi in Revue de l'Occident musulman et de la Méditerranée
- Louis Massignon et le dialogue des cultures (contribution) ISBN 2-204-05270-1, 978-2-204-05270-2
- Geneviève Gobillot, Marie-Thérèse Urvoy (dir.) (collective work) L'Orient chrétien dans l'empire musulman, Éditions de Paris, Studia arabica (III) - hommage au professeur Gérard Troupeau suite au colloque organisé les 15 et 16 oct. 2004 par le CRITIC 2005 ISBN 2-85162-072-X, 978-2-85162-072-9
- 2011: Daniel Schweitz, « Gérard Troupeau : historien des Arabes chrétiens, président de société savante, érudit tourangeau », Bulletin de la Société archéologique de Touraine, LVII, (p. 38–41).
