= Judiciary of France =

Overview of France's court system

The judiciary of France is the court system, administrated by the Minister of Justice, of France. It is separated into the ordinary courts, which litigate criminal and civil cases, and the administrative courts, which supervise the government and handle complaints thereof. There are three tiers to each court: the inferior court, the intermediate appellate court and the court of last resort. The intermediate appellate court hears cases on appeal from the inferior court, and the court of last resort hears appeals from the intermediate appellate courts. Judges are appointed by the High Council of the Judiciary and serve for life unless removed, with due process, by the Council.

== Status and organisation ==
France's independent court system enjoys special statutory protection from the executive branch. Procedures for the appointment, promotion, and removal of judges vary depending on whether it is for the ordinary ("judiciaire") or the administrative stream. Judicial appointments in the judicial stream must be approved by a special panel, the High Council of the Judiciary. Once appointed, career judges serve for life and cannot be removed without specific disciplinary proceedings conducted before the council with due process.

The Ministry of Justice handles the administration of courts and the judiciary, including paying salaries or constructing new courthouses. The Ministry also funds and administers the prison system. Lastly, it receives and processes applications for presidential pardons and proposes legislation dealing with matters of civil or criminal justice. The Minister of Justice is also the head of public prosecution, though this is controversial since it is seen to represent a conflict of interest in cases such as political corruption against politicians.

At the basic level, the courts can be seen as organized into:

- ordinary courts (ordre judiciaire), which handle criminal and civil litigation, and
- administrative courts (ordre administratif), which supervise the government and handle complaints

The structure of the French judiciary is divided into three tiers:

- Inferior courts of original and general jurisdiction
- Intermediate appellate courts which hear cases on appeal from lower courts
- Courts of last resort which hear appeals from lower appellate courts on the interpretation of law.

== Law ==
=== Procedural ===
While in Germanic Europe the supreme courts can and do tend to write more verbose opinions supported by legal reasoning, the typical Francophone court of cassation decision is short, concise and devoid of explanation or justification. There is no stare decisis, or principle of precedent, binding lower courts to respect superior courts' rulings (case law) on questions of law; but a line of similar case decisions, while not precedent per se, forms the jurisprudence constante.

=== Criminal ===
Public offenses are categorized as:

- crimes, serious felonies, which are heard by the Assize Court (cour d'assises)
- délits, less serious felonies and misdemeanors, which are heard by the Criminal Court (tribunal correctionnel, also called the Correctional Court)
- contraventions, minor offenses and violations, which are heard by the Police Court (tribunal de police, also called the Police Tribunal)

For petty misdemeanors like most traffic violations, suspected offenders may either plea nolo contendere and pay a set fine amount (amende forfaitaire) or contest the charge in court. The court may then find the defendant innocent or guilty, but if found guilty, they are liable to be sentenced to pay a higher fine.

== Organization of the courts ==
French court organization

Under the system of jurisdictional dualism in France, courts are organized into two main divisions (French: ordres):

- ordinary courts (ordre judiciaire), which handle criminal and civil litigation
- administrative courts (ordre administratif), which supervise the government and handle complaints

=== Ordinary ===
The ordinary courts, also called judiciary courts, have jurisdiction over two branches of law:

- French civil law (French: droit civil), (Note: Use of the term civil law in France means private law, and should not be confused with the group of legal systems descended from Roman Law known as the civil law legal system, in contrast to the common law legal system.) which involves settling civil cases between private individuals (also known as private law; droit privé)), and
- French criminal law (droit pénal).

==== Minor jurisdiction ====
At the bottom of the court hierarchy are the courts of minor jurisdiction, which may sit as police courts (tribunal de police) to hear summary offenses (such as traffic violations, limited assault, breach of peace) or as civil courts (tribunal d'instance) to hear minor civil cases.

==== Major jurisdiction ====
The next tier are the courts of major jurisdiction. When the court hears délits, less serious felonies and misdemeanors, it is called a Criminal Court (tribunal correctionnel, also called a Correctional Court). When the court sits to hear civil matters, it is called a Civil Court (tribunal de grande instance, also called a Grand Instance Court). It has original jurisdiction over civil cases involving more than €10,000 in legal damages. Litigants are legally required to be represented by an attorney. The court also sits as a Juvenile Court (tribunal pour enfants).

These courts usually sit in panels of three judges, but some minor offenses such as traffic violations, lite drug trafficking, and misuse of credit cards and checking accounts may be heard by a single judge.

==== Specialized jurisdiction ====
The Labour Court (France) (conseil de prud'hommes) hears disputes and suits between employers and employees (apart from cases devoted to administrative courts); the court is said to be paritaire because it is composed of equal numbers of representatives from employer unions, e.g., MEDEF and CGPME, and employee unions. The Agricultural Land Tribunal (tribunal paritaire des baux ruraux) hears cases dealing with long-term leases for farm land estates. The Social security tribunal (tribunal des affaires de sécurité sociale) hears suits over welfare and state benefits. The Business Court (tribunal de commerce) hears matters involving trade and business disputes and the panel is elected from the local business community.

==== Court of Assize ====
The courts of assize (cour d'assises, also called a Court of Sessions) are located in each department of France with original and appeals jurisdiction over felony offenses. When acting as a trial court, it normally rules in panels of three judges and six (formerly nine) jurors, but in some cases (involving e.g. terrorism or illegal drug trade) the court may sit in panels of five judges without grand jury. When acting as appellate court, it rules in either panels of three judges and nine (formerly twelve) jurors or seven judges without grand jury.

==== Court of Appeal ====
The courts of appeal (cour d'appel) are limited to appellate jurisdiction and hear the bulk of appeals. They sit in panels of three judges. Appeals courts are usually organized into social security, business, civil and criminal divisions. Formerly, it required the intervention of a solicitor or case attorney (avoué) to prepare and manage the case and to act as an intermediary between the barrister and the appealing party; the functions of the avoué were abolished in 2012.

==== Court of Cassation ====
The Court of Cassation (cour de cassation) is the highest level of appeal in France. These courts sit in six chambers with fifteen judges in each; however, only seven judges need to be present to hear a case. There are more than 120 judges serving in the court.

The Court of Cassation hears appeals from the assize courts and the courts of appeal. Criminal cases are heard in only one of the court's five chambers and the court has no legal authority to deny a criminal appeal. The Court is referred to as the guardian of the law. It only reviews questions of law, not questions of fact. The Court's essential purpose is to ensure that the interpretation of the law is uniform throughout the country.

The Court is located in the Hall of Justice building in Paris. It was established in 1790 under the name Tribunal de cassation during the French Revolution, and its original purpose was to act as a court of error with revisionary jurisdiction over lower provincial prerogative courts (Parlements). However, much about the Court continues the earlier Paris Parliament Court.

=== Administrative ===
==== Financial courts ====
The financial courts - national Court of Audit (cour des comptes) and regional audit courts (chambres régionales des comptes) - have jurisdiction to try cases involving possible misuse of public funds, and, in some rare instances, of private funds.

They are empowered and mandated by Article 15 of the 1789 Declaration of the Rights of Man and of the Citizen which set forth that French citizens have the right to hold public officers, agents, and officials accountable for the finances they oversee and operate. The courts' roles and responsibilities are laid out in the Financial Court Code.

=== Jurisdictional court ===
The Jurisdictional Court, or tribunal des conflits, handles conflicts between the civil system of justice and the administrative system of justice. There are two kinds of conflicts:

- Positive conflict: both systems consider themselves competent for the same case.
- Negative conflict: both systems consider that the other system is competent for the case, resulting in a denial of justice.

In both cases, the tribunal des conflits will render final judgment on which system is competent.

=== Constitutional Council ===
The Constitutional Council (Conseil Constitutionnel) practices judicial review of legislative acts and laws. The ordinary and administrative courts have refused to perform this type of judicial review, outside of 2 exceptions in 1851. It supervises controversies of elections and performs judicial review by determining the constitutionality of parliamentary legislation.

==== Jurisdiction ====
The Court of Audit and regional audit courts mostly adjudicate cases regarding public funds, carrying out:

- Mandatory audits of public accountants to track national and local government funds.
- Discretionary audits of public corporations, publicly subsidized private organizations, and social security and welfare agencies.
- Since 1999, audits of private charities who regularly receive public donations.

Neither national or regional audit courts hear cases related to private organizations, with the few exceptions noted here. Instead, financial cases concerning private funds and money fall within the jurisdiction of the civil justice system.

Prior to 1982, France only had a single national Court of Audit. With a push toward decentralization in the creation of province-like administrative regions and the increased role of local elected officials and considering the Court's enormous docket, France saw fit to establish regional audit courts. The national court now deals primarily with the government, public establishments, and (semi-)public companies on a national level, while the regional courts handle the local level. The court may occasionally delegate national-level audits to regional courts, as is often the case with post-secondary educational facilities.

An important concept in the business of the financial courts is the difference between, in French public accountings, between ordonnateurs (managers who order expenses and perception of payments) and payeurs (the public accountants who pay expenses and recoup debts). The Court only judges public accountants; but it may also make observations about the decisions taken by the ordonnateurs, and possibly send them before other courts for mismanagement (see below).

==== Activities ====
These jurisdictions act as courts in the ordinary sense of the word in some limited circumstances. That is, they judge the accounting of public accountants (comptables publics) and may fine them in case of certain failures:

- They may fine public accountants if they are late in handing over their accounting.
- They may find that the accountant neglected to collect money owed to the state (or other government) or, through negligence, unduly gave away state (or other government) money. The responsibility of the public accountant in those circumstances is personal and unlimited, meaning that the accountant has to refund all lost money. This situation is known as débet (from Latin: "he owes"). Because of the possibility of débet, all public accountants must have external warranty as well as insurance. In practice, many débets grossly exceed the financial means of the public accountants concerned, and the Minister of Finance may end up pardoning the debt (remise gracieuse).
- They may find that somebody or some organization did accounting operations on public funds whereas they were not public accountants. In those circumstances, they are found to be de facto public accountants (comptables de fait) and they face the same constraints and penalties as de jure public accountants.

In addition, the Cour des Comptes supports and provides half of the judges of the Cour de discipline financière et budgétaire (Court of financial and budgetary discipline), the other half being provided by the Conseil d'État. This court tries ordonnateurs — that is, the persons who order expenses and the recovery of debts, may fine them for undue expenses or for sums that they should have decided to recover. However, the court cannot try government ministers, or (in almost all cases), local elected officials; thus, with few exceptions, the only ordonnateurs that face the court are civil servants.

If the Cour des Comptes or the regional chambers discern criminal behavior in the accounts that they audit, they refer the matter to the appropriate criminal court.

Most of the activity of the Cour des Comptes and the regional chambers is not of a judicial kind (juridictionnel); rather, they act as a general auditing system. However, even for these activities, they act with almost complete independence of both the executive and the legislative branches.

The court and chambers may advise, or reprimand, ministries, administrations and public establishments that they audited.

The court and chamber publish a yearly report in which it discusses a selection of misuses of funds and other incidents. In addition, they may also publish specialized reports. The court and chambers are free to inquire on whatever they wish within their field of competency; the court may also be commissioned reports by Parliament.

In all these advisory and publishing activities, the court and chambers do not limit themselves to pure accounting issues, but they also take the efficiency of public services into account. They may, for instance, criticize an expense that was legally ordered and accounted for, but which was inappropriate with respect to criteria of good financial management.

The 2001 Loi d'orientation sur les lois de finances (LOLF, law fixing the framework for budget acts) changed the way budget was passed in France: now, budget is attributed to specific missions, and the efficiency of spending on each mission is to be assessed. In that context, the court's missions will include an increased dose of assessment of efficiency.

== Principal actors ==
=== Judges ===
In France, career judges and public prosecutors are considered civil servants exercising one of the sovereign powers of the state, hence only French citizens are eligible with the notable exclusion of other EU member states citizens under the 49(4) TFEU clause.

== See also ==
- Administrative jurisdiction in France
- Law enforcement in France
- Cour d'assises
- Court of Cassation (France)
- Constitutional Council of France
- Glossary of French criminal law
- Tribunal d'instance

== General references ==
- Serge Guinchard, André Varinard and Thierry Debard, Institutions juridictionnelles (Judicials institutions), Paris, Dalloz editor, 12th edition, 2013.
- Serge Guinchard and Jacques Buisson, Criminal procedural law, Paris, Lexisnexis editor, 9th edition, 2013.
- Serge Guinchard, Cécile Chainais and Frédérique Ferrand, Civil procedure, Paris, Dalloz editor, 31st edition, 2012 ISBN 978-2247109418.
- Serge Guinchard and alii, Procedural law, Paris, Dalloz editor, 7th edition, January 2013.

=== Primary sources ===
- Code de procédure civile
- Code de procédure pénale
- Documentation française
- Code de justice administrative
- Code des juridictions financières
- La Cour des Comptes (booklet published by the Cour)

== Bibliography ==
- Terrill, Richard J. (2009). World Criminal Justice Systems: A Survey (7 ed.). Elsevier. ISBN 978-1-59345-612-2.
- Reichel, Philip L. (2002). Comparative Criminal Justice Systems: A Topical Approach (3 ed.). Prentice Hall. ISBN 0-13-091287-5.
- Reynolds, Thomas H. (1998). "Introduction to Foreign and Comparative Law". In Rehberg, Jeanne; Popa, Radu D (eds.). Accidental Tourist on the New Frontier: An Introductory Guide to Global Legal Research. F.B. Rothman. pp. 47–86. ISBN 978-0-837-71075-4.
