= Bernard Barc =

French academic and writer (1940–2021)

- Born: Bernard Andre Georges Barc; 15 February 1940; La Rochelle
- Died: 23 October 2021; Villeurbanne
- Employers: Jean Moulin University Lyon 3 (1981–2005); Nancy 2 University (1970–1978); Université Laval (1978–1980)
- Notable work: Du Temple aux Palais

Bernard Barc (February 15, 1940, La Rochelle – October 23, 2021, Villeurbanne) was a French lecturer and an author of the Bibliothèque Copte de Nag Hammadi (BCNH) volumes, as well as publications on the history of ancient Jewish hermeneutics.

== Academic work ==
From 1970 to 1978 Barc was lecturer in Biblical Hebrew and Intertestamental Literature at the Nancy 2 University, and then at the Faculté des Langues Université of the Jean Moulin University Lyon 3 from 1981 to 2005. Barc also was an invited lecturer at Université Laval in Quebec City from 1978 to 1980, as part of the French project called Bibliothèque Copte de Nag Hammadi (BCNH) Text Edition.

== Works ==
=== Thesis ===
- Barc, Bernard (1972). Contribution a l'etude du vocabulaire de la Bible (Thesis). OCLC 490276362.

=== Books ===
- ——————; Roberge, Michel (1980). L'Hyposlase des Archontes, traité gnostique sur l'origine de l'homme, du monde et des archontes, suivi de Norea par Michel. Bibliothèque copte de Nag Hammadi, section « Textes ». Vol. 5. Laval-Bruxelles, Presses de l'Université Laval (Québec), Ed. Peeters. ISBN 9782763768892. OCLC 247019987.
- —————— (1981). The gospel of Thomas revisited. Presses de l'Université Laval: Editions Peeters, Québec, Canada, Louvain, Belgique. OCLC 949186244.
- —————— (1983). Colloque international sur les textes de Nag Hammadi, Québec, 22-25 août, 1978. Bibliotheca Orientalis. Vol. 40. Leiden: Nederlands Instituut voor het Nabije Oosten. ISBN 9782763769349. OCLC 81007505.
- ——————; Strasbach, Marie-Odile (1984). Dictionnaire inversé du copte. Louvain: Peeters. ISBN 9789068310085. OCLC 877994947.
- —————— (1994). Les Fleuves du Paradis. OCLC 690384546.
- —————— (1994). Aîné et cadet dans la bible. OCLC 492669731.
- —————— (1994). La Bible d'Alexandrie : Les Nombres. La Bible d'Alexandrie. Vol. 4. ISBN 2-204-05014-8.
- ——————; Painchaud, Louis (1999). La réécriture de l'Apocryphon de Jean à la lumière de l'Hymne final de la version longue. Louvain: Uitgeverij Peeters [Typographie de Ch. Peeters]. OCLC 1338049723.
- —————— (2015). Siméon le Juste : l'auteur oublié de la Bible hébraïque. Turnhout: Brepols. ISBN 9782503553061. OCLC 919498905.
- —————— (2022). Du Sens Visible Au Sens Caché de l'Écriture. Arpenteurs du Temps : Essai Sur l'histoire Religieuse de la Judée à la Période Hellénistique. Turnhout: Brepols. ISBN 978-2-503-59481-1.

=== Edited books ===
- ——————; Funk, Wolf-Peter, eds. (1994). Le livre des secrets de Jean : recension brève : NH III, 1 et BG, 2. Les Presses de l'Université Laval; Peeters, Québec, Louvain. ISBN 9782763793801. OCLC 795492972.

=== Articles ===
- —————— (1999). "La chronologie biblique d'Adam à la mort de Moïse : Essai d'interprétation". Laval théologique et philosophique. 55 (2): 215–226. doi:10.7202/401232ar.

== Sources ==
- Abadie, Philippe; Lémonon, Jean-Pierre, eds. (2001). Le Judaïsme à l'aube de l'ère chrétienne: XVIIIe Congrès de l'ACFEB (Lyon, septembre 1999). Congrès de l'ACFEB, Association Catholique Française pour l'Étude de la Bible / 186 of Lectio divina, ISSN 0750-1919. Vol. 18. Cerf. ISBN 9782204065641.
- Coyle, J. Kevin (1981). "BARC, Bernard, ROBERGE, Michel, L'Hypostase des Archontes. Traité gnostique sur l'origine de l'homme, du monde et des Archontes (NH II, 4), suivi de. Noréa (NH IX, 2)". Laval théologique et philosophique. 37 (3): 379–380. doi:10.7202/705892ar. ISSN 0023-9054.
- Gounelle, Rémi (2013). "Bernard Barc, Wolf-Peter Funk, Le livre des secrets de Jean. Recension brève (NH XIII, 1 et BG, 2), (Bibliothèque copte de Nag Hammadi. Section Textes, 35), Québec – Louvain et al., Presses de l'Université Laval – Peeters, 2012". Revue d'histoire et de philosophie religieuses. 93 (4): 559–560.
- Mahé, Jean-Pierre, ed. (2019). Hermès Trismégiste: grec, copte, arménien : Codex VI de Nag Hammadi, Codex Clarkianus II Oxoniensis, Définitions hermétiques, Divers. Paralipomènes. Collection des universités de France. Série grecque. Vol. 546. Translated by Mahé, Jean-Pierre. Les Belles Lettres.
- Ménard, Guy; Bellavance, Eric; et al. (Canadian Corporation for Studies in Religion) (2001). "La Bibliothèque Copte de Nag Hammadi". In Larouche, Jean-Marc; Ménard, Guy (eds.). L'étude de la religion au Québec: bilan et prospective. Presses Université Laval. ISBN 9782763778358.
- Université Laval; et al. (Faculté de théologie, Faculté de philosophie) (1999). LTP. Laval théologique et philosophique, Université Laval. Vol. 55. Université Laval.
- Schmidt, Francis (1983). "Conférence de M. Francis Schmidt. In: École pratique des hautes études, Section des sciences religieuses". Annuaire. Vol. 92, 1983–1984. pp. 283–287.
