= Mauro Carbone =

Italian philosopher (born 1956)

- Born: December 8, 1956; Mantua, Italy

Mauro Carbone (born 8 December 1956) is an Italian philosopher. Since 2009, he has been a full professor at the Faculté de Philosophie of the Jean Moulin University Lyon 3 in Lyon, France. From 2012 to 2017, he has been a senior member of the Institut Universitaire de France.

== Biography ==
After studying at the University of Bologna and the University of Padua, Carbone received his PhD in 1990 at the Institut Supérieur de Philosophie of the Université catholique de Louvain, Belgium, with a dissertation entitled À partir de Cézanne et de Proust. La philosophie de l'expression de Maurice Merleau-Ponty [Moving from Cézanne and from Proust: Maurice Merleau-Ponty's philosophy of expression], awarded by the Royal Academy of Belgium. In 1993 he became a lecturer at the University of Milan, Italy, where in 2001 he was nominated associate professor of aesthetics. Three years later he inaugurated the chair of contemporary aesthetics, which he held until 2009.

Carbone is the founder of the journal Chiasmi International. Trilingual Studies concerning Merleau-Ponty’s Thought, which he co-directed since its foundation in 1999.

He has been visiting professor in France, in Mexico, at The New School for Social Research of New York (2007), at the Beida Peking University (2009) and at the Chinese University of Hong Kong (2010). During the Spring Semester 2005 he has been fellow of the Italian Academy for Advances Studies at Columbia University in New York and during the Spring Semester 2011 he was a distinguished visiting international scholar at the University of Rhode Island.

In 2005 he wrote, in collaboration with Paolo Bignamini, Condannati alla libertà [Condemned to freedom], a theatrical adaptation of Jean-Paul Sartre's novel The Age of Reason, which was staged that same year.

Between 1998 and 2000 he was a member of the Board of Directors of the International Symposium on Phenomenology, and from 2008 to 2010 he co-founded and co-directed the ENCFP (European Network in Contemporary French Philosophy) together with Miguel de Beistegui, University of Warwick (UK), Arnold Davidson, Università degli Studi di Pisa (Italy) and Frédéric Worms, École Normale Supérieure (France).

Since 2002 Carbone has been the director of the Italian book series L’occhio e lo spirito. Estetica, fenomenologia, testi plurilingui and co-director of the French book series L’œil et l’esprit. Esthétique, phénoménologie, textes plurilingues for the publishing house Mimesis. He is currently the director of the Master Program in Aesthetics and Visual Cultures at the philosophy faculty at the Jean Moulin University Lyon 3, France.

== Areas of specialization ==
Carbone initially focused his research on the phenomenology of Maurice Merleau-Ponty, specifically the intersection of perceptive and artistic experiences through the examination of Merleau-Ponty's parallel interest in the pictorial work of Paul Cézanne and the literary work of Marcel Proust. His first work published in French, La visibilité de l’invisible. Merleau-Ponty entre Cézanne et Proust (2001), was praised for its "mosaic" of voices - Franco Paracchini, in a review in Les Études philosophiques, distinguished the voices of Merleau-Ponty, of Carbone, and later of Proust and Cézanne, and admired the overview of the landscape of Merleau-Ponty's thought created by Carbone.

Such a direction of study has broadened, at first, to a larger consideration of phenomenology, and, later on, to that of the post-structuralist thought developed in France, even if still remaining bound to the parallel interest towards the philosophical reflection on modern painting and literature. Such a widening has led Carbone's studies to facing gnoseological and ontological topics, pushing him to examine the traditional relationship between philosophy and “non-philosophy”.

More recently, such directions have turned out in a reflection on the peculiar status of images in our time, on the possible ethical and political implications of our relationship with them, and on the ontological dimension of the “Being in common” that would find its expression in such implications. This reflection is currently devoted to examine the influence of screens – understood as optical apparatuses by now dominant – on our collective and personal individuation.

Mauro Carbone has edited, among other works, the Italian edition of four Merleau-Ponty writings (Il visibile e l’invisibile, Bompiani, Milano, 1993; Linguaggio Storia Natura. Corsi al Collège de France, 1952–1961, Bompiani, Milano, 1995; La natura. Lezioni al Collège de France 1956-1960, Milano, Raffaello Cortina, 1996, È possible oggi la filosofia? Lezioni al Collège de France, 1958-1959 e 1960–1961, Milano, Raffaello Cortina, 2003, 20112), of a work by Jan Patočka Saggi eretici sulla filosofia della storia (Torino, Einaudi, 2008) and one by Ernst Cassirer, Eidos ed Eidolon. Il problema del bello e dell’arte nei dialoghi di Platone (Milano, Raffaello Cortina, 1998, 20092).

== Thought ==
The main influence on Mauro Carbone's thought has been that of Maurice Merleau-Ponty. Carbone has developed in a theoretically personal way certain notions that the French philosopher only managed to sketch before his sudden death. Among these, the notion of “sensible idea” stands out, meant as the becoming essence inaugurated in our encounter with the sensible, and from the sensible remaining inseparable, lying at work in a peculiar retroflected temporality that Carbone, along with Merleau-Ponty, calls “mythical time”.

Carbone's two volumes Ai confini dell'esprimibile. Merleau-Ponty a partire da Cézanne e da Proust (1990) and Una deformazione senza precedenti. Marcel Proust e le idee sensibili (2004) form a diptych devoted to the notion of "sensible idea". In the latter volume, Carbone synthesizes the philosophical implications of the above-mentioned notions in the original idea of “unprecedented deformation”, by which he means to characterize the peculiar status that, in his opinion, the deformation assumes in the art of the Twentieth Century in order to leave behind the mimetic principle of representation and thus the conception of model meant as a preliminary given form.

According to what Leonard Lawlor wrote in a review in Continental Philosophy Review, "An Unprecedented Deformation seems to open onto something like a meta- or super-philosophical level". In other words, with this book, Carbone develops also a critical thought about the status of Philosophy itself, reconsidering the way we actually think.

Later on, another notion began to connect to the above-mentioned ones, namely, that of mutual precession between imaginary and real, which Carbone proposed – by developing a Merleau-Pontian formulation – so as to account for the producing of the peculiar retroflected temporality called mythical time. Moreover, Carbone attempted to develop the ethical and political implications of the conception of memory connected to the idea of unprecedented deformation in his reflection on the event of 9/11. Carbone highlighted the irreducible visual feature of 9/11, and thus approached it from an aesthetic perspective. He also searched the ontological roots of such ethical and political implications in the thought of Maurice Merleau-Ponty, Jan Patocka, Gilbert Simondon and Gilles Deleuze, proposing the notions of “a-individual” and “dividual” so as to point out the intimate relational issue of any identity (and hence its becoming and its divisibility).

== Fellowships, awards and scientific recognition ==
- 1985 – Fellowship of the Communauté française de Belgique at the "Institut Supérieur de Philosophie" of the Catholic University of Louvain, Belgium.
- 1987 – Special mention for the Specialisation degree thesis at the competition for the Award for Philosophical Sciences of the "Ministero dei Beni Culturali e Ambientali" (Italy).
- 1988 – Fellowship of the Communauté française de Belgique at the "Institut Supérieur de Philosophie" of the Catholic University of Louvain, Belgium.
- 1993 – Award for the best PhD thesis, in the category "Lettres"at the annual competition of the Académie Royale des Sciences, des Lettres et des Beaux-Arts of Belgium.
- 2005 – Fellowship at the Italian Academy for Advanced Studies in America, Columbia University, New York.
- 2005 – "Viaggio a Siracusa" Prize, awarded (ex aequo) to the book Una deformazione senza precedenti as the best Italian philosophical essay published in 2004.
- 2009 – "Maurizio Grande" International Prize, for cinematographic essays, awarded (ex aequo) to the book Sullo schermo dell’estetica. La pittura, il cinema e la filosofia da fare.
- 2005–2011 – Associate Fellow at the Department of Philosophy of the University of Warwick (UK).
- 2011 – University of Rhode Island Distinguished Visiting International Scholar.
- 2012–2017 – Senior member of the Institut Universitaire de France.

== Works ==
1. Ai confini dell'esprimibile. Merleau-Ponty a partire da Cézanne e da Proust, Milano, Guerini e Associati, 1990, 19952, 19983.
2. Il sensibile e l'eccedente. Mondo estetico, arte, pensiero, Milano, Guerini e Associati, 1996.
3. Di alcuni motivi in Marcel Proust, Milano, Libreria Cortina,1998.
4. La visibilité de l’invisible. Merleau-Ponty entre Cézanne et Proust, Hildesheim, Georg Olms Verlag, 2001.
5. La carne e la voce. In dialogo tra estetica ed etica, Milano, Mimesis, 2003 (with David Michael Levin).
6. The Thinking of the Sensible. Merleau-Ponty's A-Philosophy, Evanston (IL), Northwestern University Press, 2004.
7. Una deformazione senza precedenti. Marcel Proust e le idee sensibili, Macerata, Quodlibet, 2004; broadened edition: Proust et les idées sensibles, French tr. by S. Kristensen revised by P. Rodrigo and by the author, Paris, Vrin, 2008; English tr. by N. Keane, An unprecedented Deformation: Marcel Proust and the Sensible Ideas, Albany (NY), SUNY Press, 2010.
8. Essere morti insieme. L’evento dell’11 settembre 2001, Torino, Bollati Boringhieri, 2007; broadened French edition tr. by M. Logoz, Geneva, Mētispresses, 2013.
9. Sullo schermo dell’estetica. La pittura, il cinema e la filosofia da fare, Milano, Mimesis, 2008.
10. Merleau-Ponty, la chair des images: entre peinture et cinéma, Paris, Vrin, 2011.
