= Guy Achard =

French Latinist and historian (born 1936)

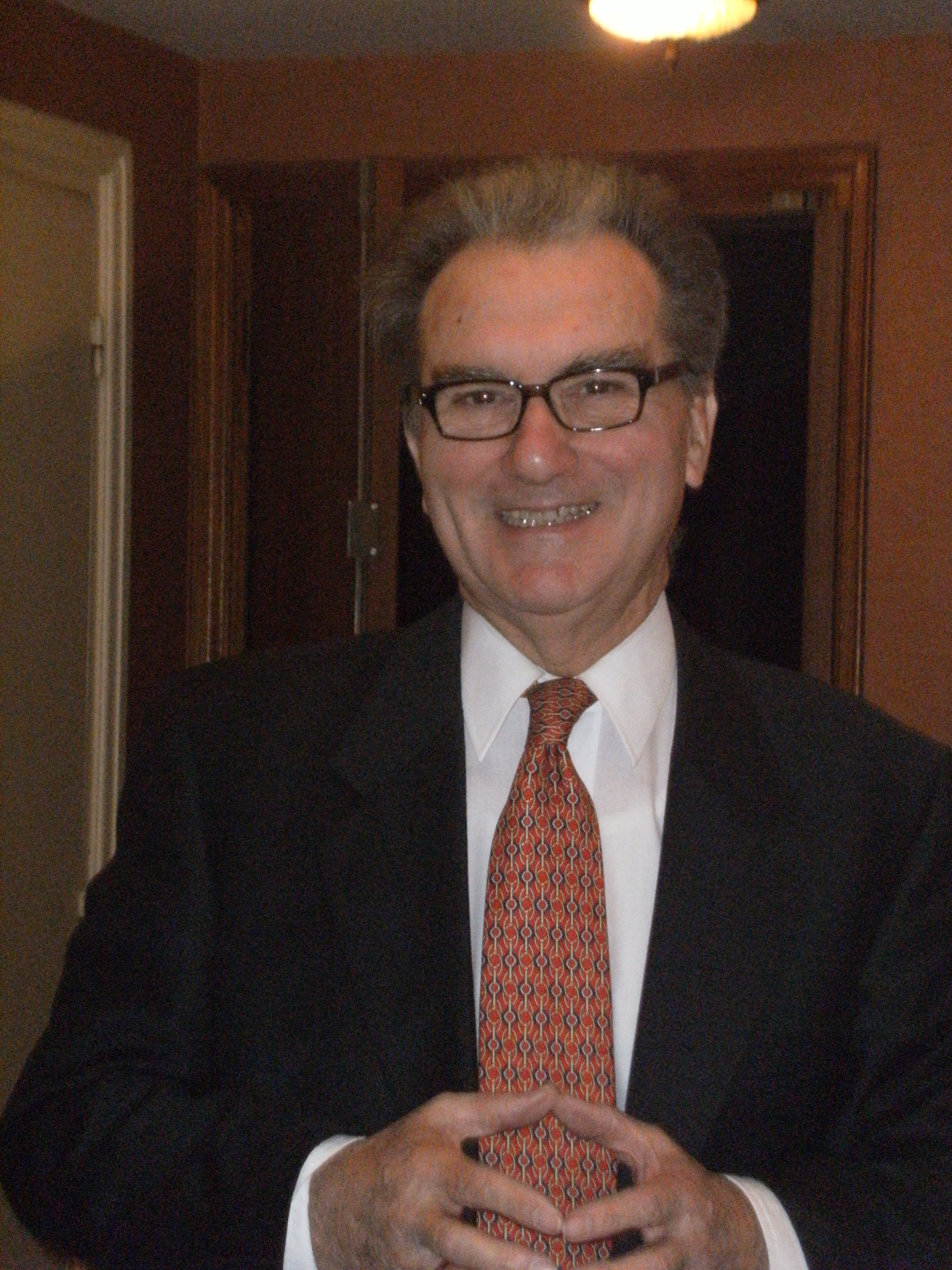
- Guy Achard in 2009.
- Born: 1936
- Education: doctorate in France
- Alma mater: Jean Moulin University Lyon 3
- Occupation: University teacher

Guy Achard (born 1936 in Lyon) is a French Latinist and historian of Ancient Rome. An emeritus professor at the Jean Moulin University Lyon 3, he is a specialist in Latin rhetoric and Roman sociology.

== Publications ==
- Pratique rhétorique et idéologie politique dans les discours 'Optimates' de Cicéron. Mnémosyne. Leyde, Netherland: Brill Publishers. 1981. pp. 546. ISBN 90-04-06374-9.
- Guy Achard (1989). La langue des inscriptions latines de la Gaule. Lyon: Centre d'Études Romaines et Gallo-Romaines (C.E.R.G.R.). ISBN 2-904974-06-7.
- La Communication à Rome. Realia. Paris: Les Belles Lettres. 1991. p. 298. ISBN 2-251-33821-7.
- Cicéron : De l'invention, éd. traduction et commentaire, Paris, Les Belles Lettres, coll. des Universités de France, Paris, 1994; ISBN 2-25101381-4.
- La Femme à Rome, Paris, Presses universitaires de France, coll. « Que sais-je ? », 1995, 128 p.; éd. roumaine, Bucarest, Corint, 2004 ISBN 2-13-046864-0.
- Néron, Paris, Presses universitaires de France, coll. « Que sais-je? », 1995, 128 p.; éd. roumaine, Bucarest, Corint, 2004; éd. japonaise, Tokyo, Hakusuisha, 2016, ISBN 2-13-047286-9.
- Orateur, Auditeurs, Lecteurs. À propos de l'éloquence romaine à la fin de la République et au début du Principat, éd. et direction avec Marie Ledentu, Lyon, coll. du C.E.R.O.R., 2000 117 p. ISBN 2-904974-20-2.
- Tite-Live : Histoire romaine, l. XXXIII, translation and commentaries, Paris, Les Belles Lettres, coll. des Universités de France, 2001, 211 p. including 70 doubles, and 2 maps. ISBN 2-251-01422-5.
- La Com' au pouvoir, Limoges, éd.Fyp. coll. Présence, 2011, 221 p. ISBN 978-2-916571-52-2.
- Parole, media, pouvoir dans l'Occident romain. Hommages offerts au Professeur Guy Achard, collected and published by Marie Ledentu, Lyon, coll. du C.E.R.O.R. 2007, 535 p. ISBN 978-2-904974-32-8.
