= Bariza Khiari =

French politician

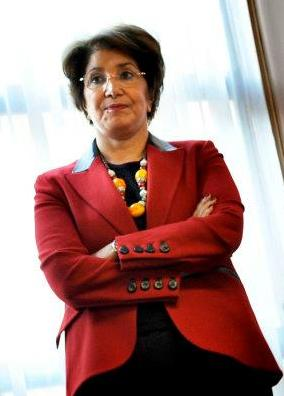
- Bariza Khiari

Member of the French Senate for Paris
- In office 2004–2017

Personal details
- Born: Bariza Debbah; 3 September 1946 (age 80) Ksar Sbahi, French Algeria
- Party: Socialist Party; La République En Marche!
- Children: 3
- Education: University of Paris

Bariza Khiari (born 3 September 1946) is a member of the Senate of France, representing the city of Paris. She was a member of the Socialist Party and moved to La République En Marche in 2017. She is married and has three children. She has also been a knight of the French National Order of Merit since 2001.

She received her diploma in advanced studies and a Master of Business Administration from the Institut d'administration des entreprises of the University of Paris in 1981.

At the professional level Bariza Khiari was, until March 2004, regional delegate for tourism in the Île-de-France and a departmental delegate of national education from Paris.
