= IAE Paris Sorbonne Business School =

French business school

Sorbonne Business School
- Institut d'administration des entreprises de Paris
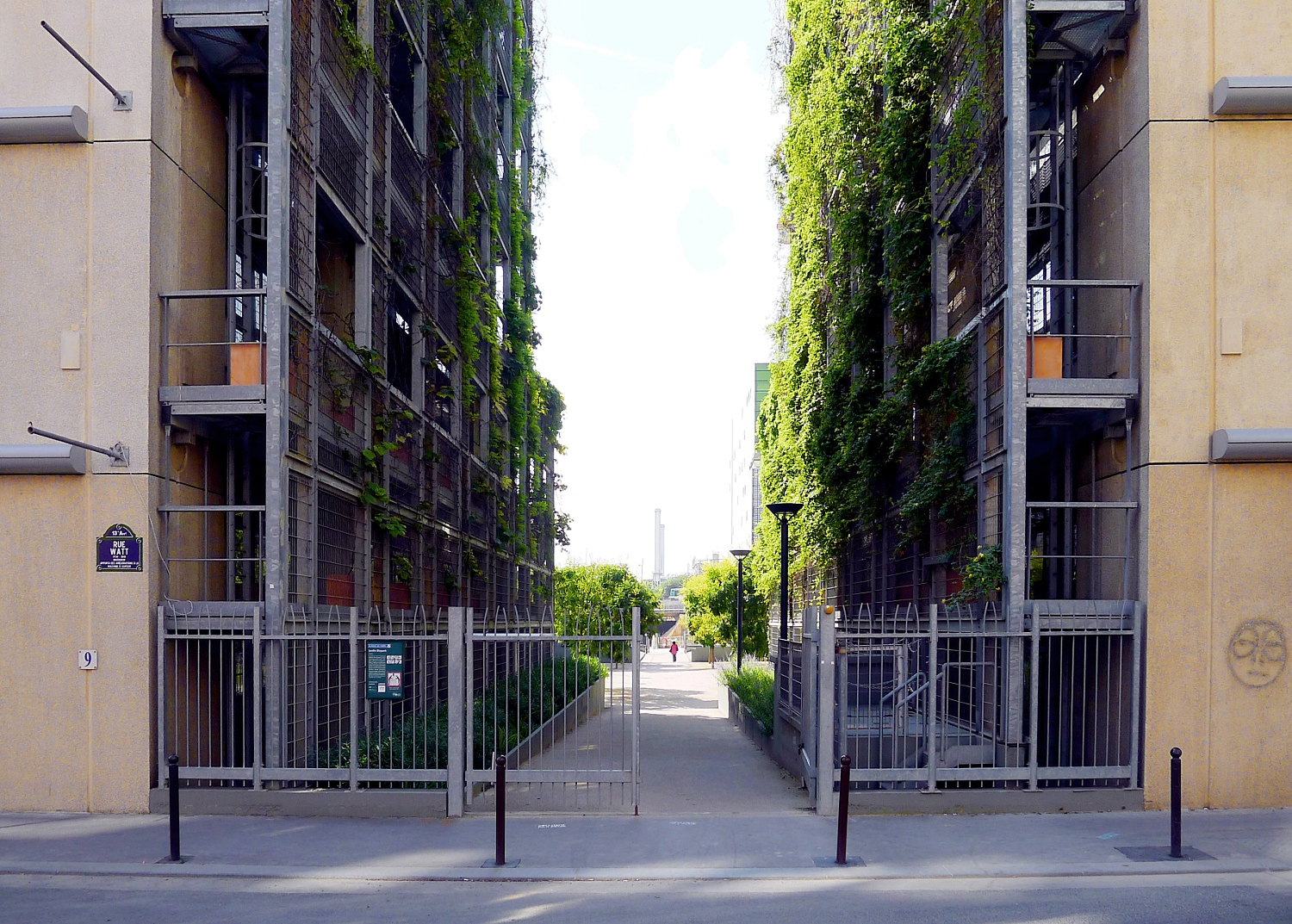
- Type: Public University
- Established: 1956
- Parent institution: University of Paris 1 Pantheon-Sorbonne
- President: Éric Lamarque
- Administrative staff: 400
- Students: 2800
- Location: Paris, France
- Campus: Paris
- Affiliations: IAE; G16+
- Website: http://www.iae-paris.com/en
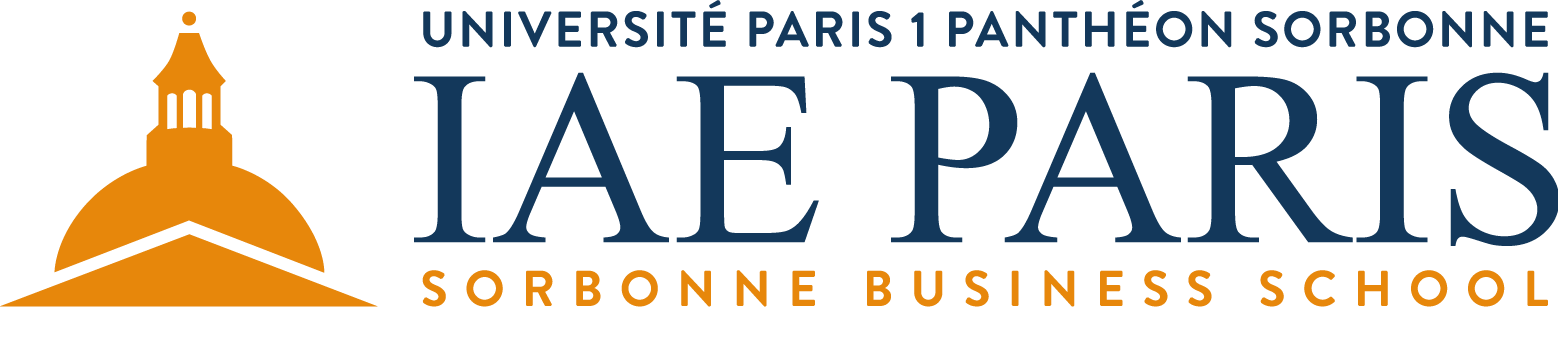

IAE Paris Sorbonne Business School (also known in French as IAE Paris, short for Institut d'administration des entreprises de Paris) is a public business school, part of the University of Paris 1 Panthéon-Sorbonne in Paris, France. It is part of the IAE network.

Located in Paris, IAE Paris Sorbonne Business School welcomes over 2,800 students each year and has graduated more than 39,000 managers and executives since its inception in 1956. These graduates occupy positions of responsibility across all sectors of the economy in France and internationally. Its educational programs, in both initial education and executive programs, cater to students, corporate executives and managers, and professionals in private practice. The school is currently led by Professor Eric Lamarque.

== History ==
IAE Paris Sorbonne Business School was founded in 1956 by Gaston Berger and Professor Robert Goetz. It is a public administrative institution under the supervision of the Ministry of Higher Education and affiliated with the University of Paris 1 Panthéon-Sorbonne. The affiliation became an association in 2014, following the Law on Higher Education and Research.

Initially, only one program was offered: the Certificate of Aptitude for Business Administration (CAAE), aimed at providing a dual skill set in management similar to the American MBA. The CAAE evolved into a specialized higher studies diploma (DESS) in 1974 and then into a professional Master's in Business Administration (MAE) in 2006. IAE Paris's primary mission was to train professionals in management. It was one of the three French institutions, along with HEC (HEC's Executive MBA program) and INSEAD, specialized in delivering an equivalent to the Harvard MBA.

== Education ==
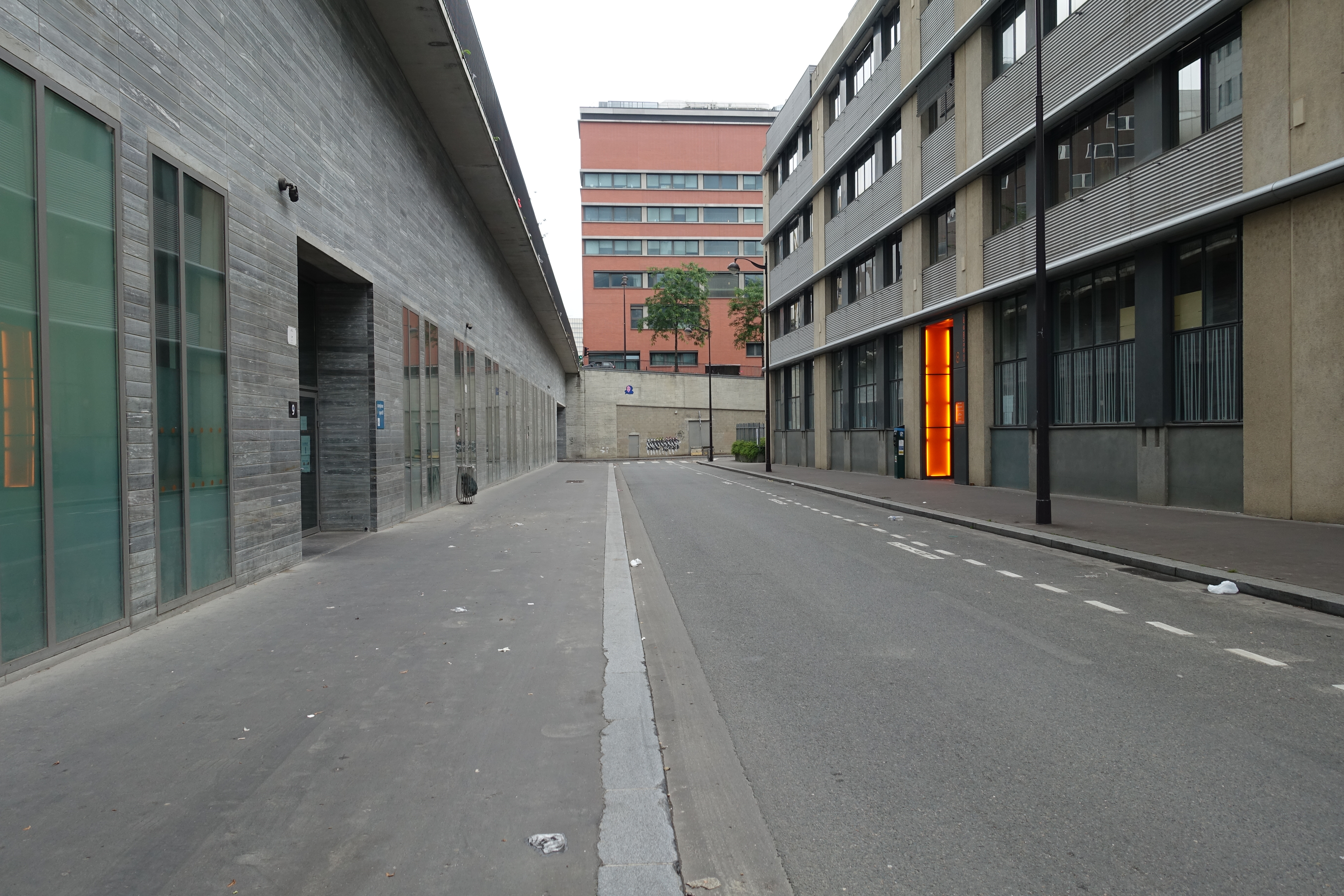
Entrance of the school, on the street side.

Since its inception, IAE's education has been centered on the case method, a core aspect of MBA teaching established by the Harvard Business School, which Gaston Berger introduced in France.

The institute offers graduate and postgraduate diploma programs, mainly masters and MBAs in business administration, finance, management control, audit, marketing, human resources, and management of associations, as well as a PhD programs in management sciences. More recently, IAE Paris has introduced a specialized bachelor's degree in retail commerce.

Admission into IAE is highly selective, requiring not only good academic records but also a specific entrance test score (Score IAE-Message) covering logical reasoning, French, English, and general knowledge. IAE looks for candidates who value merit and public interest, emphasizing sincerity over calculated interests.

=== Executive programs ===
Education for working professionals is the institute's historical mission. Continuing education students still represent two-thirds of the student body. They can choose from generalist MBA (MAE) and specialized (Executive Masters) programs. The MBA is a generalist diploma in management, aimed at executives with at least three to five years of experience. It enables professionals to acquire dual competency in management and the necessary leadership for executive roles. The MBA-MAE is offered in various formats, with varying degrees of international exposure, full-time or part-time.

== Research ==
Research is a fundamental aspect of IAE Paris Sorbonne Business School, embedded in its academic DNA. The institution engages in pure management research or interdisciplinary studies, including economics. Students are encouraged to undertake theses with a strong academic dimension, fostering a critical perspective and the ability to engage with scholarly debates and scientific reasoning. This approach aims to instill a culture of critical inquiry and skepticism towards management practices.

IAE Paris Sorbonne Business School houses 7 research chairs involved in societal subjects linked to management, whether on public-private partnerships, alternative financing of the agricultural sector, the governance of financial cooperatives, changes in companies, transformation territories, risk management or brand.

=== EPPP Chair - Economics of Public-Private Partnerships ===
Established in 2009, this chair examines the broad spectrum of public-private partnerships, including concessions, partnership contracts, and public procurement. Directed by Stéphane Saussier, it collaborates with both public and private sector partners like CDC Habitat, Suez, Vinci, Artimon, and France Stratégie.

=== ETI Chair - Territorial Entrepreneurship and Innovation ===
This chair explores how to generate economic, social, and environmental value within territories. It investigates the effects of technological, ecological, and societal changes on urban development, smart cities, and entrepreneurship across different types of territories.

=== FINAGRI Chair - Alternative Financing in the Agricultural Sector ===
Philippe Dessertine heads this chair, which focuses on addressing the financial challenges and sustainability objectives of the agricultural sector amid budget constraints. Partners include Agro, InVivo, Saipol, Groupama, and Sodebo.

=== Brands & Values Chair ===
Directed by Géraldine Michel, this research chair aims to enhance knowledge exchange on brand management challenges such as employer branding, responsible brands, and consumer-brand interactions on social media. It collaborates with partners across marketing, HR, strategy, finance, and legal sectors.

=== MAI Chair - Changes-Anticipations-Innovations ===
The chair focuses on understanding societal changes and their impact on employment, skills, and work. It aims to identify and discuss social innovations, collaborating with organizations like the CFDT and Pôle emploi.

=== MGCF Chair - Management and Governance of Financial Cooperatives ===
This chair, directed by Éric Lamarque, is a partnership with Groupe BPCE and focuses on research related to the management and governance of financial cooperatives, aiming to contribute to the sector's development.

=== RISKS Chair - Security, Organization, Uncertainty, and Norm ===
This multidisciplinary team researches risk, emphasizing the systemic, global, and complex nature of risks today. It examines risk perception and the adaptation of organizational processes in uncertain and complex environments.

== Partnerships ==
IAE Paris Sorbonne Business School is part of G16+, a club that brings together career services leaders from 23 of France's most prestigious schools, including HEC Paris, INSEAD, ESSEC, EDHEC, EM Lyon, ESCP, Polytechnique (X), École Centrale Paris, ESTP, ENSAM, SUPAERO SUPELEC, ENA, Sciences Po Paris, and École normale supérieure de Paris Ulm.

== Alumni ==
IAE Paris alumni are organized under the IAE Paris Alumni association. Currently, there are over 39,000 graduates working in companies worldwide.

Notable alumni include:

- Princess Astrid of Liechtenstein, founder and owner of Crown Designs
- Philippe Bourguignon, Vice CEO of Revolution Resorts, board member of eBay and Meetic. Former CEO of Euro Disney and Vice President of the Walt Disney Company (Europe), ex-CEO of Club Méditerranée, former executive director of the World Economic Forum in Davos, Canal+, and the newspaper Libération.
- Didier Benedetti, member of the executive board and executive committee of the AREVA group.
- Gérald Karsenti, CEO of HP France, affiliated professor at HEC Paris.
- Jacques Lanxade, former admiral of the French National Navy, former Chief of Staff to the President of the Republic, and former Chief of the French Armed Forces, former ambassador to Tunisia.
- Bariza Khiari, French politician, Socialist senator of Paris.
- Dominique Le Tourneau, canonist, writer, and French clergyman.
- Jocelyne N'Guessan, Franco-Ivorian businesswoman.
- Jean-Christian Petitfils, French historian and writer.
- Jean-François Hénin, French businessman, currently President of Maurel et Prom.
- Michel Rousseau, professor and company economist. Founder of the think tank, Fondation Concorde.
- Pinaki Bhattacharya, activist, physician and corporate professional.
