= Serge Guinchard =

French jurist (born 1946)

Serge Guinchard (born May 9, 1946) is a French jurist who formerly taught at the Law School of Dakar and Jean Moulin University Lyon 3 and most recently at Panthéon-Assas University, where he is now Professor emeritus. He has also held political posts in the metropolitan government of Lyon.

== Education ==
Guinchard was born in the 4th arrondissement of Lyon and was educated in Caluire-et-Cuire and the northern suburbs of Lyon. After completing his secondary education in Lyon, he studied at the Faculty of Law of Lyon. He obtained his J.D. in 1974 and the Agrégation in law the year afterward.

== Academic career ==
From November 1969 to September 1974 Guinchard was an Assistant in the Faculty of Law at the University of Lyon 2, then at Jean Moulin University Lyon 3 after its creation. He then became a lecturer at Lyon 3 until December 1975. From January 1976 to September 1980, he was a professor in the Faculty of Law at Dakar University, heading the Private Law Section from October 1978. He then returned to the University Jean Moulin Lyon III, serving as director of the insurance section then of the Institute of Judicial Studies; he was Dean of the Faculty from May 1982 to September 1988. In 1988 he moved to Panthéon-Assas University (Paris 2), where he was director of the Institute of Judicial Studies for ten years, from 1990 to 2000. In 2001–02, he headed the Center for Research into Justice and Alternative Modes of Conflict Resolution, then from October 2001 to July 2003, he was director of the Center for Permanent Training.

He also served outside the university in several capacities: in 1988–89 and 1993–94, as head of the specialist commission on the legal disciplines for the French University of the Pacific; from 1992 to 1999 as a member of the Commission on Education for the National Council of Bar Associations; from 1991 to 1993 as director of the Bar Association training school for the Paris Court of Appeal; from 1996 to 2000 as a member of the administrative board of the National School for the Judiciary; and from 2000 to 2003 as director of legal studies at the École Normale Supérieure. He also served on the jury for the national agrégation in private law and forensic science: in 1984, 1988–89, and 2000–01, and from January 1992 to December 1995 was president of the National Council of Universities of which he was a member from 1987 to 1995 and again in 2000.

From 2003 his career became focused on administration when he became rector of the Academy of Guadeloupe, then in 2005 took up the same position at Rennes, which he held for a year.

In June 2007 he became Professor Emeritus at Panthéon-Assas University, (Note: Emeritat granted by vote of the board of Panthéon-Assas University, June 17, 2007.) and in May 2010 a Festschrift was published in his honour.

== Legal reports ==
Guinchard has produced numerous reports at the request of international organizations and of the French and Senegalese Ministries of Justice (France and Senegal), many of which led to legislation:

=== French Ministry of Justice ===
- Chairman of the Commission named for him established on January 18, 2008, by Minister of Justice Rachida Dati, concerning the distribution of first instance civil litigation and possible civil diversions (including the issue of transferral to notaries of divorce by mutual consent) and criminal diversions. Report submitted June 30, 2008. The report contains 65 proposals for reform; as of 22 December 2010, 26 had been enacted into law.
- Chairman of the Commission established on November 28, 2002, by Minister of Justice Dominique Perben on the quality of civil justice. Specifically, implementation of a working group on training local judges and lay judges. Reports submitted in January and March 2003. Commission's work behind the decree No. 2004-836 of 20 August 2004 on the reform of civil procedure.
- Chairman of a working group established by Minister of Justice Jacques Toubon on foreclosure reform of foreclosure, July 1996–June 1997. Bill introduced in November 2005, became Ordinance No. 2001-461 of 21 April 2006.

=== Senegalese Ministry of Justice ===
- Co-author of draft law on commercial companies and draft code, which became the fourth part of the Code of Obligations after its adoption by the Senegalese National Assembly.

=== Council of Europe ===
- Expert assessment of judicial system and criminal procedure in Armenia with respect to its becoming a member of the Council of Europe and the European Convention for the Protection of Human Rights and Fundamental Freedoms; expert mission to Yerevan, September 1996; summary report submitted in 1997.

=== NATO ===
- Summary report in October 1974 on research concerning consumer protection under French and Canadian law, funded by a research grant (Laval University, July 1973; University of Montreal, September 1974).

== Research and doctrinal positions ==
=== Comparative law ===
Recognizing the importance of studies in comparative law for training lawyers, Guinchard pursued such studies beginning with his second doctorate, for which his dissertation compared French and Swiss law. He studied the university system in Quebec in 1971 and in 1973–74 returned for a study of consumer protection under a NATO grant. As dean of the Faculty of Law at Lyon (1982–88), one of his concerns was the development of exchanges with other European and with American universities including Boston University, the University of North Carolina, Chapel Hill, Georgetown University, the University of Minnesota, Minneapolis, and Saint Louis University, Missouri. He instituted seminars in foreign law conducted by visiting professors from countries including Germany, Belgium, Canada, and Israel. When in 1995 he founded the law review Justice, published by Dalloz, he included a section on judicial systems in other countries, and also included such coverage in the journal Droit et procédures, where he headed the scientific committee, then the peer.

=== Human rights ===
From the beginning of his doctoral studies in 1969, Serge Guinchard became interested in fields other than trial law, such as consumer protection and civil law. Some of his writings are outspoken, even caustic and cover responsibility for miscarriages of justice, and his books include proposals for reform. Some of these have led to changes in the law, (Note: Thus the time limit for the exercise of certain judicial functions (Act of June 25, 2001), a non-exclusive focus on recruiting student competitions (Act of June 25, 2001, which perpetuates the contest called complementary and law of 5 March 2007 that passes the "turn out" a third of the other recruits instead of fifth) and more focused on the verification of proper legal knowledge and personal qualities of candidates (from 2009, introduction of written tests of civil and criminal proceedings in recruitment competitions) the prohibition against concurrent judicial functions with belonging to an arbitration paid by the parties of the implementation of disciplinary responsibility of judges direct appeal to the Supreme Judicial Council on the initiative of individuals (see Organic Law No. 2010-830 of 22 July 2010 incorporated into the statutory order of December 22, 1958).) while others have not. (Note: See his proposal to ban judges from receiving any decoration of the Executive by reason of their professional activity on behalf of separation of powers and like the parliamentarians and ministers, which was never resumed, the judges may still receive decorations.) He has harshly criticized the function of the Court of Cassation, the French supreme court, and contributed to the debate on judges' being Freemasons, regularly updated his contribution to the Dalloz Encyclopedia of Civil Procedure concerning the liabilities incurred due to miscarriages of public justice, and has studied judicial actions that may constitute a threat to human rights. and written on the removal of judges. In his writings he focuses on the assurance of rights as it emerges from the jurisprudence of the European Court of Human Rights or, more recently, that of the Constitutional Council on priority issues of constitutionality, particularly in the areas of criminal procedure and jurisprudence.

=== Consumer protection ===
In 1970, Serge Guinchard proposed a series of consumer protection reforms, including the ability to give consumers the benefit of legal actions traditionally reserved for economic agents in competition law to stop illegal practices, the right to pursue collective action in defense of their combined affected interests,

The latter proposal made him a recognized expert in the French class action. He was also interested in issues of misleading advertising, the right of legal action for consumer associations. Abroad, Article 138a, § 2 of the Belgian judicial code (in the wording of the Act of December 3, 2006) follows this reflection.

=== Civil law and Muslim law ===
Guinchard wrote half of the definitions of y legal terms in the 1970 first edition of Civil Law Glossary in 1970, which he co-directs and has devoted his doctoral thesis in law (defended in June 1974)The allocation of property in French private law: testing a general theory.

His work on Heritage Trust have inspired the legislature to adopt the Trust into French law Article 2011, in which heritage institutions, separate from the personal assets of the Trustee or the individual entrepreneur, are assigned to a specific purpose in the deed of trust or in the founding of the proprietorship,

In Senegal, where he was seconded as a professor at the Faculty of Law of Dakar from January 1976 to September 1980, Guinchard contributed, to disseminate knowledge of Senegalese family law, including the Islamic law of estates), and, to reform the company law of this State. He published the first book addressing the legal status of Muslim in this country estates.

=== Justice and legal proceedings ===
On this field, author Bertrand Lissarague called him a "lord of the proceedings" in the liber amicorum offered in May 2007.

== Political activities ==
Guinchard was Deputy Mayor of Lyon for two terms, from 1983 to 1995, and Vice-President of the Urban Community of Lyon from 1989 to 1995.

== Honors ==
Serge Guinchard has received the following honors for his studies and publications:

- For his doctoral dissertation, La publicité mensongère en droit français et en droit fédéral suisse: étude comparative de l'autonomie au civil et au pénal d'un délit économique, 1971:
  - Award of the Legislative Academy
  - 1st prize, French Center for Comparative Law
  - Ministry of Education award of funds for publication
- For his state doctoral thesis in law, L’affectation des biens en droit privé français,
  - 1st prize, Superior Council of Notaries at Law in France
  - 1st prize, National Association of Doctors of Law
- Henri Texier Prize for the defense of individual liberty, Academy of Moral and Political Sciences, 2000, for Procédure pénale, co-authored with Jacques Buisson.

In addition he has received the following awards:

- Medal of Honor of the Paris Bar, September 1993
- Medal of Honor of the National Chamber of Lawyers of the Appeals Courts, June 2004
- Medal of Honor of the Prefecture of Guadeloupe, September 2005
- 2008 Prize of the Association of European Mediators (Note: The Association presented the same award in 2010 to Yves Repiquet, president of the National Consultative Commission on Human Rights and in 2011 to Christine Lagarde, Minister of Finance.)

=== Decorations ===
- Knight of the Legion of Honor, 2005, bestowed by François Fillon, Minister of Education
- Officer of the National Order of Merit, bestowed 2008
- Commander of the Ordre des Palmes académiques (knight, 1987; officer, 2001; commander, 2003

== Publications ==
=== Editor ===
Serge Guinchard has edited or headed the editorial boards of the following publications:

- Encyclopédie Dalloz de procédure civile, since 1992
- Lexique de termes juridiques, since 1987 (co-director; published annually, 21st ed. 2013)
- Droit et pratique de la procédure civile
- Droit et pratique des voies d'exécution
- Delict - general discussion of this term in civil law jurisdictions.
- General oral entrance examination for regional lawyer training centers: Préparation au grand oral, Lextenso / Gazette du Palais, published annually
- "Hypercours" book series, Dalloz, co-director since 1999. For the subseries "Droit privé", 18 volumes.
- Comment devenir avocat? sub-series within Carrières judiciaires book series, Lextenso / Gazette du Palais, since 1994
- Chairman of reading committee and board of the journal Droit et procédures, Revue des huissiers de justice
- Co-editor of the review Justices (1995–98); then editor of Justice (2000–01
- Co-editor of Revue générale des procédures (1998–99)

=== Theses ===
- La publicité mensongère en droit français et en droit fédéral suisse: étude comparative de l'autonomie au civil et au pénal d'un délit économique. Dissertation, 1970. Bibliothèque de sciences criminelles 13. Paris: Librairie générale de droit et de jurisprudence, 1971. OCLC 802895013
- L’affectation des biens en droit privé français. Dissertation, 1974 (as Essai d'une théorie générale de l'affectation des biens en droit privé français). Bibliothèque de droit privé 145. Paris: Librairie générale de droit et de jurisprudence 1976. ISBN 9782275013985

=== Books ===
Guinchard is co-author, lead author, author or editor of the following books, which have been published in several updated editions and in some cases translated into other languages.

- Procédure civile. Précis. Paris: Dalloz. Published biennially in alternation with Hypercours. 30th ed. 2010. ISBN 9782247050208. 25th ed. translated into Chinese, ISBN 9787800837661. (with Jean Vincent, beginning with 20th ed., 1981)
- Procédure civile. Hypercours Dalloz. Published biennially in alternation with Précis. Paris: Dalloz 2009, 2nd ed. 2011. ISBN 9782247079551 (with Cecile Chainais and Frédérique Ferrand)
- Institutions judiciaires: organisation, juridictions, gens de justice. Précis Dalloz. Paris: Dalloz. From 9th ed. retitled Institutions juridictionnelles. 11th ed. 2011. ISBN 9782247110117. 5th ed. translated into Chinese. (with Jean Vincent and others)
- Droit et pratique de la procédure civile: droits interne et de l'Union européenne. Dalloz action. Paris: Dalloz. 7th ed. 2012. ISBN 9782247103966 (editor)
- Droit et pratique des voies d'exécution. Dalloz action. Paris: Dalloz. 7th ed. 2012. ISBN 9782247129348 (editor with Tony Moussa)
- Procédure pénale. Manuel. Paris: Litec / LexisNexis. Published annually. 8th ed. 2012. ISBN 9782711016204 (with Jacques Buisson).
- Droit processuel: Droits fondamentaux du procès. Précis. Paris: Dalloz. 7th ed. 2013. ISBN 9782247124817 (with Cécile Chainais and others)
- Lexique des termes juridiques. Paris: Dalloz. Published annually. 20th ed. 2012. ISBN 9782247116935. Translated into Spanish, Japanese and Portuguese. (with Thierry Debard and others).
- Comment devenir avocat. Carrières judiciaires. Paris: Lextenso / Gazette du Palais. Published annually. 10th ed. 2013. ISBN 978-2359710601
- Préparation au grand oral de l'examen d'entrée dans un Centre de formation d'avocats. Carrières judiciaires. Paris: Lextenso / Gazette du Palais. Published annually. 8th ed. 2013. ISBN 978-2359710595

== Notes ==
=== References ===
- Coulon, Jean-Marie, ed. (2010). Justices et droit du procès: du légalisme procédural à l'humanisme processuel. Mélanges en l'honneur de Serge Guinchard. Dalloz. ISBN 978-2-247-08525-5.
- Gindre, François; Verney-Carron, Georges (2010). Ceci n'est pas un parc: Art, Architecture, design. Lyon: Editions Wording. ISBN 978-2-917659-08-3.
- Valode, Philippe (2010). Mayors of Lyon since September 1900 - History and Stories. Lyons editions of Art and History.
