= IAE Poitiers =

Coordinates: 46.589°N 0.345°E

- Type: Public University
- Established: 1956
- President: Jérôme Méric
- Academic staff: 45 permanent teachers & 200 outside contributors
- Students: 2,700
- Location: Poitiers-Niort-Angoulême, France
- Affiliations: University of Poitiers, IAE's Network
- Website: http://www.iae.univ-poitiers.fr

The Institut d'Administration des Entreprises de Poitiers (IAE), in Poitiers, is the Business School of the University of Poitiers. It has been part of the "Réseau des IAE" French network in management education, which includes 32 IAE all over France.

== History ==
The Institut d'Administration des Entreprises de Poitiers was established in 1956. It is attached to the University of Poitiers. It offers more than 20 nationally and internationally recognized courses, either alone or in association with organizations like ESSEC or ESCE in Paris, ESC in La Rochelle, and France.

== International ==
The IAE of Poitiers has built an international network of 50 foreign universities in 25 countries to study abroad through the ERASMUS university exchange program. IAE became involved from the early 1990s in Open and Distance Learning, first in partnership with the CNED then in association with foreign partners. In this context, it has built up ties with Benin, China, Egypt, Ethiopia, Mauritius, Lebanon, Morocco, and Senegal.

== Education Program ==
The IAE manages three sites over the Poitou-Charentes (Poitiers, Niort and Angoulême), and also operates in Paris and overseas.

=== Bachelor’s Degrees ===
- B.sc in Management
  - Courses available in Poitiers, Niort and Angoulême, with variations corresponding to each site's special Master's subjects.
  - This B.sc also exists in Open and Distance Education, for independent students or in association with several foreign Higher Education Institutions.
  - B.sc in Accounting Control and Audit (CCA, in Poitiers),
- Vocational degree in Commerce and Distribution (Poitiers, in association with the Maison de la Formation),
  - Special subjects : Counter Manager or Sales / Sales Executive

=== Master’s degrees ===
- Finance and Accounting Division
  - Master's in Accounting Control and Audit (CCA Poitiers),
  - Master's in Finance and Financial Engineering (Poitiers),
  - Master's degree in Management Control and Organizational Audit (formerly Information and Control Systems, Poitiers, apprenticeship in the second year of the course),
  - Master's in Tax Management (Poitiers, apprenticeship in the second year of the course),
  - Master's in Management and Audit in the Public Sector (Poitiers),
- Management Division
  - Master's in Human Resources Management (Poitiers, apprenticeship in the second year of the course),
    - Also available in Continuing Education, in Poitiers.
    - Also available in Open and Distance Education.
  - Master's in International Management (Poitiers),
    - Also available in Open and Distance Education.
  - Master's in Business Administration (MAE, Poitiers)
    - Also available in Continuing Education, in Poitiers.
    - Also available in Open and Distance Education.
    - In a partnership with the ENSIP, students in their third year can pass this diploma.
  - Master's in Sustainable Management (Poitiers, in partnership with ESC La Rochelle),
  - Master's in Property Management, in partnership with ESSEC,
  - Master's in Management and Administration of the Educational System Institutions (GAESE, Poitiers, in collaboration with ESEN).
- Strategy Marketing Division
  - Master's in International Trade (Poitiers),
    - Also available in Initial Education in Segonzac (Charente), special subject in Wines and Spirits,
    - Also available in Continuing Education in Paris, in partnership with ESCE,
    - Also available in Open and Distance Education.
  - Master's in Marketing and Strategy (Poitiers),
    - Also available in Paris, in partnership with ESCE
    - Also available in Continuing Education in Poitiers.
  - Master's in Marketing Products Management (Niort, apprenticeship in the second year of the course),
  - Master's in Management of Child Products (Angoulême, CEPE),
  - Master's in Packaging Design Management (Angoulême, CEPE).

Some of these Master's can be converted to a Research Master's in the second year of the course, with the aim of preparing for a doctorate.

== Research ==
Researchers and doctorate students from IAE and other faculties or institutions are involved in the CEREGE (Research Center in Management). They are divided into several thematic research teams. Some of them work in close collaboration with companies from the private sector (BNP Paribas...) others with Ministries or with the Revenue Court. The Centre Européen des Produits de l'Enfant (CEPE), in Angoulême, is another research team affiliated to the IAE, specialized in Marketing. The IAE of Poitiers regularly organizes academic Congresses, either national or international. Since 2005:

- in 2005, the CIGAR 10th Congress;
- in 2006, the Annual Congress of the AFFI;
- in 2007, the Annual Congress of the AFC;
- in 2012, the 21st Annual Congress of the IAEs.
- in 2017, the 38th Annual Congress of the AFC.
- Scheduled for May 2020 Atlas AFMI International Conference.
