= Michel Cuypers =

Belgian scholar of Qurānic studies and friar

Michel Cuypers (born 1941) is a Belgian scholar of Qurānic studies, a friar, and a member of the Fraternity of the Little Brothers of Jesus. He is a research fellow at the Dominican Institute for Oriental Studies in Cairo.

== Biography ==
Born in Belgium in 1941, Michel Cuypers spent twelve years in Iran. There, he earned a PhD in Persian literature from the University of Tehran in 1982 and was employed at the University Press of Iran. He also helped establish Luqmān, a journal dedicated to Iranology. After leaving Iran in 1986, Cuypers studied Arabic and, in 1991, became a researcher at the Dominican Institute for Oriental Studies in Cairo.

== Works ==
- A Qur'anic Apocalypse: A Reading of the Thirty-Three Last Sūrahs of the Qur'an (2018)
- The Composition of the Qur'an: Rhetorical Analysis (2015)
- The Banquet: A Reading of the Fifth Sura of the Qur'an (2009)
