= Jean Moulin University Lyon 3 =

Public university in France

Coordinates: 45°44′53″N 4°51′38″E

- Université Jean Moulin Lyon III
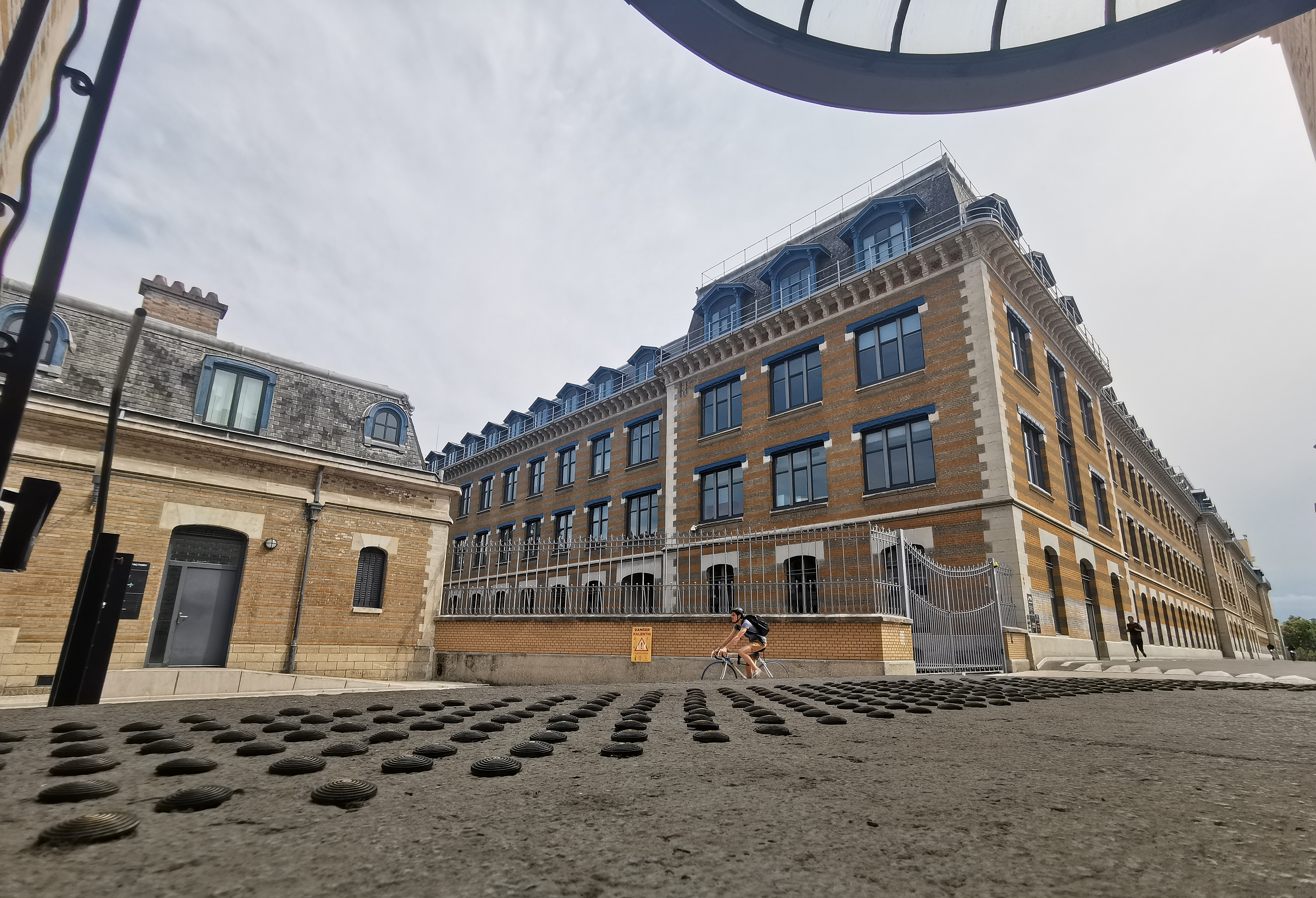
- Manufacture des tabacs campus
- Motto: Ad summum in omnibus pro omnibus^{1} (Latin)
- Type: Public
- Established: 1973 – following the division of the University of Lyon
- Affiliations: University of Lyon; European University Association; Coimbra Group; Couperin consortium
- Budget: €114 million
- President: Gilles Bonnet
- Students: 27,000
- Doctoral students: 650
- Location: Lyon, France
- Website: www.univ-lyon3.fr
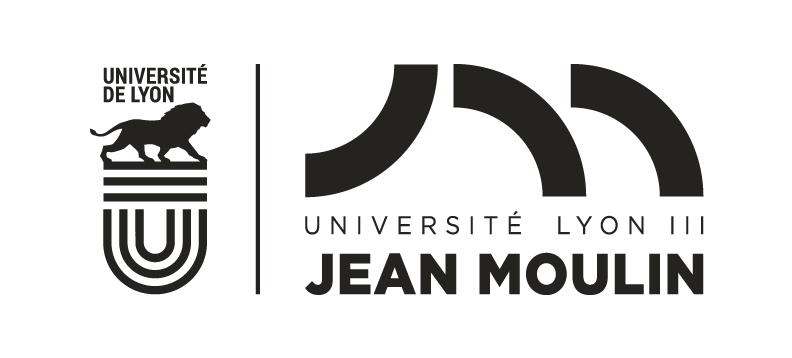

The Jean Moulin University Lyon 3 (French: Université Jean Moulin Lyon 3), also referred to as Lyon 3, is one of the three public universities of Lyon, France. It is named after the French Resistance fighter Jean Moulin and specialises in Law, Politics, Philosophy, Management, and Languages.

The university is under the purview of the Academy of Lyon. A total of 27,000 students study there for undergraduate and postgraduate degrees. It is a member of the regional university system ComUE Lyon Saint-Etienne, the Coimbra Group and the European University Association (EUA).

== History ==
University Lyon 3 was established in the early 1970s (26 July 1973), part of the reorganisation of higher education following the events of May 68 that rocked the academic world. In 1969, the old university of Lyon was first split into a university dedicated to medicine and natural sciences (Claude Bernard University Lyon 1) and another one regrouping all other faculties, which was soon separated between what became Lumière University Lyon 2, a university for social sciences and arts, primarily located in a suburban campus, and Jean Moulin University Lyon 3, a downtown university centered around the faculties of law and philosophy and the school of management. The new university was named after Jean Moulin, a wartime resistance leader who was captured in Lyon. It is one of the largest institutions within the University of Lyon attracting over 27,000 students, including over 4,000 international students. It specialises in the humanities and social sciences.

== Campuses ==
The university is located on three different campuses: the first one, called "Les Quais", is by the Rhône (river), the second, called "Manufacture des Tabacs" in the south part of Lyon, and the last one in Bourg-en-Bresse, about 70 km north of the city.

== Faculties ==
The university is organised into four main faculties, a management school, and a University Institute of Technology. The campus at Bourg-en-Bresse offers the full range of courses.

=== Faculty of Law ===
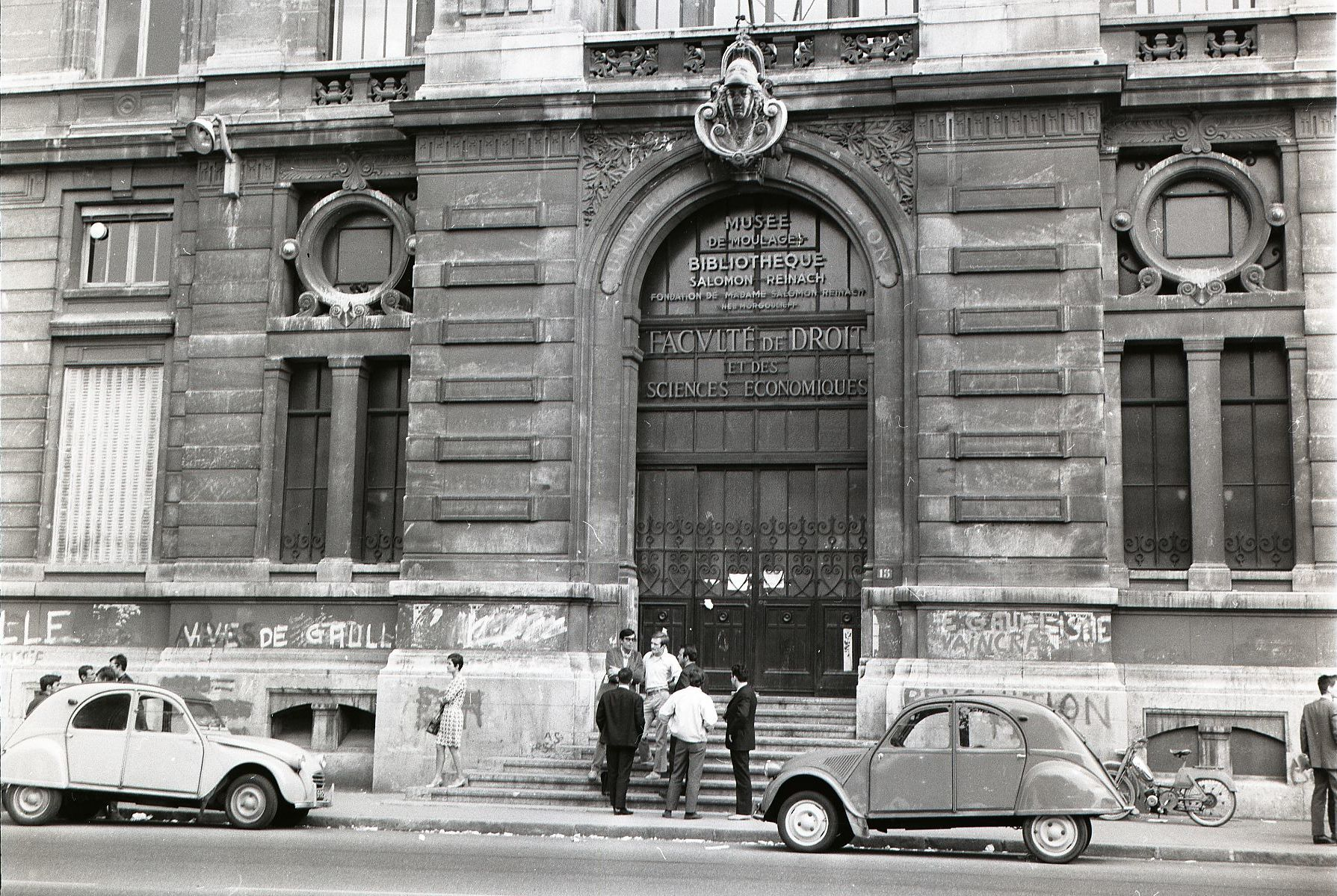
University of Lyon Law School, 1968

The Faculty of Law in Lyon was created by decree issued on 29 October 1875, by then-President Mac Mahon, was inaugurated by French President Felix Faure on 1 May 1896. Since then, the Faculty of Law of Lyon has been the largest centre for law students from the city of Lyon. It offers all the legal training of the first year Degree tray until 8 (or more). Lyon's faculty of Law enjoys a national and international reputation of distinction. In the Gourman Report (6th ed, 1993), it was ranked 1st among France's provincial universities, and 5th among European universities, behind Paris, Oxford, Cambridge and Heidelberg.

The Law Facultyhas always been in touch with foreign legal systems. Before the First World War, the Lyon Faculty founded the Law school of Beirut, in Lebanon, paving the way to the creation of today's Saint Joseph University, Beyrouth. These two cities, Lyon and Beirut, were both on one of Silk Roads, which started in China and ended in Lyon; intellectual, artistic and industrial interests converged.

The first French Institute of Comparative Law was created in Lyon by Édouard Lambert in 1920, and now bears his name. In 1949 he assisted the jurist Abd El-Razzak El-Sanhuri in writing the Egyptian Civil Code, which would form the foundation of Egyptian civil law. Cambodia was also the theater of the development of the Lyon Law School, before the Vietnam War. Quite frequently, the Dean of the Lyon Law School had previously been or was to become a Dean in Beirut or Phnom Penh.

The law school is known for research of history of law and family law. It is also famous in the field of Business Law, thanks to its master's degree in Business and Tax law, coupled with the most famous degree in the field of business Law in France: DJCE (DJCE stands for "Diplôme de Juriste Conseil en Entreprise" or Corporate Jurist Diploma in English).

The Law faculty also includes the department of political science, with a strong focus on international relations (international security, diplomacy, francophone studies). Its M.A. in international relations was ranked 5th among the best master's degrees in international security and defense by SMBG ranking 2015 and became the basis of an Erasmus Mundus Joint Degree in 2025.

In 2008, it launched its own LL.M in International and European Law. The law school offers several joint programs in business law with EM Lyon business school, in criminal science with the faculty of medicine of university of Lyon, in security studies with France's National Police College.

The faculty organise conferences with INTERPOL, France's National Police College (ENSP) and Handicap International on a regular basis.

In 2021/22 there were almost 11,000 students registered in the Faculty of Law accounting for over 40% of students at the university.

=== Faculty of Philosophy ===
The Faculty of Philosophy offers specialist courses in Ethics, Health philosophy, History of philosophy, Culture & health, Aesthetics, Logic, Political and legal philosophy. The professorial staff of the Faculty of Philosophy of Lyon 3 included Régis Debray and includes Mauro Carbone, Jean-Jacques Wunenburger, Jean-Claude Beaune, Jean-Pierre Ginisti, François Guéry, Bruno Pinchard, Bimbenet Etienne, Jean-Joël Duhot. In 2021, it had over 850 students, including 60 doctoral students.

=== Faculty of Humanities, Letters and Societies ===
The Faculty of Humanities, Letters and Societies (formerly faculty of Letters and Civilisations) complements and collaborates with the University Lyon 2 and the ENS de Lyon. The faculty is organised into five departments: Ancient Languages and Literatures, Modern Literature, History, Geography-Planning, and Information-Communication. In 2021/22, there was almost 100 faculty and over 2,700 students registered.

=== Faculty of Languages ===
The Faculty of Languages provides instruction in two broad areas: Applied Foreign Languages (LEA) and Languages, Letters and Foreign and Regional Civilisations (LLCER). The foreign languages taught include German, English, Spanish, Arabic, Chinese, Russian, Polish, Portuguese, Greek, Hebrew, Italian, Japanese, Korean, Sanskrit and Hindi. In 2024, there were approximately 5,000 students registered in the Faculty of Languages.

=== iaelyon School of Management ===
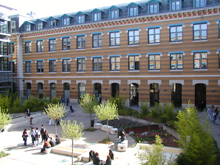
IAE, Institut d'Administration des Entreprises

The iaelyon School of Management is located in the historical complex of the "Manufacture des Tabacs" in the heart of Lyon. Founded in 1956, it has 7,000 students in 2024 (including 2000 in postgraduate studies), accounting for more almost 30% of the total student population at Lyon 3 University. In addition to the 150 some professors at the IAE, 400 executives from private, external companies contribute to the education.

The various courses offered include four bachelor's degrees (Licence), eight professional bachelor's degrees (Licence professionnelles), nine master's degrees (with 40 specializations) and preparatory courses for the chartered accountants examination.

The IAE of Lyon is one of the top French institutions for research and training in management. The school is highly internationalized with partnerships with over 150 universities in more than 50 countries.

=== Institute of Technology ===
The IUT offers a range of short courses and professional programmes in technology.

== Notable faculty ==
=== Prior to division of University of Lyon ===
- Maurice Merleau-Ponty (1908–1961), philosopher.
- Henri Maldiney (1912-2013), philosopher.
- Gilles Deleuze (1925–1995), philosopher. Taught at the School of Philosophy from 1965 to 1969.

=== After division of University of Lyon ===
- Guy Achard (born 1936), Roman historian
- Mauro Carbone (born 1956), philosopher
- Denis Crouzet (born 1953), historian
- Michel Durafour (1920-2017), economist; centrist politician
- Régis Debray (born 1940), philosopher; intellectual, journalist, left-wing government official.
- Tristan Garcia (born 1981), philosopher and novelist
- Geneviève Gobillot, scholar of Islam
- Bruno Gollnisch (born 1950), professor of Japanese language and civilisation; far-right politician
- Serge Guinchard (born 1946), jurist, later professor emeritus at Université Panthéon-Assas.
- Gilles Guyot (born 1946), professor of management
- Jean Haudry (1934-2023), professor of Sanskrit; far-right politician
- Hubert Julien-Laferrière (born 1966), economist; center-left politician
- Blandine Kriegel (born 1943), professor of philosophy
- Bernard Lugan (born 1946), professor of African history; far-right politician
- Jean-François Mayer (born 1957), religious historian
- Michel Mercier (born 1947), center-right politician, former minister of Justice (2010 until 2012)
- Pierre-Jean Souriac, historian
- László Trócsányi (born 1956), Hungarian lawyer and politician
- Jean Varenne (1926–1997), Indologist; far-right politician
- Pierre Vial (born 1942), medievalist; far-right politician
- Gérard E. Weil (1926–1986), biblical scholar
- Shawn Wong (born 1949) – American professor of creative writing

== Notable alumni ==
=== Prior to division of University of Lyon ===
- Georges Chapouthier (born 1945), neuroscientist and philosopher.
- Anne-Marie Escoffier (born 1942), socialist politician
- Frantz Fanon (1925–1961), psychiatrist, philosopher, revolutionary and writer whose work is influential in the field of post-colonial studies.
- Antoine Ghanem (1943–2007), Lebanese politician and an MP in the Lebanese Parliament.
- Serge Guinchard (born 1946), jurist, professor emeritus at Université Panthéon-Assas.
- Motono Ichirō (1862–1918), statesman and diplomat, former foreign minister of Japan
- Louis Josserand (1868–1941), legal scholar, council at Court of Cassation
- Ume Kenjirō (1860–1910), drafter of the Japanese civil code, and a founder of Hosei University
- Dominique Perben (born 1945), former minister of Justice (2002–2005), and minister of transportation (2005–2007).
- François Perroux (1903–1987), economist, professor at the Collège de France

=== After division of University of Lyon ===
- Reine Alapini-Gansou (born 1956), judge on the International Court of Justice.
- Étienne Blanc (born 1954), conservative politician (LR)
- Frigide Barjot (born 1962), humorist, and conservative political activist
- Farès Boueiz (born 1955), Lebanese lawyer and politician
- Frank Bournois (born 1962), business academic
- Thierry Braillard (born 1964), center-left politician and former minister of Sports.
- Dominique Dord (born 1959), conservative politician, member of the National Assembly of France.
- Coralie Dubost (born 1983), lawyer, center politician (La République En Marche!)
- Audrey Dufeu-Schubert (born 1980), center politician (La République En Marche!)
- Georges Fenech (born 1954), judge and conservative politician (UMP)
- Kadra Ahmed Hassan (born 1973), permanent representative of Djibouti to the United Nations at Geneva
- Michel Havard (born 1967), conservative politician (UMP)
- Anne Hidalgo (born 1959), Mayor of Paris (2014-2026), member of the Socialist Party
- Seyed Mohammad Hosseini (born 1963), Iraqi diplomat.
- Andrew Hussey (born 1963), historian of French culture
- Alain Jakubowicz (born 1953), lawyer, human rights activist and politician, former president of the International League Against Racism and Anti-Semitism
- Dalia Kreivienė (born 1972), Lithuanian diplomat
- Patrick Louis (born 1955), far-right politician and member of the European Parliament
- Gwei Lun-mei (born 1983), Taiwanese actress.
- Jean-François Mayer (born 1957), historian of religion
- Michel Mercier (born 1947), center-right former minister of Justice (2010 until 2012)
- Yves Nicolin (born 1963), conservative politician (UMP)
- Jacqueline Oble (born 1950), Ivorian lawyer and politician
- Meg Otanwa, Nigerian actress
- Walid Phares (born 1957), Donald Trump's foreign policy adviser, Lebanese-American scholar and analyst for MSNBC, professor at National War College (NWC)
- Julien Rochedy (born 1988), French far-right politician
- Sylvie Tellier (born 1978), Miss France 2002, lawyer, national director of both Miss France and Miss Europe Organization
- Yacouba Isaac Zida (born 1965), former Prime Minister of Burkina Faso.

== Students ==
As of 2005, the biggest school in terms of number of students were the Faculty of Law (10,460) and the Business School (IAE) with (8,578). Then came the Faculty of Languages (4851) and the Faculty of Humanities and Arts (13%). Other students attend the Faculty of Philosophy, or programmes such as professional short-term degree.

== See also ==
- List of public universities in France by academy
