= Institut d'Administration des Entreprises =

Graduate schools of management in France

IAE - University Schools of Management
- Institut d'Administration des entreprises
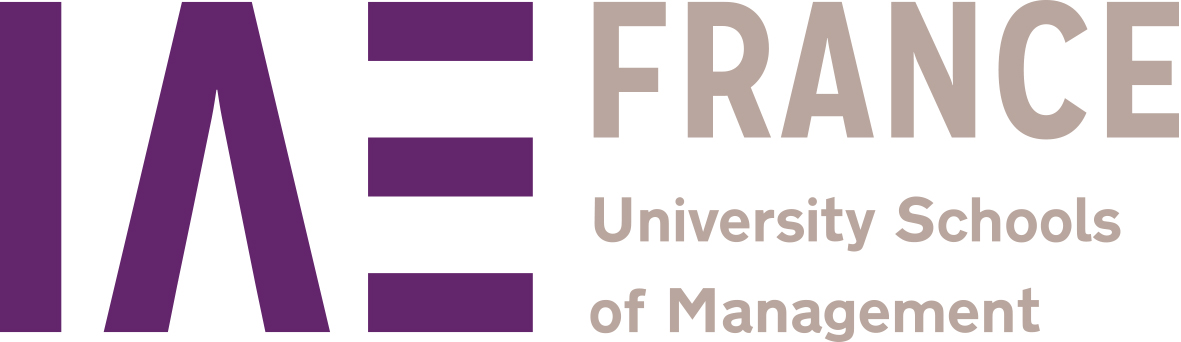
- Type: University Schools of Management
- Established: 1955
- Accreditation: Ministry of Economy and Finance (France) Qualicert
- Affiliations: 36 universities
- Academic staff: 1,200 teacher-researchers
- Students: 45,000
- Location: France
- Language: English-only & French-only programs
- Founder: Gaston Berger France
- Website: http://www.iae-france.fr/en/

The French IAE (abbreviation for Institut d'Administration des Entreprises; French pronunciation: [ɛ̃stity dadministʁasjɔ̃ dez‿ɑ̃tʁəpʁiz]) are part of the French universities, except for the IAE of Paris which has a special status. They are academically selective, socially inclusive and very affordable Graduate Schools of Management within the French Public Research Universities. The IAE model is inspired by American Business Schools.

In 2019, there are 37 IAEs spread across French territory, 36 of which are grouped through IAE FRANCE (previously called National Association of IAEs, then IAE Network), chaired by Professor Éric Lamarque, director of the IAE of Paris. This is the primary French network of education in management which has around 45,000 students and 425,000 alumni.

== IAE's History ==
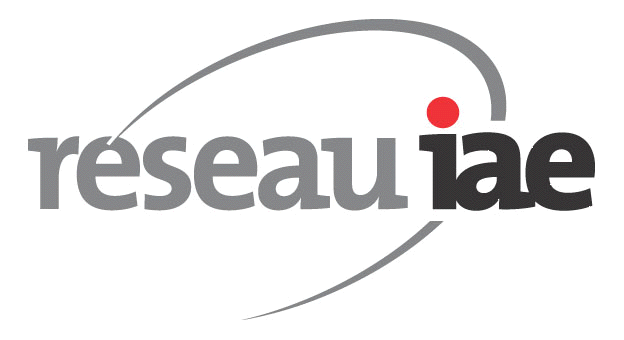
Old IAE logo

The origin of IAE dates back to the 1950s. At the time, degrees in management were not available in French universities. In the United States, by contrast, economic growth is powered by batches of engineers and managers from the best business schools attached to universities. In the midst of reconstruction, France have a lack of managers while the Thirty Glorious begin.

In 1955, Gaston Berger, Director of Higher Education, Ministry of Education, created the Institute of Business Administration (IAE) in American style, to provide academic knowledge in management that complements the professional know-how and gather University and Business world. In the beginning, IAE were schools with a single diploma, “CAAE” - Certificate in Business Administration with a pioneering position on the "dual skills". This degree was designed to give management skills to engineers and graduate students of the faculties of Law, Letters and Sciences. Recognized degree, designed to be followed on a year, during the evening, is an “MBA à la française”. The teaching is based on the case method, innovative approach at the time. It has been for nearly 20 years, the common degree of most IAE in becoming “DESS CAAE” and continues today through the “MAE” (Master of Business Administration).

== Academics ==
The IAE network supports education in business administration and management at more than 30 business schools within public universities in France. Students may enroll in most IAE member Bachelors programs directly after a obtaining a Baccalauréat, or the equivalent high school diploma for international students, or in a Masters programs directly. Unlike the French Grandes écoles, public university education is open admissions, tuition is often more affordable, and registration does not require attendance at a Classe préparatoire aux grandes écoles or prépa (post-high school preparatory school). Some IAE degree programs require that applicants take an exam called the IAE Message Test (SIM) prior to admittance, but not all programs require this or any test score, although some programs are taught in English and may require additional test scores in English as a second language. The SIM exam covers these areas: general knowledge; economic and managerial culture; comprehension and written expression in French; logical and numerical reasoning; comprehension and written expression in English.

Many IAE business schools offers Bachelor, Master, and Doctoral programmes in many academic, business administration and management subjects. Higher education degrees in France are organized into three levels thus facilitating international mobility: the Licence / Bachelor's, Master's, and Doctorate degrees. A Bachelor's degree requires the completion of 180 ECTS credits; a Master's, requires an additional 120 ECTS credits. Degrees from French public universities are recognized world-wide and awarded by the Ministry of National Education (France) (French: Le Ministère de L'éducation Nationale). In 2022, annual tuition for many IAE Bachelors degree programs taught in English-only was €262, for students from anywhere in the world.

== Partnerships ==
IAE management schools have more than 1,400 university exchange partnerships in over 50 countries. Additionally, all IAE students may participate in university students exchanges in China and in Canada.

- Sichuan International Studies University (SISU), Chongqing, China - Since 2016, IAE and SISU students have been able to take Master level programs in the English and French programs at both schools.
- McGill University, Montreal, Canada - Since 2017, IAE students are able to transfer to McGill for one or two semesters.

== IAE Business Schools ==
Most members of the IAE network have the status of: institutes and schools belonging to universities. Within a university, some are schools, and others are part of a larger faculty, such as the faculty of economics and management. The IAE Paris is the only independent IAE, but it too is linked to Pantheon-Sorbonne University as a public establishment of an administrative nature. EM Strasbourg Business School is also different in that it is a Grande école, the result of the merger in 2008 between the public IAE Strasbourg (est.1956) and the Grande école IECS of Strasbourg (est.1919), within the University of Strasbourg.

| Name | University linked to | official website | Accreditation(s) |
|---|---|---|---|
| IAE Aix-en-Provence | Aix-Marseille University | iae-aix.com | Qualicert EQUIS, AMBA |
| IAE Amiens | Université de Picardie | u-picardie.fr | Qualicert |
| IAE Besançon | Université de Franche-Comté | iae.univ-fcomte.fr | Qualicert |
| IAE Bordeaux | Université de Bordeaux | iae-bordeaux.fr | Qualicert |
| IAE Brest | Université de Bretagne occidentale | univ-brest.fr/iae | Qualicert |
| IAE Caen | Université de Caen Basse-Normandie | iae.unicaen.fr | Qualicert |
| EUM Clermont | Université d'Auvergne | management.u-clermont1.fr | Qualicert |
| IAE Corse | University of Corsica Pascal Paoli | iae.univ-corse.fr | Qualicert |
| IAE Dijon | Université de Bourgogne | iae.u-bourgogne.fr | Qualicert |
| IAE Grenoble | Pierre Mendès-France University | iae-grenoble.fr | Qualicert |
| IAE Paris-Est | UPEC-UPEM | | Qualicert |
| IAE Réunion | Université de la Réunion | iae-reunion.fr | Qualicert |
| IAE Limoges | Université de Limoges | iae.unilim.fr | Qualicert |
| IAE Lille | University of Lille | iae.univ-lille1.fr | Qualicert |
| IAE Lyon | Jean Moulin University Lyon 3 | iae.univ-lyon3.fr | Qualicert EPAS |
| IAE Metz | Université Paul-Verlaine | esm.univ-metz.fr | Qualicert |
| IAE Montpellier | Université Montpellier 2 | iae.univ-montp2.fr/en | Qualicert EPAS |
| IAE Nancy | Université Nancy-II | isam-iae.univ-nancy2.fr | Qualicert |
| IAE Nantes | Université de Nantes | iemniae.univ-nantes.fr | Qualicert |
| IAE Nice | Université de Nice Sophia-Antipolis | iae-nice.fr | Qualicert |
| IAE Orléans | Université d'Orléans | univ-orleans.fr | Qualicert |
| IAE Paris | Université Paris 1 Panthéon-Sorbonne | iae-paris.com | Qualicert |
| IAE Pau | Université de Pau et des Pays de l'Adour | iae.univ-pau.fr | Qualicert |
| IAE Perpignan | Université de Perpignan | univ-perp.fr | Qualicert |
| IAE Poitiers | Université de Poitiers | iae.univ-poitiers.fr | Qualicert |
| IAE Rennes | Université de Rennes I | igr.univ-rennes1.fr | Qualicert |
| IAE Rouen | Université de Rouen | iae.univ-rouen.fr | Qualicert |
| IAE Savoie Mont-Blanc | Université de Savoie | iae.univ-smb.fr | Qualicert, EPAS |
| IAE Saint-Étienne | Université de Saint-Étienne | iseag-iae.univ-st-etienne.fr | Qualicert |
| EM Strasbourg | Université de Strasbourg | em-strasbourg.eu | Qualicert, EPAS, AACSB |
| IAE Toulon | Université de Toulon | univ-tln.fr | Qualicert |
| IAE Toulouse | Université Toulouse I | iae-toulouse.fr | Qualicert, EPAS for doctoral purposes |
| IAE Tours | Université François Rabelais | iae.univ-tours.fr | Qualicert |
| IAE Valenciennes | Université de Valenciennes | univ-valenciennes.fr/IAE | Qualicert |
| IAE Versailles | Versailles Saint-Quentin-en-Yvelines University | ism.uvsq.fr | Qualicert |

== Alumni ==
- Guillaume Faury : CEO of Airbus and Former CEO of Eurocopter
- Bérangère Couillard : Politician
- Pierre-Andre Terisse : Former COO/CFO of Coty Inc.
- Amandine Petit : Miss France 2021
- Sylvain Waserman : Politician
- Quentin Beriot : Directeur General Unéo
- Jean-Marc Zulesi : Politician
- Marie-Arlette Carlotti : Politician
- Omar Cissé: Senegalese, CEO of InTouch group.
