= Gaston Berger =

French philosopher (1896–1960)

Gaston Berger (French: [ɡastɔ̃ bɛʁʒe]; 1 October 1896 – 13 November 1960) was a French futurist but also an industrialist, a philosopher and a state manager. He is mainly known for his remarkably lucid analysis of Edmund Husserl's phenomenology and for his studies on the character structure.

== Life and career ==
Berger was born in Saint-Louis, French West Africa (now Senegal). He received his primary and part of his secondary education in Perpignan, France, and had to take up a position in an industrial firm. After having performed his military duties in World War I, he became an associate of the owner of the firm.

Berger decided to continue his studies. He worked with Rene Le Senne and passed his baccalaureat. He then enrolled in the University of Aix-en-Provence, where he studied philosophy under Maurice Blondel. Having passed his license exam, he obtained his Master of Arts with a thesis on the "Relations between the conditions of intelligibility on the one hand and the problem of contingency on the other hand." In 1926, Berger founded in Marseille, together with some friends, the Société des études philosophiques du Sud-Est and its periodical Les Études philosophiques. In 1938, he organized the first Congress of French-Language Philosophical Societies. In 1941, he submitted his two PhD theses, the first entitled "Investigations on the conditions of knowledge: Essay on pure theoretics", and the second "The 'Cogito' in Husserl's philosophy."

Berger then left his industrial firm and became first a Lecturer, then a Maitre de conferences for philosophy at the University of Aix-en Provence. In 1944, he became a full professor. In 1949, he became secretary general of the Fulbright Commission, in charge of the cultural relations between France and the United States.

After managing a fertilizer plant during the 1930s, he created in Paris the Centre Universitaire International et des Centres de Prospective and directed the philosophical studies department. The term prospective, invented by Gaston Berger, is the study of the possible futures.

From 1953 to 1960, he was in charge of tertiary education at the Minister of National Education and modernised the French universities system. He was elected to the Académie des Sciences Morales et Politiques in 1955.

In 1957 he founded the journal Prospective and the homonym centre with André Gros. This same year he created the Institut national des sciences appliquées (INSA) of Lyon with the rector Jean Capelle.

== Personal life and legacy ==
He was the father of the French choreographer Maurice Béjart (1927–2007), a stage name for Maurice-Jean Berger.

The University of Saint-Louis, Senegal, where he was born, is named after him.

== Major works ==
- Recherches sur les conditions de la connaissance, Paris, PUF, 1941
- Le Cogito dans la philosophie de Husserl, Paris, Aubier, 1941
- Traité pratique d’analyse du caractère, Paris, PUF, 1950
- Questionnaire caractérologique, PUF, Paris, 1950
- Caractère et personnalité, Paris, PUF, 1954
