= LGBTQ rights in the 18th century =

This is a list of important events relating to the LGBT community from 1701 to 1800.

== Events ==
=== 1700s ===
==== 1704 ====
- 12 December – The Province of New York adopted a statute issuing a general pardon for almost all pending prosecutions, including those for same-sex intercourse. They were abandoned as of that date.

=== 1710s ===
==== 1714 ====
- 12 December – The Province of South Carolina adopts English common law and criminalizes buggery, punishing same-sex intercourse and zoophilia with the death penalty and forfeiture of property for males only.

==== 1715 ====
- Between 17 November and 19 January – The Province of North Carolina adopts English common law, thus criminalizing anal sex and bestiality with the death penalty.

==== 1718 ====
- 31 May – The Province of Pennsylvania adopts English common law, thus criminalizing anal sex and bestiality with the death penalty.
- 14 May – The Province of New Hampshire reword their sodomy statute.

==== 1719 ====
- The Delaware Colony adopts English common law, thus punishing anal intercourse and bestiality with the death penalty.

=== 1720s ===
==== 1729 ====
- The Colony of Rhode Island and Providence Plantations adopted a statute that reworded the sodomy law.

=== 1730s ===
==== 1730 ====
- 8 July – The Province of New Jersey adopted a statute imposing a duty on those bringing into the colony people convicted of various crimes, including sodomites.

=== 1740s ===
==== 1746 ====
- 18 August – Frederick the Great of the Kingdom of Prussia suspended the death penalty for sodomy, recommending "Festungarbeit" (military labor) as an alternative punishment, as well as a visit from a preacher, to "make them understand the greatness and abomination of the vice they have committed". (Frederick was himself both gay and agnostic.)

=== 1770s ===
==== 1776 ====
- The State of Connecticut retained all existing laws in force.
- 2 July – The New Jersey Constitution retained all existing laws in force.
- 14 October – The State of Maryland enacts English common law, thus criminalizing anal sex and zoophilia.

==== 1779 ====
- 11 February – The Vermont Republic adopted a statute that enacted English common law as it is practiced throughout New England.

=== 1780s ===
==== 1782 ====
- June – The Vermont Republic adopted a statute that enacted only English common law, but also all statutes passed by English Parliament before 1 October 1760, thus criminalizing anal sex and bestiality in the Vermont Republic.

==== 1785 ====
- 20 December – The Commonwealth of Pennsylvania executes Joseph Ross for sodomy. This is the last person in the United States of America to be executed for sodomy.

==== 1789 ====
- 18 August – The Republic of Liège is created from the Prince-Bishopric of Liège.

=== 1790s ===
==== 1790 ====
- January – The United Belgian States was created out of the Austrian Netherlands.
- 8 February – The State of New Hampshire enacted a statute that changed the language of the law to read that "if any Man shall carnally lie with a Man as Man carnally lieth with a Woman." Thus it was made clear that only sodomy between two men was a crime.
- December – The Austrian Netherlands annexes the United Belgian States.

==== 1791 ====
- 12 January – The Republic of Liège is abolished and the Prince-Bishopric of Liège is restored.
- 25 September and 6 October – The Kingdom of France adopts the Penal Code of 1791, legalizing same-sex sexual intercourse and zoophilia, becoming the first country to do so.

==== 1792 ====
- The French Republic annexes the Duchy of Savoy (Kingdom of Sardinia), thus extending the Penal Code of 1791 to the territory.
- The French Republic annexes the Imperial Town of Speyer, thus extending the Penal Code of 1791 to the territory.
- The French Republic annexes the Imperial City of Worms, thus extending the Penal Code of 1791 to the territory.
- The Erie Triangle is sold to the Commonwealth of Pennsylvania, thus criminalizing same-sex intercourse with a maximum penalty of forfeiture of estate and a maximum of 10 years in prison.
- 5 August – In the First Partition of Poland, the Kingdom of Prussia and Habsburg Empire annex parts of the Polish–Lithuanian Commonwealth, thus criminalizing same-sex intercourse in those annexed territories.
- 10 December – The Commonwealth of Virginia criminalizes buggery, including criminalizing female same-sex intercourse, with the death penalty.
- 17 December – The Rauracian Republic is created from the Prince-Bishopric of Basel.

==== 1793 ====
- The French Republic annexes Riquewihr and the County of Horbourg (part of the Duchy of Württemberg), thus extending the Penal Code of 1791 to the territory.
- The French Republic annexes the County of Nice (part of the Kingdom of Sardinia), thus extending the Penal Code of 1791 to the territory.
- 19 January – The French Republic occupies the Principality of Monaco.
- 23 January – In the Second Partition of Poland, the Kingdom of Prussia and Habsburg Empire annex parts of the Polish–Lithuanian Commonwealth, thus criminalizing same-sex intercourse in those annexed territories.
- 24 February – The French Republic annexes the Principality of Monaco, thus extending the Penal Code of 1791 to the territory.
- 3 March – The French Republic annexes the Principality of Salm-Salm, thus extending the Penal Code of 1791 to the territory.
- 18 March – The Republic of Mainz is created out of the Electorate of Mainz.
- 23 March – The French Republic annexes the Rauracian Republic, thus extending the Penal Code of 1791 to the territory.
- 15 April – The French Republic loses control of Tobago.
- 18 May – The Republic of the Seven United Netherlands occupies Saint Martin.
- 22 July – The Electorate of Mainz annexes the Republic of Mainz.
- November – The French Republic annexes the County of Montbéliard, thus extending the Penal Code of 1791 to the territory.

==== 1794 ====
- The French Republic annexes the Austrian Netherlands, thus extending the Penal Code of 1791 to the territory.
- The French Republic annexes the Free Imperial City of Aachen, thus extending the Penal Code of 1791 to the territory.
- The French Republic annexes the Free Imperial City of Cologne, thus extending the Penal Code of 1791 to the territory.
- The French Republic annexes the Duchy of Jülich, thus extending the Penal Code of 1791 to the territory.
- The French Republic annexes the Electorate of Cologne on the Left bank of the Rhine, thus extending the Penal Code of 1791 to the territory.
- The French Republic annexes the Electorate of Trier on the Left bank of the Rhine, thus extending the Penal Code of 1791 to the territory.
- The French Republic annexes Maastricht and other enclaves inside the Holy Roman Empire (part of the Dutch Republic), thus extending the Penal Code of 1791 to the territory.
- Great Britain occupies Chandernagore.
- The Kingdom of Prussia officially reduces the punishment for sodomy from death by burning to imprisonment for a year or more, whipping, and banishment. The death penalty for sodomy had previously been suspended by royal decree in 1746.
- 30 March – Great Britain occupies Martinique and reinstates the Ancien Régime there.
- 5 April – The Republic of the Seven United Netherlands occupation of the Saint Martin ends and the Great Britain occupation of the Saint Martin begins.
- 21 April – Great Britain occupies Guadeloupe.
- 24 April – The Republic of Bouillon is created from the Duke of Bouillon.
- 17 June – The Anglo-Corsican Kingdom is established, thus extending the Buggery Act 1533 to the territory, enacting the death penalty for anal intercourse and zoophilia.

==== 1795 ====
- The French Republic annexes counties of Créhange and Dabo, thus extending the Penal Code of 1791 to the territory.
- The French Republic annexes the Prince-Bishopric of Liège, thus extending the Penal Code of 1791 to the territory.
- The French Republic annexes the Duchy of Cleves on the Left bank of the Rhine, thus extending the Penal Code of 1791 to the territory.
- The French Republic occupies Sint Eustatius.
- The Cape of Good Hope annexes the Republic Swellendam.
- The Republic Graaff-Reinet is created from the Dutch Cape Colony.
- 26 April – The Republic of Alba is formed from the Kingdom of Sardinia.
- 28 April – The Kingdom of Sardinia annexes the Republic of Alba.
- 29 April – The Great Britain occupation of the Saint Martin ends, Saint Martin restored to French Republic control, and Sint Maarten occupied by the French Republic.
- 14 July – The Territory Northwest of the River Ohio adopts English common law, thus criminalizing anal sex and zoophilia with the death penalty.
- 17 June – The Republic Swellendam is created from the Dutch Cape Colony.
- 22 July – The French Republic annexes the Captaincy General of Santo Domingo into Saint-Domingue, thus extending the Penal Code of 1791 to the territory.
- 24 October – In the Third Partition of Poland, the Kingdom of Prussia and Habsburg Empire annex the Polish–Lithuanian Commonwealth, thus criminalizing same-sex intercourse in those annexed territories.
- 26 October – The French Republic annexes the Republic of Bouillon, thus extending the Code of Offences and Penalties to the territory.

==== 1796 ====
- The Duchy of Modena and Reggio is occupied by French Republic.
- The Cape of Good Hope annexes the Republic Graaff-Reinet.
- Great Britain occupies Saint Lucia.
- 18 March – The State of New Jersey adopted a statute reduced the penalty for same-sex intercourse from death to a fine and a maximum of 21 years of solitary imprisonment with hard labor. This is the first sodomy law in the United States of America to use the term crime against nature.
- June – The Bolognese Republic is formed from the Papal States.
- 3 August – The Treaty of Friendship, Limits, and Navigation Between Spain and the United States was proclaimed. The Kingdom of Spain ceased parts of West Florida to the United States of America, thus legalizing same-sex intercourse to the territory.
- 16 October – The Cispadane Republic annexes Bolognese Republic.
- 19 October – The French Republic annexes the Anglo-Corsican Kingdom, thus extending the Code of Offences and Penalties to the territory and re-legalizing anal intercourse and zoophilia in the territory.
- 5 November – The Vermont Republic adopted a statute that amends the English common-law statute.
- 15 November – The Transpadane Republic is created from the Duchy of Milan.

==== 1797 ====
- The French Republic annexes the County of Nassau-Saarbrücken, thus extending the Code of Offences and Penalties to the territory.
- The French Republic annexes the Palatinate-Birkenfeld-Zweibrücken, thus extending the Code of Offences and Penalties to the territory.
- The French Republic annexes parts of the Landgraviate of Hesse-Darmstadt on the Left bank of the Rhine, thus extending the Code of Offences and Penalties to the territory.
- The French Republic annexes parts of the Landgraviate of Hesse-Kassel on the Left bank of the Rhine, thus extending the Code of Offences and Penalties to the territory.
- The French Republic annexes parts of the County Palatine of the Rhine on the Left bank of the Rhine, thus extending the Code of Offences and Penalties to the territory.
- The French Republic annexes the Ionian Islands (part of the Most Serene Republic of Venice), thus extending the Code of Offences and Penalties to the territory.
- The French Republic annexes the Republic of Ancona (part of the Most Serene Republic of Venice), thus extending the Code of Offences and Penalties to the territory.
- 4 February – The Tiberina Republic is created from the Papal States.
- 13 March – The Republic of Bergamo is created from the Most Serene Republic of Venice.
- 18 March – The Republic of Brescia is created from the Most Serene Republic of Venice.
- 28 March – The Republic of Crema is created from the Most Serene Republic of Venice.
- 19 May – The Transpadane Republic annexes the Duchy of Modena and Reggio.
- 14 June – The Ligurian Republic is created from the Republic of Genoa.
- 28 August – The Cisrhenian Republic is created out of the Electorate of Cologne, the Electorate of Mainz, the Electorate of Trier, the Electorate of the Palatinate, the Duchy of Jülich, the Duchy of Cleves, and the Free City of Aachen.
- 16 October – The Cispadane Republic is created from the Duchy of Modena and Reggio and the Papal Legations (part of the Papal states).
- 22 October The Cisalpine Republic annexes Valtellina (part of the Most Serene Republic of Venice).
- 25 October – The French Republic gains control of Tobago again, thus extending the Code of Offences and Penalties to the territory.
- 17 November – The Anconine Republic is created from the Papal States.

==== 1798 ====
- The French Republic annexes Republic of Geneva, thus extending the Code of Offences and Penalties to the territory.
- The Republic of Connacht was created from the Kingdom of Ireland.
- The Kingdom of Ireland annexes the Republic of Connacht.
- The State of Rhode Island and Providence Plantations adopted a statute that reworded the sodomy law.
- Johann Stavorinus, a Dutchman traveler, wrote that among the Moghuls of Bengal that "sin of Sodom is not only universal in practice among them, but extends to a bestial communication with brutes, and in particular with sheep."
- 24 January – The Lemanic Republic is created out of the Republic of the Swiss.
- 28 January – The Treaty of Mulhouse is signed and the Republic of Mulhouse becomes part of French Republic, thus extending the Code of Offences and Penalties to the territory.
- 10 February – The Commonwealth of Kentucky adopts a statute reducing the penalty for same-sex intercourse from the death penalty to 2–5 years in the jail and penitentiary house.
- 15 February – The Roman Republic is created from the Papal States.
- 12 April – The Helvetic Republic is created out of the Republic of the Swiss and same-sex intercourse is legalized in the nation.
- 11 June – The French Republic occupies Malta.
- 1 July – The French occupation of Eyalet of Egypt begins.

==== 1799 ====
- 21 January – The Parthenopean Republic is created from the Kingdom of Naples.
- 4 February – The Most Serene Republic of Lucca is occupied by the French Republic and the Republic of Lucca is created from the Most Serene Republic of Lucca.
- 13 June – The Parthenopean Republic annexed into the Kingdom of Naples. The State of New Jersey abolishes English common law in the state.
- 17 July – The Habsburg Empire occupies the Republic of Lucca and established a provisional government.
- 30 September – The Kingdom of Naples occupies the Roman Republic.

=== 1800 ===
- 25 January – The Commonwealth of Virginia reduces the penalty for free peoples for committing buggery to 1–10 years in prison, but did not reduce the death penalty for slaves.
- 20 June – The Subalpine Republic is created out of the Kingdom of Sardinia.
- October – The Papal states is re-created from the Roman Republic.
- 9 October – The French Republic re-occupies the Republic of Lucca.

== See also ==
- Timeline of LGBT history – timeline of events from 12,000 BCE to present
- LGBT rights by country or territory – current legal status around the world
- LGBT social movements
