= Leopoldine Code =

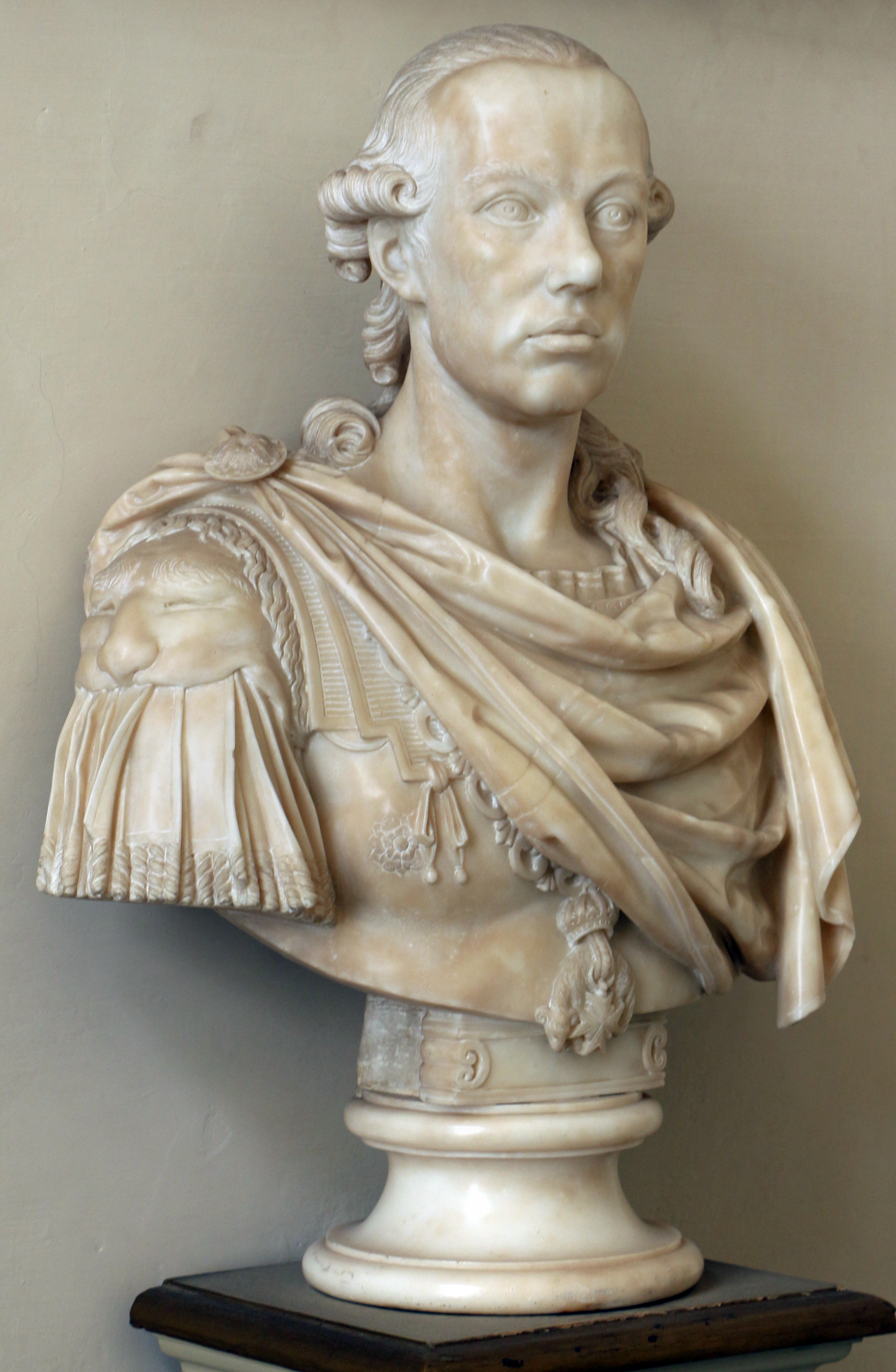
Bust of Grand Duke Leopold

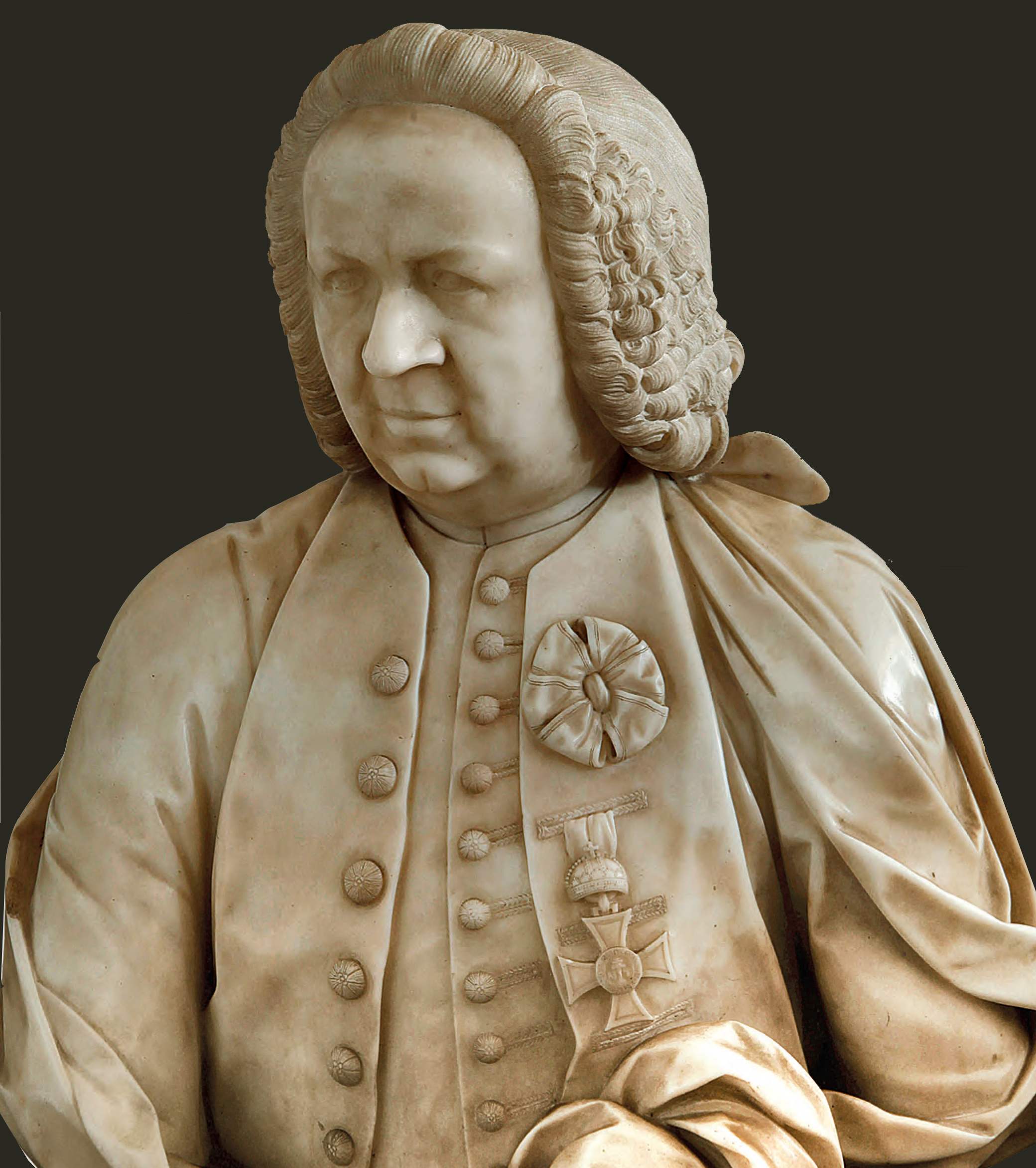
Bust of Pompeo Neri

The Leopoldine Code, soon known as the Leopoldine Law or simply the Leopoldina, refers to a reform of the criminal law of the Grand Duchy of Tuscany enacted on 30 November 1786 by Grand Duke Leopold I. With this legislation, the Grand Duchy was the first state in the world to formally abolish the death penalty.

Since 2000, Tuscany has commemorated the anniversary with the Tuscany Festival, which is celebrated on November 30, the day the code was promulgated.

== History ==
The promulgation of the Leopoldine Code was part of the intense reform effort undertaken by Grand Duke Leopold I. The Grand Duke was a follower of the Austrian jurist it:Carlo Antonio Martini, who was himself a follower of Cesare Beccaria. During his reign he was assisted by ministers such as the Florentine jurists it:Pompeo Neri and Giulio Rucellai.

After its enactment, the Code was partially modified in 1795 by Grand Duke Ferdinand III. The code was replaced in 1801 when Napoleon abolished the Grand Duchy of Tuscany and replaced it with the Kingdom of Etruria, later annexing Tuscany directly to France. During this time elements of the Code Napoleon were introduced in Tuscany. The Leopoldina was reinstated in 1814 when the Grand Duchy was restored. It then remained in force until 1853, when the new Tuscan Penal Code was enacted. In 1847 it also came into force in the territory of the former Duchy of Lucca, annexed that year to the Grand Duchy.

== Characteristics ==
From a formal point of view, the Leopoldina cannot be defined as a code in the modern sense, since it did not entirely repeal previous laws, but simply prescribed how they should be interpreted in accordance with the principles of the reform. It was also written in a discursive style, as if it were a treatise. It lacked systematic divisions and made no distinction between substantive and procedural matters.

The Leopoldina has therefore been described as an “infant code”, contrasting it with the first "mature" penal codifications of slightly later date, such as the 1787 Josephine code of Austria, the French revolutionary penal code of 1791, Austrian universal penal code of 1803, the Napoleonic and the French Penal Code of 1810. This description does not detract from the essential modernisation the Leopoldina represented, in contrast with ancient and fragmentary Tuscan norms and customs.

== Contents ==
In the area of criminal procedure, the Leopoldine reform modernized many aspects of the "inquisitorial method", then common in most legal systems except England, that had become alien to the Enlightenment mentality. Judicial torture, the imposition of oaths, and treating contumacy with confession were abolished, legal evidence was deprived of priority, provisional release was authorized, and the testing of witnesses by imprisonment was prohibited.

The criteria of leniency and gradualness were introduced into substantive law: as anticipated, the death penalty was abolished for the first time in Europe , and corporal punishments such as branding and mutilation, and tortures such as being tied with a rope, were abolished; confiscation of property and civil death were abolished as accessory punishments. However, some anachronistic punishments remained such as the pillory and flagellation; but the scope of more humane punishments such as fines, house arrest, imprisonment, exile or forced labour was extended.

The crime of sacrilege was abolished, but other crimes against religion (for example blasphemy and heresy) were maintained as they were considered contrary to public order.
