= Provisional Government of Tuscany =

The Provisional Government of Tuscany was the name of two historical administrations of the Tuscany region. The first was established during the French Revolutionary Wars in 1799, before being swept away by the restoration of legitimate government by the German armies. The second governed the territory roughly corresponding to today's Tuscany for twenty-two months, between 1859 and the birth of the Kingdom of Italy.

== The government of 1799 ==
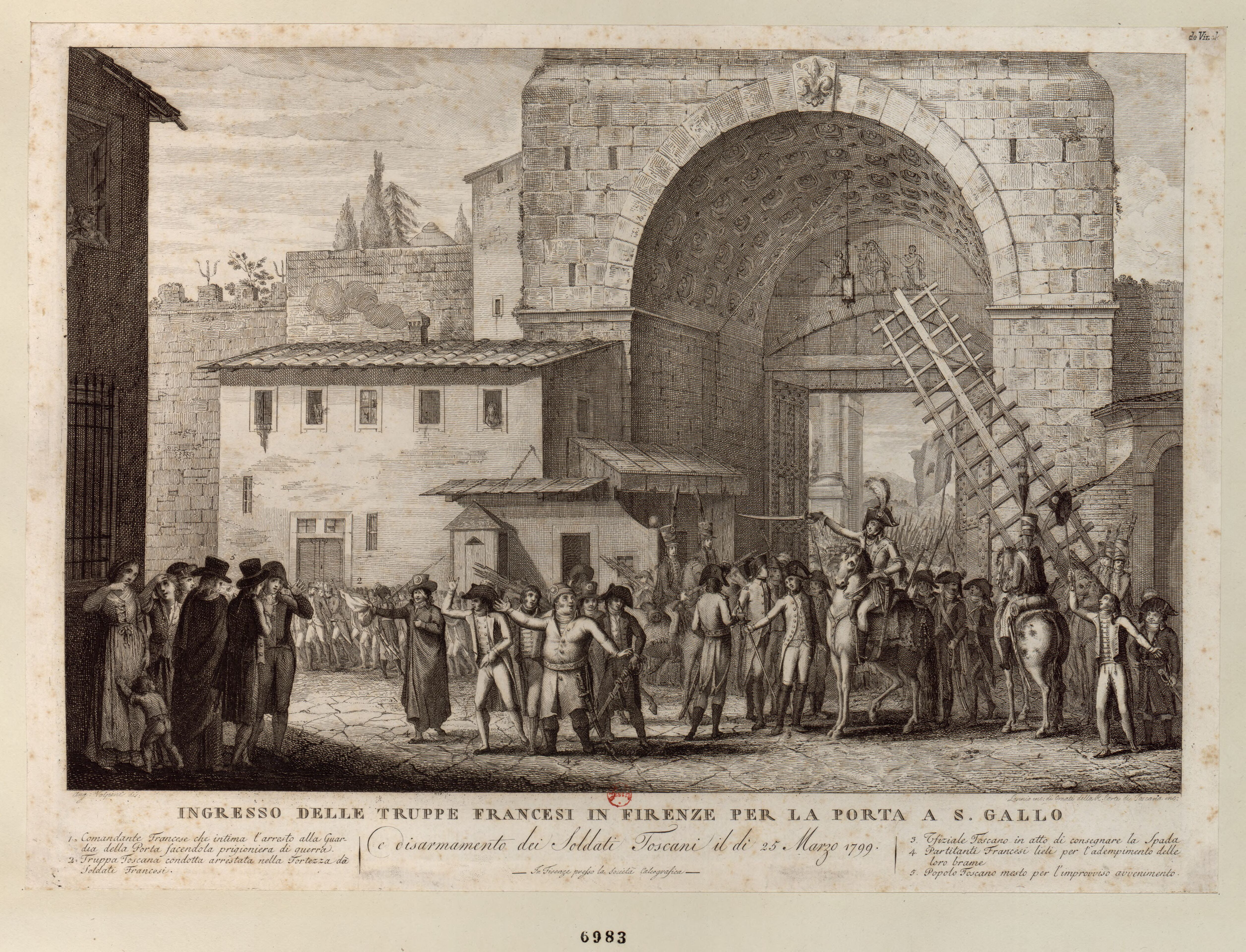
French troops enter Florence and disarm the Tuscan soldiers on 25 March 1799

The Grand Duchy of Tuscany had managed to escape almost unscathed from the War of the First Coalition against revolutionary France, reaching a peace based on a return to the status quo in 1795 and granting peaceful passage to the troops of Napoleon Bonaparte in 1797.

However the situation changed over the following months as the French took advantage of the truce to expand across almost the entire Italian peninsula, establishing sister republics in Rome and Naples as well. When a Second Coalition was formed and a new war broke out in 1799, the French immediately occupied Tuscany, the only region not yet under their control, and expelled the Grand Duke Ferdinand III. Under the command of the Commissioner of the Directory, Charles-Frédéric Reinhard, a provisional government was installed on 25 March under the presidency of Alessandro Rivani.

The government's was barely able to function and as early as May the conservative revolt spread in various provinces, especially in Arezzo. The advance of Austrian troops under Johann von Klenau then led to the collapse of French power and the restoration of the Grand Duchy by 5 July.

== The government of 1859 ==
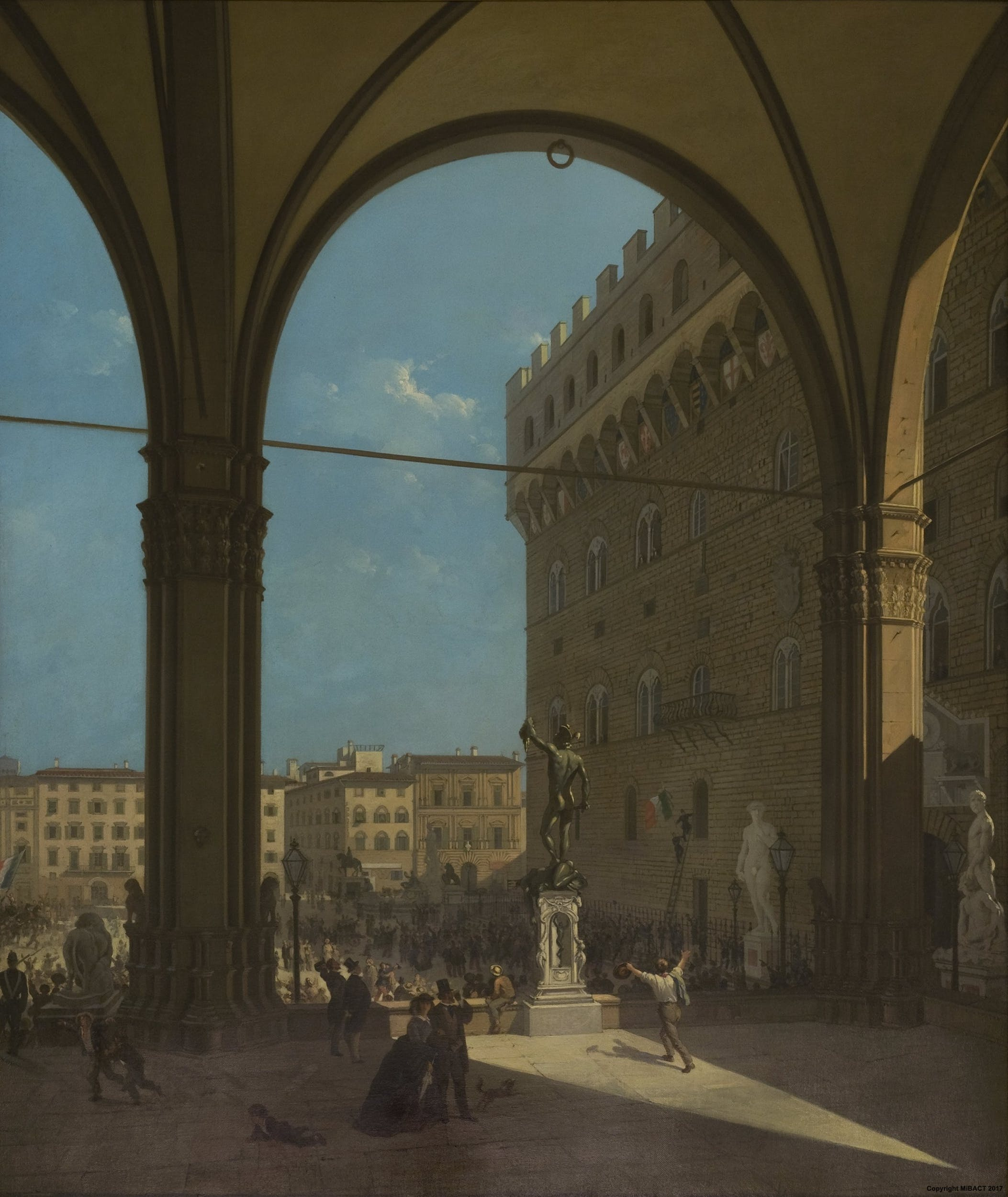
The peaceful expulsion of the Lorraine [i.e. the Grand Duke] from Florence, on the morning of April 27, 1859 - Enrico Fanfani

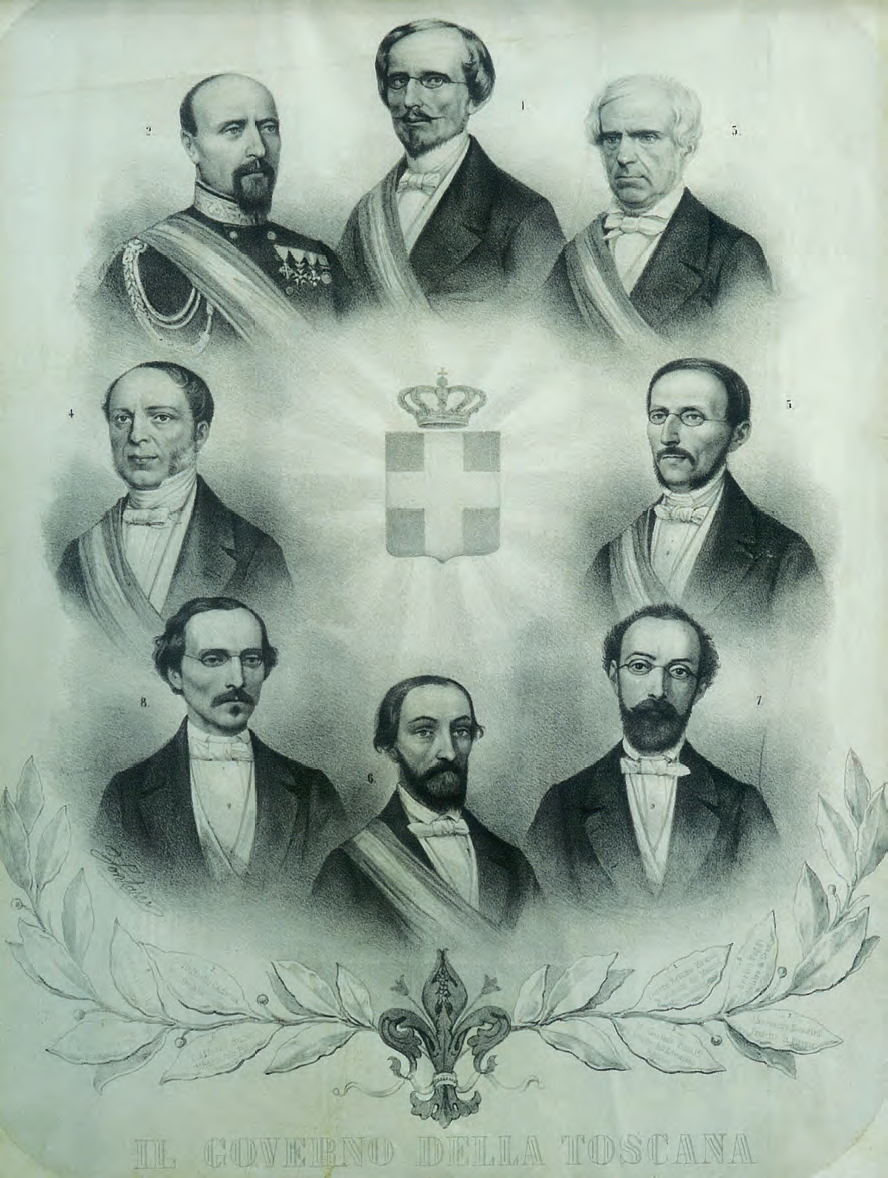
Provisional Government of Tuscany, 1859

=== Background ===
The popularity of Grand Duke Leopold II began to wane during the Revolutions of 1848 in the Italian states. In February 1848, Leopold II granted a liberal constitution and in March he had sent troops from Tuscany to fight alongside those from the Kingdom of Sardinia. Subsequently, however, his pro-Italian feelings were put to the test by the pressure both from his Habsburg relatives, and from the expansionist behaviour of Charles Albert of Sardinia. Intimidated by the behaviour of the democratic party which had been against his withdrawal of Tuscan troops from the front, and after a popular uprising in Livorno, the Grand Duke fled and took refuge in Gaeta. He was returned to the throne thanks to the Austrians although he but no longer enjoyed the trust of his people.

=== April 1859 ===
On 23 April 1859 international tensions rose as the Austrian Empire sent an ultimatum ordering Sardinia to withdraw its troops from the border. Soon afterwards a proclamation was circulated from "Tuscan soldiers" and addressed to their "Tuscan brothers", proclaiming the army’s wish to defy the Grand Duke’s policy of neutrality and fight alongside the Sardinian army against the Austrians.

On April 24, Easter Sunday, some units of the Tuscan army pretended not to hear the command to present arms to the Grand Duke and his court who were going to the Cathedral to hear mass. The following night a cry of "Long live Italy" went up in some barracks. The bust of the Grand Duke was smashed and the portraits of the Crown Prince and the commander of the Grand Ducal army, General Ferrari, were torn. That day, 25 April, there were hurried meetings between the leaders of the various factions, including those in favour of Italian unification and Tuscan constitutionalists, led by Baron Bettino Ricasoli, but no agreement was reached.

On 26 April Austria declared war on Sardinia and the Second Italian War of Independence began. That same night in Florence, the leaders of the various political factions met again, with many officers of the Tuscan army also present. A large demonstration was scheduled for the following day in all the main cities. On the morning of 27 April a large crowd descended on Barbano Square, shouting their support for Sardinia and their hostility to Austria. The troops demanded that the grand ducal flag, similar to the Habsburg standard, should be replaced with the tricolour and a declaration of war on Austria. Grand Duke Leopold, entrenched in the Pitti Palace with his ministers, summoned Prince Neri Corsini, a liberal who was not directly involved with the rebels, and asked him to form a new government, take a stand against Austria and grant a constitution. To calm the people he allowed the troops to raise the tricolour.

Prince Corsini went to the Sardinian legation where the conspiracy leaders were gathered, but returned to the Grand Duke with an intentionally unacceptable ultimatum, demanding his abdication along with the dismissal of the Ministry and of the general command who had spoken out against the national sentiment, an offensive and defensive alliance with Sardinia, prompt military collaboration and granting the command of the troops to General Ulloa. Leopold rejected such proposals, but he also refused to consider any serious possibility of using force against the Italian patriots, and on the evening of 27 April 1859, he and his family abandoned Florence for Bologna in a convoy of four carriages, to the indifference and silence of his now erstwhile subjects.

=== Establishment of the provisional government ===
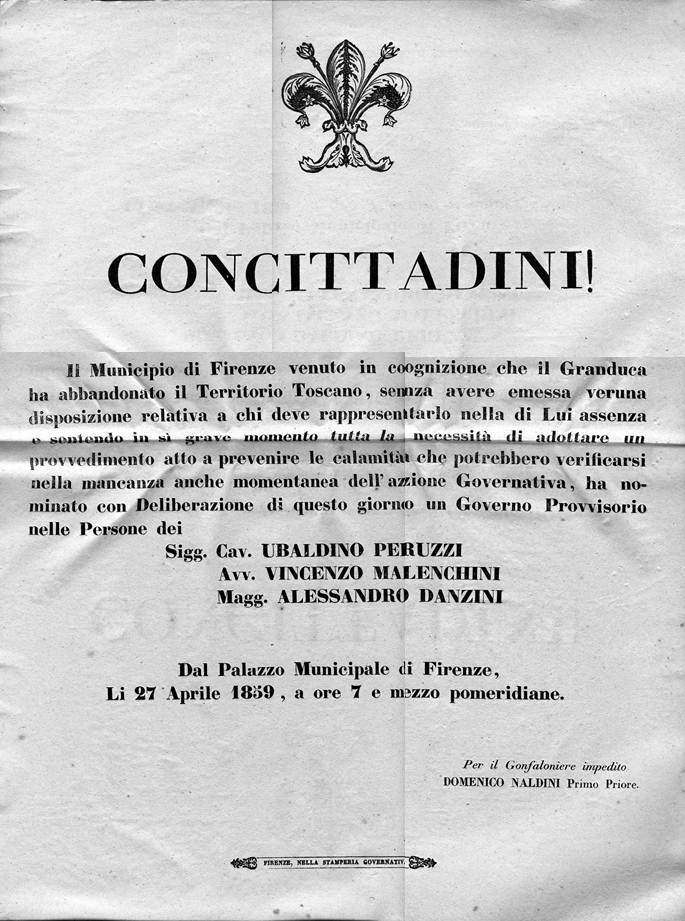
Poster proclaiming the provisional government

That same evening, as the Grand Duke had left no government in office before his departure, the municipality of Florence appointed a Tuscan Provisional Government made up of Ubaldino Peruzzi, it:Vincenzo Malenchini and Alessandro Danzini. On 28 April the provisional government offered dictatorship to Vittorio Emanuele II, but he declined, limiting himself to granting his protection to Tuscany and appointing his envoy Carlo Bon Compagni di Mombello as extraordinary commissioner. The commissioner first tried to form a directorate of technicians, but realising the impossibility of that approach, on 11 May he formed a cabinet with local notables: Bettino Ricasoli for the interior, Cosimo Ridolfi for foreign affairs and public education, Enrico Poggi for religion, Raffaele Busacca for finance, commerce and public works, and the Piedmontese Paolo De Cavero for war. General Ulloa was appointed commander of the army.

=== May-August 1859 ===
On May 23, the soldiers of the 5th French Army Corps landed at Livorno, under the command of Prince Napoléon-Jérôme Bonaparte, and occupied the Apennine passes to prevent any Austrian raids. On May 29, Tuscany declared its alliance with the Kingdom of Sardinia and France in the war against the Austrian Empire. Two days later, realizing there was no need for his presence in the Grand Duchy, Prince Napoleon set off for Lombardy with his troops and the Tuscan volunteer troops commanded by Ulloa.

After the armistice of Villafranca, on 1 August Bon Compagni handed over his powers to the council of ministers, chaired by Bettino Ricasoli. Measures were adopted aimed at annexation to the Kingdom of Sardinia, such as the introduction of the Savoy coat of arms and the Piedmontese lira in place of the grand ducal currency. In principle however sovereignty in Tuscany remained unaltered; on 21 July Leopold II, who had reached Vienna, abdicated in favour of his son Ferdinand IV, but the new Grand Duke made no attempt to assert his rule from exile.

=== Annexation and dissolution ===
On 11 and 12 March 1860 a plebiscite was held which supported the annexation of Tuscany to the Kingdom of Sardinia by a large majority: 366,571 votes in favour against 14,925 against (4,949 ballots were invalid). The Supreme Court of Cassation of the Provinces of Tuscany promulgated the annexation on 15 March 1860 and the formal act of annexation was signed a few days later, on 22 March; Prince Eugenio Emanuele, Count of Villafranca became the king’s lieutenant, with Bettino Ricasoli as governor general.

Unification was not achieved overnight; in fact, Tuscany was granted broad administrative autonomy, which lasted until February 14, 1861, four days before the first convocation of the Parliament of the newly formed Kingdom of Italy. The complete and final assimilation into the administrative structures of the new State was concluded in October of the same year with the decree of 9 October 1861, n. 274. The distinctive Tuscan Penal Code of 1853 remained in force in Tuscany until it was abolished in 1889 and replaced with the Zanardelli code tha5 for the first time brought all the territories of Italy under the same criminal law.
