= Savoy Penal Code =

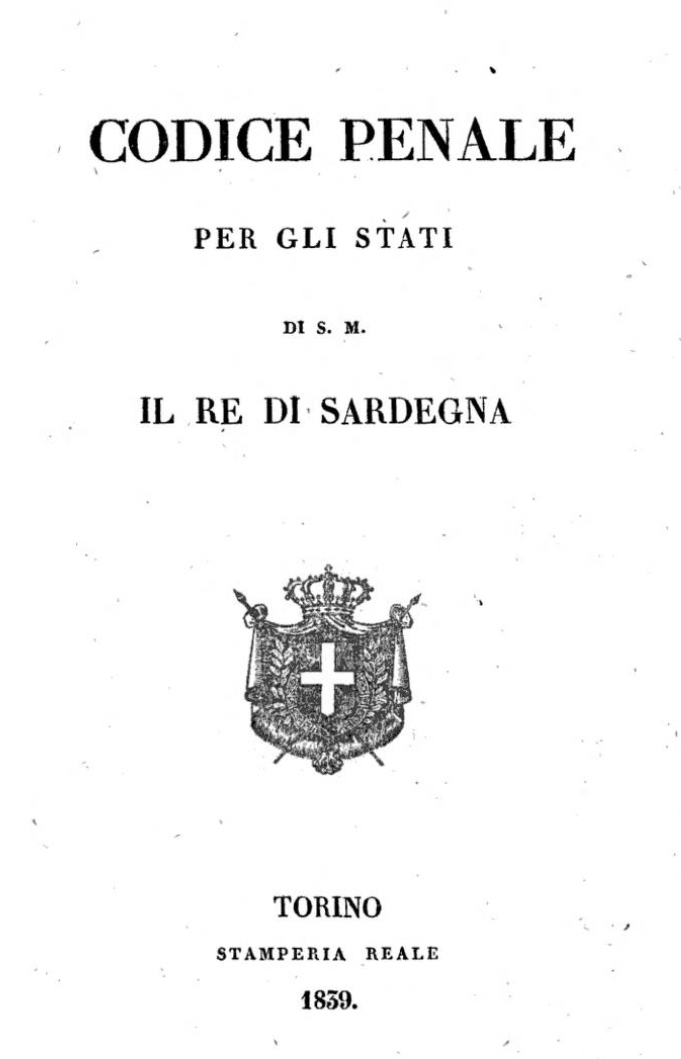
Title page of 1839 criminal code

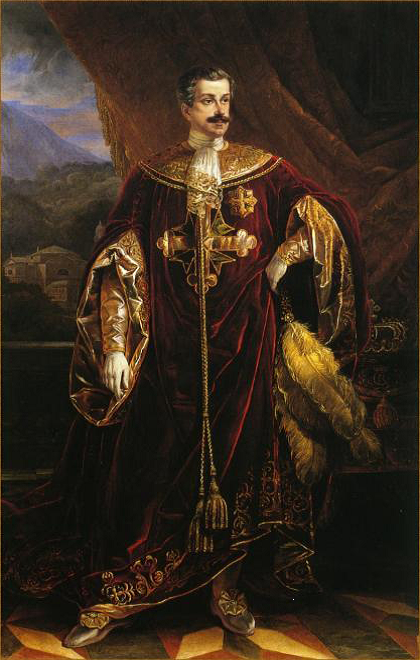
King Charles Albert of Savoy, 1840

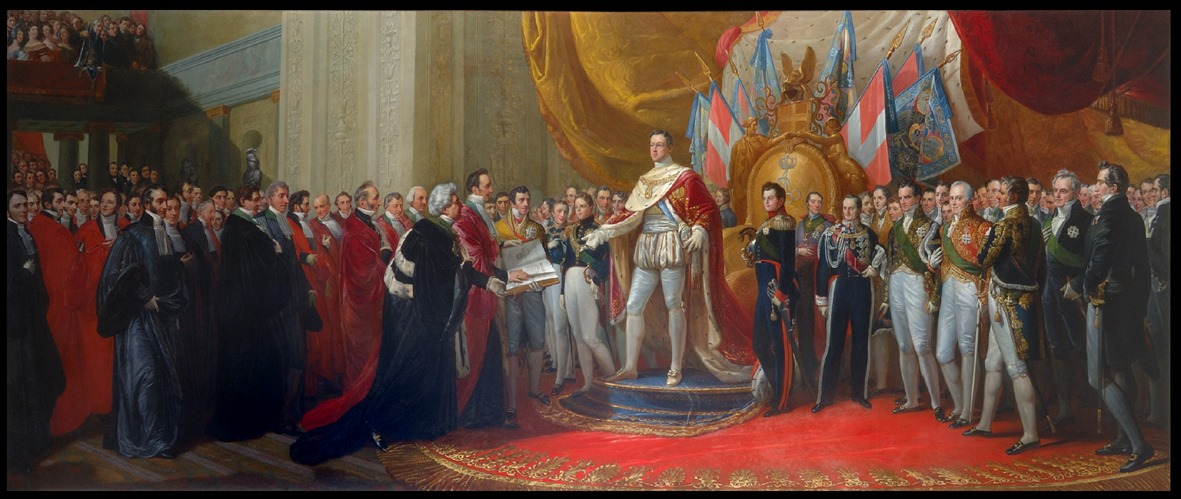
King Charles Albert promulgating the new civil code in 1837, shortly before the completion of the penal code

The Savoy Penal Code , sometimes described as the Codice Albertino (though that term is more commonly used only for the Savoy civil code), was the penal code of the Kingdom of Sardinia, promulgated by King Charles Albert of Savoy on 26 October 1839 and entering into force on 15 January 1840. The text was modified and re-promulgated in 1859 by Victor Emmanuel II, and remained in force in most of the newly formed Kingdom of Italy until the enactment of the Zanardelli Code of 1889.

== Background ==
In the mainland Savoy territories, before 1839 the criminal law consisted of the it:Piedmontese Constitutions of 1723, with its provisions updated in 1770, together with subsequent special legislation issued before 1800 and after 1814, (the period when French law was in force). Before 1839 on the island of Sardinia, the ancient medieval laws and customs had been consolidated in the so-called Felician Code of 1827.

In 1831, King Charles Albert announced his plans for extensive administrative and legislative reforms. He set up a legislative commission made up of jurists and magistrates under the presidency of Justice Minister it: Giuseppe Barbaroux. The commission was divided into four sections: civil legislation, civil procedure, commercial laws, and criminal matters. The penal code was drawn up by the fourth section of the Commission following a study of legislation in other countries, particularly the French Penal Code of 1810 and the criminal systems of other states in Italy.

== After promulgation ==
The year after the Penal Code was issued, in 1840, the Military Penal Code and new regulations on criminal procedure were issued, while a Code of Criminal Procedure was published only in 1847.

During the so-called "decade of preparation" for Italian unification (1849-59), important reforms were implemented to the legislation and state machinery of the Kingdom of Sardinia. As part of a comprehensive revision of the Savoy codes, the Penal Code was revised and promulgated in its new version on 20 November 1859, entering into force on 1 May 1860, together with the new Code of Criminal Procedure.

After the unification of Italy, however, the Savoy penal codification did not come into force in the territories of the former Grand Duchy of Tuscany, where the Tuscan Penal Code of 1853 continued to be applied, which had been amended of the death penalty by the provisional Tuscan Government in 1859. Even in the territories of the former Kingdom of the Two Sicilies the Savoy Code had to be integrated with some provisions deriving from the old Bourbon Code of 1819, heir to the Murat codification of 1812. For the rest, however, the Albertine text as amended in 1859 constituted the unitary Italian penal legislation until the promulgation of the so-called Zanardelli Code of 1889.

== Content ==
The text, closely following the structure of the French Penal Code of 1810, was composed of 739 articles divided into three books: penalties and general rules for their application and execution; crimes and misdemeanors and their penalties; contraventions and their penalties. The French-derived tripartite division into crimes, misdemeanors and contraventions was therefore maintained. In some respects the Savoy code was less severe than its French model; greater allowance was made for diminished responsibility as a result of age or disability, and penalties for attempted crimes were milder than those for crimes actually carried out.

However the text included some conservative aspects foreign to the Napoleonic model, such as the provision of sanctions against suicide, the provision of crimes such as abortion, as well as rape and adultery which were however considered crimes against the State and the maintenance of crimes against religion. It also treated homosexuality as a crime, even though France and several other states had already decriminalized it. When the code was applied in 1860 to the former Kingdom of the Two Sicilies, the articles concerning homosexuality were not applied in these territories. However the code also contained new aspects such as the purpose of reforming the offender. In fact, in the same year as the Code, 1839, a prison regulation inspired by humanitarian criteria was also issued.

The amendments of 1859 led to the abolition of crimes against religion, the limitation of the death penalty to thirteen cases and the mitigation of penalties for political crimes.
