= The Mistress of the Inn =

Play by Carlo Goldoni

- Scene from a 1956 production, Paris
- Original title: La locandiera
- Original language: Italian
- Written by: Carlo Goldoni
- Subject: Coquetry
- Genre: Comedy
- Setting: Mirandolina's inn in Florence

Premiere
- Date: 1753
- Place: Republic of Venice

The Mistress of the Inn (Italian: La locandiera [la lokanˈdjɛːra]), also translated as The Innkeeper Woman or Mirandolina (after the play's main character), is a 1753 three-act comedy by the Italian playwright Carlo Goldoni centred around a coquette. The play has been regarded as his masterpiece, with Frederick Davies describing it as "Goldoni's Much Ado About Nothing".

== Characters ==
- Mirandolina, the mistress of the inn
- Ripafratta, a knight (cavaliere)
- Marquis of Forlipopoli
- Count of Albafiorita
- Fabrizio, a servant of the inn
- the Baron's servant
- Ortensia
- Dejanira

== Plot ==
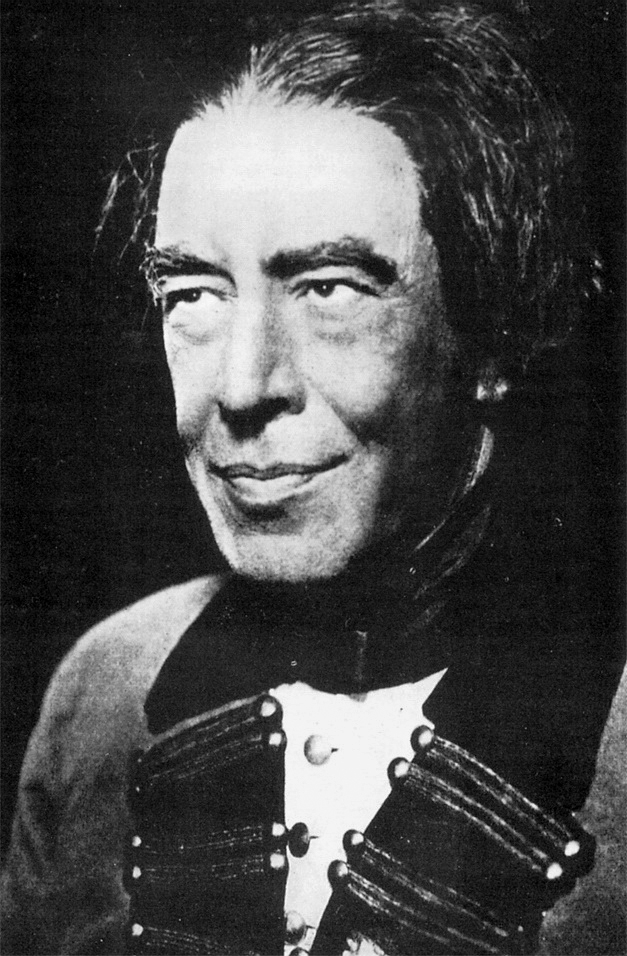
Constantin Stanislavski as Ripafratta in 1898

=== Act 1 ===
Mirandolina runs an inn in Florence and is constantly courted in marriage by all her clients, particularly the Marchese of Forlipopoli and the Conte of Albafiorita, who represent the two extremes of contemporary Venetian society, since the former is a born aristocrat who has fallen on hard times and sold his title whereas the latter is a young newly-rich merchant who has bought a title and become part of the new nobility. With only his honour to fall back on, the Marchese is convinced that offering his protection to Mirandolina will be enough to win her heart, whilst the Conte gives her many expensive gifts, believing he can buy her love just as he has bought his title. This reiterates the differences between the 'Nobles of the Sword' descended from the medieval nobility and 'Nobles of the Robe' who had bought their title. Mirandolina wisely does not accept either of the two men's attentions, leaving both of them still under the illusion that they can win her over.

The fragile equilibrium in the inn is broken by the arrival of the Cavaliere of Ripafratta, a haughty and inveterately woman-hating aristocrat inspired by the Florentine patrician Giulio Rucellai, to whom the play is dedicated. Anchored to his noble origins and lamenting the poor service at the inn, Ripafratta gives orders to Mirandolina and mocks Forlipopoli and Albafiorita for courting a woman. Not used to being treated as a servant and with her pride hurt, Mirandolina promises to make Ripafratta fall in love.

=== Act 2 ===
To make Ripafratta fall in love, Mirandolina appears more and more polite and attentive to him as time goes on, until he first seems to yield. He also claims to hate women who aim solely at marriage, gaining him a certain amount of genuine admiration from Mirandolina. He is unable to defend himself as he would like, as Mirandolina uses his own misogyny in her own favour, falsely making out that she thinks just like a man and despises women just as much as Ripafratta does.

Mirandolina also makes a great show of not wanting to give false compliments to the Marchese, who in one scene boasts of how good a Cypriot wine is when it actually tastes disgusting - Ripafratta cannot tell the truth to his adversary's face, but Mirandolina does not hesitate to do so, thus advancing her malicious strategy of seduction. This begins Ripafratta's fall - knowing that Mirandolina's talents are all ranged against him, he decides to leave the inn to save himself. However, it is too late for - as he goes - she makes her final assault and pretends to faint, making Ripafratta decide to stay on after all.

=== Act 3 ===
Fabrizio, a waiter at the inn, is very jealous of Mirandolina's affections. She even receives a golden bottle as a gift from Ripafratta, but she throws it into a basket in contempt and then openly shows her hostility towards Ripafratta, telling him not to believe her previous protestations of love. Torn apart by conflicting emotions and unwilling to reveal he has been deceived by a woman, Ripafratta still hopes he can win her over. When Albafiorita and Forlipopoli accuse Ripafratta of being in love with Mirandolina, Ripafratta's wounded pride explodes into an argument which threatens to end in tragedy, but Mirandolina intervenes and prevents it degenerating into a duel.

Noticing the golden bottle in the basket and thinking it to be of little value, Forlipopoli takes it and gives it to Dejanira, one of two actresses who have just arrived at the inn pretending to be noblewomen. Since Ripafratta's love has finally become public, Mirandolina's revenge is finally complete, but this brings the resentment of Albafiorita and Forlipopoli. Ripafratta then falls into a rage and begins to appear dangerous, at which point Mirandolina recognises that she may have gone too far. She decides instead to marry Fabrizio, as her father had advised on his deathbed - she does not love him but she decides to take advantage of the situation as she knows the marriage won't be a real obstacle to her freedom. She regains possession of the bottle given to her by Ripafratta and the last scene ends as she turns to the male audience and urges them not to be deceived.

== Production history ==
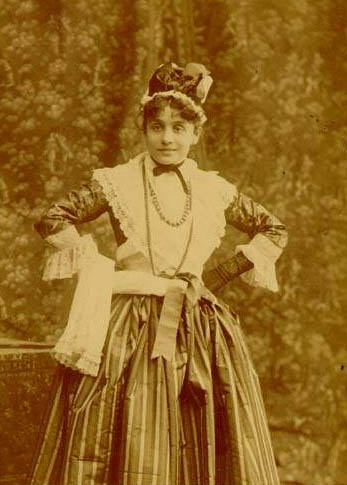
Eleonora Duse as Mirandolina in 1891

Eleonora Duse is one of the actresses to have played its lead role, Mirandolina; she gave a command performance for Queen Victoria at Windsor on 18 May 1894.

The play was one of those produced by the world-famous Moscow Art Theatre (MAT) in its first season. This production opened in a double-bill with Greta's Happiness by Emilia Matthai on 2 December 1898. It was directed by Constantin Stanislavski, who also played the misogynist Ripafratta. Stanislavski directed the play in a second production at the MAT, which opened on 3 February 1914 after 112 rehearsals. He played the role of Ripafratta once more. The artist Alexandre Benois provided the scenic design for this production, which was conceived as a showcase for the actress Olga Gzovskaya.

== Adaptations ==
In 1773 the Venetian composer Antonio Salieri and the librettist Domenico Poggi adapted the play as a three-act dramma giocoso. In 1800 the German composer Simon Mayr and Italian librettist Gaetano Rossi adapted it as a two-act dramma giocoso. The American composer Henry Kimball Hadley adapted it as a one-act comic opera called Bianca, which was first performed in 1918. Bohuslav Martinů also produced an operatic version, his three-act Mirandolina, which was first performed in 1959. The play was also adapted into several films, notably Paolo Cavara's La locandiera and Tinto Brass' Miranda. In 2026, Irish playwright Marina Carr wrote Mirandolina, a play inspired by Goldoni's masterpiece.

== See also ==
- Miranda (1985 film)

== Sources ==
- Balthazar, Scott L. 1992. "Mayr, Simon." In The New Grove Dictionary of Opera. Ed. Stanley Sadie. London: Macmillan. ISBN 0-333-73432-7.
- Banham, Martin, ed. 1998. The Cambridge Guide to Theatre. Cambridge: Cambridge UP. ISBN 0-521-43437-8.
- Benedetti, Jean. 1999. Stanislavski: His Life and Art. Revised edition. Original edition published in 1988. London: Methuen. ISBN 0-413-52520-1.
- Boardman, Herbert R. 1932. Henry Hadley: Ambassador of Harmony. Georgia: Banner P.
- Davies, Frederick, trans. 1968. Four Comedies. By Carlo Goldoni. London: Penguin. ISBN 0-14-044204-9.
- Hartnoll, Phyllis, ed. 1983. The Oxford Companion to the Theatre. 4th ed. Oxford: Oxford UP. ISBN 0-19-211546-4.
- Rice, John A. 1992. "Salieri, Antonio." In The New Grove Dictionary of Opera. Ed. Stanley Sadie. London: Macmillan. ISBN 0-333-73432-7.
- Worrall, Nick. 1996. The Moscow Art Theatre. Theatre Production Studies ser. London and NY: Routledge. ISBN 0-415-05598-9.
