= Chief magistrate =

Senior judge or senior administrative official

A chief magistrate is a public official, executive or judicial, whose office is the highest in its class. Historically, the two different meanings of magistrate have often overlapped and refer to, as the case may be, to a major political and administrative officer (usually at a subnational or colonial level) or a judge and barrister.

== Governing chief magistrates ==
When a chief magistrate governs a jurisdiction with statehood (sovereign or not), they are typically its head of state and chief executive. The exact authority of these roles, however, depends on the specific circumstances.

=== European states ===
Chief magistratures in antiquity include the following titles:

- Consul
- Dictator
- Rex
- Suffet

Chief magistratures in the feudal era (and sometimes beyond) include the following titles:

- Consul
- Gonfaloniere
- Lord Mayor, mayor and various close equivalents such as Oberbürgermeister or Bürgermeister in German language, (lord) provost in Scotland
- Podestà
- Presidente del magistrato
- Rettore

"Chief magistrate" is also used as a generic term in English for the various offices in the role of head of state of the various Swiss (confederal) cantons, with such styles as Landamman.

=== Colonial functions and titles ===
- The Cayman Islands were part of the English, and later British, Empire since 18 July 1670. Initially part of Jamaica, they were proclaimed a crown colony on 4 July 1959, this Colony receiving its own Administrator and eventually a Governor. When the first permanent settlements were established, circa 1734, the highest colonial authority was styled Chief Magistrate. There were eight holders of the position until 1898, when the new post of Commissioner was created.
- The Bay Islands, settled by the British in 1827, were claimed by Britain until 1860 as well as by their ultimate owner Honduras. Britain appointed two consecutive chief magistrates (William Fitzgibbon [acting] in 1850, and John James Hall, 1850–1852) before declaring the islands a crown colony under the Governor of Jamaica, represented locally by two consecutive Presiding Magistrates: Charles Henry Johnes Cuyler, 1852–1855, and Alexander Wilson Moir, 1855–1860.
- In December 1832, the Port Cresson colony was founded by the Black Quakers of the New York and Pennsylvania Colonization Societies. After it was destroyed by Bassa natives in June 1835, it was reestablished the following month as Bassa Cove colony, which in 1837 annexed the Edina settlement, also formed by the New York and Pennsylvania Colonization Societies. Until its 1 April 1839 incorporation into Liberia, its de facto governors were styled Chief Magistrate.
- Norfolk Island was since 1 November 1856 governed as a separate territory (subordinated to New South Wales), where on 8 June 1856 the Pitcairn islanders were resettled. The highest colonial authorities were its many consecutive chief magistrates, till its self-government was revoked on 15 January 1897; afterwards, administrators were appointed.
- While Zululand was a separate British crown colony from 21 June 1887 until its 1 December 1897 incorporation into the Colony of Natal, it was nominally under the governorship of the British governors of Natal, but the highest colonial authority on the spot was titled Resident Commissioner and Chief Magistrate:
  - 1887–1893 Sir Melmoth Osborn (1834–1899)
  - 1893–1 December 1897 Sir Marshall James Clarke (1841–d. 1909)
- When on 23 January 1894 South Zambesia (the future Southern Rhodesia, present Zimbabwe) was created from Mashonaland and Matabeleland protectorates (both had been privately owned by the British South Africa Company), it was administered by a Chief Magistrate of South Zambesia:
  - 23 January 1894 – May 1894 Andrew Duncan (acting)
  - May 1894 – 9 September 1894 Leander Starr Jameson (b. 1853 – d. 1917), who stayed on as the first Administrator of the Rhodesia Protectorate (the 3 May 1895 union of South Zambesia and North Zambesia – present Zambia – as Rhodesia Protectorate).

=== References to the U.S. presidency ===
References to the President of the United States as "Chief Magistrate" were common in the early years of U.S. existence, although use of the term is rare today. In 1793, George Washington described himself as his country's "Chief Magistrate" in his second inaugural address. In 1800, Alexander Hamilton wrote in a private letter to Aaron Burr, later published by Burr with his permission, that he considered John Adams "unfit for the office of Chief Magistrate." James Monroe told the 18th Congress, shortly before leaving office in a House report dated February 21, 1825, "By the duties of this office, the great interests of the nation are placed, in their most important branches, under the care of the Chief Magistrate." Abraham Lincoln referred to the President as chief magistrate in his first inaugural address in 1861. In 1908, Woodrow Wilson remarked, "Men of ordinary physique and discretion cannot be Presidents and live, if the strain cannot be somehow relieved. We shall be obliged to always be picking our chief magistrates from among wise and prudent athletes, a small class." Wilson was himself elected President four years later.

=== British Lord Protector ===
In the British Interregnum and during the existence of the Commonwealth of England, Scotland and Ireland, the Lord Protector was referred to as 'Chief Magistrate' in the state's two major constitutional documents: the Instrument of Government (1653) and the Humble Petition and Advice (1657).

== Judicial chief magistrates ==
Unlike the previous section, this does not require any political autonomy for the jurisdiction, so there can be additional circumscriptions, even created solely for the administration of justice. It is not uncommon for magistratures to perform additional functions separate from litigation and arbitration, rather as a registrar or notary, but as these are not their defining core-business, they are irrelevant in the context of this article.

The Lord Mayor of London is the chief magistrate of the City of London.

- Chief Magistrate of England and Wales

=== Sri Lanka ===
In Sri Lanka, the Chief Magistrate's Court in Colombo is the senior of the magistrate's courts in the judicial division of Colombo.

=== India ===
In India, Chief Judicial Magistrate Courts in the districts is the senior of the magistrate courts in the judicial districts. Courts of the Chief Judicial Magistrate is the apex body of criminal judiciary in the districts.

== See also ==
- Chief justice

== Sources and references ==
- Cornog, Evan and Whelan, Richard, Hats in the Ring: An Illustrated History of American Presidential Campaigns (Random House, N.Y. 2000)
