= Giulio Rucellai =

Italian politician (1702 – 1778)

Giulio Rucellai (31 May 1702 – 1778) was a Florentine politician and member of the patrician Rucellai family. A Freemason, he was a member of the English lodge in Florence and is also notable as the dedicatee of Carlo Goldoni's The Mistress of the Inn (in which he also provided the basis of the character the Cavaliere di Ripafratta).

== Life ==
Born in Florence, he was a professor of civil law at the University of Pisa from 1727 to 1731, later becoming Royal Secretary of Law. In 1738 he, the auditor Pompeo Neri, marquess Antonio Niccolini (student of law and church history), Filippo Luci (1674-1750; another patrician and fiscal auditor to the Grand Duchy of Tuscany from 1737 to 1746) became the founder members of the grand ducal deputation created to combat the disorders regarding carrying weapons. Florence's Inquisition claimed this topic as falling within its own jurisdiction and so came into conflict with the deputation, but Rucellai and Emmanuel de Nay, count of Richecourt commissioned the deputation to reaffirm the grand duchy's sovereignty against episcopal abuses.

Having been made minister of ecclesiastical affairs to the Regency by Grand Duke Pietro Leopoldo, Rucellai was one of the chief movers behind the liberal reforms which turned Tuscany into one of the most advanced states in 18th century Europe. For example, his ecclesiastical reforms, on which Rucellai wrote a book (Memorandum sui diritti della Nunziatura apostolica, dell'Inquisizione e sul diritto di asilo ecclesiastico, nonché sulla necessità e possibilità di diminuire il numero di chierici e di monaci), were the basis for the 1769 decrees which abolished church's right of asylum and set up a grand ducal 'exequatur' for every act and document issued by foreign bodies or powers such as the Papal States, with the approval of Pope Clement XIV. Soon afterwards civil tribunals were given charge over monastic prisons (such as the one at Santa Maria Novella, then in a very insanitary condition) and later initial measures were taken to suppress monastic institutions that were not also serving a charitable or welfare function. He died in Florence.

== See also ==
- Leopoldine Code

== Bibliography (in Italian) ==
- AA.VV. Raccolta della leggi toscane delle quali fu ordinata la pubblicazione nella città e territorio di Lucca col. R. decreto del 26 febbrajo 1848. Firenze, Stamperia Granducale, 1848
- Becagli, Vieri. Pompeo Neri e le riforme istituzionali della prima età leopoldina in Pompeo Neri. Atti del colloquio di studi di Castelfiorentino (6-7 maggio 1988)., a cura di Aldo Fratoianni, Marcello Verga, Castelfiorentino, Società Storica della Valdelsa, 1992, pp. 333–371
- Diaz, Furio. Dal movimento dei lumi al movimento dei popoli: l'Europa tra illuminismo e rivoluzione. Bologna, Il Mulino, 1986
- Diaz, Furio. I Lorena in Toscana: la reggenza. Torino, UTET, 1987
- Pasquinelli, Andrea. "Giulio Rucellai, Segretario del Regio Diritto (1734 - 1778). Alle origini delle riforme leopoldine del clero" in "Ricerche storiche", XIII, 2, 1983
- Verga, Marcello. Da "cittadini" a "nobili", lotta politica e riforma delle istituzioni nella Toscana di Francesco Stefano. Giuffrè, 1990
- Zobi, Antonio. Storia civile della Toscana: dal MDCCXXXVII al MDCCCXLVIII. Presso L. Molini, 1850
