= Administrative police (France) =

Administrative police in France are French police tasked with preventing disturbances to the ordre public. and ensuring the public peace and preventing crime. Ordre public or public peace in a society includes public tranquility, safety and well-being. Two types of ordre public exist:

- Management that protects the general interest of society;
- Protection of the most vulnerable, generally by a more powerful party, for example of a consumer or a non-professional from a professional, or of a tenant from a landlord. Similarly labour law also falls into this category.

A norm of ordre public is an imperative that the parties cannot set aside, generally in the name of protecting the weaker party.

Administrative policing can fall under either local or national jurisdiction, but does not include searching for, or arresting, the perpetrator(s) of a particular offense. For example the French Border Police and the traffic police have certain powers to detain and ask for identification, but are not involved in criminal investigations.

The goals of administrative police are distinct from those of the judicial police who, under Article 14 of the Code of Criminal Procedure can investigate and arrest people for prosecution and punishment.

The separation of administrative and judicial policing functions dates from the 1795 Code of Offences and Penalties, and is still in force today. This functional distinction does not necessarily imply an organizational separation: a single organization may perform both types of policing: an example is the National Gendarmerie.

== Overview ==
Administrative policing is an activity intended to assure the ordre public but does not include searching for, or arresting, the perpetrator of a given breach of the law.

This teleological definition focuses on the goal of administrative policing, and takes into account the following functional and organic definitions:

- Administrative policing designates activity tied to public safety.
- Administrative policing designates the agencies in which this activity is invested.

== Concept of ordre public ==
Administrative policing is defined by its goal of public peace (ordre public) which according to Article L.2212-2 of the code général des collectivités territoriales assures "good order, safety, security, and public health". Safety speaks to a limit to disorder, security to limiting the risk of accidents, and public health to limiting the risk of illness. It can be likened to the American theory of the police power.

Good order is a more imprecise concept which has allowed the scope of the administrative police to expand and take into account morality and the protection of individuals against themselves. Article L.2212-2 of the code général des collectivités territoriales mandates the municipal police, but administrative policing is also exercised by those whose ordre public authority stems from the Minister of the Interior. Article 12 of the Declaration of the Rights of Man and Citizen of 1789 is a foundational text for that authority,

Initially, administrative judges only took immorality into account if it might provoke a significant disorder. Today they do take morality into account, notably in the case of cinema, if this is justified by local circumstances. (Conseil d'Etat, 18 December 1959, Société des films Lutetia)

Morality has also been monitored in terms of respect for preserving human dignity, since the Morsang-sur-Orge decision; (Conseil d'État, 27 October 1995), which concerned dwarf tossing.

The Conseil d'État can also take into account esthetic issues (2 August 1924), Leroux, 18 February 1972, Chambre syndicale des entreprises artisanales du bâtiment de la Haute-Garonne: the Conseil d'État overturned an order of the mayor of Toulouse that for esthetic reasons very precisely regulated the dimensions and shape of funerary monuments in the cemetery). But this decision is outdated, and currently put back in question by the law of 19 December 2008 which gave the mayor police power over the monuments under the supervision of the administrative judge.

The legality of administrative police actions to protect individuals against themselves (22 January 1982), Auto défense and 9 July 2001, Préfet du Loiret), and protect a person mise en examen or charged with a crime. (TC 19 October 1998, veuve Laroche)) or protected the location of a possible crime (TC 12 December 2005, Prefect of Champagne-Ardenne).

== Administrative and judicial police ==
The judicial police are charged with noting an infraction and finding or arresting its authors. Its function is thus repressive, as opposed to the preventive nature of administrative policing.

The distinction is essential where jurisdiction is uncertain and may lie with first an administrative judge, then a judicial judge, as it for responsibility, which is more easily triggered by administrative policing activities.

== Characteristics of administrative policing ==
Administrative policing manifests unilateral prescriptions. These administrative decisions may take the form of regulations (decrees, arrêtés, ...) or individual rulings (individual authorization, visa or use licence, permit, ID check, body searches, ...). Police powers cannot be delegated to an individual.

Administrative police power can be general or special. In the latter case it applies only to certain categories of person (foreigners), of places (railway stations, airports), or of activities (hunting, fishing, cinema).

The administration has a duty to exercise its police power, but refusing to do so is only illegal if this refusal results in a failure to meet its legal obligations to maintain the ordre public. In the same way, a refusal to take police action need not be explained. Police actions never create rights and therefore may always be withdrawn, since the administration only acts on its responsibility in cases of faute lourde.

=== Mixed operations ===
The distinction between administrative policing and judicial policingis nonetheless sometimes delicate. Indeed, it is often exercised by the same individuals (police, gendarmes) and an administrative police operation may transform into a judicial police operation. For example, police officers who carry out body searches ("frisking") at the entrance to a stadium do so as an exercise of their administrative police powers (prevention of violence), but if in so doing they find narcotics, any subsequent arrest would be a judicial police operation (acting on an infraction). Inversely, a judicial police operation may transform into an administrative police operation. For example towing and impounding a vehicle (a judiciary police operation) but once the vehicle was impounded, an administrative police operation.

=== Jurisprudence concerning the distinction between types of policing system ===
In 1951, with the consorts Baud judgement, the Conseil d'État clarified the criterion of the "finality" of the operation. This criterion was taken back up in that same year by the Tribunal des conflits in the Dame Noualek judgement. and by the Court of cassation in the Giry decision

== Holders of police power ==
Police power is shared among several holders.

=== National level ===
The Prime minister as holder of the general regulatory power (Article 21 of the Constitution of 4 October 1958) exercises police power at the national level .

The special authorities of the police are different: the Minister of Culture is charged with policing cinema; the Minister of the Interior with policing foreigners.

=== Zone level ===
The préfet de zone de défense et de sécurité disposes of both general and special powers.

=== Departmental level ===
The president of the Conseil départemental has been a police authority since the loi du 2 mars 1982, in the area of traffic circulation on departmental roads outside of municipalities.

Le police prefect is the police authority at the departmental level for traffic on highways (routes nationales) outside of municipalities but especially for the many special police forces (hunting, fishing, environment, sanitation, and through control of municipal police).

The power of the prefect also extends to continental waters.

=== Commune level ===
The mayor exercises police power on the level of the commune.

In communes with more than 20,000 inhabitants, however, as well as of certain smaller communes, police personnel fall under the state's French Civil Service even though it executes the arrêtés of the mayor's policing. The prefect assures respect for the public peace.

In Paris, the mayor only has very limited powers in matters of policing: fairs and markets, and cleanliness of the public roadways. The other police powers belong to the prefect of police.

== See also ==
- Code of Offences and Penalties
- Codification (law)
- Cour d'appel (Appellate court)
- Court of Appeal (France)
- Court of Cassation
- Criminal justice system of France
- Declaration of the Rights of Man and of the Citizen
- French penal code
- Law of France
- Napoleonic Code – civil, not criminal
- Nulla poena sine lege
- Principle of legality in French criminal law

== Works cited ==
- John Bell; Sophie Boyron; Simon Whittaker (27 March 2008). Principles of French Law (2 ed.). OUP Oxford. pp. 129–. ISBN 978-0-19-101889-3. OCLC 865331945.
- Chambers's Encyclopaedia: A Dictionary of Universal Knowledge, Volume 8. W. & R. Chambers, Limited. 1896. pp. 286–. OCLC 235817290.
- Donnelly, Daniel (21 January 2013). Municipal Policing in the European Union: Comparative Perspectives. Springer. pp. 37–. ISBN 978-1-137-29061-8. OCLC 1005811336.
