= French Penal Code of 1810 =

Napoleonic-era French penal code

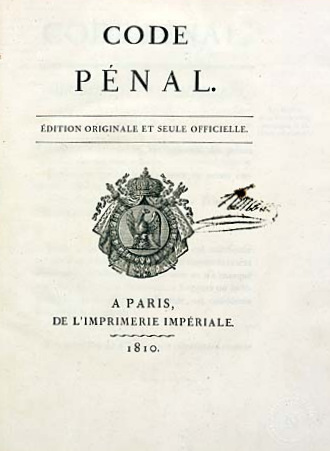
The 1810 Penal Code

The Penal Code of 1810 (French: Code pénal de 1810) was a code of criminal law created under Napoleon which replaced the Penal Code of 1791. Among other things, this code reinstated a life imprisonment punishment, as well as branding. These had been abolished in the French Penal Code of 1791. Issued on June 3, 1810, it stayed in use until March 1, 1994 when it was replaced by the French criminal code.

This code served as a basis for criminal laws in many of the countries occupied at the time by the First French Empire. It was the fifth code promulgated by the Empire, and is not to be confused with the Code Napoleon of 1804 which governed civil law.

== History ==
The initial move towards a new, cohesive French civil code was made in July 1800, when First Consul Napoleon Bonaparte appointed a four-man commission composed of Portalis, Tronchet, Bigot de Preamneneu, and Malleville to draft a project. Before the Napoleonic Code, France did not have a single set of laws; law consisted mainly of local customs, which had sometimes been officially compiled in "custumals" (coutumes), notably the Custom of Paris. There were also exemptions, privileges, and special charters granted by the kings or other feudal lords. During the Revolution, the last vestiges of feudalism were abolished. Penal law in particular had been a source of great controversy during the French Revolution, which had promulgated the Penal Code of 1791 and numerous constitutions. The new Penal Code was to replace various laws adopted during the first ten years of the Revolution, the backbone of which was the Penal Code of 1791 and the Code of Offences and Penalties of 1795. An important feature of these two texts, which came after centuries of relentless severity, was to have fixed penalties to keep the role of judge strictly distributive, therefore eliminating the dangers of arbitrary sentencing. With the 1810 Penal Code, however, the sentences were given a set range, letting the judges decide more freely on the severity of the punishment.

Like the 1791 Penal Code, the 1810 Penal Code did not include religious crimes such as heresy, sodomy or blasphemy, thereby legalising them by omission. However, abortion was made illegal, and it was harder for wives than husbands to file for divorce.

The 1810 Penal Code was revised twice in its life: once very importantly in 1832, the second, much more limited, in 1863. In 1974, the project for a new penal code began, but was not completed until 1994.

== Contents ==
=== Presentation ===
The 1810 Penal Code was divided into four books, with the third split into two parts:

1. Correctional sentences and their effects
2. Persons punishable, excusable or responsible for crimes or misdemeanors
3. Crimes, misdemeanors and their punishments
  1. crimes against public property
  2. crimes and offenses against individuals
4. Police contraventions and penalties

=== Crimes and punishments ===
Unlike the 1791 Penal Code, which only tackled the most serious crimes, with lesser crimes being codified in the Code of Offences and Penalties, the 1810 Penal Code grouped together all crimes. Violations were punished by fine and, at most, five days in prison. Misdemeanors were punished by up to five years in prison and fines. Penalties for felonies were to be either afflictives et infamantes (punishing and degrading) or merely infamantes (degrading), meaning the convicted lost some civil rights, such as the right to vote and to possess arms.

Felonies were to be punished by death, hard labor for life or a term from five to twenty years or by reclusion from five to ten years.

Forfeiture of estate, lifelong transportation or banishment for a term between five and ten years were available for crimes against the state (which included treason, espionage, sedition and insurrection, and were severely punished, up to death with forfeiture of the convict's estate, or transportation).

Aggravated murder, this is to say, premeditated, committed during the commission of a crime or against legitimate ascendants were to be punished by death, along with kidnapping by torture, death threats or under the guise of a civil servants.

In addition, non-political felons could undergo supervision by the police.

The death sentence had to be carried out by beheading via the guillotine.

== In popular culture ==
In Victor Hugo's 1862 novel Les Miserables, main character Jean Valjean is sentenced under the 1810 Penal Code to a sentence of hard labour for theft.

== See also ==
- Capital punishment in France
- French criminal law
- Life imprisonment in France
- Savoy Penal Code

== Notes ==
Preceded by French Penal Code 1791	Penal code of France; 1810–1994	Succeeded by New Penal Code of 1994
