= Bolognese Republic =

European polity

Bolognese Republic Repubblica Bolognese
- 1796–1796
- Status: Client state of France
- Capital: Bologna
- Common languages: Italian
- Government: Republic
- Historical era: French Revolutionary Wars
  - Established: June 1796
  - Annexed by the Cispadane Republic: 16 October 1796
Preceded by	Succeeded by
Papal States	Cispadane Republic

The Bolognese Republic was created in 1796 in the Central Italian city of Bologna. It merged the existing provinces of Bologna and Ferrara into one.

== History ==
The Bolognese Republic was a French client republic established when Papal authorities escaped from the city of Bologna in June 1796. It was annexed by the Cispadane Republic on 16 October 1796.

It was given the first Jacobin Constitution written in Italy. It had a government consisting of nine consuls and its head of state was the Presidente del Magistrato, i.e. Chief magistrate, a presiding office held for four months by one of the consuls.
