= Zanardelli Code =

Italian criminal code (1890–1930)

The Italian Penal Code of 1889 (Italian: Codice penale italiano del 1889), commonly known as the Zanardelli Code (Codice Zanardelli), was the criminal code in effect in the Kingdom of Italy from 1890 to 1930, and it is still in effect in Vatican City. The Zanardelli code gets its name from Giuseppe Zanardelli, then Minister of Justice, who lobbied for the code's approval. It unified penal legislation in Italy, abolished capital punishment, and recognised the right to strike.

== Report to the King ==
In his Report to the King (Italian: Relazione al Re), Zanardelli said he was convinced that "laws must be written in such a way that even uneducated men can understand their meaning" and that "this is especially the case for a penal code, which concerns a great number of citizens even among the popular classes", who he said "must be given a way to know, without the need for interpreters, what the code prohibits". Zanardelli believed that criminal law must never forget the rights of man and of the citizen and that it should not consider a criminal to be fundamentally incorrigible. According to him, it was not enough to simply intimidate and to restrain, and it was also necessary to correct and educate.

== Features ==
The Zanardelli Code came into force on 1 January 1890, although it was unanimously approved by both chambers of the Parliament of the Kingdom of Italy on 30 June 1889. The code abolished the death penalty (which was still in effect in the main European states) for all crimes, with the exception of certain military crimes committed in times of war. The code also granted a limited right to strike, and it introduced parole, the principle of punishment as rehabilitation, judicial discretion, and certified mental illness as a reason to be exempt from trial through an insanity defence.

== Replacement and repeal ==
When the Italian fascist leader Benito Mussolini came into power in 1922, many of the Zanardelli Code's regulations were effectively ignored. In 1930, the Zanardelli Code was formally replaced by the Rocco Code, named after the then Minister of Justice Alfredo Rocco. After the fall of the fascist regime in Italy, which became a constitutional republic in 1946, there was a tension between restoring the more liberal Zanardelli Code and adapting it to modern times and keeping the Rocco Code; despite its authoritarianism, the Rocco Code was more scientifically advanced than the Zanardelli Code. Moreover, the Rocco Code abided by the principle of ex post facto. In the end, the Rocco Code remained in effect, with its more authoritarian parts expunged. A new Italian Code of Criminal Procedure was passed in 1988, and the Zanardelli Code was officially repealed in its entirety in December 2010.

== Other uses ==
Although the Zanardelli Code has not been in effect in Italy since 1930, it is still the main source for criminal law in Vatican City, which adopted it after the Lateran Treaty of 1929, along with all other Italian legislation in effect at the time. In cases concerning more recent crimes, such as selling psychoactive drugs, the Vatican has referenced other sources in their legal system and has reformed the code many times over the years. In addition, the Turkish Penal Code of 1926, which replaced the 19th-century Ottoman version that was partially modelled on the Napoleonic Code, was based in part on the Zanardelli Code. A notable exception was its inclusion of the death penalty (which would not be abolished in Turkey until 2004). It was replaced by the Turkish Penal Code in 2005.

== See also ==
- Savoy Penal Code
- Tuscan Penal Code of 1853
