= Code of Offences and Penalties =

The Code of Offences and Penalties (French: Code des délits et des peines) was a criminal code adopted in revolutionary France by the National Convention on 25 October 1795 (the 3rd of Brumaire of the year IV under the French Republican Calendar).

With 646 articles, the code deals with judicial organization, criminal procedure, and criminal punishment. It distinguishes between the functions of administrative police, which is concerned with the prevention of crimes and offenses, and judicial police, which is concerned with the investigation of crimes and identification of suspects. This distinction is still in force today and is a functional distinction, which does not necessarily imply an organizational separation: a single organization may be charged with carrying out both types of police functions: one example is the National Gendarmerie.

The code is notable for abandoning corporal (afflictive) penalties, with the exception of the death penalty, including for espionage.

The Code was also distinguished by creating prison sentences, the harshest of which is known as the peine de la gêne, and consists of a fifty-year imprisonment in a windowless cell without any possibility of communication with either outside persons or inmates.

== See also ==
- French criminal law

Preceded by Penal Code of 1791	Penal code of France; 1795–1810	Succeeded by Penal Code of 1810
