= French Penal Code of 1791 =

French Revolution-era penal code

The French Penal Code of 1791 was a penal code adopted during the French Revolution by the Constituent Assembly, between 25 September and 6 October 1791. It was France's first penal code, and was influenced by the Enlightenment thinking of Montesquieu and Cesare Beccaria.

== General presentation ==
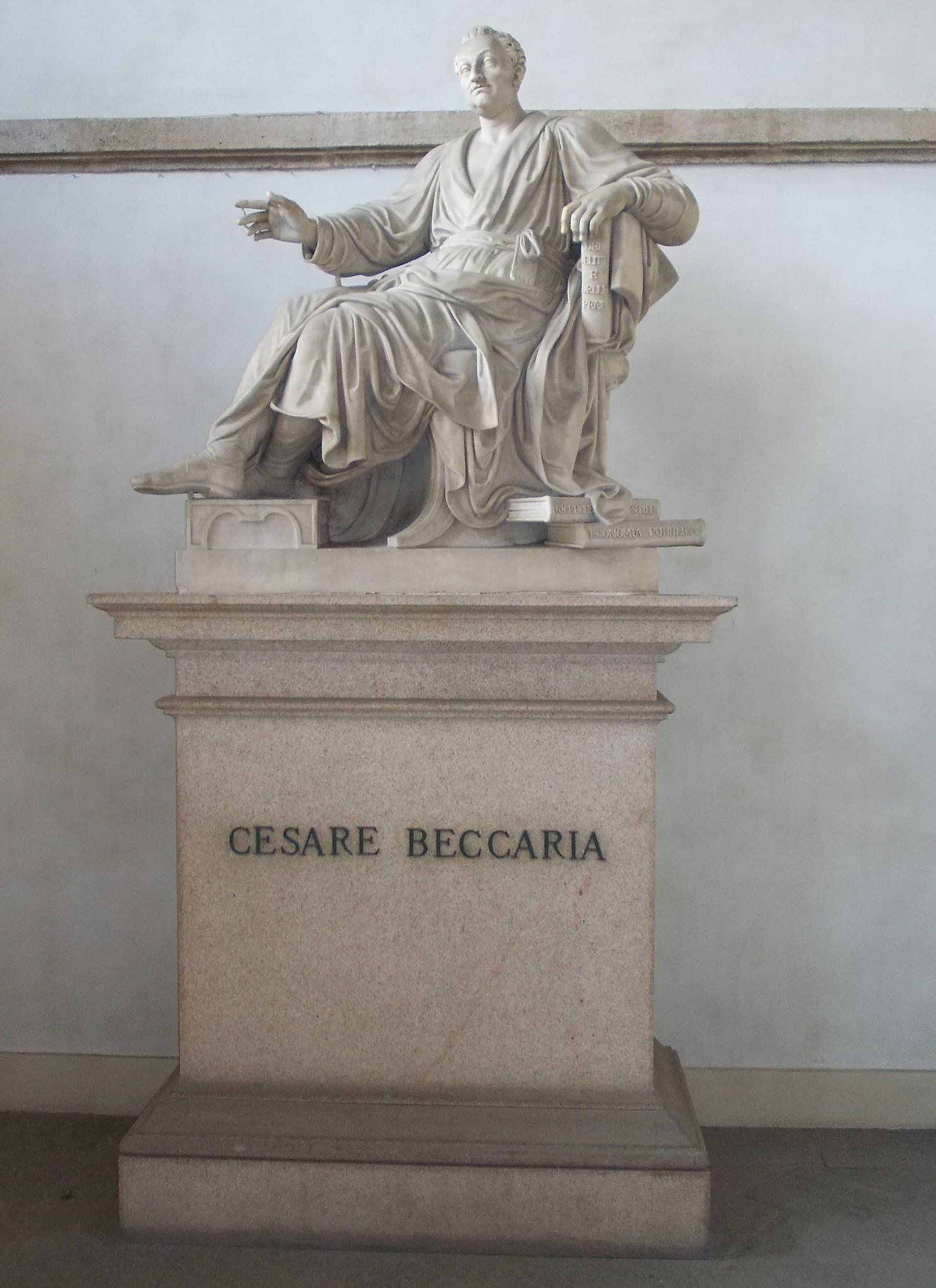
Statue of Cesare Beccaria in Pinacoteca Brera, Milan

The principle of legality was a key philosophical foundation of the 1791 Code. This principle holds that no one may be convicted of a criminal offense unless a previously published legal text sets out in clear and precise wording the constituent elements of the offense and the penalty which applies to it. In the spirit of the 1789 Declaration of the Rights of Man and of the Citizen, Cesare, Marquis of Beccaria summarized the principles that were to be the foundation of the procedural system. In his words, "Only laws can determine the penalties that correspond to offenses. This power can only be held by the legislator, who represents the whole of society united in the social contract." This was part of revolutionary ideology and set up against the 'arbitrary' or obscure, regionally differentiated systems of laws and punishments which had evolved under the ancien régime. The Code of 1791 was intended to be straightforward and 'clear', leaving little room for the interpretation of the judge. It was based on the belief that it is possible to assemble abstract legal norms that can be applied to the facts of a particular case in order to reach a single, definitive outcome. The goal was to make the judicial outcome 'predictable' given a particular situation.

The adoption of the 1791 Code effectively repealed all previous criminal ordinances and royal edicts relating to criminal matters. The Code was an important influence on the Napoleonic Penal Code of 1810, which replaced it.

== Crimes and punishments under the Code ==
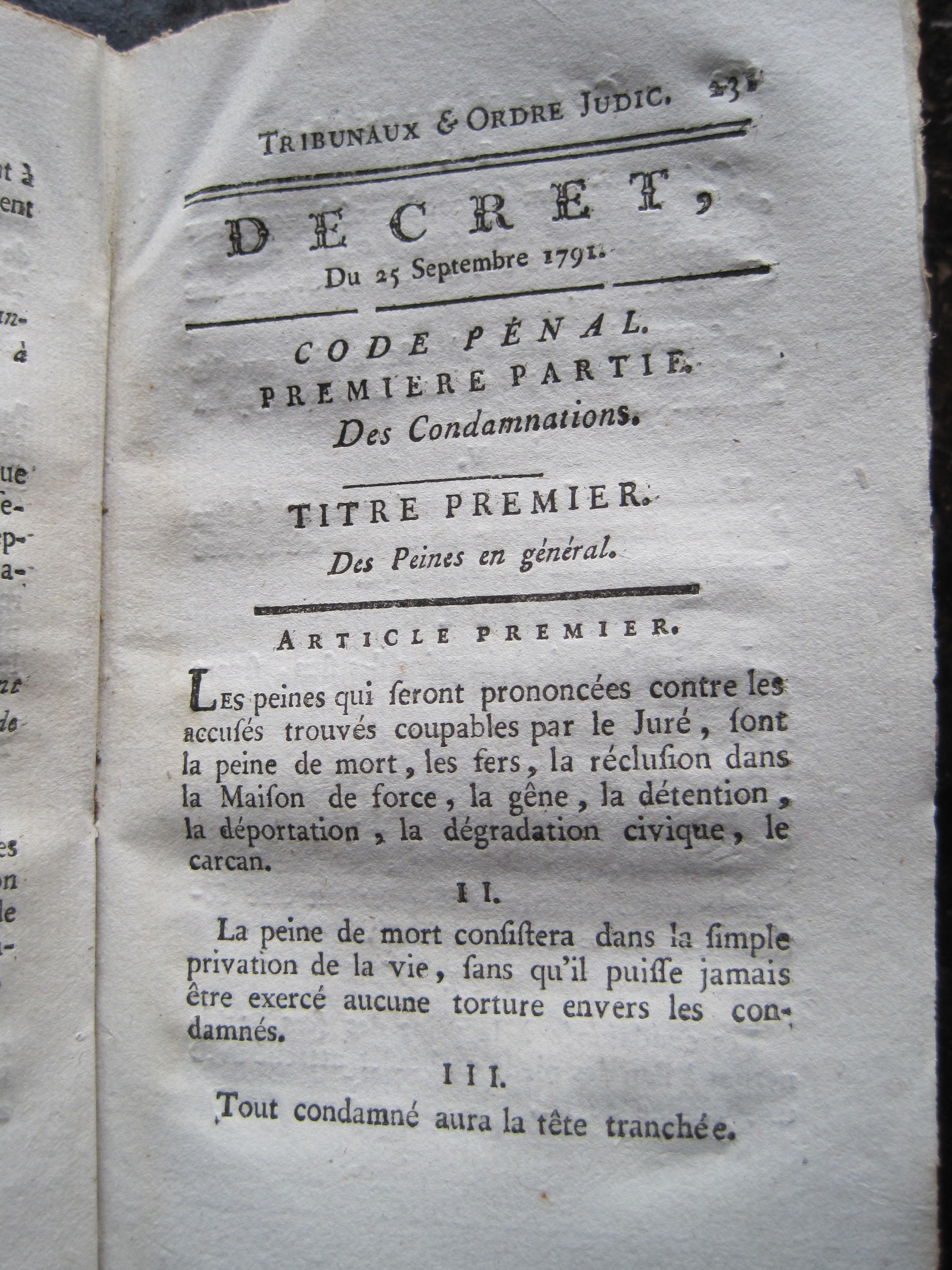

Articles 1–3 of the Code of 1791

Under the Penal Code of 1791, punishments were ranked by order of severity as follows:

- death; execution was to take the form of decapitation, but was limited to the simple deprivation of life, without torture of the condemned (Title I, Articles 2 and 3);
- hard labor in chains (les fers) was authorized, but could never be applied as a life sentence; for women and girls, the sentence was "confinement in a house of correction") (Title I, Articles 8 and 9);
- confinement (la gêne), for a maximum of 20 years; communication with other prisoners or with visitors was not allowed (Title I, Articles 13 and 14);
- detention, for a maximum of 6 years.

These punishments deprived the individual of all the rights attached to the status of active citizen, a form of civic disenfranchisement that lasted until rehabilitation (Title IV, Art. 1).

Following these punishments came banishment, which was classified an infamous but not afflictive punishment.

The Code also introduced the concept of involuntary manslaughter (Title II, Article 1), which precluded any criminal conviction, while still allowing for the award of civil damages (Title II, Article 2). Similarly, legitimate self-defense exempted a person from any criminal conviction in the case of a homicide.

The Code distinguished between murder (homicide without premeditation) and assassination (premeditated homicide). Rape was punished by six years of hard labor (Title II, Article 29). Article 32 imposed a sentence of twelve years of hard labor on anyone who had "intentionally destroyed the proof of a person's civil status".

A sentence of 24 years of hard labor was applicable in cases such as violent theft committed under aggravating circumstances (Title II, Article 5).

Regarding abortion, the Code criminalized the abortionist, punishable by "twenty years in irons", but not the women who had recourse to it (Title II, Article 17).

Life imprisonment and branding with a hot iron (a fleur-de-lis under the ancien régime) were both abolished by the Penal Code of 1791, but were later reintroduced in the Penal Code of 1810.

The Code made France the first European country to effectively legalize sodomy by simply ignoring it. Thus, the 1791 Code was the first Western code of law to decriminalize such conduct since classical antiquity. Its sponsor, Louis-Michel le Peletier, presented it to the Constituent Assembly saying that it only punished 'true crimes', not the artificial offenses condemned by 'superstition'.

== See also ==
- French criminal law

Preceded by Not codified, see Ancien Régime	Penal code of France; 1791–1795	Succeeded by Code of Offences and Penalties
