= Tuscan Penal Code of 1853 =

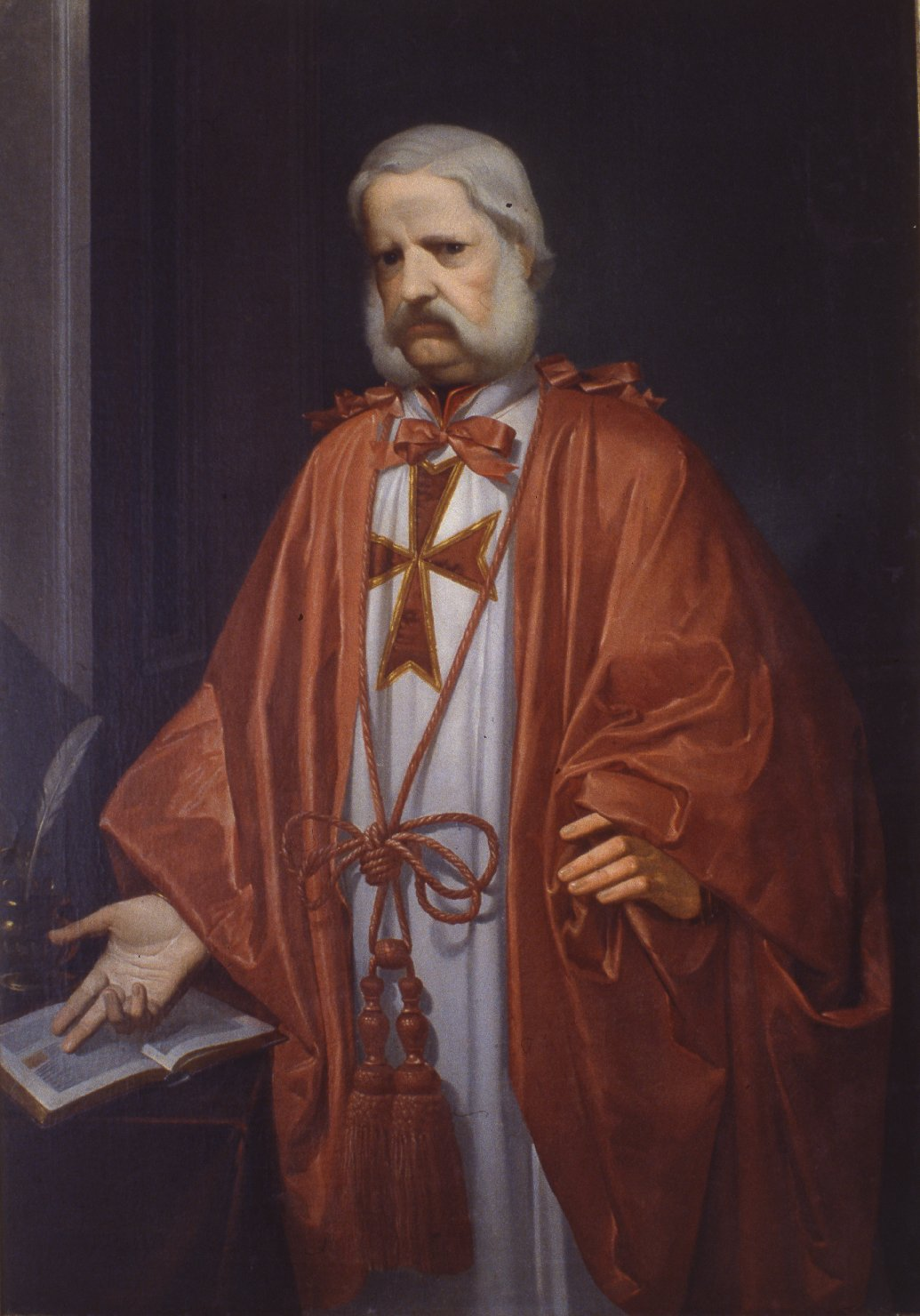
Grand Duke Leopoldo II, 1858 or 1859

The Tuscan Penal Code of 1853 was the criminal code of the Grand Duchy of Tuscany promulgated by Grand Duke Leopold II of Tuscany in 1853, and in force even after the unification of Italy, until it was replaced by the Zanardelli Code of 1889.

It replaced the previous Leopoldine Code of 1786.

== Background ==
The relatively liberal political climate in Tuscany allowed for the development of a distinctive school of legal thought. Thus the 1853 code was informed by works such as the Scritti germanici di diritto criminale by Francescantonio Mori and the Programma del corso di diritto criminale by Francesco Carrara at the University of Pisa. While Napoleonic law dominated legal theory in much of Italy, the law of the Grand Duchy of Baden was more commonly used as a model in the Grand Duchy. Unusually, under the 1853 code all crimes were considered as a single category, whereas Austrian legal theory divided crimes in to ordinary and political categories, while French criminal law French jurisprudence classified crimes into crimes, misdemeanors, and contraventions. (Tuscany regulated contraventions in a separate law issued the same year).

== General description ==
The code included 456 articles divided into two books, On crimes and their punishment in general and On crimes and their punishment in particular.

The first book included nine titles and the second of eight:

- Crimes against the internal and external security of the State
- Crimes against the religion of the State
- Crimes against the administration of the State
- Crimes against public order
- Crimes of fraud or dishonesty involving public standards
- Crimes against modesty and family order
- Crimes against persons
- Crimes against property

== Contents ==
The 1853 code reintroduced the death penalty even though the Grand Duchy of Tuscany had been the first European state to abolish it, with the Leopoldine Code of 1786. Capital punishment was abolished again in 1859 by the provisional Tuscan government, shortly before the annexation of Tuscany to the nascent Kingdom of Italy.

The Code defined prison sentences for other crimes; on June 20, 1853, a prison regulation was also issued, which saw punishment as a means of re-education of the offender. The code was one of the first in Europe to recognize strikes as legal, so long as strikers did not engage in violence. Penalties for political crimes, counterfeiting of money and infanticide were reduced. The crime of Lèse-majesté was not included in the code. One relatively novel provision in the code was the criminalization of failure to carry out an easy rescue (where a vulnerable person was in clear danger and the individual ran no serious risk by intervening to help them).

== Replacement ==
Overall, the Tuscan Code was in line with the most advanced trends of the time in the field of penal law. For this reason, after the unification of Italy there was uncertainty about which criminal code to adopt for the new Kingdom of Italy. The three main codes in force immediately before unification were the Savoy Code of 1839 (updated in 1859 and used in Sardinia), the Bourbon Code of 1819 (used in the Two Sicilies) or the Tuscan Code, the only one that, by the time if unification, had abolished the death penalty.

In the end it was decided to leave the 1853 Code in force only in Tuscany, while in the rest of Italy the Savoy Code was introduced, with some provisions adapted from the Bourbon code applied in the southern territories. This transitional arrangement lasted until 1889, when the Zanardelli Code - in which the Tuscan code of 1853 was an important influence - came into force throughout Italy and the Tuscan penal code of 1853 was finally abolished.
