= Presidency of Nicolas Sarkozy =

French presidency

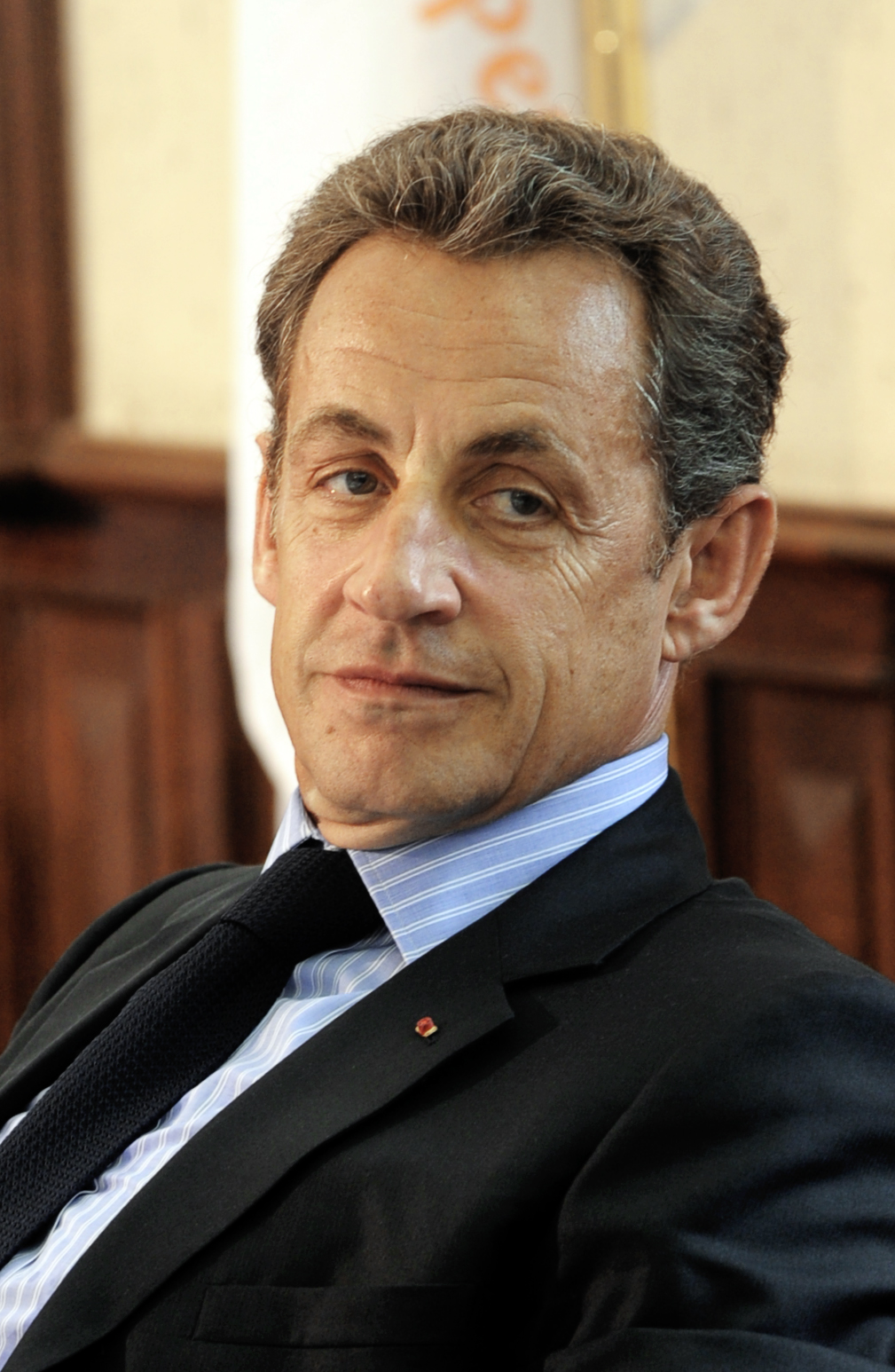
- Sarkozy in 2010
- Presidency of Nicolas Sarkozy; 16 May 2007 – 15 May 2012
- Cabinet: First Fillon government; Second Fillon government; Third Fillon government
- Party: UMP
- Election: 2007
- Seat: Élysée Palace
- Standard of the President

The presidency of Nicolas Sarkozy began on 16 May 2007 when Nicolas Sarkozy became the sixth President of the French Fifth Republic, following his victory in the 2007 presidential election. A candidate of the conservative Union for a Popular Movement (UMP), he nominated François Fillon as Prime minister, who formed a composite government, a bit modified following the UMP's relative victory during the June legislative election. Although the UMP had not obtained a majority as large as expected, Nicolas Sarkozy could launch the reforms he had pledged as a candidate as soon as he was elected. However, he tried to open his government to the opposition party, appointing several politicians close to the opposition parties.

With the quinquennat reform of 2000, the president of the republic has a five-year term to lead freely the domestic policy he wants, if ever he obtains the majority at the legislative election, which is very likely to occur. Traditionally, according to the Constitution of the French Fifth Republic, the main role of the President of the Republic is to determine the foreign policy of the nation, while the Prime Minister is entrusted with leading the domestic policy. However, as François Fillon was politically very close to the President, Nicolas Sarkozy could be very active both in foreign relations and in domestic reforms. French journalists have called him a "hyper-président", to insist on his will to solve many important problems and his omnipresence in all domains. Some media even compared him with Napoléon Bonaparte and Louis XIV to refer to his will to control and change everything. While the popularity of the president was very high at the beginning of his mandate, it rapidly declined during the first months of his mandate, and the government faced several protests.

The presidency of Nicolas Sarkozy was marked by the 2008 financial crisis and the Great Recession. As President-in-Office of the European Council during the last six months of 2008, and as the president of a member country of the G-8 and the G-20, Nicolas Sarkozy was very much involved in the international debates and propositions to fight against the crisis. He had also to cope with the economic and social effects of the crisis in France. In particular, he had to renounce to reduce the public deficit as he had promised, and instead he had to launch a stimulus package, as part of the 2008 European Union stimulus plan, to limit social discontentment. As he had promised to reach full-employment and to boost the economic growth, he faced growing protest. In the 2012 presidential elections, Sarkozy was defeated by Socialist François Hollande by a margin of 3.2%.

== Transfer of power ==
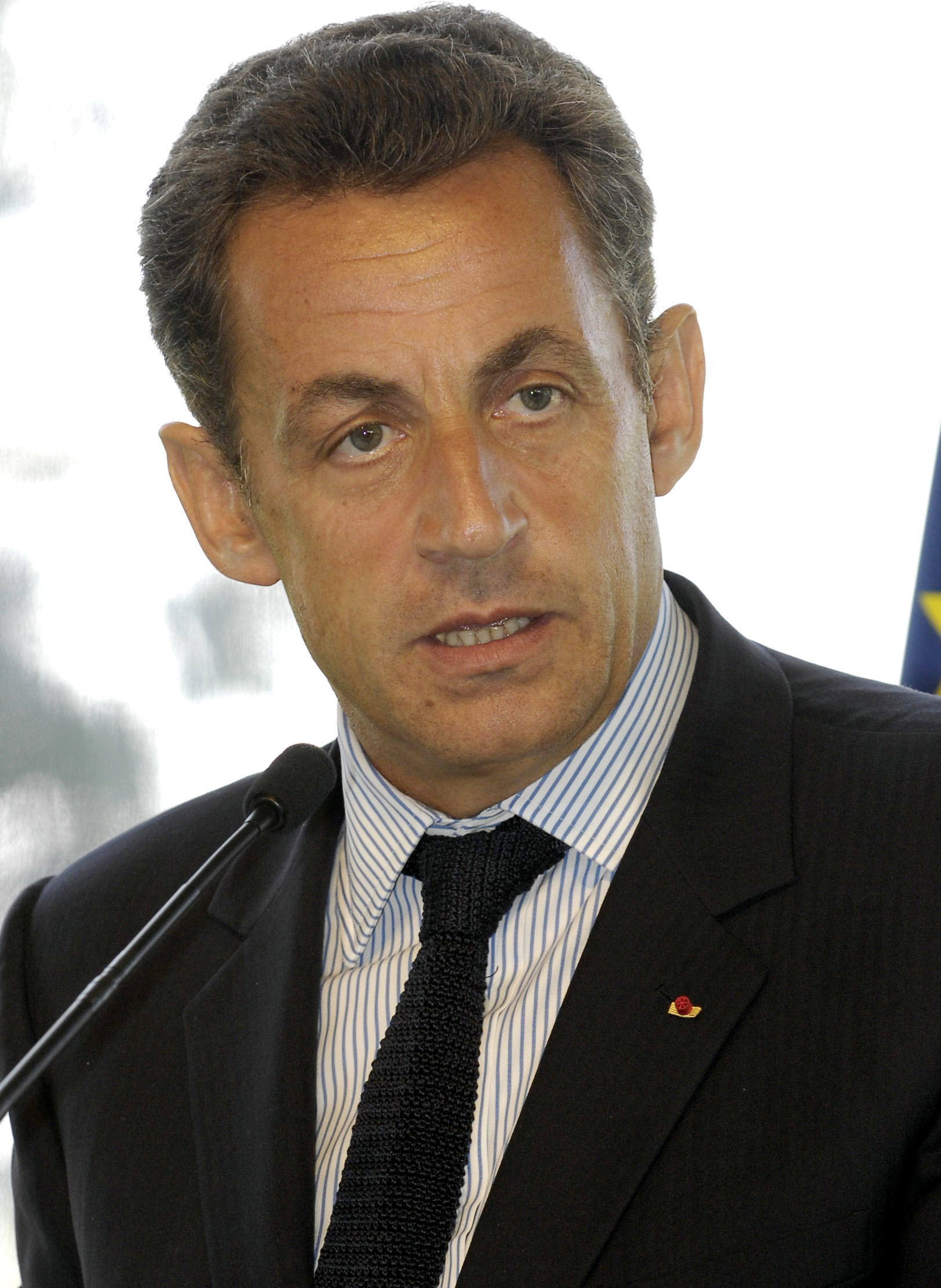
President Sarkozy in 2007

Nicolas Sarkozy was elected president on 6 May 2007, but the official transmission of power took place ten days after. In this period of time, he could not exercise his power nor begin appointing a government. Between 7 and 9 May, he left on holidays with his family off Malta on board a yacht lent by a friend of M.Sarkozy's, Vincent Bolloré. This trip gave rise to some criticism in the media, because Vincent Bolloré was the chairman of the Bolloré Group, one of the biggest and most powerful French conglomerates. However, a poll showed that a majority of people found that this trip was not shocking.

The official transfer of power from Jacques Chirac took place on 16 May at 11:00 am (9:00 UTC) at the Élysée Palace, where Nicolas Sarkozy was given the nuclear codes of the French nuclear arsenal and presented with the Grand Master's Collar, symbol of his new function of Grand Master of the Legion of Honour. At that point, he formally became president. Leyenda, by Spanish composer Isaac Albéniz was played in honour of the president's wife. Both Sarkozy's mother Andrée, and his formerly estranged father Pal – with whom Sarkozy had reached a reconciliation – attended the ceremony, as did Sarkozy's children. The presidential motorcade then travelled from the Élysée to the Champs-Élysées for a public ceremony at the Arc de Triomphe. Then the new president went to the Cascade du Bois de Boulogne of Paris for a homage to the French Resistance and to the Communist resistant Guy Moquet – he proposed that all high-school students read Guy Moquet's last letter to his parents, which was criticized by a number of leftists as a cynical form of reappropriation of French history by the right.

In the afternoon, the new president flew to Berlin to meet with German Chancellor Angela Merkel.

== Appointment of the government ==
Prime Minister Dominique de Villepin was replaced by François Fillon on 17 May. Sarkozy appointed Bernard Kouchner, the left-wing founder of Médecins Sans Frontières, as his foreign minister, leading to Kouchner's expulsion from the Socialist Party. In addition to Kouchner, three more Sarkozy ministers are from the left, including Eric Besson, who served as Ségolène Royal's economic adviser at the beginning of her campaign. Sarkozy also appointed seven women to form a total cabinet of 15; one, Justice Minister Rachida Dati, is the first woman of Northern African origin to serve in a French cabinet. Of the 15, only two attended the elite École nationale d'administration (ENA) . The ministers were reorganized, with the controversial creation of a Ministry of Immigration, Integration, National Identity and Co-Development – given to his right-hand man Brice Hortefeux – and of a Ministry of Budget, Public Accounts and Civil Administration – handed out to Éric Wœrth, supposed to prepare the replacement of only a third of all civil servants who retire.

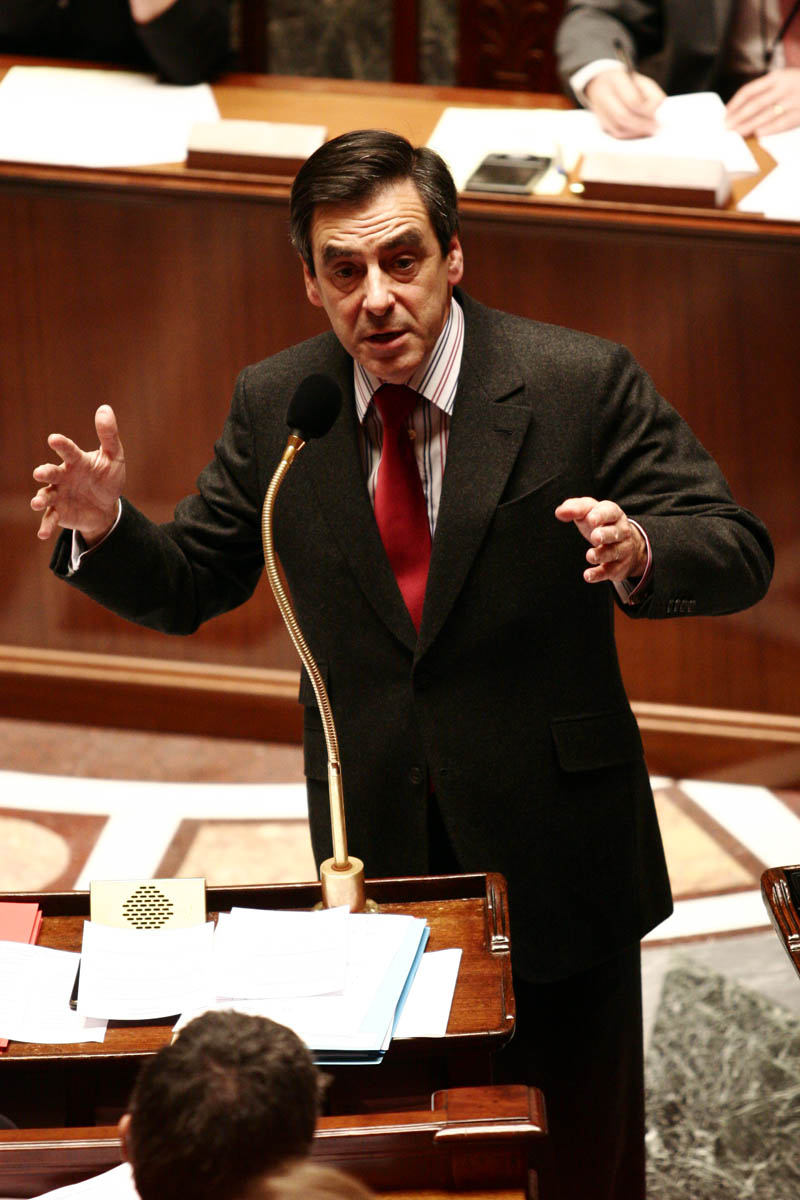
François Fillon has been the Prime Minister of Nicolas Sarkozy since the beginning of his presidential mandate.

The UMP, Sarkozy's party, won a majority at the June 2007 legislative election, although by less than expected. The presidential party only gained 318 seats out of 577.

=== First reforms ===
In July, the UMP majority, seconded by the Nouveau Centre, approved one of Sarkozy's electoral promise, which was to quasi-suppress the inheritance tax. The inheritance tax used to bring eight billion euros into state coffers. This reform was included in a fiscal stimulus package that allegedly aimed at reviving the economic growth. However, the TEPA Law, another measure of the stimulus package, sparked a polemic because it seemed to favour richest households through tax cuts.

Furthermore, Sarkozy cut with the custom of amnestying traffic tickets and of releasing some prisoners from overcrowded jails on Bastille Day, a tradition that Napoleon had started in 1802 to commemorate the storming of the Bastille during the French Revolution

Fillon's government issued a decree on 7 August 2007 to generalize a voluntary biometric profiling program of travellers in airports. The program, called Parafes, was to use fingerprints. The new database would be interconnected with the Schengen Information System (SIS) as well as with a national database of wanted persons (Fichier des personnes recherchées, FPR). The CNIL protested against this new decree, opposing itself to the recording of fingerprints and to the interconnection between the SIS and the FPR.

In November 2007, Sarkozy faced his first domestic test when workers from the public sector struck to protest his domestic reform policies. At the same time, there were also the university protests in response to a polemical law supported by the UMP, MoDem and Nouveau Centre that reforms the university system in France. The first debates on the reform of French health care system were also tough.

== First international actions ==
Shortly after taking office, President Sarkozy began negotiations with Colombian president Álvaro Uribe and the left-wing guerrilla FARC, regarding the release of hostages held by the rebel group, especially Franco-Colombian politician Ingrid Betancourt. According to some sources, Sarkozy himself asked for Uribe to release FARC's "chancellor" Rodrigo Granda.

=== Release of Bulgarian nurses ===
During his investiture speech as President beginning of May 2007, Sarkozy had alluded to the Bulgarian nurses detained in Libya, declaring: "France will be to the sides of the Libyan nurses [sic] detained for 8 years..."

He announced on 24 July 2007, that French and European representatives had obtained the extradition of the Bulgarian nurses detained in Libya to their country. In exchange, he signed with Gaddafi security, health care and immigration pacts – and a $230 million (168 million euros) MILAN antitank missile sale. The contract was the first made by Libya since 2004, and was negotiated with MBDA, a subsidiary of EADS. Another 128 million euro contract would have been signed, according to Tripoli, with EADS for a TETRA radio system. The Socialist Party (PS) and the Communist Party (PCF) criticized a "state affair" and a "barter" with a "Rogue state". The leader of the PS, François Hollande, requested the opening of a parliamentary investigation.

Additionally, President Sarkozy pledged to sell Libya three civil nuclear power stations as part of a package of trade and assistance that will boost the role of French companies in the oil-rich country. During his visit to Libya on 25 July 2007, Sarkozy signed an agreement of cooperation on civil nuclear technology. He decided to build three civil nuclear power stations to the Libyan state. According to Paris, the nuclear power stations are meant for desalinization of sea water, but Le Monde has pointed out that the Libyans quickly bypassed any reference to desalinization. This deal was criticized by the French left-wing and also by German governmental sources, including Deputy Foreign Minister Gernot Erler, Greens leader Reinhard Buetikofer and SPD deputy Ulrich Kelber. And during Tony Blair's visit end of May 2007, the British group BP signed a natural gas contract for 900 million dollars.

Furthermore, Le Parisien alleged on 13 August 2007 that the agreement concerning nuclear technologies did not concern desalinization of sea water, but focused on particular on the ERP third-generation nuclear reactor, of a worth of $3 billion. The Parisian newspaper cited Philippe Delaune, the deputy of the deputy director of international affairs of the CEA atomic agency, which is the main share-holder of Areva, the firm which products ERP reactors. Although the French President denied any relationship between the deal with Areva and the liberation of the Six, Le Parisien points out a troubling chronology: Areva was called to present its products to Libya end of June 2007, a short time before the release of the Six. The French Socialist Party, through the voice of Jean-Louis Bianco, declared that this deal was "geopolitically irresponsible". The German government also denounced the agreement. Through Siemens, they detain 34% of the shares of Areva's subsidiary in charge of building the ERP (Areva NP).

These informations from Le Parisien were immediately denied by Areva. Areva's spokesman did admit that negotiations had taken place early June 2007, but that no particular technology transfer had been agreed upon. Furthermore, Philippe Delaune, the CEA's spokesman, added that in any case, any transfer concerning the ERP technology would take at least ten or fifteen years.

While Areva did admit that general negotiations had taken place, Nicolas Sarkozy formally dismissed all of the story, claiming it was "false". Bulgarian President Georgi Parvanov also claimed that the arms and nuclear agreements were not related to the release of the nurses.

=== African speech ===
On 27 July 2007, Sarkozy delivered a speech in Senegal, written by Henri Guaino, in which he made reference to "African peasants" (note that the French word "paysans" can be translated as either "peasants" or as "rural people") and said that colonialism was not the cause of all of Africa's problems, France made mistakes in Africa though "did not exploit anyone", and asked young Africans to fight against corruption and violence.

The tragedy of Africa is that the African has never really entered into history... They have never really launched themselves into the future... The African peasant, who for thousands of years has lived according to the seasons, whose life ideal was to be in harmony with nature, only knew the eternal renewal of time... In this imaginary world, where everything starts over and over again, there is room neither for human endeavour, nor for the idea of progress... The problem of Africa... is to be found here. Africa's challenge is to enter to a greater extent into history... It is to realise that the golden age that Africa is forever recalling will not return, because it has never existed.

— Sarkozy, at a speech in Senegal

The remarks were widely condemned by African intellectuals; many, such as Achille Mbembe, Mamadou Diouf or Ibrahima Thioub, viewed them not only as racist, but as displaying a deep ignorance by Sarkozy of African studies, wondering how it was possible to hold similar discourses in 2008. Alpha Oumar Konare, head of the African Union commission, said "This speech was not the kind of break we were hoping for... It reminded us of another age, especially his comments about peasants." Other criticism was levelled at Sarkozy's failure to acknowledge the previous role of France in propping up abusive regimes. The French government defended Sarkozy's speech, saying that he also criticised the economics of globalisation and proposed a partnership to help Africa confront it. Konare's wife Adame Ba Konare also started a movement of promotion of African History following Sarkozy's speech.

South African president Thabo Mbeki praised Sarkozy's speech and called him a "citizen of Africa", which raised criticism by some in the South African media.

=== Religion ===
In 2004, Nicolas Sarkozy published a book called La République, les religions, l'espérance ("The Republic, Religions, and Hope"), in which he argued that the young should not be brought up solely on secular or republican values. He also advocated reducing the separation of church and state, arguing for the government subsidy of mosques in order to encourage Islamic integration into French society. He flatly opposes financing of religious institutions with funds from outside France. After meeting with Tom Cruise, Sarkozy was criticised by some for meeting with a member of the Church of Scientology, which is classified as a cult (secte translates "cult") in France (see Parliamentary Commission on Cults in France). Sarkozy stated that "the roots of France are essentially Christian" at a speech in Rome in December 2007. He also called Islam as "one of the greatest and most beautiful civilizations the world has known" at a speech in Riyadh in January 2008. Both comments drew criticism.

Sarkozy visited Pope Benedict XVI on 20 December 2007, and formally received the title of Honorary Chanoine of the Basilica of St. John Lateran, which is automatically conferred to each French President. On his visit to the Pope, Sarkozy was accompanied by French comedian Jean-Marie Bigard, was late, and text-messaged during the audience. This behaviour has led some people to advance that he is not cultured enough to be in office.

=== August 2007 vacations ===
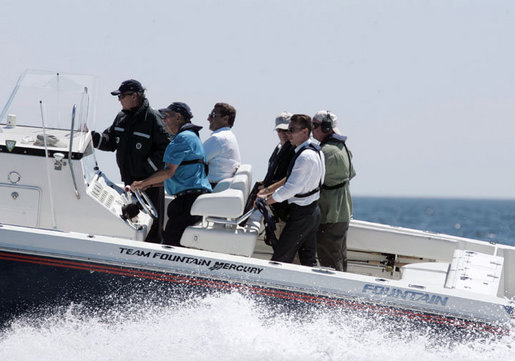
U.S. President George W. Bush and Sarkozy

Sarkozy then went in vacation to the United States, taking his family to Lake Winnipesaukee in New Hampshire. He was expected to stay in the 11-bathroom shorefront mansion of former Microsoft executive Michael Appe. However, he interrupted his vacation for a one-day trip to France after the death of Cardinal Lustiger, former archbishop of Paris, whose funeral he was to attend. A presidential plane flew him on 10 August to Paris and then back to America. He visited President George W. Bush in Kennebunkport, Maine, and returned to France by commercial jet on 21 August.

=== Gaddafi's visit ===
From 10 to 15 December, Libya's leader Muammar Gaddafi visited Paris. It was a polemical official trip. The Secretary of Human Rights, Rama Yade, argued that it was not acceptable for France to receive on its territory a man that did not respect human rights. Foreign Affairs Ministry Bernard Kouchner supported her and did not meet Gaddafi.

=== Personal life ===
Nicolas Sarkozy was also much criticised at the beginning of 2008, with his divorce and then with his remarriage with singer and ex-model Carla Bruni in January 2008. Indeed, he appeared as over-mediatised and omnipresent, and criticism of hyperpresidency were common. In February 2008, at the annual Salon of Agriculture, Sarkozy declared "Casse toi pauv’con !" (which can be translated as "beat it, you poor twat"), to a visitor that had refused to shake his hand. He was much criticised for this episode.

As his personal popularity was decreasing very rapidly since his election, his party lost the local elections in March 2008.

== French local elections 2008 ==
Sarkozy's conservative party braced for a possible setback as voting got under way on 16 March 2008 local elections which was seen as the new conservative leader's first electoral test and a barometer of the strength of his Union for a Popular Movement-party, which was hoping to hang on Marseille and Toulouse. Ten months after his election, France's economy remained sluggish and Sarkozy had backed off from many of the sweeping reforms that he promised on the campaign trail. A UMP loss 16 March 2008 could weaken Sarkozy's bid to live up to his promises of economic, social and institutional reforms. The municipal elections coincide with a recent plunge in Sarkozy's popularity. His ratings steadily slipped in the wake of a series of angry public outbursts, a widely publicized divorce, and a quick courtship and marriage to former model and singer Carla Bruni.

The first round 2008 French municipal elections on 9 March 2008 gave the rival Socialist Party a lead: 47.5 percent of the vote compared with 44.4 percent for the UMP. The Socialist Party took over many cities from the UMP, a defeat for the presidential party and a sign of disapproval of the government.

== French Burka Ban ==
Europe Burqa bans (map current as of 2025): National ban – country bans women from wearing full-face veils in public Local ban – cities or regions ban full-face veils Partial ban – government bans full-face veils in some locations

In April 2011, France became the first European country to impose a ban on full-face veils in public areas.

The French Parliament began an initial inquiry on the issue shortly after President Nicolas Sarkozy stated in June 2009 that religious face veils were "not welcome" within France. Sarkozy had stated that the law is to protect women from being forced to cover their faces and to uphold France's secular values. A poll carried out by Pew Research Center leading up to the vote indicated that 80% of French voters supported the ban.

Fadela Amara, who had recently served as a junior minister in the French government and is a Muslim, had previously declared: "The veil is the visible symbol of the subjugation of women, and therefore has no place in the mixed, secular spaces of France's state school system."

The bill was passed by the National Assembly by a vote of 335–1. The sole vote against the ban in the National Assembly was cast by Daniel Garrigue, who warned that "to fight an extremist behavior, we risk slipping toward a totalitarian society." It was passed by the Senate by a vote of 246–1, with 100 abstentions.

== Foreign policy decisions ==
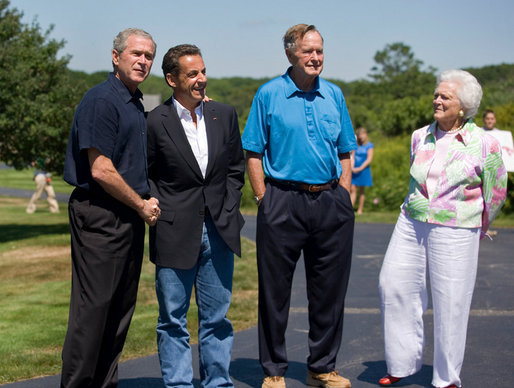
Nicolas Sarkozy with Presidents Bush (Senior and Junior)

=== NATO ===
Sarkozy tried to strengthen the ties with the United States after they had been loosened when Jacques Chirac decided not to take part in the Iraq War in 2003.

Sarkozy announced that France would send 1,000 additional troops to Afghanistan, it was reported 22 March 2008. He demonstrated his commitment to the NATO alliance's Afghan mission during his two-day visit to London, which started on 28 March 2008.

On 3 April 2008, during the Bucharest summit, Nicolas Sarkozy announced that France was likely to rejoin NATO's military structure (In 1966 France withdrew from NATO's command structure, but not from NATO overall), and confirmed that he would send more troops to Myanmar.

=== Arms sales ===
Sarkozy has used arms sales to court populous nonaligned nations and extend French influence.

=== Mediterranean Union ===
Sarkozy said 14 March 2008 he won "unanimous" backing for his plan to forge closer political ties with Europe's North African and Mideast neighbors on the Mediterranean. The agreement came at the end of the first day of a two-day EU summit.

=== Global warming ===
On 8 June 2007, during the 33rd G8 summit in Heiligendamm, Sarkozy set a goal of reducing French CO_{2} emissions by 50% by 2050 in order to prevent global warming. He then pushed forward the important Socialist figure of Dominique Strauss-Kahn as European nominee to the International Monetary Fund (IMF). Critics alleged that Sarkozy proposed to nominate Strauss-Kahn as managing director of the IMF to deprive the Socialist Party of one of its more popular figures.

=== The Libyan civil war ===
Sarkozy's government took an unexpected step regarding the 2011 Libyan civil war: after some initial confusion they supported the National Transitional Council, opposed to Muammar Gaddafi. The main negotiator on behalf of the Libyan people was Mahmoud Jibril. The influence of the philosopher Bernard-Henri Lévy, who visited Benghazi, was considered fundamental.

== European presidency ==
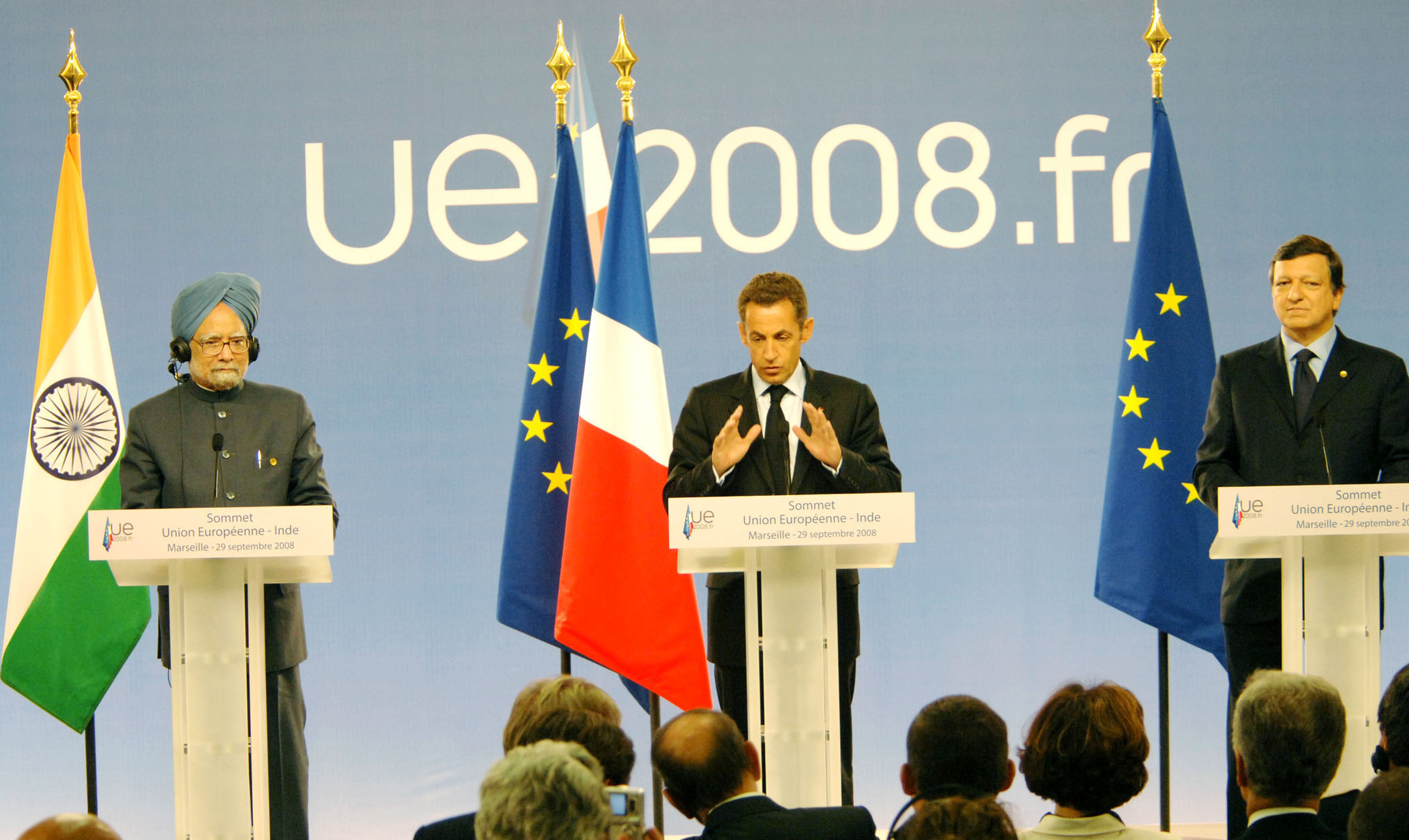
Sarkozy with President of the European Commission José Manuel Barroso and Indian Prime Minister Manmohan Singh with in EU–India Summit in Marseille on 29 September 2008

=== Internationals summits ===
President Sarkozy was present at the three G20 summits led in 2008 and 2009 in Washington, London, and Pittsburgh, and made various propositions. Before the London summit, he threatened not to attend it if other leaders did not promise to take decisive measures. He wanted all leaders to be committed to refound capitalism upon new bases and to introduce more morals in finance. He demanded that environmental concerns be at the center of G20 leaders' preoccupations. He also proposed to reduce the bonuses granted to traders and bankers.

=== Russo-Georgian War ===
During the 2008 South Ossetia war, Nicolas Sarkozy played a significant role, as he proposed a ceasefire to the conflict that was accepted by both the Russians and the Georgians.

== 2009 events ==
=== March 2009 visit to Mexico ===
Sarkozy travelled to Mexico in March 2009. He was hosted in Roberto Hernández Ramírez's hotel, El Tamarindo Beach and Golf Resort, a billionaire who has been accused of involvement in drug trade.

=== Overseas Protests ===
There were also protests from November 2008 to May 2009 in the French overseas territories because of the high cost of living there because there is a tax which means imports from France get a tariff added to them. This is combined with the high unemployment and lower salaries compared to Metropolitan France. They were started in Guadeloupe and spread to Martinique and Réunion.

== European elections ==
Despite the very low popularity of President Sarkozy, the UMP party largely won the European elections in May 2009.

== Main members of Sarkozy's staff ==
- General secretary – Claude Guéant
- Chief of the private military staff – Vice-amiral d'escadre Édouard Guillaud
- Special advisor to the President – Henri Guaino
- Advisors to the President – Raymond Soubie and Catherine Pégard
- Diplomatic advisor and sherpa – Jean-David Levitte
- Deputy secretary general – François Pérol
- Head of cabinet – Emmanuelle Mignon
- Advisors to the Presidency – Georges Marc Benamou, Arnold Munnich and Patrick Ouart
- Spokesman – David Martinon
- Head of cabinet – Cédric Goubet

== Opinion polling ==
Popularity polls

Sarkozy started with high polls, but they dropped significantly during the first reforms. He recovered during his European presidency and the reaction to the crisis, and stayed around 40% in approvals. However, after suspicions of nepotism (see Jean Sarkozy) and a slowdown in the french economy after an initial period of growth after the great recession, he lost more than 5 percent in confidence and never really recovered, bar during his reelection attempt. That scandal was later admitted to have been a crucial point by party officials, who noticed UMP membership dramatically fell. On the other side, right-wing discontent grew as National Front's new president Marine Le Pen launched an early campaign. Sarkozy's confidence ratings later fell to 30% in early 2010 and reached 20% in May 2011.

== See also ==
- Presidency of François Hollande
- Presidency of Emmanuel Macron
- Domestic policy of Nicolas Sarkozy
- Foreign policy of Nicolas Sarkozy
- Politics of France
- Foreign policy of France

French Presidential Administrations
Preceded by Jacques Chirac	Sarkozy Presidency; 2007–2012	Succeeded by François Hollande
