= Domestic policy of the Nicolas Sarkozy administration =

The domestic policy of the Nicolas Sarkozy administration was led by François Fillon's government as soon as Nicolas Sarkozy won the 2007 French presidential election and the government appointed by the president. According to the French constitution, the government and the Prime Minister "determine and conduct the policy of the nation", that is to say, deal with the domestic policy, while the President of the Republic focuses on foreign relations; however, a modification of the constitution in 2001 shortened the presidential mandate from seven to five years, so that the presidency lasts the same time as the government's mandate. Therefore, the president can be more implicated in the governmental policy. It was the case with Sarkozy, who has been accused of being a "hyper-president" by his opponents. François Fillon appeared as too much submitted to the president.

Sarkozy had promised during the presidential campaign many reforms. He announced the government would be very dynamic. He pledged to completely revamp the higher education system, to overhaul the judiciary system, judged as too ancient, to lead profound fiscal and economic reforms, and to revise the integration and social benefits system. He pledged to create ministries dedicated to the environment and to immigration and national identity. He also announced a complete reform of the health system, and various measures concerning culture.

== Timeline of events ==
=== First reforms ===
On 6 May 2007, Nicolas Sarkozy was elected President of the Republic of France at the second round of the presidential elections, with 53,06% of the votes. Few days later, on 18 May, he appointed François Fillon as Prime Minister. The first government comprised 15 ministers, 4 secretaries and one high commissary, but this government was to be transitional, because legislative elections were to be led. On 17 June, the UMP obtained the majority in the second round of the legislative elections, but less large than expected. The day after, a new government was therefore formed, with 15 ministers, 14 secretaries and 1 high commissary. Six members of the government come from the Socialist Party.

One week later, in the first Council of Ministers, the first bills were prepared. On 20 and 27 June, the Council of ministers began to prepare and examine the TEPA law, the General Review of Public Policies, and the reform of the judiciary map. Meanwhile, the government presented to "social representatives" a first draft on social negotiations and minimum service in transports. On 3 July, Prime Minister François Fillon presented to deputies of the National Assembly the broad lines of his domestic policy: modernization of institutions, social negotiations, reform of high school system, reform of the judiciary map, reform of the labour market, reform of the illness assurance, creation of a social TVA, policy on public debt. The Council of Ministers continued to examine bills pledged by Nicolas Sarkozy during the presidential campaign: bill on immigration and integration, LRU bill, draft on social negotiations. On 7 July, they plan the organization of the Grenelle Environment. In August, an extraordinary session of the Parliament allowed various laws to be enacted in a hurry: LRU law, law on recidivists, TEPA law (enacted after the Constitutional council modified it), law on social dialogue and minimum service in transport, adoption of the RSA (implemented for experimentation in November).

=== Preparation of major laws ===
Reforms continued to be prepared and examined after the summer holidays, with the creation of commissions, releasing of reports and discussions. Nicolas Sarkozy also prepared the pledged reform of secondary education and high school by writing to every teacher a « Letter to teachers » in which he recalled the missions and the values conveyed by school and teachers. He also created, soon after, a Commission for the evolution of the teacher job. On 7 September, a first round of negotiations between social representatives on the modernization of the labour market was launched. The Grenelle Environment lasted from September to October, and led to a plan designed by the Minister of the Environment Jean-Louis Borloo. The negotiations led to a first law, on GMOs. The reform of the judiciary system also began, but was subject to many debates. In November, the minister of Justice Rachida Dati unveil the reform of the judiciary map for the next three years, causing the discontentment of magistrates and judges. The reform began with a law on dangerous criminals (enacted in February 2008, after validation by the Constitutional Council). On 20 November, the law on immigration and integration was enacted after the constitutional council approved the possibility to resort to DNA tests, controversial point of the bill.

Major economical reforms were also underway, with the release of other major discussions were led to prepare two contradictory reports on social TVA, ordered by the President, the preparation on a law on competition on the sector of distribution, and a first budget bill for 2008 with a prevision growth between 2 and 2,5% and a 41,7 bn euros deficit, reduction of public debt to 64% of GDP, and suppression of 22 921 civil servants jobs. The budget bill for Social Security was also ambitious, with a reduction of the deficit to à 9 billion euros. On 30 August, a "Commission for the liberation of the French growth", presided by Jacques Attali, had been created. The commission was asked to release a report, ordered by the President, to revive the French economy. The Conseil d’orientation des retraites (COR) released a report stating the pension reform of 2003 did not allow improve the situation. It said the measures to improve employment of seniors failed. The preparation of the Grenelle Insertion, that would take place in May 2008, was also announced, in November. Finally, on 19 December, the government unveiled its plan for social reforms in 2008, including the reform of the labour market, of social negotiations, further training, and status of civil servants.

Reform of the central government and the institutions was also underway at the end of 2007, as part of the RGPP In September, the Home Minister announced the creation of a direction of domestic information, resulting from the merge between the direction of supervisory of the territory (DST) and the branch of the French police force dealing with political security (RG). In October, the minister du Budget officially announced the merger between the general direction of taxation (DGI) and the general direction of public accounts (DGCP). On 29 October, the "Comité on the modernization and rebalance of the institutions of the Fifth Republic", presided by Édouard Balladur, released a report, ordered by the President; it was to prepare a major reform of the constitution and of the parliamentarian system. Finally, the bill merging the ANPE and the UNEDIC/ASSEDIC was presented (enacted in February 2008).

However, at the end of the year 2007, political life was troubled by a growing contestation of certain groups strongly affected by some reforms. Between October and December, university students at the beginning of November, a growing discontentment of university students, protesting against the LRU law, led to two months of strikes and blockades. The movement also extended to high school students. On 28 November, the Prime Minister and the Minister of Higher Education Valérie Pécresse signed an agreement guaranteeing a 50% increase in the universities budget within five years. The agreement aimed at satisfying the students and putting an end to the movement. The reform of the judiciary map also caused a month of protestations of magistrates and judges, but the law was finally enacted on 27 December, despite the opposition of trade-unions. Economic reforms were also highly controversial. The Minister of Labour unveiled a controversial plan for the special retirement plan. The Minister proposed a deadline to trade unions to engage negotiations. Discussions open with RATP and SNCF, but national strikes are organized to oppose the law. In November, national negotiations between patronal organizations and trade unions on the modernization of the labour market. They fail to reach an agreement. In December negotiations on the special retirement plan continue, but failed.

=== 2008 reforms ===
At the beginning of 2008, various laws previously announced were voted by the Parliament and enacted: merger ANPE-Unedic, law on dangerous criminals, fusion DST-RG, implementation of the RGPP.

Preparations of other laws continued. On 11 January a third round of negotiations on the modernization of the labour market was led, with at last an agreement achieved and signed by the participants. A week after, discussions on social dialogue and representation of workers in companies were launched. Preparation of education reforms continued, with the "green book on the evolution of the teacher job" published. In February, the minister of Education presented the reform of education programs. Meanwhile, debates on the reform of the judiciary map engaged in February. The highly expected report by the Commission for the liberation of the French growth was published on 30 January. The expected plan "Espoir banlieues" was unveiled by the president.

The month February was marked by a strike of public television channels, protesting against the suppression of advertising on France Télévisions. A commission for the new public television was created to design the law. In March, negotiations on pensions between trade unions and patronal organizations, also with various strikes and demonstrations.

Following the regional and local elections in France, the government was modified on 18 March; however, the first cabinet underwent few changes, and that did not modify the reforms to be led. Soon after the cabinet change, the law on the modification of institutions was presented by the Prime Minister himself, and the law on the modernization of the labour market was at last voted and enacted, after several months of negotiations.

Meanwhile, various reforms were launched with publications of reports and creation of special commissions. In April, a report was released by the Commission Larcher, allowing debates on the reform of hospitals to be engaged. A commission to examine the reform of laws on minors delinquency was created by the Minister of Justice. A report to plan the modification of civil servants' statute was released.

May was dominated by debates on social reforms, amid various national demonstrations and strikes.

=== Fight against the crisis ===
The last months of 2008 were dominated by the fight against the financial and economic crisis. In October, the President unveiled plans to support the real-estate sector (purchase of 30.000 buildings by the government), the PME (French small-and-middle-sized companies), with 20 billion euros, and the written press, very affected by the crisis. The President himself launched on 2 October the General States of the Press to provide financial aids to newspapers. Financial help was also provided by the State to the banking sector. The government had to intervene jointly with Luxembourg and Belgium to save the ailing bank Fortis. The French government was committed with other European countries to recapitalize banks, and participated to the Eurogroup plan signed in October.

At the end of the year, the government also began to fight against the social effects of the crisis. On 28 October, the President unveiled to support employment, with significant aids by the government. On 20 November, Nicolas Sarkozy created the "Fonds stratégique d'investissement", a sovereignty fund with 20 billion euros to help French companies and banks fighting the crisis. The budget bill was revised down several times, with falling tax revenues, a growing deficit, and exploding debt. Finally, on 4 December, President Nicolas Sarkozy announced a 26 billion euros stimulus package to fight the economic crisis. The day after, Patrick Devedjian was appointed Minister of the economic revival. The 2009 budget bills were adopted at the very end of the year. The Social Security deficit amounts to 10,5 milliards euros, while the government deficit amounts to 66,986 billion euros, with a GDP growth prevision between 0,2% and 0,5%.

The necessity to fight against the crisis caused the rhythm of reforms to slow, especially economic reforms. However, laws previously planned in other fields were adopted: RSA (extension to the whole territory after a period of experimentation), enforcement of the modernization of the institutions, preparation of the law on regions, presentation of the law on the appointment of the President of Frances Television by the President of the Republic, plan for numerical television on the territory, preparation of the modification of laws on bioethics, and above all official presentation of the law on hospitals on 22 October.

The end of the year was also marked by the growing opposition to the government of university and school teachers. They led various strikes and demonstrations in November to protest against job cuts, the funding and management of research and teaching in university and higher education, and the modification of the statute of teachers.

=== French Burka Ban ===
Europe Burqa Bans. Map current as of 2025 National ban – country bans women from wearing full-face veils in public Local ban – cities or regions ban full-face veils Partial ban – government bans full-face veils in some locations

In April 2011, France became the first European country to impose a ban on full-face veils in public areas.

The French Parliament began an initial inquiry on the issue shortly after President Nicolas Sarkozy stated in June 2009 that religious face veils were "not welcome" within France. Sarkozy had stated that the law is to protect women from being forced to cover their faces and to uphold France's secular values. A poll carried out by Pew Research Center leading up to the vote indicated that 80% of French voters supported the ban.

Fadela Amara, who had recently served as a junior minister in the French government and is a Muslim, had previously declared: "The veil is the visible symbol of the subjugation of women, and therefore has no place in the mixed, secular spaces of France's state school system."

The bill was passed by the National Assembly by a vote of 335–1. The sole vote against the ban in the National Assembly was cast by Daniel Garrigue, who warned that "to fight an extremist behavior, we risk slipping toward a totalitarian society." It was passed by the Senate by a vote of 246–1, with 100 abstentions.

== Reforms ==
Institutions

Prime Minister François Fillon himself was asked to lead the announced reform of the constitution. The reform was held on article 49 of the text.

Economy

- Reform of extra-hours. The very polemical measure was included in a stimulus package with many other measures, voted in July 2007. With the reform, extra-hours are not submitted to contribution, i.e. taxes on salaries. With extra hours, workers can earn more. It is a means to cancel the effects of the 35 hours reform.
- 50% fiscal shield, included in the 2007 fiscal package.
- Suppression of inheritance tax, included in the 2007 fiscal package.
- Rules on great distribution.
- Stimulus package. This package was not a campaign pledge. To fight the economic crisis, Nicolas Sarkozy announced exceptional measures at the end of 2008. It included financial aids for PME.

Budget

- 50% reduction in public sector recruitment to replace retirees.
- Taxation direction and public compatibility merged.
- French General Review of Public Policies
- Reduction of the budget deficit. (Pledge not achieved due to the economic crisis.)
- Legislation of online gambling.
- Reform of the public function.

Education

- Reform of French universities, including the controversial LRU law.
- Complete reform of secondary education (delayed because of strong opposition by students and teachers).
- Abolition of 'The School Map'.

Justice

- Complete reform of the judiciary map.
- Reinforcement of sentences for multi-recidivists.
- Reinforcement of detention for dangerous criminals.
- Reform of the legislation on minors' delinquency. The former version of the law dated back to 1945.

Health

- Complete reform of the health care system, with the very polemical HPST law

Culture

- Hadopi law, on creation and internet.
- Suppression of advertising on state-owned TV channels.

Society

- Adoption of the RSA, following the Grenelle Insertion
- ANPE-ASSEDIC merged. The very expected merge between ANPE and ASSEDIC was at last fulfilled by the French government. The ANPE was a supervisory agency who registered unemployed people, while the Unedic and Assedics (local agencies affiliated to the Unedic) were agencies providing assistance and benefits to unemployed people. There were merged into the new agency Pôle emploi.

Environment

- Grenelle Environment
- Law on GMOs

== Popularity and protests ==
The popularity of the President and the Prime minister reached a climax at the beginning of their mandates.

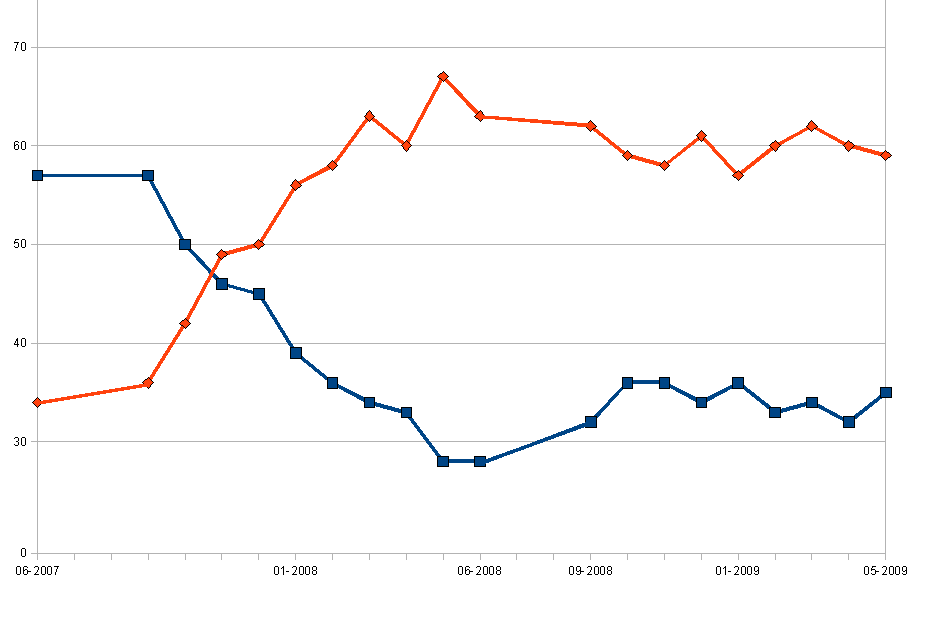
The decreasing popularity of the government was mainly due to the difficulty to fight against the economic crisis

Nicolas Sarkozy had a maximum popularity between August and October 2007: during this period, the number of people trusting him was higher than 55% according to BVA and CSA, higher than 60% for Ipsos, and reaching almost 65% for TNS Sofres. His popularity began to fall rapidly from October and November 2007. From February and June 2008, it maintained at very low levels, between 30 and 40 according to all opinions studies. In summer 2008, it rose again until the end of the year, when the popularity level was close to 50% (40% only for TNS Sofres). In 2009, it maintained between 40 and 45%.

The popularity of Francois Fillon was also very high at the beginning of his mandate, with more than 55% for CSA, TNS Sofres and Ipsos (45% only for BVA). It began to decrease slightly, but increase to reach a peak in April 2008 (49% for TNS Sofres, 51 for BVA, 55 for CSA, 59 for Ipsos). However, it fell again but stayed between 40 and 50% until the end of the year.
