= Jean-Pierre Hansen (CEO) =

Belgian corporate executive (born 1948)

Jean-Pierre, Baron Hansen (born 25 April 1948 in Athus, Belgium) is a Belgian corporate executive. He served as vice-chairman of the executive committee and senior executive vice-president of GDF-Suez, in charge of operations.

== Career ==
Jean-Pierre Hansen holds a master's degree in electrical engineering (University of Liège), a degree in economics (Panthéon-Assas University) and a PhD in engineering (Paris VI). He entered the electricity and gas sector in 1975.

He was CEO of Electrabel from 1992 to March 1999. Since January 2005, he has been vice-chairman and again CEO of Electrabel. Since March 1999, he has also held the position of chairman of the executive committee of Electrabel. He is also CEO of Suez-Tractebel, chairman of Fabricom and director of Distrigas, Fluxys, AGBAR (Spain) and ACEA (Italy), vice-chairman of the Federation of Enterprises in Belgium (FEB) and associate professor of economics at the Université catholique de Louvain (UCLouvain) and at the Ecole Polytechnique (Paris). He is also member of the board of directors of ArcelorMittal.

In 2008, Jean-Pierre Hansen and Patrick Ouart (now personal advisor for justice to French President Nicolas Sarkozy) have been recognized guilty by a Belgian court of "hacking". In February 2004, they tried to spy the telecommunications installation of an employee of Electrabel. The affair had then been called by the Belgian press the "Electragate" affair.
