= List of presidents of France =

The president of France is the head of state of France, elected by popular vote for five years.

The first officeholder is considered to be Louis-Napoléon Bonaparte, who was elected in 1848 but provoked the 1851 self-coup to later proclaim himself emperor as Napoleon III. His coup, which proved popular as he sought the restoration of universal male suffrage previously abolished by the legislature, granted the newly-established Second Empire firm ground.

A republican regime was given way again in 1870 through the Third Republic, after the fall of Napoleon III. A 1962 referendum held under the Fifth Republic at the request of President Charles de Gaulle transferred the election of the president of France from an electoral college to a popular vote. Since then, ten presidential elections have taken place. The 25th and current officeholder has been Emmanuel Macron since 14 May 2017.

== First Republic (1792–1804) ==
=== National Convention ===
The National Convention (20 September 1792 – 26 October 1795) was led by the President of the National Convention; the presidency rotated fortnightly.

From 1793 the National Convention was dominated by its Committee of Public Safety, in which the leading figures were Georges Danton and then Maximilien Robespierre.

=== Directory ===
The Directory was officially led by a president, as stipulated by Article 141 of the Constitution of the Year III. An entirely ceremonial post, the first president was Jean-François Rewbell, who was chosen by lot on 2 November 1795. The Directors conducted their elections privately, with the presidency rotating every three months. The last President was Louis-Jérôme Gohier.

The leading figure of the Directory was Paul Barras, the only director to serve throughout the entirety of the Directory’s existence.

Political parties

Centre (Thermidorians) Right-wing (Clichyens) Left-wing (Montagnards) Other (Maraisards)

Directors of the Directory (1 November 1795 – 10 November 1799)
Paul Barras; 2 November 1795 – 9 November 1799	Louis-Marie de la Révellière; 2 November 1795 – 18 June 1799 (Compelled to resign)	Jean-François Rewbell; 2 November 1795 – 16 May 1799 (Replaced by sortition)	Lazare Carnot; 2 November 1795 – 4 September 1797 (Proscribed and replaced after the Coup of 18 Fructidor)	Étienne-François Letourneur; 2 November 1795 – 20 May 1797
Paul Barras; 2 November 1795 – 9 November 1799	Louis-Marie de la Révellière; 2 November 1795 – 18 June 1799 (Compelled to resign)	Jean-François Rewbell; 2 November 1795 – 16 May 1799 (Replaced by sortition)	Lazare Carnot; 2 November 1795 – 4 September 1797 (Proscribed and replaced after the Coup of 18 Fructidor)	François Barthélemy; 20 May – 4 September 1797 (Proscribed and replaced after the Coup of 18 Fructidor)
Paul Barras; 2 November 1795 – 9 November 1799	Louis-Marie de la Révellière; 2 November 1795 – 18 June 1799 (Compelled to resign)	Jean-François Rewbell; 2 November 1795 – 16 May 1799 (Replaced by sortition)	Philippe Antoine Merlin; 4 September 1797 – 18 June 1799 (Compelled to resign)	François de Neufchâteau; 4 September 1797 – 15 May 1798 (Replaced by sortition)
Paul Barras; 2 November 1795 – 9 November 1799	Louis-Marie de la Révellière; 2 November 1795 – 18 June 1799 (Compelled to resign)	Jean-François Rewbell; 2 November 1795 – 16 May 1799 (Replaced by sortition)	Philippe Antoine Merlin; 4 September 1797 – 18 June 1799 (Compelled to resign)	Jean-Baptiste Treilhard; 15 May 1798 – 17 June 1799 (Election annulled as irregular)
Paul Barras; 2 November 1795 – 9 November 1799	Louis-Marie de la Révellière; 2 November 1795 – 18 June 1799 (Compelled to resign)	Emmanuel Joseph Sieyès; 16 May – 9 November 1799	Philippe Antoine Merlin; 4 September 1797 – 18 June 1799 (Compelled to resign)	Jean-Baptiste Treilhard; 15 May 1798 – 17 June 1799 (Election annulled as irregular)
Paul Barras; 2 November 1795 – 9 November 1799	Roger Ducos; 18 June – 9 November 1799	Emmanuel Joseph Sieyès; 16 May – 9 November 1799	Jean-François Moulin; 18 June – 10 November 1799	Louis-Jérôme Gohier; 17 June – 10 November 1799

After the Coup of 18 Brumaire (9 November 1799), Barras, Ducos, and Sieyès resigned.
Moulin and Gohier, refusing to resign, were arrested by General Moreau.

=== Consulate ===
Consuls of the Consulate (10 November 1799 – 18 May 1804)
	First Consul	Second Consul	Third Consul
Provisional Consuls (10 November – 12 December 1799)	Napoléon Bonaparte	Emmanuel Joseph Sieyès	Roger Ducos
Consuls (12 December 1799 – 18 May 1804)	Napoléon Bonaparte	Jean-Jacques-Régis de Cambacérès	Charles-François Lebrun

Napoléon Bonaparte proclaimed himself Emperor of the French in 1804, reigning as Emperor Napoleon I 1804–1814 (First French Empire) and 1815 (Hundred Days).

The monarchy was restored 1814–1815 and 1815–1830 (Bourbon Restoration); again 1830–1848 (July Monarchy).

== Second Republic (1848–1852) ==
=== President of the Provisional Government of the Republic ===
Political parties

Moderate Republicans

Portrait	Name (Birth–Death)	Term of office		Time in office	Political party
	Jacques-Charles Dupont de l'Eure (1767–1855)	26 February 1848	9 May 1848	73 days	Moderate Republicans
	Jacques-Charles Dupont de l'Eure (1767–1855)	1848			Moderate Republicans
	Jacques-Charles Dupont de l'Eure (1767–1855)	Appointed President of the Provisional Government by the National Assembly, during the February Revolution. Resigned in May 1848, making way for the Executive Commission.			

=== President of the Executive Commission ===
Political parties

Moderate Republicans

Portrait	Name (Birth–Death)	Term of office		Time in office	Political party
	François Arago (1786–1853)	9 May 1848	24 June 1848	46 days	Moderate Republicans
	François Arago (1786–1853)	1848			Moderate Republicans
	François Arago (1786–1853)	The Executive Commission was appointed by the National Assembly, with François Arago acting as President of the Commission, and other members including Alphonse de Lamartine, Louis-Antoine Garnier-Pagès, Alexandre Auguste Ledru-Rollin and Pierre Marie de Saint-Georges, who acted jointly as head of state. The Commission was removed from power by the National Assembly, during the June Days uprising, and replaced by an executive power under Louis-Eugène Cavaignac.			

=== Chief of the Executive Power ===
Political parties

Moderate Republicans

Portrait	Name (Birth–Death)	Term of office		Time in office	Political party
	Louis-Eugène Cavaignac (1802–1857)	28 June 1848	20 December 1848	175 days	Moderate Republicans
	Louis-Eugène Cavaignac (1802–1857)	1848			Moderate Republicans
	Louis-Eugène Cavaignac (1802–1857)	Granted dictatorial powers by the National Assembly, during the June Days uprising. Following his suppression of the uprising, Cavaignac was appointed Chief of the Executive Power by the National Assembly. He ran in the 1848 French presidential election, but lost to Louis-Napoléon Bonaparte, who was elected the first President of the French Republic.			

=== President of the Republic ===
Political parties

Bonapartist

Nº	Portrait	Name (Birth–Death)	Term of office; Electoral mandates		Time in office	Political party
1		Louis-Napoléon Bonaparte (1808–1873)	20 December 1848	2 December 1852	3 years, 348 days	Bonapartist
1		Louis-Napoléon Bonaparte (1808–1873)	1848			Bonapartist
1		Louis-Napoléon Bonaparte (1808–1873)	Nephew of Napoléon I. Elected first President of the French Republic in the 1848 election against Louis-Eugène Cavaignac. He provoked the coup of 1851 and proclaimed himself Emperor in 1852. Henri Georges Boulay de la Meurthe, Louis-Napoléon Bonaparte's vice president, was the sole person to hold that office.			

Louis-Napoléon Bonaparte proclaimed himself Emperor of the French in 1852, reigning as Emperor Napoleon III 1852–1870 (Second French Empire).

== Third Republic (1870–1940) ==
=== President of the Government of National Defense ===
Political parties

Monarchist

Nº	Portrait	Name (Birth–Death)	Term of office		Time in office	Political party
—		Louis-Jules Trochu (1815–1896)	14 September 1870	13 February 1871	152 days	Moderate Monarchist (Orléanist)
—		Louis-Jules Trochu (1815–1896)	Following the capture of Napoleon III at the Battle of Sedan, the National Assembly proclaimed the establishment of a Government of National Defense, with Louis Jules Trochu as its President. He rallied the French defenses during the Siege of Paris, but the Government was defeated by the nascent German Empire.			

=== Chief of the Executive Power ===
Political parties

Independent

Nº	Portrait	Name (Birth–Death)	Term of office		Time in office	Political party
—		Adolphe Thiers (1797–1877)	17 February 1871	30 August 1871	194 days	Moderate Monarchist (Orléanist); Opportunist Republican
—		Adolphe Thiers (1797–1877)	Elected Chief of the Executive Power by the National Assembly, following the Siege of Paris, and established a government with a republican majority. After fighting to re-establish state control over the Paris Commune and securing the withdrawal of the German Army from France, he was elected President of the Republic by the National Assembly.			

=== Presidents of the Republic ===
Political parties

Monarchist
Moderate Republican
Democratic Republican Alliance; Democratic Republican Party; Social and Republican Democratic Party; Democratic Alliance
Radical-Socialist and Radical Republican Party
Independent

Nº	Portrait	Name (Birth–Death)	Term of office		Time in office	Political party
2		Adolphe Thiers (1797–1877)	31 August 1871	24 May 1873	1 year, 266 days	Moderate Monarchist (Orléanist); Opportunist Republican
2		Adolphe Thiers (1797–1877)	Initially a moderate monarchist, named President of France following the adoption of the Rivet law, establishing provisional republican institutions. He became a supporter of the Third Republic during his term. He resigned in the face of hostility from the National Assembly, largely in favour of a return to the monarchy.			
3		Patrice de MacMahon (1808–1893)	24 May 1873	30 January 1879	5 years, 251 days	Monarchist (Legitimist)
3		Patrice de MacMahon (1808–1893)	A Marshal of France, he was the only monarchist (and only Duke) to serve as President of the Third Republic. He resigned shortly after the republican victory in the January 1879 legislative election, following a previous republican victory in 1877, after his decision to dissolve the Chamber of Deputies. During his term, the Constitutional Laws of 1875 that served as the Constitution of the Third Republic were passed; he therefore became the first President under the constitutional settlement that would last until 1940.			
The Government of Jules Armand Dufaure deputised during the interim (30 January 1879).
4		Jules Grévy (1807–1891)	30 January 1879	2 December 1887	8 years, 306 days	Opportunist Republican
4		Jules Grévy (1807–1891)	The first President of France to complete a full term, he was easily reelected in December 1885. He was nonetheless forced to resign, following an honours scandal in which his son-in-law was implicated.			
The Government of Maurice Rouvier deputised during the interim (2–3 December 1887).
5		Sadi Carnot (1837–1894)	3 December 1887	25 June 1894	6 years, 205 days	Opportunist Republican
5		Sadi Carnot (1837–1894)	His term was marked by Boulangist unrest and the Panama scandals, as well as by diplomacy with Russia. Assassinated (stabbed) by Sante Geronimo Caserio a few months before the end of his term, he is interred at the Panthéon.			
The Government of Charles Dupuy deputised during the interim (25–27 June 1894).
6		Jean Casimir-Perier (1847–1907)	27 June 1894	16 January 1895	205 days	Opportunist Republican
6		Jean Casimir-Perier (1847–1907)	Casimir-Perier's was the shortest presidential term: he resigned after six months and 20 days.			
The Government of Charles Dupuy deputised during the interim (16–17 January 1895).
7		Félix Faure (1841–1899)	17 January 1895	16 February 1899	4 years, 30 days	Opportunist Republican; Progressive Republican
7		Félix Faure (1841–1899)	Pursued colonial expansion and ties with Russia. President during the Dreyfus affair. Four years into his term, he died of apoplexy at the Élysée.			
The Government of Charles Dupuy deputised during the interim (16–18 February 1899).
8		Émile Loubet (1838–1929)	18 February 1899	18 February 1906	7 years, 0 days	Democratic Republican Alliance
8		Émile Loubet (1838–1929)	During his seven-year term, the 1905 law on the Separation of the Churches and the State was adopted. He did not seek reelection at the end of his term.			
9		Armand Fallières (1841–1931)	18 February 1906	18 February 1913	7 years, 0 days	Democratic Republican Alliance; then Democratic Republican Party
9		Armand Fallières (1841–1931)	President during the Agadir Crisis, when French troops first occupied Morocco. He was a party to the Triple Entente, which he strengthened by diplomacy. Like his predecessor, he did not seek reelection.			
10		Raymond Poincaré (1860–1934)	18 February 1913	18 February 1920	7 years, 0 days	Democratic Republican Party; then Democratic Republican Alliance
10		Raymond Poincaré (1860–1934)	President during World War I. He subsequently served as Prime Minister, 1922–1924 and 1926–1929.			
11		Paul Deschanel (1855–1922)	18 February 1920	21 September 1920	247 days	Democratic Republican Alliance; then Democratic Republican and Social Party
11		Paul Deschanel (1855–1922)	An intellectual elected to the Académie Française, he overcame the popular Georges Clemenceau, to general surprise, in the January 1920 election. He resigned after eight months due to health problems.			
The Government of Alexandre Millerand deputised during the interim (21–23 September 1920).
12		Alexandre Millerand (1859–1943)	23 September 1920	11 June 1924	3 years, 262 days	Independent
12		Alexandre Millerand (1859–1943)	An "Independent Socialist" increasingly drawn to the right, he resigned after four years following the victory of the Cartel des Gauches in the 1924 legislative election.			
The Government of Frédéric François-Marsal deputised during the interim (11–13 June 1924).
13		Gaston Doumergue (1863–1937)	13 June 1924	13 June 1931	7 years, 0 days	Radical-Socialist and Radical Republican Party
13		Gaston Doumergue (1863–1937)	The first Protestant President, he took a firm political stance against Germany and its resurgent nationalism. His seven-year term was marked by ministerial discontinuity.			
14		Paul Doumer (1857–1932)	13 June 1931	7 May 1932	329 days	Independent
14		Paul Doumer (1857–1932)	Elected in the second round of the 1931 election, having defeated Aristide Briand. Assassinated (shot) by the mentally unstable Paul Gorguloff.			
The Government of André Tardieu deputised during the interim (7–10 May 1932).
15		Albert Lebrun (1871–1950)	10 May 1932	11 July 1940 (de facto)	8 years, 32 days	Democratic Alliance
15		Albert Lebrun (1871–1950)	Reelected in 1939, his second term was interrupted by the rise to power of Marshal Philippe Pétain.			

The office of President of the French Republic did not exist from 1940 until 1947.

== French State (1940–1944) ==
=== Head of State ===
Nº	Portrait	Name (Birth–Death)	Term of office		Time in office	Political party
—		Philippe Pétain (1856–1951)	11 July 1940	19 August 1944	4 years, 39 days	
—		Philippe Pétain (1856–1951)	1940			
—		Philippe Pétain (1856–1951)	Following the fall of France and the signing of an armistice with Nazi Germany, Pétain assumed dictatorial powers and established a collaborationist government. During the liberation of France, Pétain's government fled to the Sigmaringen enclave, where they awaited the end of the war.			

== Government-in-exile (1940–1944) ==
=== President of the French National Committee ===
Portrait	Name (Birth–Death)	Term of office		Time in office	Political party
	Charles de Gaulle (1890–1970)	18 June 1940	3 June 1944	3 years, 351 days	
	Charles de Gaulle (1890–1970)	1940			
	Charles de Gaulle (1890–1970)	Following the fall of France, he issued the Appeal of 18 June to continue resisting the Nazi occupation of France. On 11 July 1940, he established the Empire Defense Council. On 24 September 1941, he replaced the Defense Council with the French National Committee. On 3 June 1943, his Committee merged together with Henri Giraud's French Civil and Military High Command, forming the French Committee of National Liberation, with the two acting as co-chairs. Following the Liberation of France, the Committee evolved into a Provisional Government, with de Gaulle as its chairman.			

== Provisional Government of the French Republic (1944–1946) ==
=== Chairmen of the Provisional Government ===
Political parties

Independent
Socialist (SFIO)
Centre-right (MRP)

Nº	Portrait	Name (Birth–Death)	Term of office		Time in office	Political party
—		Charles de Gaulle (1890–1970)	3 June 1944	26 January 1946	1 year, 237 days	Independent
—		Charles de Gaulle (1890–1970)	1944			Independent
—		Charles de Gaulle (1890–1970)	Following the Liberation of France, the Committee of National Liberation evolved into a Provisional Government, with de Gaulle as its chairman. He resigned abruptly in January 1946, after a failed attempt to centralise executive power.			
—		Félix Gouin (1884–1977)	26 January 1946	24 June 1946	149 days	French Section of the Workers International
—		Félix Gouin (1884–1977)	1945			French Section of the Workers International
—		Félix Gouin (1884–1977)	Promoted from President of the National Assembly to Chairman of the Provisional Government after de Gaulle's resignation.			
—		Georges Bidault (1899–1983)	24 June 1946	28 November 1946	157 days	Popular Republican Movement
—		Georges Bidault (1899–1983)	1946			Popular Republican Movement
—		Georges Bidault (1899–1983)	Elected as Chairman of the Provisional Government in June 1946, oversaw the passage of the French Constitution of 27 October 1946, then defeated in the subsequent election of November 1946.			
—		Vincent Auriol (1884–1966)	28 November 1946	16 December 1946	18 days	French Section of the Workers' International
—		Vincent Auriol (1884–1966)	1946			French Section of the Workers' International
—		Vincent Auriol (1884–1966)	Elected as Chairman of the Provisional Government in November 1946, overseeing an interim parliamentary government before his accession to President of France.			
—		Léon Blum (1872–1950)	16 December 1946	16 January 1947	31 days	French Section of the Workers' International
—		Léon Blum (1872–1950)	1946			French Section of the Workers' International
—		Léon Blum (1872–1950)	Oversaw the final interim government before the accession of Vincent Auriol to President.			

== Fourth Republic (1946–1958) ==
=== Presidents ===
Political parties

Socialist (SFIO)
Centre-right (CNIP)

Nº	Portrait	Name (Birth–Death)	Term of office; Electoral mandates		Time in office	Political party
16		Vincent Auriol (1884–1966)	16 January 1947	16 January 1954	7 years, 0 days	French Section of the Workers' International
16		Vincent Auriol (1884–1966)	1947			French Section of the Workers' International
16		Vincent Auriol (1884–1966)	First left-wing President of the Republic and first president of the Fourth Republic; his term was marked by the Monnet Plan and the First Indochina War.			
17		René Coty (1882–1962)	16 January 1954	8 January 1959	4 years, 357 days	National Centre of Independents and Peasants
17		René Coty (1882–1962)	1953			National Centre of Independents and Peasants
17		René Coty (1882–1962)	Presidency marked by the Suez Crisis and the Algerian War; appealed to Charles de Gaulle to resolve the May 1958 crisis. Following the promulgation of the Fifth Republic, he resigned after five years as president, giving way to de Gaulle.			

== Fifth Republic (1958–present) ==
=== Presidents ===
Political parties

Centre-left (PS) (2)
Centrist (RE) (1)
Centre-right (CD; RI; PR; UDF) (1)
Gaullist (UNR; UDR) (2)
Neo-Gaullist (RPR; UMP; LR) (2)

Nº	Portrait	Name (Birth–Death)	Term of office; Electoral mandates		Time in office	Political party
18		Charles de Gaulle (1890–1970)	8 January 1959	28 April 1969	10 years, 110 days	Union for the New Republic (renamed Union of Democrats for the Fifth Republic in 1967)
18		Charles de Gaulle (1890–1970)	1958, 1965			Union for the New Republic (renamed Union of Democrats for the Fifth Republic in 1967)
18		Charles de Gaulle (1890–1970)	Leader of the Free French Forces, 1940–1944. President of the Provisional Government, 1944–1946. Appointed President of the Council by René Coty in May 1958, to resolve the crisis of the Algerian War. Supported by referendum, he adopted a new Constitution of France, thus founding the Fifth Republic. Easily elected to the presidency in the 1958 election by electoral college, he took office the following month; having modified the presidential election procedure in the 1962 referendum, he was reelected by universal suffrage in the 1965 election. Launched the Force de dissuasion in 1961. He signed the Élysée Treaty in 1963, building Franco-German cooperation, a key to European integration. In 1966, he withdrew France from NATO integrated military command and had American military personnel stationed on French soil sent home. Supported Quebec sovereignty. Faced the May 68 civil unrest. Resigned following the failure of the 1969 referendum on regionalisation.			
—		Alain Poher; Acting (1909–1996)	28 April 1969	20 June 1969	53 days	Democratic Centre
—		Alain Poher; Acting (1909–1996)	Interim President of France, as President of the Senate. Stood in the 1969 election but was defeated in the second round by Georges Pompidou.			
19		Georges Pompidou (1911–1974)	20 June 1969	2 April 1974	4 years, 286 days	Union of Democrats for the Republic
19		Georges Pompidou (1911–1974)	1969			Union of Democrats for the Republic
19		Georges Pompidou (1911–1974)	Prime Minister under Charles de Gaulle, 1962–1968. Elected to the presidency in the 1969 election against centrist Alain Poher. Favoured European integration. Supported economic modernisation and industrialisation, notably through the launch of the Ariane rocket programme and the TGV high-speed rail project. Faced the 1973 oil crisis. Died in office of Waldenström macroglobulinemia, two years before the end of his term.			
—		Alain Poher; Acting (1909–1996)	2 April 1974	27 May 1974	55 days	Democratic Centre
—		Alain Poher; Acting (1909–1996)	Interim President of France again, as President of the Senate. Did not stand in the 1974 election.			
20		Valéry Giscard d'Estaing (1926–2020)	27 May 1974	21 May 1981	6 years, 359 days	Independent Republicans (renamed Republican Party in 1977) (within the Union for French Democracy from 1978)
20		Valéry Giscard d'Estaing (1926–2020)	1974			Independent Republicans (renamed Republican Party in 1977) (within the Union for French Democracy from 1978)
20		Valéry Giscard d'Estaing (1926–2020)	Founder of the Independent Republicans and later the Union for French Democracy in his efforts to unify the centre-right, he served in several Gaullist governments. Narrowly elected in the 1974 election, he instigated numerous reforms, including the lowering of the age of civil majority from 21 to 18 and legalisation of abortion. Hosted the 1st G6 summit in Rambouillet in 1975. He soon faced a global economic crisis and rising unemployment. Although the polls initially gave him a lead, he was defeated in the 1981 election by François Mitterrand, partly due to disunion within the right. Remained active in politics following his term.			
21		François Mitterrand (1916–1996)	21 May 1981	17 May 1995	13 years, 361 days	Socialist Party
21		François Mitterrand (1916–1996)	1981, 1988			Socialist Party
21		François Mitterrand (1916–1996)	Candidate of a united left-wing ticket in the 1965 election, he founded the Socialist Party in 1971. Having narrowly lost in 1974, he was finally elected in 1981. Mitterrand supervised a series of Great Works, the best known of which is the Louvre Pyramid. He instigated the abolition of the death penalty. After the right-wing victory in the 1986 legislative election, he named Jacques Chirac as Prime Minister, thus beginning the first cohabitation. Reelected in the 1988 election against Chirac, he was again forced to cohabit with Édouard Balladur following the 1993 legislative election. He retired in 1995 after the conclusion of his second term. He was the first left-wing President of the Fifth Republic; his presidential tenure was the longest of any French Republic.			
22		Jacques Chirac (1932–2019)	17 May 1995	16 May 2007	11 years, 364 days	Rally for the Republic (until 2002); Union for a Popular Movement (from 2002)
22		Jacques Chirac (1932–2019)	1995, 2002			Rally for the Republic (until 2002); Union for a Popular Movement (from 2002)
22		Jacques Chirac (1932–2019)	Prime Minister, 1974–1976; upon resignation, founded the Rally for the Republic. Eliminated in the first round of the 1981 election, he again served as Prime Minister, 1986–1988. Defeated in the 1988 election, he was elected in 1995. He engaged in social reforms to counter the "social rift"; ended conscription in 1997; reaffirmed secularity in schools. He dissolved the National Assembly but the left-wing victory in the 1997 legislative election forced him to name Lionel Jospin Prime Minister for a five-year cohabitation. Presidential terms reduced from seven to five years after approval by referendum. In 2002, he was easily reelected against far-right candidate Jean-Marie Le Pen. Sent troops to Afghanistan, but opposed the Iraq War. Declined to seek a third term in 2007 and retired from political life.			
23		Nicolas Sarkozy (b. 1955)	16 May 2007	15 May 2012	4 years, 365 days	Union for a Popular Movement
23		Nicolas Sarkozy (b. 1955)	2007			Union for a Popular Movement
23		Nicolas Sarkozy (b. 1955)	Served in government, 1993–1995 and 2002–2007. Easily elected to the leadership of the Union for a Popular Movement in 2004. Elected to the presidency in 2007, defeating Socialist Ségolène Royal. Introduced a new fiscal package and other laws to counter illegal immigration and recidivism; banned face covering in public spaces. President of the Council of the EU in 2008, he defended the Treaty of Lisbon and mediated in the Russo-Georgian War; launched the Union for the Mediterranean; reintroduced France to NATO integrated military command; hosted the G8 and G20 in 2011. At national level, he had to deal with the consequences of the Great Recession. Following the 2008 constitutional reform, which introduced term limits for presidents, he became the first president since Louis-Napoléon Bonaparte to address the Versailles Congress in 2009. Introduced education and pension reforms. Sent troops to Libya (Operation Harmattan) in 2011. Narrowly defeated in the runoff of the 2012 election.			
24		François Hollande (b. 1954)	15 May 2012	14 May 2017	4 years, 364 days	Socialist Party
24		François Hollande (b. 1954)	2012			Socialist Party
24		François Hollande (b. 1954)	Served as First Secretary of the Socialist Party, 1997–2008 and President of the General Council of Corrèze, 2008–2012. Elected in 2012, defeating Nicolas Sarkozy. Legalised same-sex marriage and restricted dual mandates. Militarily intervened in Mali (Operation Serval), in the Central African Republic (Operation Sangaris) and in Iraq and Syria (Operation Chammal). Paris suffered Islamic terrorist attacks in January 2015 and November 2015, as well as Nice in July 2016. Hosted the 2015 UN Climate Change Conference. Did not seek reelection in the 2017 election, for which polls suggested his defeat in the first round.			
25		Emmanuel Macron (b. 1977)	14 May 2017	Incumbent (Note: Term expires on 13 May 2027)	9 years, 159 days	La République En Marche! (renamed Renaissance in 2022)
25		Emmanuel Macron (b. 1977)	2017, 2022			La République En Marche! (renamed Renaissance in 2022)
25		Emmanuel Macron (b. 1977)	Served as Élysée Deputy Secretary-General, 2012–2014 and Minister of Economics, Industry and Digital Affairs, 2014–2016. Ran as a centrist in 2017, easily defeating Marine Le Pen. Youngest president in French history. Encountered massive demonstrations, notably the yellow vests protests, from 2018 over his policy orientations and style of governance. Faced the COVID-19 pandemic. In 2022, he was reelected with a reduced majority against Le Pen, losing the government's ruling majority in the National Assembly. Launched the European Intelligence College and the European Political Community; co-hosted the 2025 AI summit. Called a snap legislative election in 2024 which further reduced his standing in the National Assembly, forcing him to appoint Michel Barnier of The Republicans as Prime Minister.			

== See also ==
- List of presidents of France by tenure
- Prime Minister of France
  - List of prime ministers of France
