= French special retirement plan =

In France employees of some government-owned corporations enjoy a special retirement plan, collectively known as régimes spéciaux de retraite. These professions include employees of the SNCF (national railways), the RATP (Parisian transport), the electrical and gas companies (EDF and GDF) which used to be government-owned; as well as some employees whose functions are directly related to the State such as the military, French National Police, sailors, Civil law notaries' assistants, employees of the Opéra de Paris, etc. The main differences between the special retirement plan and the usual private sector retirement plans are the retirement age and the number of years a worker must contribute to the fund before being allowed a full pension. In the private sector the minimum retirement age is 62 (since 2010, previously was 60) and the minimum number of quarters of contribution to the retirement fund in order to receive a full pension is between 166 and 172 quarters depending on date of birth. Employees who are enrolled in the special retirement plan can retire earlier.

According to the Conseil d'Orientation des Retraites, a governmental organism created to study the French retirement funds, the statistics for special retirement plans must be considered with caution for the following reasons:

- The population affected is different from the average population (for example the SNCF employs more men than women).
- The special retirement plans have the same purpose as early retirement plans in the private sector. In the private sector the average retirement age is 57.5 whereas the average age at which employees are eligible for full retirement is 61.3. The difference is paid for by the State in the form of early retirement funds or exemption from the usual obligation of searching for employment.
- The comparison with the private sector is difficult due to the differences in retirement allowances, the rate of employee replacement, and the differences in contribution to the retirement funds.
- The advantages offered by the special retirement plan are funded by the employer and form a part of the workers employment contract. For example, 5 years in a career of 40 years represents 12%, however at the SNCF there is no 13th month payment (unlike in the private sector where a minority of employees (mostly from financial institutions like banks, insurance companies, CAC40 corporations) receive between one and three extra months pay (not necessarily at the end of December), and the average salary is 10% lower than the national average.

There are 15 special retirement plans. Most suffer from an imbalance in regards to the number of workers relative to the number of pensioners, in total there are 500,000 workers contributing to the funds and 1,100,000 pensioners. In comparison, in the private sector there are 18 million workers versus 15 million pensioners.

Because of this discrepancy the special retirement plan is partly financed by the State, or by the employees of the government-owned companies that are on the standard retirement plan.

There have been several plans by conservative governments to abolish the special deal and replace it with the standard retirement plan for government-owned companies and civil servants. These efforts have been highly controversial and have caused large strikes such as those of 1995 (1995 strikes in France) and November, 2007 (November 2007 strikes in France).

== History of the special retirement plan ==
Before the welfare state came into being, some companies decided to give their employees a pension in order to attract workers to strenuous or dangerous jobs. Starting from 1679 sailors were allowed a pension if an injury stopped them from working and in 1709 all fishing and merchant sailors were granted a retirement pension. During the 19th century, various other professions were granted pensions, including employees of the Banque de France, employees of the Comédie-Française, civil servants, national rail employees, and miners. Some professions were also given health insurance funds.

In 1930 and 1945 general public welfare funds were introduced that included retirement plans. The employees of the companies who had previously been granted pension schemes decided to keep them instead of participating in the new plans. The ordonnance (law created by the executive organ of State) of October 4, 1945, which is now incorporated into the set of laws regulating social securities measures (code de la Sécurité Sociale), officially permitted these older pension plans to subsist and they became known as the régimes spéciaux (special retirement plans).

== Beneficiaries of the special retirement plans ==
- The French military: the average retirement age is 45.7, if the employee has achieved 40 years of payments he is entitled to a pension equal to 75% of the salary of the last 6 months. If the 40 years have not been achieved, there is a system to calculate the allowance based on the numbers of annuities paid. However, military pension cannot fall beneath a certain minimum (€500 per month for an adjutant, for example);
- EDF and GDF average retirement age: 55.4;
- RATP: average retirement age: 54.8;
- SNCF average retirement age: 52.5;
- The Banque de France has harmonised its retirement plan based on the civil servant one, but keeps a separate fund;
- Sailors: average retirement age: 57.6;
- Comédie-Française;
- Opéra de Paris (1,693 contributing workers and 1,272 retired beneficiaries);
- Miners (14,489 workers and 150,464 pensioners along with than 200,000 other beneficiaries (widows, etc...));
- Members of the Assemblée nationale and of the Sénat;
- Civil law notaries' (45,052 workers and 24,915 retired pensioners);
- National Police;
- The agents of the autonomous Port of Strasbourg, which is the smallest special retirement fund with 156 workers and 203 retired pensioners.

In 2007:

Retirement Plan	Standard private sector plan	Standard public sector plan	Special SNCF plan	Special RATP plan	Special EDF and GDF plans
Salary basis used for calculation of the pension	25 years in 2008	6 months	final earnings (validated over 6 months)	6 months	final earnings
Contribution length	39.5 years in 2007, 40 years in 2008, 41 years in 2012	39.5 years in 2007, 40 years in 2008, 41 years in 2012	37.5 years 40 years in 2012 (if the reform project takes effect)	37.5 years 40 years in 2012 (if the reform project takes effect)	37.5 years 40 years in 2012 (if the reform project takes effect)
Employee contribution percentage	between 10 and 11%	7.85%	7.85%	7.85%	12%
theoretical retirement age	60	60	50 to 55	50 to 60	50 to 60
actual age	61	57	50 to 55	55	55
decrease per missing contribution year	10% and then 5% in 2013	0.6% and then 5% in 2013	0%	0%	0%
re-valuation method	inflation	inflation	company salary	company salary	company salary

== Financing of the special retirement plans ==
Because of the diminishing number of workers in many of the sectors using special retirement plans, most noticeably in mining and railway employment, the contributions of these workers alone would not be sufficient to cover all of the pension commitments. The State, local government agencies, and the standard retirement fund provide the funds needed to balance the expenditures.

The special retirement plan funds are largely in deficit. In 2006 €14.7 billion were paid out in pensions under the special retirement plan, whereas the contributions by workers were only €6.2 billion. As such it has become necessary for the losses to be offset by four different mechanisms:

- Employers have to pay higher social welfare rates (cotisations patronales: the sum of money an employer pays to the State for each of his employees). The increase in welfare taxes paid is subsequently reflected in the prices of the goods or services produced.
- "Balancing" subsidies and revenue transfers: grants are given by the State and local governments (estimated at €5.9 billion) to the retirement funds, generally tax revenue which would normally be sent to the general health care fund is redirected to retirement funds.
- The compensation for demographic imbalances: due to the decline in the number of workers in these sectors relative to the French economy as a whole, the CNAV (Caisse nationale de l'assurance vieillesse des travailleurs salariés national old age insurance fund for salaried workers) and the CNAVPL(Caisse Nationale d'Assurance Vieillesse des Professions Libérales national old age insurance fund for liberal professions) provide funds to help make up for the demographic imbalance. A similar mechanism exists for agricultural workers (€1.6 billion).
- The allocated fiscality: some taxes are directly allocated to the funding of the special retirement plan. A new tax came into effect on January 1, 2006, known as the contribution tarifaire d'acheminement (contribution tariff for the transportation [of electricity]), which taxes electricity and gas (€1 billion) in order to fund the special retirement plan for gas and electrical workers.

=== Relative budgetary weight of worker contributions/pension disbursements ===
Worker category/company	Worker contributions as a percentage of the total revenue of the special retirement fund*:	Pension disbursements as a percentage of the total social benefits budget**:
Miners	4.5%	89.9%
EDF and GDF	35.8%	52.5%
RATP	28.1%	92.7%
SNCF	33.40%	96.30%
Sailors	13.4%	95.0%
Opéra de Paris	46.90%	97.17%
Military	45.1%	87.7%
Elected members of the National Assembly and of the Senate	Unknown	Unknown
Local government	97.5%	78.1%
Civil law notaries' assistants	75.2%	89%
National Police	Unknown	Unknown
Religious ministers	15.8%	90%
Workers in state-owned industrial establishments	29.5%	99.2%

∗ The difference is made up from sources other than worker contributions, these sources may differ depending on the sector or company involved.
∗∗ In addition to pensions, the social benefits budget includes disability insurance, life insurance, and maternity leave, among others.

=== SNCF special retirement plan ===
The decree 54-24 establishes that SNCF personnel may request the right to retire if they satisfy both the conditions of being over 55 years old (50 for drivers who have been working for at least 15 years) and having paid 25 annuities. This same decree also authorises the SNCF to forcefully retire its personnel who meet the same conditions. The pension is equal to 2% of salary per year of work, with a maximum of 75% of total salary.

The SNCF retirement fund created by decree 2007-730 is financed mainly by:

- The "compensation for demographic imbalances" paid by the State (in accordance with the (CEE) Regulation number 1192/69 issued by the Counsel on June 26, 1969 regarding the common rules for the normalisation of railway companies' accounts.)
- Worker contributions: 7.85%
- Employer contributions: 38.15%

== Special retirement plan reforms ==
In 1995 Alain Juppé's government attempted to align the special retirement plan with the standard one but abandoned the reform following large strikes.

In 2007 François Fillon's government was planning a reform of the special retirement plan to make it identical to that of the civil servants. This plan has also provoked widespread strikes in France and was eventually abandoned.

== See also ==
- Pensions in France
- Social security in France
