= List of presidents of France by tenure =

The following is a list of presidents of France sorted by length of tenure.

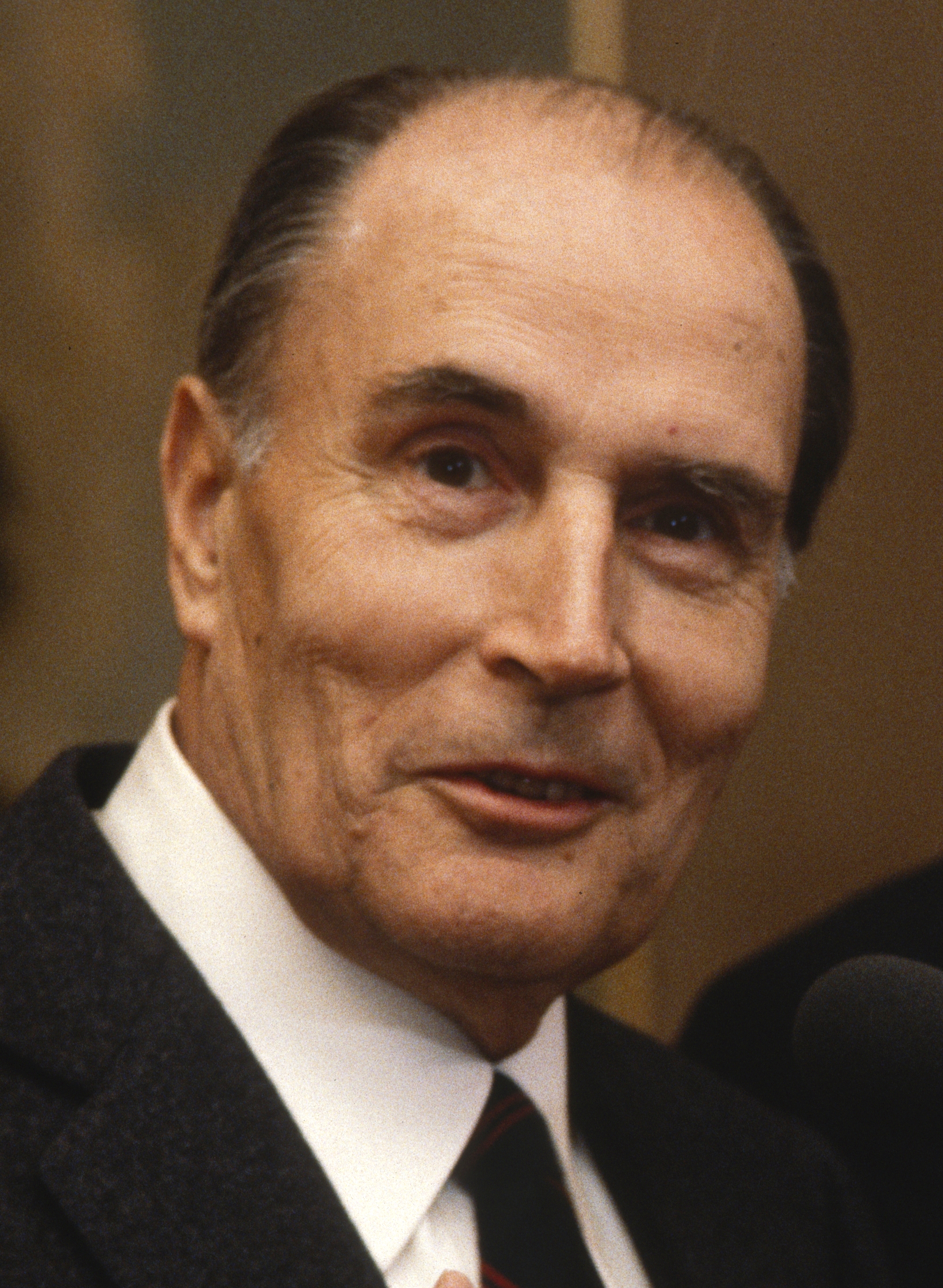
François Mitterrand was President for 14 years.

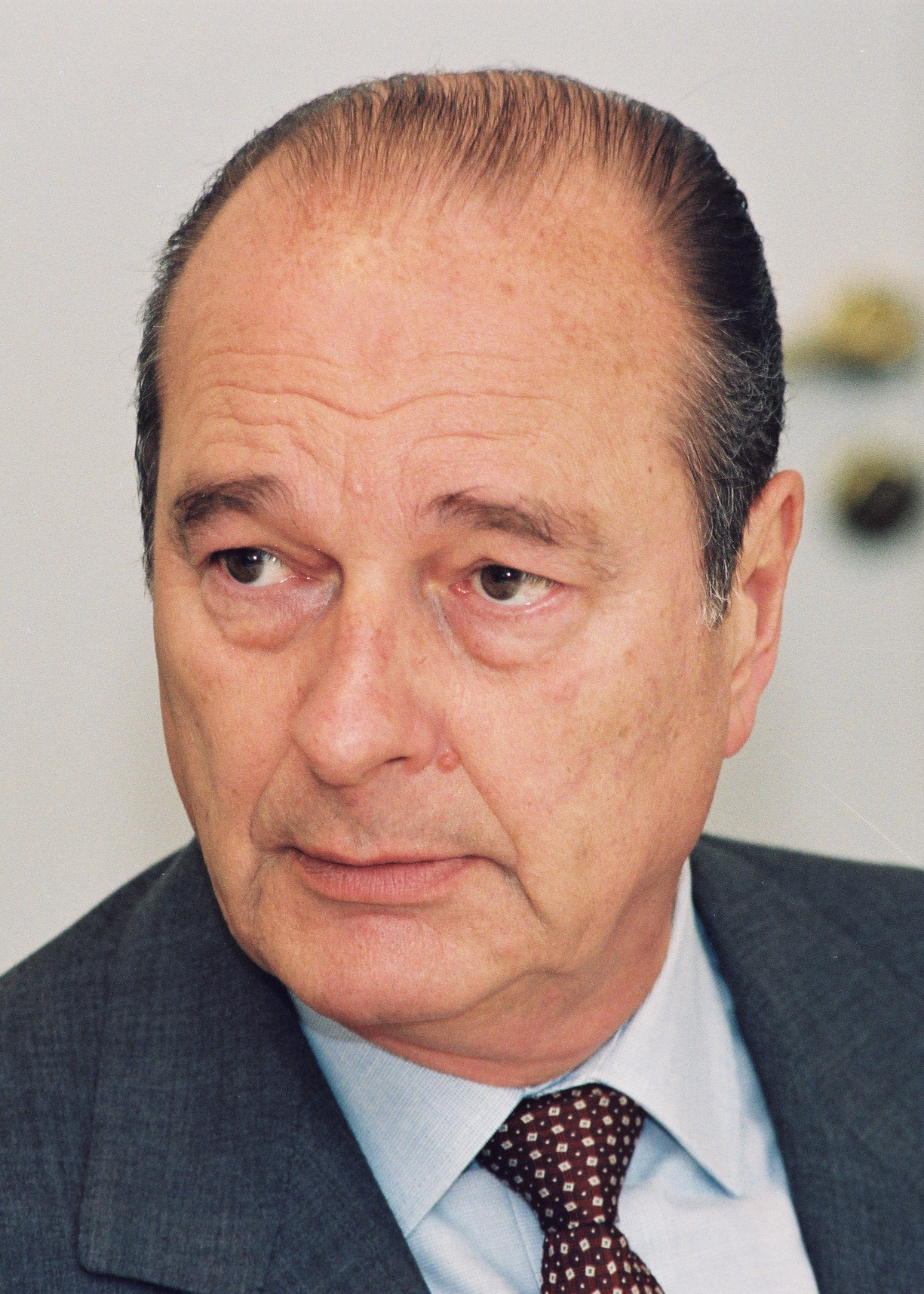
Jacques Chirac was President for 12 years.

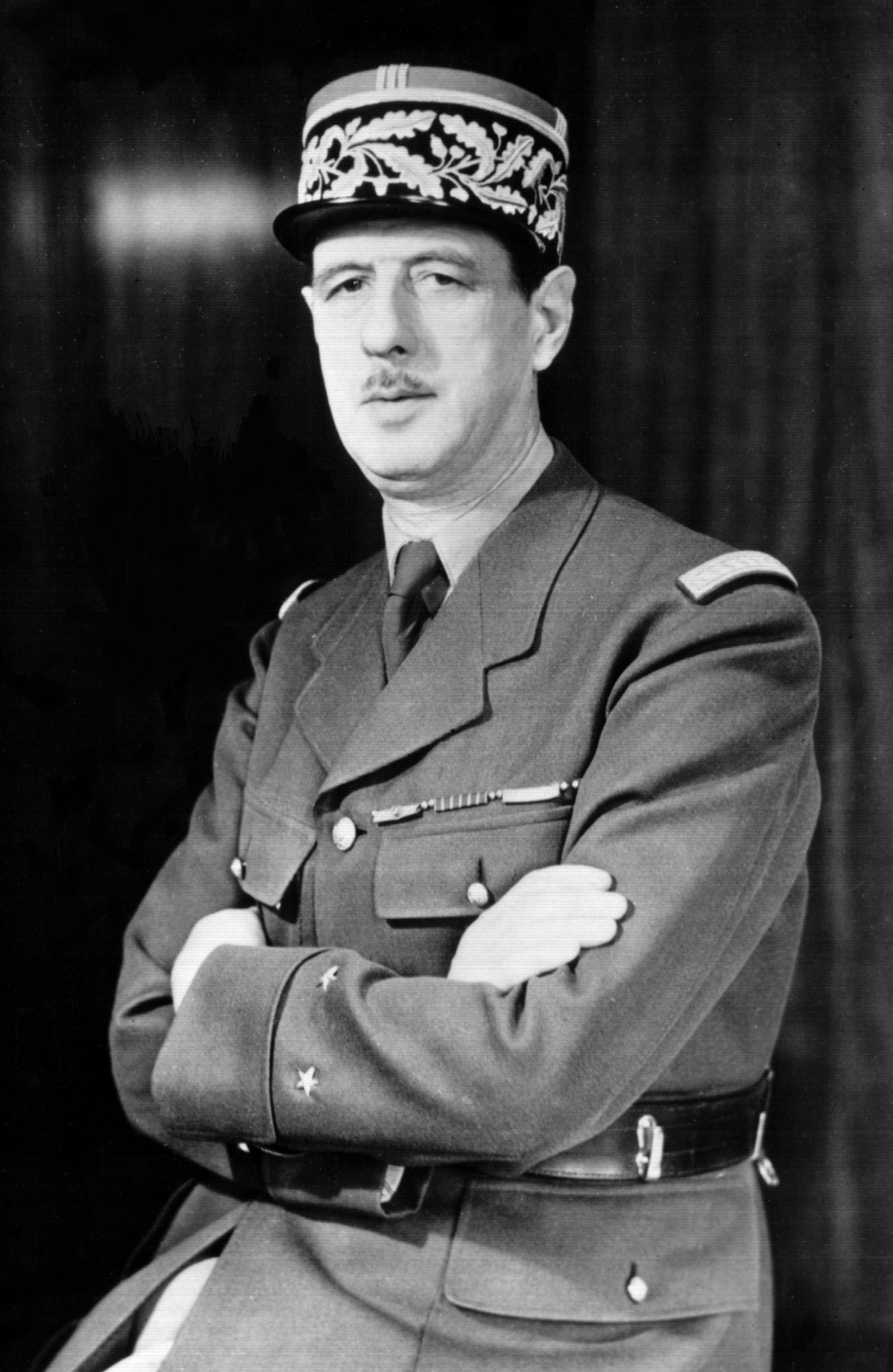
Charles de Gaulle was President for 10 years, provisional head of state for 2 years, and leader of Free France for 4 years.

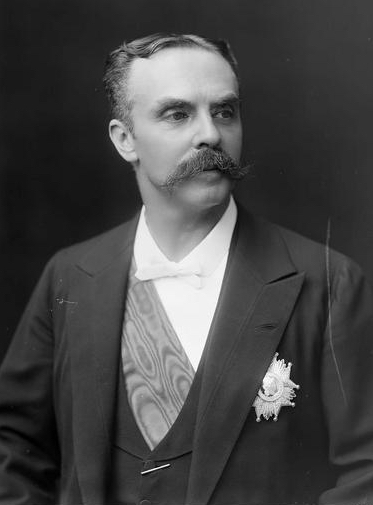
Jean Casimir-Perier resigned in frustration after less than seven months in office.

== List ==
Incumbent president

Rank	President	Length in days	Order	Tenure	Number of terms
1	François Mitterrand	5109	21	21 May 1981 – 17 May 1995	Two full seven-year terms
2	Jacques Chirac	4382	22	17 May 1995 – 16 May 2007	One full seven-year term and one full five-year term
3	Charles de Gaulle	3763	18	8 January 1959 – 28 April 1969	One full seven-year term; resigned 3 years, 4 months and 20 days into second term
4	Emmanuel Macron	3227 (Note: As of 15 March 2026)	25	14 May 2017 – Incumbent	One full five-year term; currently serving second five-year term
5	Jules Grévy	3228	4	30 January 1879 – 2 December 1887	One full seven-year term; resigned 1 year, 10 months and 2 days into second term
6	Albert Lebrun	2983	15	10 May 1932 – 11 July 1940	One full seven-year term; replaced by Marshal Philippe Pétain 1 year, 2 months and 1 day into second term
7 (tie)	Armand Fallières	2557	9	18 February 1906 – 18 February 1913	One full seven-year term
7 (tie)	Vincent Auriol	2557	16	16 January 1947 – 16 January 1954	One full seven-year term
9 (tie)	Émile Loubet	2556	8	18 February 1899 – 18 February 1906	One full seven-year term
9 (tie)	Raymond Poincaré	2556	10	18 February 1913 – 18 February 1920	One full seven-year term
9 (tie)	Gaston Doumergue	2556	13	13 June 1924 – 13 June 1931	One full seven-year term
12	Valéry Giscard d'Estaing	2551	20	27 May 1974 – 21 May 1981	One full seven-year term
13	Sadi Carnot	2396	5	3 December 1887 – 25 June 1894	Assassinated 6 years, 6 months and 22 days into seven-year term
14	Patrice de MacMahon	2077	3	24 May 1873 – 30 January 1879	Resigned 5 years, 8 months and 6 days into seven-year term
15	Nicolas Sarkozy	1826	23	16 May 2007 – 15 May 2012	One full five-year term
16	François Hollande	1825	24	15 May 2012 – 14 May 2017	One full five-year term
17	René Coty	1818	17	16 January 1954 – 8 January 1959	Fourth republic ended 4 years, 11 months and 23 days into seven-year term
18	Georges Pompidou	1747	19	20 June 1969 – 2 April 1974	Died 4 years, 9 months and 13 days into seven-year term
19	Félix Faure	1491	7	17 January 1895 – 16 February 1899	Died 4 years and 30 days into seven-year term
20	Louis-Napoléon Bonaparte	1443	1	20 December 1848 – 2 December 1852	One full four-year term; end of second republic
21	Alexandre Millerand	1357	12	23 September 1920 – 11 June 1924	Resigned 3 years, 8 months and 19 days into seven-year term
22	Adolphe Thiers	632	2	31 August 1871 – 24 May 1873	Resigned 1 year, 8 months and 24 days into seven-year term
23	Paul Doumer	329	14	13 June 1931 – 7 May 1932	Assassinated 10 months and 24 days into seven-year term
24	Paul Deschanel	216	11	18 February 1920 – 21 September 1920	Resigned 7 months and 3 days into seven-year term
25	Jean Casimir-Perier	203	6	27 June 1894 – 16 January 1895	Resigned 6 months and 20 days into seven year term

== By Republic ==
=== French Second Republic (1848–1852) ===
Rank	President	Length in days	Tenure
1	Louis-Napoléon Bonaparte	1443	20 December 1848 – 2 December 1852

=== French Third Republic (1870–1940) ===
Rank	President	Length in days	Tenure
1	Jules Grévy	3228	30 January 1879 – 2 December 1887
2	Albert Lebrun	2983	10 May 1932 – 11 July 1940
3	Armand Fallières	2557	18 February 1906 – 18 February 1913
4	Émile Loubet	2556	18 February 1899 – 18 February 1906
4	Raymond Poincaré	2556	18 February 1913 – 18 February 1920
4	Gaston Doumergue	2556	13 June 1924 – 13 June 1931
7	Sadi Carnot	2396	3 December 1887 – 25 June 1894
8	Patrice de MacMahon	2077	24 May 1873 – 30 January 1879
9	Félix Faure	1491	17 January 1895 – 16 February 1899
10	Alexandre Millerand	1357	23 September 1920 – 11 June 1924
11	Adolphe Thiers	632	31 August 1871 – 24 May 1873
12	Paul Doumer	329	13 June 1931 – 7 May 1932
13	Paul Deschanel	216	18 February 1920 – 21 September 1920
14	Jean Casimir-Perier	203	27 June 1894 – 16 January 1895

=== French Fourth Republic (1946–1958) ===
Rank	President	Length in days	Tenure
1	Vincent Auriol	2557	16 January 1947 – 16 January 1954
2	René Coty	1818	16 January 1954 – 8 January 1959

=== French Fifth Republic (1958–present) ===
Rank	President	Length in days	Tenure
1	Charles de Gaulle	3763	8 January 1959 – 28 April 1969
2	Georges Pompidou	1747	20 June 1969 – 2 April 1974
3	Valéry Giscard d'Estaing	2551	27 May 1974 – 21 May 1981
4	François Mitterrand	5109	21 May 1981 – 17 May 1995
5	Jacques Chirac	4382	17 May 1995 – 16 May 2007
6	Nicolas Sarkozy	1826	16 May 2007 – 15 May 2012
7	François Hollande	1825	15 May 2012 – 14 May 2017
8	Emmanuel Macron	3227	14 May 2017 – Incumbent

== Interim President ==
- Alain Poher, as President of the Senate was called on to serve as Interim President of France in April–June 1969 and April–May 1974.

== See also ==
- List of presidents of France
