= French General Review of Public Policies =

The French General Review of Public Policies (RGPP), in French "Révision générale des politiques publiques", aims at reducing public spending while increasing the efficiency and quality of public action. It was launched by the Fillon Government in July 2007. According to the government, this initiative should give a "boost" to a reform of the state that has so far produced only partial results.

== Aims ==
In recent years several modernization plans have already been undertaken. In particular a new process initiated by the LOLF ("Loi organique relative aux lois de finances" or "Organic Law on Finance Acts") was implemented in 2006, after this reform was voted in 2001. It consists in giving priority to efficiency instead of means in administrations. Also, a circular of 25 June 2003 launched the "ministerial strategies of reform " to be established in each department and presented to Parliament. Finally, a circular of 29 September 2005, followed by a circular of 13 July 2006 establishing a program of systematic audits of government departments.

Yet, these measures have failed to put an end to extreme bureaucracy and to rising deficits. The 2005 Pébereau Report on debt pointed out the concern about a growing deficit. These reports set out the first principles of an urgent review of public policies.
