= Patrick Ouart =

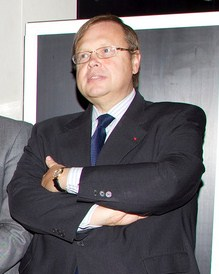
Patrick Ouart (Advisor of LVMH)

Patrick Ouart (born 25 May 1959 in Sallenelle, municipality of Pendé, France) is a former French magistrate, and former personal advisor for justice to Prime Minister Edouard Balladur. He is also a former corporate officer at Suez, in charge of ethical issues and corporate governance. From 16 May 2007 to 2009, he served as personal advisor to the former French president Nicolas Sarkozy.
