= Hospital, patients, health, territories =

2008 French bill presented by Roselyne Bachelot

Hospital, patients, health, territories is the official name of a French bill presented on 22 October 2008 by Roselyne Bachelot, minister of Health, Youth, Sports and Associative Life. The bill is commonly called bill HPST (acronym of the French phrase) or bill Bachelot. The bill is the first stage of the Hospital 2012 Plan, launched by French President Nicolas Sarkozy, aiming to revamp the French health care system. The bill seeks to guarantee better and equal access to care for all French people, regardless of their geographic location. This reform needed a complete overhaul of the hospital's organization, which caused strong protests among the staff.

== Initial project ==
The bill contains four main points, as defined by its official title. It would modernize the hospitals, giving them more financial means to carry out their mission and rehauling their territorial and internal organization. It would also favor research and education. Care provision would be reorganized through coordination between hospitals and cities to guarantee better access to care. The bill would also organize it at a regional level. It would finally reinforce prevention against all addictions, especially for young people and women.

- Prevention

The bill focus on measures to improve the health of young people. Minors (less than 18) would be forbidden from drink alcohol, and encouraged to eat fruits and vegetables.

- Access to health care

The bill would favor better access to good-quality care by implementing a better distribution of doctors throughout the national territory. The provision of care would be organized at a regional level. Financial incentives would be provided in regions lacking health care to appeal to doctors. Private sector practitioners fear the bill would limit their freedom of installation.

The bill finally implements strong decision-making authorities in hospitals, stating that there is currently no defined executive power. Directors will, therefore, see their powers strengthened at the expense of the boards and local elected officials. They will control the hiring of doctors and their pay.

- Modernisation of hospitals

The opening of frontiers between hospital and city medicine is a more controversial point. The bill would cause the mergings and reconversion of many hospitals and the specialization of care provided by some hospitals. Resources and technical means would be polarized in significant hospitals. At the same time, small structures are encouraged to find other orientations and to specialize, notably in the rehabilitation of disabled people and in the care of older people. Also, private organizations will be forced to provide their care to any people, acting as a public service.

- Territorial organization

On a larger scale, regional health agencies will be implemented. They would centralize powers currently exercised by health agencies such as Regional Hospital Agencies (ARH), the Ddass or Health Insurance. Led by the regional prefects, they would manage the overall delivery of care, whether private, hospital or medico-social.

== Immediate reactions ==
Professionals and health care users have reacted to the bill Bachelot.

- Modernization

Reactions over the modernization of the system were rather negative. The trade union Sud-Santé have expressed concerns about the future of the French health system, arguing the law would submit it to capital gains. The organization denounced the dismantling of health public service and the privatization of health care institutions. The Confédération des syndicats médicaux (CSMF) greeted the expected reform of the hospital brought by the bill, which would finally reorganize and modernize the whole system, but denounced the "nationalization" of the health system, arguing the future regional health agencies will be omnipotent. The CSMF proposed various amendments. The Coordination to defend public hospitals declared they were satisfied by the modernization of the system but feared the bill would liberalize the provision health care.

- Territorial organization

There was also discontentment about the reorganization of the system on a regional level (creation of ARS). The National Coordination Committee for the Defense of hospitals argued the reform would worsen the unequal access to care, depriving a portion of the population from health services. They condemned the closure of hospitals planned by the bill. The Interassociative Committee on health (Ciss) approved of the end of little structures, judged as dangerous. The organization is dubious about the quality of care provided by these establishments.

- Access to care

The measures to improve the access to care were also subject to controversy. The National Federation of Workers and disabled (FNATH) approved of the reform of the hospital, but They announced they would propose amendments to ensure the presence of representatives of patients in the supervisory boards of the hospitals. Practitioners fear the bill will liberalize the system with financial constraints for them. There was a massive rejection of the bill by both private-sector and public-service practitioners. The CSMF said the bill would impose a "tax" for medics working in densely populated regions with many infrastructures and resources. However, the Hospital federation (FHF) have fully approved the measures for medics.

- Health

The measures on alcohol were less polemical. The FNATH expressed their disappointment, having expected measures about health at work. The National Association of prevention of addictiveness and alcoholism (Anpaa) has given its full support to the measures limiting alcohol for young people.

== Timeline of events ==
- Presentation of the bill and first reactions. The bill was first presented in the Council of Ministers on 22 October 2008 by Roselyne Bachelot, minister of Health, Youth, Sports and Associative Life. Organizations, Committee and trade unions, coordination's and associations of the health sectors gave their immediate reaction to the bill and began to work on propositions to improve the bill (amendments).
- Discussions by the deputies. From 10 February 2009, the law was debated by the National Assembly. The deputies began discussions on the Title II of the bill on 2 March. The bill was adopted by the deputies on 18 March after long debates.
- Strikes and demonstrations. Before and during the discussions in the Lower House, various strikes and demonstrations were organized. The health sector went on strike on 29 January. The Trade Union Sud-Santé called for new strikes for 12 February and 5 March. The professionals of the health sector also participated in the national strike and regional demonstrations on 19 March, such as the Union syndicale des médecins de centre de santé (UMSCS) and the Coordination nationale
- The call of the 25. On 16 April, 25 professors of Parisians hospitals (AP-HP) launched a call, known as the "call of the 25". They rejected the measures on public hospitals. In particular, they opposed the new management of hospitals, with omnipotent directors. They also denounced the financial constraints imposed to the hospitals.
- The 28 April demonstrations. On 28 April 2009, a massive strike and several demonstrations in the country were organized by various associations, just one day before the April 29 nationwide mobilization. There were 20,000 hospitals professionals (professors, nurses, medics, marching to protest against the Bachelot law. They demanded the quality and the equality of access to care, criticized the transformation of hospitals into lucrative. The move was initiated by Public Assistance - Parisian Hospitals (AP-HP), willing to protest against the suppression of jobs, the closure of hospitals and the strengthening of the executive in hospitals. Many organizations followed the initiative: the Coordination médicale hospitalière (CMH), the Syndicat national des médecins, chirurgiens, spécialistes, biologistes et pharmaciens des hôpitaux publics (Snam HP), the conférence des présidents des commissions médicales d'établissement des centres hospitaliers universitaires (CME-CHU), the Union syndicale des psychiatres (USP) and the Coordination nationale infirmière (CNI), who called for a 24-hour strike. The participants wanted to defend the health public service and rejected the new management of hospitals. It was also meant to pressure the Senate, which was to examine the bill soon after.
- The Marescaux report. After the 28 April strike, senators of the majority declared they would modify the bill so as to satisfy the health professionals. The President of the Senate Gérard Larcher announced the senators would take into account the concerns of the demonstrators. On 8 May, a senatorial commission released a report which opposed the measures concerning the executive in hospitals included in the bill. President Sarkozy declared on 11 May he was favorable to the measures proposed by the report, but refused to concede further modifications of the bill. He announced the government would pass amendments to reform the bill.
- Discussions by senators. The bill was discussed by the Senate from 11 May 2009. Around one thousand and five hundred amendments had been deposed before the opening of the debates.
- Discussion on the legal procedure. The initial procedure to pass the bill allowed only one series of discussions for each house of the congress ("urgency procedure"). However, deputies of the National Assembly expressed their desire to reexamine the bill after the senatorial discussions. Several associations and organizations of health professionals also demanded the change, so as to have a real debate on the bill. On 13 May, the President of House Bernard Accoyer asked the French President Nicolas Sarkozy and Prime Minister François Fillon for permission to discuss the bill, and he was told if the Senate changed the bill considerably, as it announced, the bill would be reexamined. Roselyne Bachelot expressed her opposition to a second series of discussions, arguing the Senate only completed the bill without transforming it.
- The 14 May strike. Despite the numerous amendments passed by the Senate, discontentment among the health professionals continued. On 14 May, a new strike was organized by various organizations. They marched in Paris and in more than 30 cities to defend public hospitals. There were 14,000 in Paris. They also rejected job cuts and the privatization of the health system. However, the strike was limited.

== Evolution and debates ==
Following the legal procedure in France, the bill was first examined by the National Assembly, then by the Senate.

=== Discussions in the National Assembly ===
The discussions in the National Assembly started on 10 February 2009 and ended on 18 March.

- Health care system

Some deputies expressed their reservations about the partnership between public and private, fearing that the participation of the private sector in public service would be a privatization of the provision of care. The initial bill proposed that the directors of the Health Regional Agencies (to be created by the bill) would be the persons in charge of entrusting missions to private clinics in case of deficiency. The deputies approved of this measure. The initial bill proposed the creation of a statute for private clinics entrusted with public service missions, but an amendment modified this status. The initial status "private participating to the hospital public service public" (PSPH) was replaced by "private health institution of collective interest." The Assembly also approved the new way hospitals would be managed. They will be overseen and will have to publish annual reports on the quality of the care provided.

- Debates on prevention

In March 2009, the Parliament debated on the consequences of the prevention plan provided by the bill. Roselyne Bachelot tried to convince the deputies to spare advertising agencies, arguing that firms of other countries have no restrictions. While a report on obesity had been issued in September 2008, the deputies rejected an amendment banning advertisements during television programs for children.

The National Assembly voted the interdiction to sell alcohol to people under 18, against 16 previously, but it officially authorized advertising of alcohol on the web: advertisers are allowed to advertise alcohol on the web and fat and sweet food on television in any program. However, websites dedicated to young people are excluded from this authorization, and also sport associations websites. In addition, advertising will have to be neutral and not intrusive (pop-up, for example). The assembly voted on an amendment to adopt this decision. The Assembly also decided to approve of the fight against binge drinking.

The Association for the Prevention in Alcohol and Addiction (Anpaa) and the French Society of Public Health (SFSP) disapproved of the decision about advertisers, arguing advertising is the major cause of child obesity. They denounced the inconsistency of the bill, which does not implement any restriction, and criticized the influence of lobbies. In particular, representants of the wine industry had expressed their concern about the bill. On 3 March, 23 scientific societies and 17 associations had signed an appeal to parliamentarians to restrict advertising in television for children.

- Access to care

This point is the most polemical of the bill, for it imposed regulations for practitioners. After much debate, the deputies ruled the liberty of settlement would be preserved for medicals. Medicals of regions with important resources would be incited to move to disadvantaged areas. However, they will have financial sanctions ("contributions of solidarity") if they refuse. Medicine students would receive incentives if they choose to settle in disadvantages regions. The Trade union of Liberal Medical (SML) had proposed amendments to guarantee the liberty of settlement for practitioners. The SML said the medicals would be controlled by powerful ARS, and wrote a letter to Roselyne Bachelot. The CSMF criticized the financial sanctions the bill would impose, and call them the "Bachelot tax". They proposed amendments to avoid the imposition of a numerus closus for medic by the ARS. They said the bill threatened the profession., and declared they very disappointed the "Bachelot tax" was maintained. The organization (which is the first trade union of practitioners) accused Roselye Bachelot of wanting to destroy their profession.

=== Discussions in the Senate ===
The official discussions started on 11 May, but a senatorial commission had examined the bill previously. Another discussion is to take place on 20 May.

- Management in hospitals

The senatorial commission release a report, called the "Marescaux report", which proposed various amendments on the title I of the bill, i.e. on measures regarding the reform of the hospitals centers. The report focused on the management of hospitals and criticized the overwhelming power the directors of hospitals would get with the bill. The report said the executive must not be concentrated in the hands of one single person. physicians regarding the governance of the centers. It recalled the three missions of hospitals: teaching, research and care, and said medicals, teachers and researchers should participate in the management of care centers. The government proposed amendments following this report.

- Medicals

The trade union of private sector medicals (SML) have proposed 40 amendments aiming at promoting the professional liberties for medicals. The amendments included the suppression of the "Bachelot tax". Most of the amendments were approved of by the senators. The CSMF also proposed amendments, notably to remove the "Bachelot tax".

== Official texts ==
- Presentation of the bill
- Initial text of the bill
- Amendments of the Parliament
- Bill as of 09 March 2009
- Bill as of 27 April 2009
