= French fiscal package of 2007 =

The French fiscal package of 2007 is a series of measures implemented by the Fillon administration in 2007. The paquet fiscal is often called in France loi TEPA, referring to the law in favor of labor, employment and purchasing power (in French loi pour le travail, l’emploi et le pouvoir d’achat). The package consists of fiscal measures aiming at lightening the fiscal burden on businesses, liberalize the labor market and stimulate investment.

== Aims ==
The bill on labor, employment and purchasing power (TEPA), whose main measures are often commonly known as the paquet fiscal (tax package) shall be beneficial to growth. According to the Fillon administration, shaping a taxation system more favorable to businesses and lower labor costs could encourage the growth of purchasing power, productive investment and the attractiveness of the territory. This measure, implemented short after the election of Nicolas Sarkozy in 2007 as President of the French Republic, as a strong ideological value. According to the official text, "The revival of the economy requires in priority the rehabilitation of work as a value, as a tool to improve the purchasing power and to fight unemployment".

== Measures ==
- Overtime: Overtime will be paid 25% higher than normal hours in all companies. These hours will be exempt from income tax and payroll taxes. This measures has applied in the private sector from 1 October 2007.
- Inheritance tax: the cost of succession will be eliminated for the surviving spouse (married or bound by a PACS). The inheritance tax should be eliminated for 95% of direct inheritance. Donations to children and grandchildren will be encouraged by tax exemptions.
- Interest loans for the acquisition of primary residence: a tax credit of 20% on interest loans will be distributed to households over 5 years for the acquisition of their principal residence. This credit will be capped at 3 750 euros per person and 7500 for a couple, with an increase of 500 per dependent. This tax credit will be paid directly to households not subject to taxation.
- Work of students: exemption from income tax for up to 3 times the minimum wage for employed students under 26.
- Wealth tax: money invested in the capital for SMEs will be deducted from the solidarity tax on wealth (ISF), up to 50 000 per year. It also include investments in reinsertion bodies, teaching institutions and research foundations. The relief on the principal residence in the calculation of the ISF will be increased to 30%.
- Tax Shield: the share of income that can be taken by direct taxes, including CSG and CRDS, will be reduced from 60% to 50%.
- Golden parachutes: the payment of benefits to business leaders will be linked to their performance. The conditions are to be set by the set at the boss' arrival by the board of directors.
- Experimentation of the active solidarity revenue (RSA): The departments willing to do so can implement this solidarity Revenue (RSA), which should ensure an increase in income for all recipients of the RMI accepting a job for a period up to 3 years.

== Cost and financing ==
The cost of these measures was assessed by the government to 13.6 billion euros per year. The exemption on overtime would represent a loss of 6 billion euros for the state budget. The cost of the reduction to 60% of the tax shield would be 600 million euros, the reform of inheritance tax would cost 1.7 billion euros and the cost on interest paid to purchase the primary residence would be of 3.7 billion euros.

The government claimed that will not thwart the European requirements on the recovery of public finances. The government was to announce a reform policy of the State (the "general review of public policies"), which would generate significant savings, for example by not replacing an official two who retired.

== Debate ==
The government relied on the effect of the measures announced and considers that they will both stimulate work (overtime and facilitated transmission of wealth) and increase investment in increasing the attractiveness of the French territory for owners of capital available for investment (tax shield). The parliamentary debate showed that even in the majority, some remained skeptical about the effectiveness of this tax package. the opposition also insisted in the "social unfairness" of several measures.

During the political debate in the National Assembly and the Senate, there were concerns about the compatibility of the measures announced with the state of public finances. In particular, the government claimed that these measures would help raise growth to 2.5% in 2008 while the specialized institutes, including the INSEE, forecast that it would not exceed 2.1%.

Others worry over effects in the medium and long term. In case of the failure of the measures to dynamize economic growth, the government would be forced to seek new revenues to fill gaps and comply with the commitments made at European level (reducing the debt below 60% of GDP by 2010 or 2012). The risk would be an increase in taxes (VAT, CSG and CRDS) with a bad impact on the purchasing power and reducing consumption of some households by 2009.

The parliamentary opposition and the main trade unions consider that this tax package is first "socially unfair". These criticisms referred to the lowering of the tax shield and the deduction of a portion of the interest to acquire the principal residence, which would benefit first to the biggest borrowers, and possibly causing a rise in property prices detrimental to the poorest buyers. Similarly, the exemption of overtime benefit to only a minority of employees in growing sectors and could have a counter-productive effect by limiting new hirings. In addition, these measures mainly benefiting wealthier classes would have a limited impact on consumption.

== See also ==
- Government of France
- Taxation in France
