= November 2007 strikes in France =

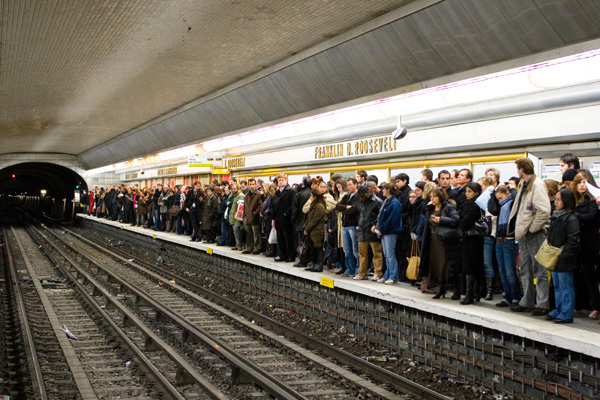
Crowds waiting on the Franklin D. Roosevelt platform for the Paris Métro on 15 November.

A series of general strikes, mostly in the public sector, started in France on 13 November 2007. The strike was over President Nicolas Sarkozy's and Prime Minister François Fillon's attempt to reduce early retirement benefits for 500,000 public employees. Sarkozy had stated that pension reform is the first in a series of measures designed to roll back protections for trade unions in France, and both unions and Sarkozy saw the pension strikes as a key political test.

== Cause of the strikes ==
France's national labour law permits workers in certain hazardous or difficult professions to retire with full pension benefits after 37.5 years rather than 40 years. The Sarkozy administration claims the current pension system allows some public sector workers to retire as early as age 50. The government calculated the cost of these early-retirement benefits at $7 billion a year.

President Nicolas Sarkozy felt that his victory in the 2007 presidential election gave him a mandate to carry out labour reforms, stating "I said before I was elected what I would do," and "we will do these reforms because they have to be done." He declared the strikes a test of political will. "I will pursue these reforms to the end," he said in a speech to the European Parliament. "Nothing will blow me off course."

Prime Minister François Fillon attacked the unions for depriving millions of French people "of their fundamental freedom—the freedom of movement and even perhaps to work."

Bernard Thibault, the secretary of the Confédération générale du travail (CGT), France's second-largest labour union, compared the strikes to the 1995 strikes in France, saying, "The general discontent is as strong as then," and "We're not trying to copy 1995, but the strike could last."

== Beginning of the strikes ==
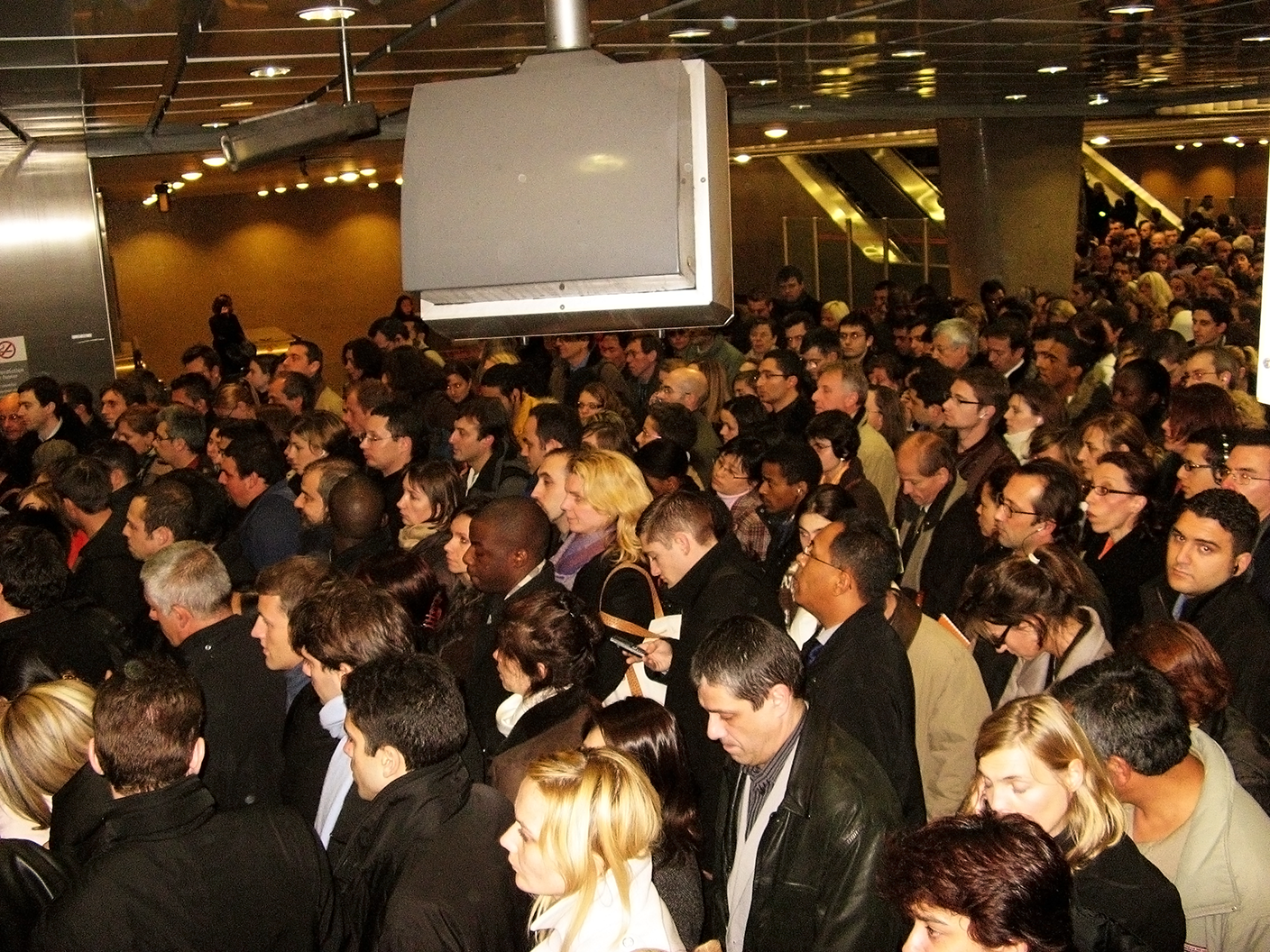
Passengers waiting for the next train at the La Défense Métro station. Access to the station had to be restricted due to overcrowding

On 13 November 2007, SNCF rail workers and Paris Métro personnel became the first group of workers to commence their strike. Labour Minister Xavier Bertrand met with union leaders on 14 November 2007 to try to find a resolution. On the first day of the strike, only 90 out of 700 TGV trains were running, and other rail services were reduced sharply. In Paris, the Métro was only running at 20% capacity and bus services only at 15%. However, some Métro lines experienced fewer disruptions than expected, leading some observers to conclude that support for the strike was not as strong as unions claimed.

30% of the workers of the 70% state owned Gaz de France and Électricité de France went on strike on 13 November, reducing the national electricity production by 8000 MW (roughly 10%). There were no fears of power outages. The Opéra National de Paris, a group subject to the special retirement plan (régimes spéciaux de retraite), also cancelled performances.

In addition, some university students demonstrated and blocked the entrances to their campuses in opposition to plans to allow private funding of Universities. In the University of Nanterre students were forcefully removed by riot police, however this was censored on the national news. On 13 November the newspaper Le Figaro (which is owned by Sarkozy supporter Serge Dassault) and the cable news channel LCI reported that a survey found that about 7 out of 10 people said the strikes were unjustified.

== Conclusion of the strikes ==
Minister of Employment, Social Cohesion and Housing Xavier Bertrand, whose portfolio includes labor relations, held several negotiating sessions with the unions throughout the day on 13 and 14 November. Bertrand told the unions that pension reform was non-negotiable, but proposed a month-long period of negotiations between the unions and each state-controlled agency to discuss ways to minimize the effects on existing workers.

Some improvements in mass transit also occurred on 14 November. The main Métro commuter lines remained shut, while other lines ran between 20 and 50 percent of normal capacity. However, only a third of Paris buses were running. The Associated Press reported that 150 of the 700 high-speed TGV trains were running, an increase of 60 over the day before.

On 18 November, a demonstration was held by pro-reform and anti-strike organizations in Paris. They gathered between 8,000 and 20,000 protesters against public transportation strikers, calling them "hostage takers".

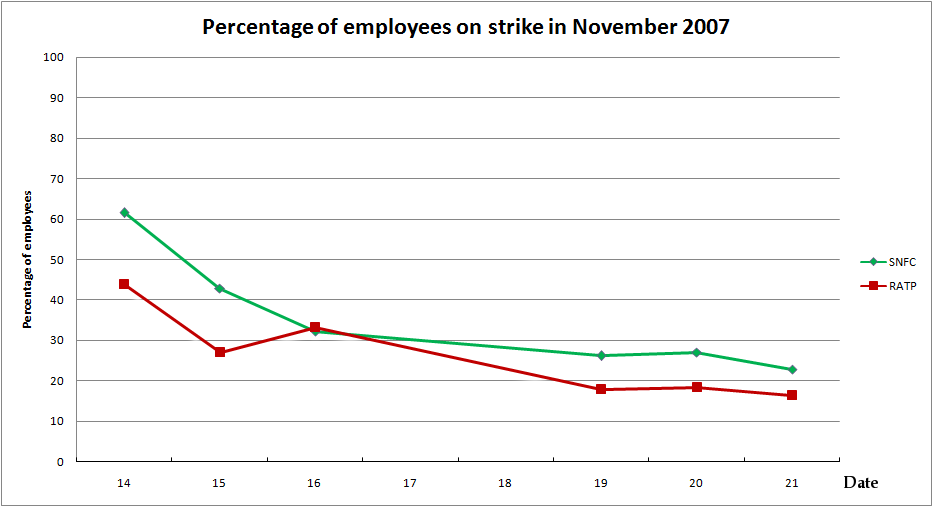
Percentage of RATP and SNCF employees reported as being on strike by their employers

20 November marked the 7th day of striking and strikers were joined by other civil servants including teachers, postal workers and newspaper printers. The printers were also protesting against reorganisations within the printing industry. Air traffic control employees were also on strike, causing delays of 45 minutes on flights from the Parisian airports according to ADP.

During the night from 20 November to 21 November, the TGV network was sabotaged by fires, further adding to the delays. Approximately 30 kilometres of track were damaged, both the unions and the President condemned these acts.

On 21 November, the CGT called for the strikes to stop as the government has allegedly agreed to negotiate. An opinion poll published in the Figaro estimates 2/3 of the French are against the strike, and the Ministry of Economy declared that the strike was costing the French economy €400 million a day and SNCF €100 million a day. According to the SNCF, the operator of the national train lines 23% of their staff were still on strike, while the RATP operating the Paris Métro, and some suburban trains claimed 16% of their staff were on strike. However the service on the Parisian trains and Métro was still below 25% because most of the strikers were train drivers.

On 21 November the number of strikers continued to diminish, and talks were engaged in-between the government and the unions.

Strikes continued on 22 November with the numbers of strikers still diminishing, and public transport was still heavily affected. Following a day of ongoing talks with the government, 42 of the 45 union committees voted to stop the strike, and the RATP and SNCF announced almost normal levels of service for 23 November, with in-between 70 and 100% of public transport services running. It is said talks could last for a month.

=== Planned strikes ===
Several additional strikes were also planned. Among them are:

- 29 November 2007 – Employees of the justice system.

Telecommunications workers and bankers have also scheduled strikes.

== See also ==
- 2006 labour protests in France
- May 1968
