= Jean Bergougnoux =

French businessman (1939–2023)

President of the SNCF
- In office 2 May 1994 – 21 December 1995
- Preceded by: Jacques Fournier
- Succeeded by: Loïk Le Floch-Prigent

Personal details
- Born: 15 October 1939 France
- Died: 3 September 2023 (aged 83) Chambray-lès-Tours, France
- Education: École polytechnique
- Occupation: Businessman

Jean Bergougnoux (15 October 1939 – 3 September 2023) was a French businessman. He served as Director-General of Électricité de France (EDF) from 1987 to 1994 and was President of the SNCF from 1994 to 1995.

== Early life ==
Born on 15 October 1939, Bergougnoux worked as a polytechnician and engineer for ENSAE Paris.

== Career ==
He began his career with the Institut national de la statistique et des études économiques. He joined EDF at the age of 24.

He became director of strategies before serving as Director-General from 1987 to 1994. During this period, he was the first president of Eurelectric, an association bringing together European electricians. He also chaired the Studies Committee of the World Energy Council. He was named President of the SNCF on 2 May 1994, a position he held until 21 December 1995. He resigned due to the 1995 strikes against the Juppé plan. In 2016, he was named honorary president of the SNCF.

After his time in the public sector, Bergougnoux worked as an international consultant in the fields of transport and energy. He was also a facilitator for various working groups, such as the Commissariat général à l’investissement and the Commissariat général à la stratégie et à la prospective. In 2011, he founded the think tank Équilibre des énergies, which he presided over until 2014, when he became honorary president.

== Death ==
Jean Bergougnoux died in Chambray-lès-Tours on 3 September 2023, at the age of 83.
