= Jean-Marc Sauvé =

French civil servant

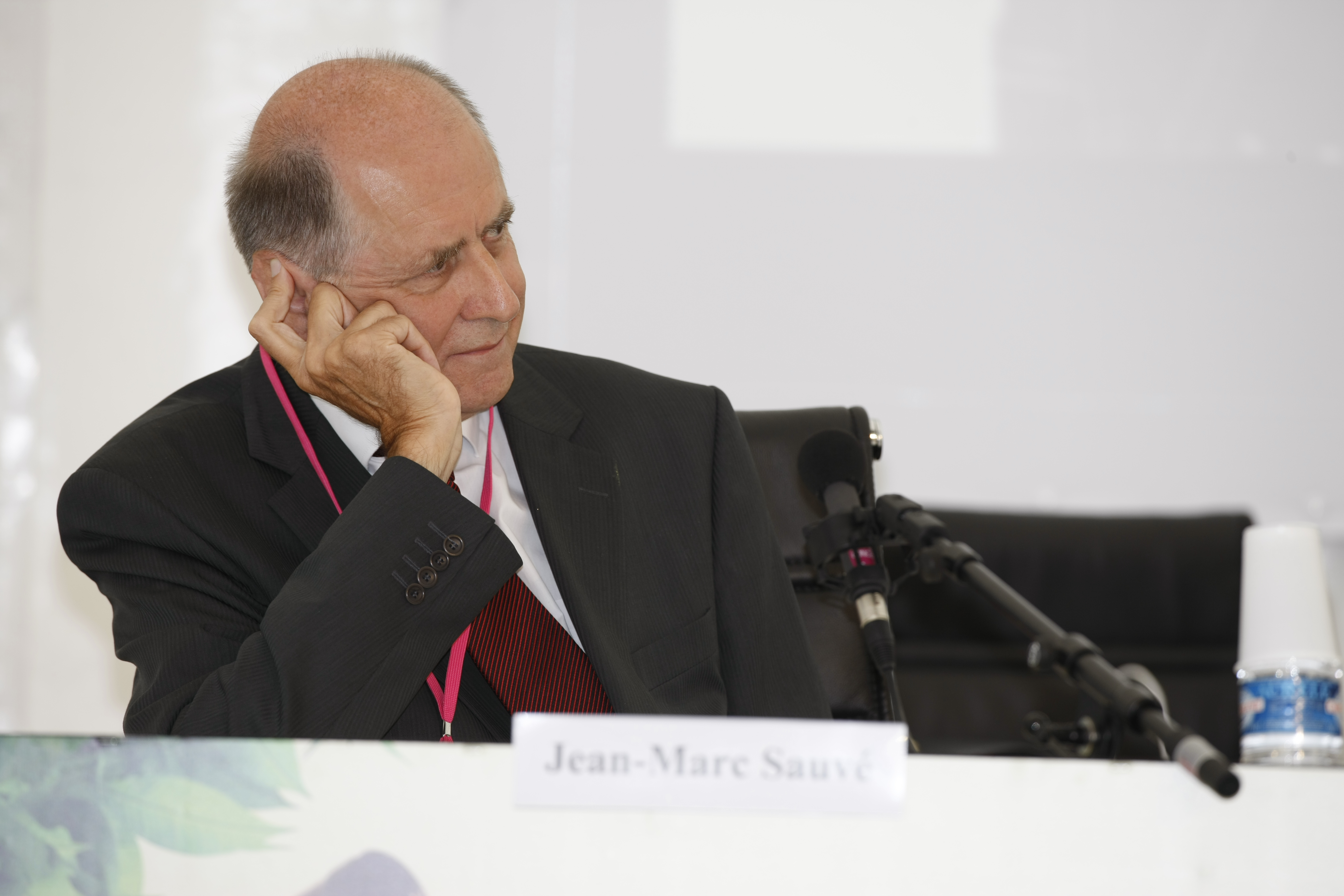

Vice-president of the Conseil d'État
- In office 3 October 2006 – 29 May 2018
- Preceded by: Renaud Denoix de Saint Marc
- Succeeded by: Bruno Lasserre

Personal details
- Born: 28 May 1949 (age 77) Templeux-le-Guérard, France
- Education: Sciences Po, ÉNA
- Occupation: Civil servant

Jean-Marc Sauvé (born 28 May 1949) is a French civil servant. He formerly was vice-president of the Council of State (France) and is now president of the French Institute of Administrative Sciences.

== Biography ==
In 1977, he finished first in the École nationale d'administration (French national school of administration). Most of his career was spent as a functionary and magistrate in the Council of State (France) (the Administrative Supreme Court of France). He was also adviser of the French justice minister and speaker of the government from 1995 to 2006.

On 13 September 2006 he became vice-president of the Council of State (France), the Administrative Supreme Court of France. He holds the position of President of the Cité internationale universitaire de Paris. He was President of the institution when in August 2018 when an unusually large number of Argentinean students were expelled overnight. The students alleged that these unusual expulsions took place in order to silence feminist and pro-choice Argentinean students in Paris, as Argentina was heading towards a Senate vote to end the penalisation of abortion.

== See also ==
- Conseil d'État (the Supreme Court of France for administrative law)
- French Institute of Administrative Sciences (IFSA)
