= Jean-Baptiste Bernard Viénot de Vaublanc =

French military officer (1761–1812)

Jean-Baptiste Bernard Viénot, chevalier de Vaublanc (17 September 1761 in Ouanaminthe, Saint-Domingue – 19 December 1812 in Lithuania), Chevalier of the Légion of d'honneur. the second younger brother of Vincent-Marie Viénot de Vaublanc.

== Biography ==
Insignia of the family de Vaublanc

- Jean-Baptiste was raised in the Paris Military School.
- At 16 he returned to Saint-Domingue to take part in his first military campaign.
- He took part in the American War of Independence as a Lieutenant in the Saint-Domingue Volunteer Light-Infantry, a corps of French colonials from the Antilles.
- On 12 March 1779, he took part in the siege of Savannah (Georgia) and in the engagements instigated by La Motte Picquet.
- Jean-Baptiste was, among other French officers, thanked by the new American government with territorial concessions.
- Discharged on 6 March 1780 on grounds of ill health.
- Bodyguard in the Villeroy district from 28 September 1783, 2nd Lieutenant in the Alps Light Infantry, 23 September 1784.
- Lieutenant, 10th Light Infantry Regiment.
- Captain of the National Gendarmerie, 15 June 1791.
- Nominated Adjutant General, Chef de Bataillon, 18 May 1792.
- Promoted to Adjutant General, Brigadier General by Pichegru, making him a part of the Army of the Rhine.
- Transferred to the 6th Division, under General Reed.
- In October, 1793, he is derobed by Jean-Nicolas Pache and then by Jean-Baptiste Bouchotte for being to lenient and of noble birth. He is still kept in his position by the representatives of the people.
- 7 June 1794, he marries Marie-Charlotte Sophie Pion de Mieslot.
- On 9 October 1794 he is again suspended from duty, this time under suspicion of terrorism.
- On 15 January 1795 he is reinstated by the Sevestre representative.
- On 3 April 1795 he resigns his commission and settles in Besançon.
- In May 1795 he and his godfather, Antoine Pion are arrested for their political activities.
- In March 1796 he is nominated the Administrator of the Central School of Doubs.
- Due to his lack of an identifiable rank he is commissioned as Revenue Inspector on 7 February 1800 by the Duke of Feltre for his "sincere integrity" and "remarkable activity". He is sent to the Calvados department.
- The position of Revenue Inspector, a new position, was also known as "Guardian of the Treasure of the Grande Armée" and involved fiscal administration of the workforce, of sales and the administration of the soldiers of each army. The Revenue Inspector was under the responsibility of each Quarter Master General of each army.
- In 1803 he was transferred to Montpellier, where his son, Vincent-Victor Henri Viénot de Vaublanc is born.
- In 1807 he participates in the Spain and Portugal campaigns, whereupon he is promoted, by Napoleon himself, to Revenue Inspector in Chief of the 1st Obesevation Corps of the Gironde, commanded by General Junot of the Army of Spain. The Army of Spain, reduced from 25,000 men to 1,500 since its departure from Bayonne, finally makes it to Lisbon on 30 November 1807.
- Jean-Baptiste is nominated a member of the Portuguese Council, presided over by General Junot, the Duc of Abrantès, where he performs secretarial duties.
- The Council of Portugal sets itself up at first in the Palace of Queluz, during the French occupation of Lisbon and then in the centre of the country during 1807–8, adhering to the Franco-Spanish Treaty of Fontainebleau.
- In 1812 he is named Revenue Inspector in Chief of the Grande Armée and begins preparations for the invasion of Russia. Compelled to be a part of the Russian invasion, despite protestations form Marshall Berthier and his family, Jean-Baptiste followed the Grande Armée into Russia, despite his failing health.
- As the retreat from Russia began, Jean-Baptiste saved a painting from the Moscow fires and keeps it with his belongings. However, he was soon forced to proceed, on foot, sword in hand, despite fever and bloodsoaked feet. Nevertheless, Jean-Baptiste makes it to Gambinen in Prussia, near Vilnius, Lithuania, before finally succumbing to the ravages of war. In a letter intended for France he wrote: "What folly should be mine to have come this far, were it not the most valid reasons that drove me!"

With him, a work on military administration, due to be published, also vanished. Although he held the keys to the Empire's coffers, he died penniless and left no inheritance.
