= Vincent-Victor Henri Viénot de Vaublanc =

Viscount of Vaublanc (1803–1874)

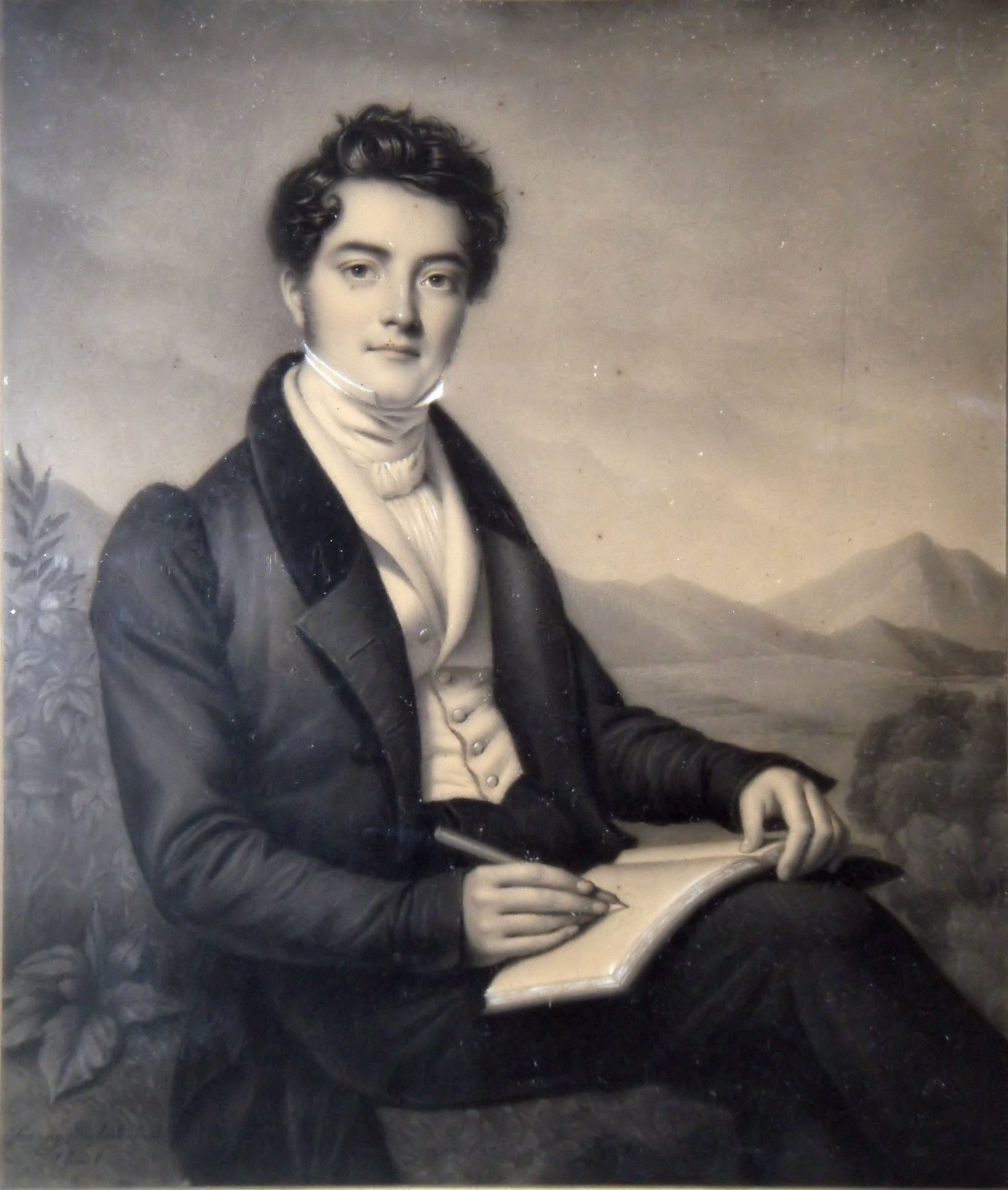
- Viscount of Vaublanc
- Born: July 19, 1803; Montpellier
- Died: August 15, 1874 (71 years old); Munich
- Occupations: Grand master of the household of the royal princess and later queen of bavaria marie of prussia
- Years active: 1845 – 1864 (19 years)
- Spouse(s): Jeanne de Raismes (1806–1887 – daughter of Louis-Désiré de Raismes and Marie de Verdière)
- Father: Jean-Baptiste Bernard Viénot de Vaublanc

Vincent-Victor Henri Viénot de Vaublanc, known as the Viscount de Vaublanc, was a French writer, artist, civil administrator, and diplomat born on July 19, 1803, in Montpellier, and died on August 15, 1874, in Munich.

The nephew of Count Vincent-Marie Viénot de Vaublanc, he began his professional career at the Council of State in Paris as an auditor. In the aftermath of the July Revolution of 1830, he resigned from his position due to his legitimist beliefs, refusing to pledge allegiance to the newly crowned King Louis-Philippe I. He subsequently withdrew to his family's estate in Beaujolais. Following a period of unemployment, he relocated to the court of the Kingdom of Bavaria. There, he formed a friendship with the crown prince, which led to his appointment as chamberlain and subsequently Grand Master (Oberhofmeister) of the household of the Queen of Bavaria, Marie of Hohenzollern. He remained in this position for nearly thirty years, during which time he became one of the closest friends and advisors of Crown Prince Maximilian II, who subsequently became King of Bavaria.

Vaublanc was also a prolific writer, authoring numerous works of historical and literary merit. Among his notable contributions to literature is a comprehensive account of medieval history titled La France au temps des croisades, which was published between 1844 and 1847.

== Biography ==
=== Youth in France ===
A member of the Viénot de Vaublanc family, originally from Burgundy and ennobled through a royal secretary position in 1697, Vaublanc was born on July 19, 1803, in Montpellier. He was the second son of Jean-Baptiste Bernard Viénot de Vaublanc, who at the time was serving as an army inspector under Napoleon and Sophie Pion. His father perished during the retreat from Russia when he was only nine years old.

From 1816 to 1822 he pursued part of his studies at the Lycée Louis-le-Grand in Paris. He was one of the inaugural six auditors at the Council of State, appointed in 1824 with the backing of his uncle, the elder brother of his late father, Vincent-Marie de Vaublanc, a prominent ultra-royalist politician, former Minister of the Interior under Louis XVIII, and member of the Chamber of Deputies. He was a regular visitor to the salons of the Faubourg Saint-Germain, where he had the opportunity to meet Talleyrand, Chateaubriand, and Lamartine.

Vaublanc was a member of the litigation committee and was on the verge of being appointed Master of Requests at the Council of State when the Revolution of 1830 erupted. In response to the political upheaval, he relinquished his post in favor of the elder Bourbon branch. He then retired to Beaujolais, where he spent several years unemployed and began his writing career.

=== Emigration to the Court of Bavaria ===
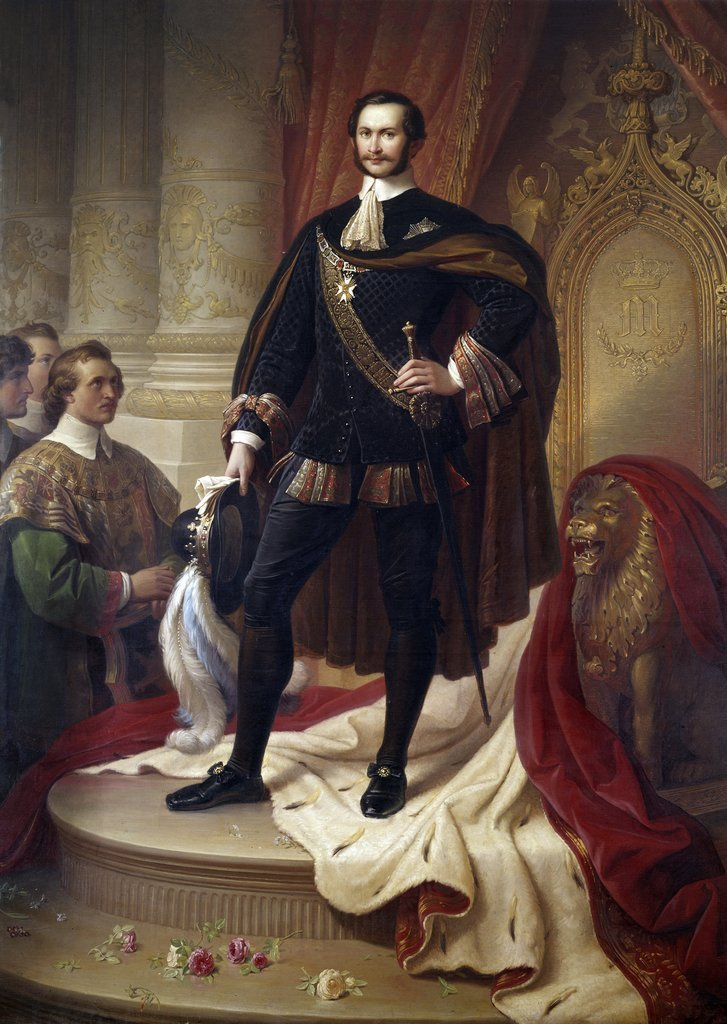
The viscount was one of King Maximilian II of Bavaria's closest friends for twenty-eight years.

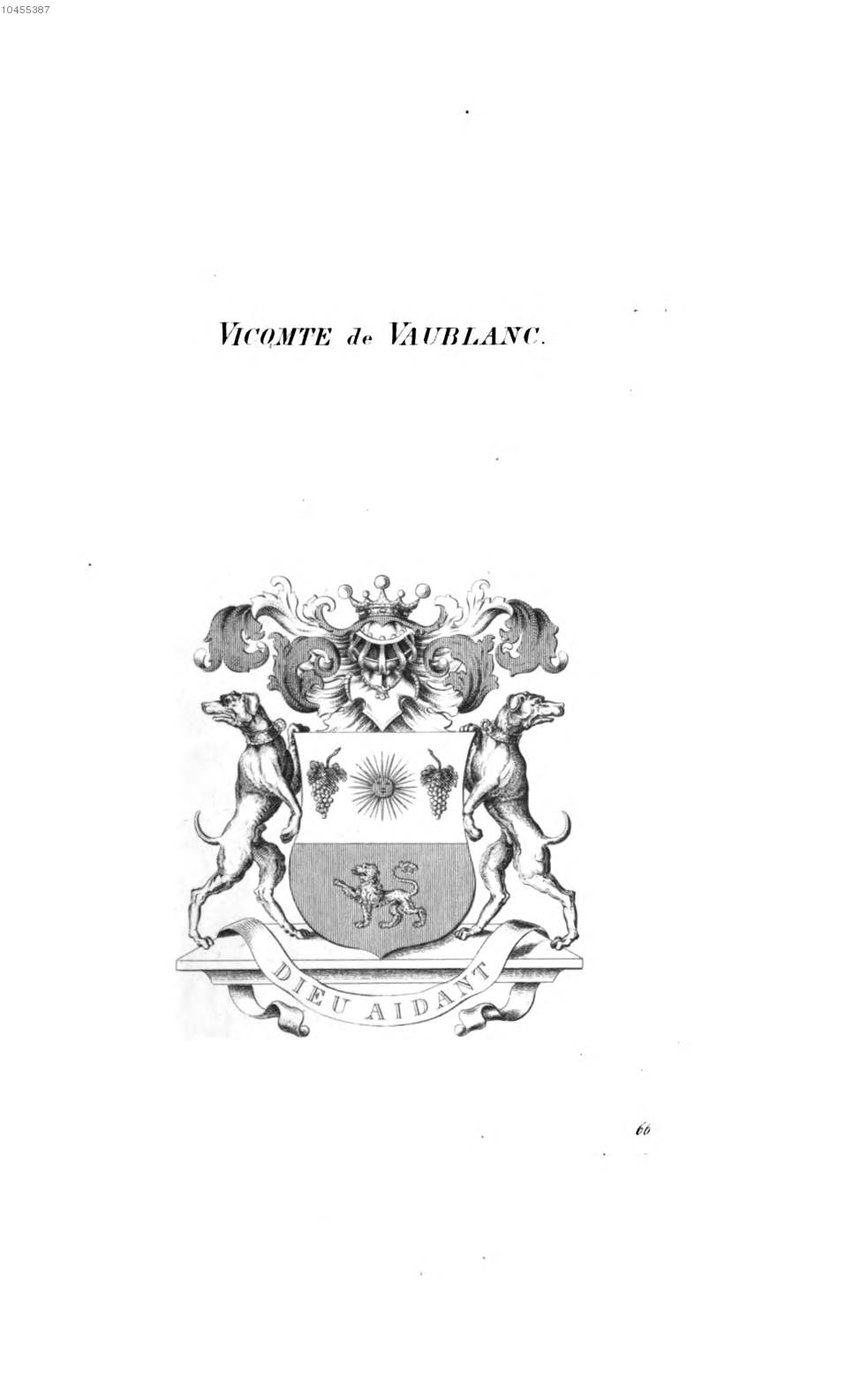
Arms of Vincent-Victor Henri de Vaublanc.

In 1836 he accepted a two-year position in Germany with the Crown Prince of Bavaria, Maximilian, and subsequently remained in the role of chamberlain at the court of the latter's father, King Ludwig I of Bavaria.

This position enabled him to attend the coronation of Queen Victoria on June 28, 1838. He accompanied Prince Maximilian, who attended incognito under the pseudonym of Count von Werdenfels. During a visit to the elite London circle of Almack's, the London Society provided the following description of him:

Shorter [than Prince Maximilian], the distinguished man with brown hair beside him is the Viscount de Vaublanc, the nephew of Charles X's minister and both friend and gentleman of the King Max's Chamber... De Vaublanc is a collector of antiquities, an author, an artist, cheerful and witty, but thoughtful and hard-working.

He was reluctant to pursue naturalization and instead sought authorization from King Louis-Philippe I on April 6, 1842, to serve abroad. In Munich, he engaged with other émigrés in salons such as that of General Parceval's wife. In 1841, he married Jeanne de Raismes.

In 1845 he was appointed Grand Master of the household of the Bavarian crown princess, Marie of Hohenzollern. In 1848, he assumed the same role as the Queen of Bavaria, following her husband Maximilian II's ascension to the throne. This was one of the four most significant positions at the Bavarian court, primarily ceremonial. (Note: In his account of his time in Munich, Baron Adolphe Thiébault provides a detailed description of Vaublanc's role at the court, with a particular focus on the proceedings of a royal audience with the queen, as outlined in his work, Vingt semaines de séjour à Munich: Presentation. Before a quarter past 3, Baron de Méneval accompanied me to the queen. In the salon where we found Madame de Pillement [Grand Mistress of the Queen of Bavaria's household] and Viscount de Vaublanc, we did not have to wait long. Her Majesty received us in the third salon... Madame de Pillement, in full dress for dinner, and Viscount de Vaublanc in a simple uniform (blue), stood at some distance; the baron introduced me... Her Majesty, having that same day to give, before dinner, an audience to some ladies, did not keep us long. She passed, followed by Madame de Pillement, into other apartments, while Viscount de Vaublanc escorted us to the stairway door.)

In 1846 he accompanied Crown Prince Maximilian of Bavaria to Paris. In his work Choses vues, the writer Victor Hugo described him:

The door opened. A man entered, rather young, with a pleasant face, around forty, dressed in black, with a white cross and a yellow ribbon at his buttonhole. He is a French legitimist, Mr. Viscount de Vaublanc, nephew of the former minister. Mr. Viscount de Vaublanc settled at the court of Bavaria, where he is the reader of the crown princess and Grand Master of the prince's court. He dined with the prince at Mr. Guizot's and had not set foot in the Foreign Affairs office since 1823.

In 1864 he relinquished his role as chamberlain following the demise of Maximilian II. Vaublanc, who had rebuilt his life in Bavaria, elected to reside there until his demise. In 1867, his visit to the Paris Exposition Universelle prompted him to compose a book.

In the early 1870s the Goncourt brothers provided a detailed account of his character in their journal, this time without restraint, following an account of a dinner in Munich attended by members of the Catholic and anti-Prussian circles. De Vaublanc, former chamberlain and former friend of the late King Louis, an old French émigré, who never learned to speak German, was described as "very amiable, very deaf, and very 18th century." He died without descendants on August 15, 1874, in Munich.

=== Close advisor to King Maximilian II of Bavaria ===
Although not officially designated as an advisor, Vaublanc was a trusted confidant of the monarch and exerted unofficial influence over him in matters about the arts. He regularly accompanied the king on evening walks, either on foot or by carriage, during which a topic related to political economy, art, or literature was introduced by the prince. The ensuing conversation would either develop the topic further or, at the king's request, provide a written summary, which would be placed on his table the following day.

In 1851, at the behest of the monarch, the Viscount devised a series of proposals aimed at enhancing the architectural beauty of Munich. These recommendations were outlined in a document entitled Propositions pour le roi Maximilien II (Vorschläge für König Maximilian II, 1851/52). For example, he was the driving force behind the initial architectural plan for the Maximilianeum, which was later revised. He was also responsible for the restoration plans for the Gothic castle of Hohenschwangau in Upper Bavaria, which served as the summer residence of the royal couple and later of the queen mother following the king's death.

He was present during the monarch's final moments, which inspired him to author a concise biography of the sovereign.

== Literary works ==
=== La France au temps des croisades ===
In addition to his political activities Vaublanc produced a substantial body of written work throughout his lifetime. From 1844 to 1847, following twelve years of research, he published his magnum opus, La France au temps des croisades, in four volumes. This comprehensive medieval history narrative, comprising over 1,500 pages, was enhanced by illustrations drawn by the author himself.

His work is divided into four parts, each corresponding to a volume: Political and Religious State, Military and Chivalric State, Sciences, Literature, and Arts, and finally Industry and Private Life. According to Bulletin du bibliophile, the style of this work is clear and truthful, avoiding the mistake of taking the form of a novel. (Note: According to Bulletin du bibliophile et du bibliothécaire:...it would be a great injustice not to recognize that La France au temps des croisades is an excellent work, belonging to the same school to which we already owe the Histoire des Français des divers états. The same ardor for truth, the same passion for all the memories of the old French nation, the same tenacity in research, the same clarity of style, and the same novelty of results. M. de Vaublanc, moreover, avoided the main criticism leveled at M. Monteil. He did not feel it necessary to give his narratives a romantic form...)

Illustrations by the viscount in La France au temps des croisades

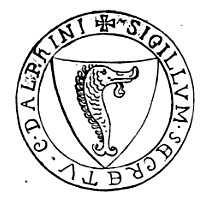
Seal of Guigues VII of Viennois.

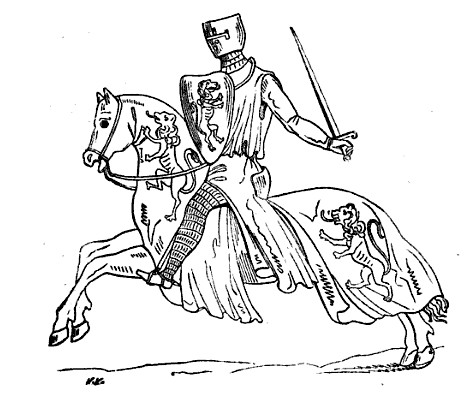
Amaury VI de Montfort.

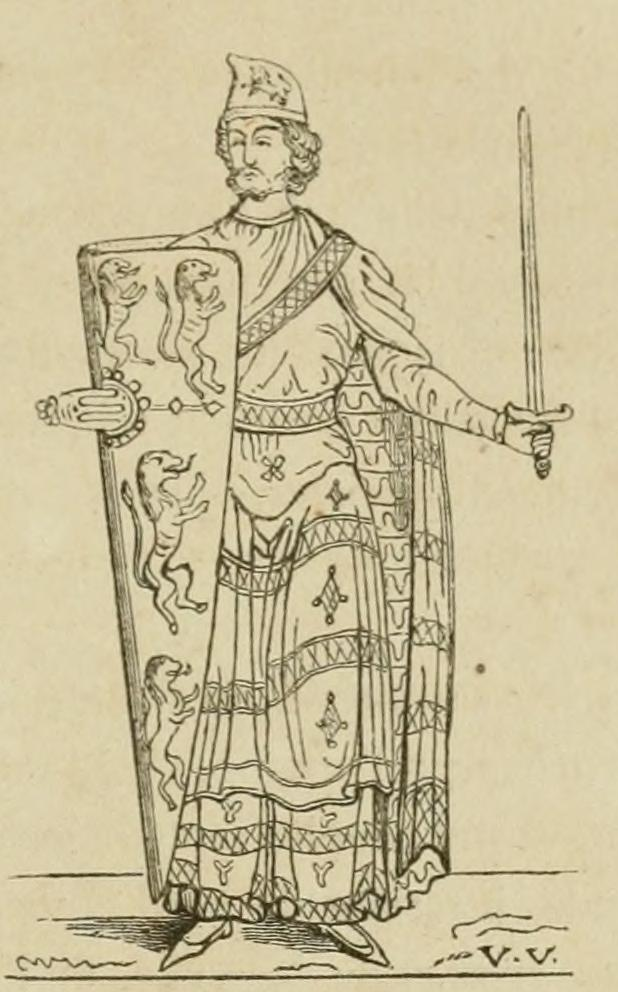
Geoffroy V d'Anjou.

=== Un coup d'œil dans Paris ===
Vaublanc also wrote a book on the architecture of Paris. Published in 1861, it is a critique of Parisian architecture, accompanied by a series of proposals for architectural changes, presented as a walk through the capital. The critic E. de Laqueuille writes, "The book by M. de Vaublanc is one of the best written on the new Paris. It contains, regarding the reconstruction of old Lutetia, on the style of contemporary monuments and their interior decoration, the most learned and tasteful critique we know."

=== Petit voyage à l'exposition ou causerie sur l'exposition universelle de 1867 ===
In 1868 shortly before his death, Vaublanc published his final work, Petit voyage à l'exposition ou causerie sur l'exposition universelle de 1867. This text recounts his experience of the 1867 Universal Exhibition in a humorous tone. As stated in Bulletin du Bibliophile, the work is "the recollections of an ingenious individual who sought to retain his observations and presents them to the reader in the form of informal, unassuming, and unassuming discourses." One might be inclined to cite some lacunae in M. de Vaublanc's work, but he is aware of them. This modest volume, printed in a limited edition, will be preserved by inquisitive readers who may find a more vibrant portrayal of the Exhibition in these concise pages than in many technical works.

=== List of works ===
- de Vaublanc, Vincent-Victor Henri (1844a). La France au temps des croisades ou recherches sur les mœurs et coutumes des français aux XIIe et XIIIe siècles : État politique et religieux. Vol. 1. Paris: J. Tichener. Archived from the original on August 28, 2024.
- de Vaublanc, Vincent-Victor Henri (1844). La France au temps des croisades ou recherches sur les mœurs et coutumes des français aux XIIe et XIIIe siècles : État militaire et chevaleresque. Vol. 2. Paris: J. Tichener. Archived from the original on June 2, 2022.
- de Vaublanc, Vincent-Victor Henri (1847). La France au temps des croisades ou recherches sur les mœurs et coutumes des français aux XIIe et XIIIe siècles : Sciences, littérature et arts. Vol. 3. Paris: J. Tichener. Archived from the original on August 14, 2023.
- de Vaublanc, Vincent-Victor Henri (1847). La France au temps des croisades ou recherches sur les mœurs et coutumes des français aux XIIe et XIIIe siècles : Industrie et vie privée. Vol. 4. Paris: J. Tichener. Archived from the original on August 28, 2024.
- de Vaublanc, Vincent-Victor Henri (1861). Un coup d'œil dans Paris ou observations sur des objets d'art et de goût. Techener.
- de Vaublanc, Vincent-Victor Henri (1867). Maximilien II roi de Bavière. Fragment de souvenirs intimes. Munich. Archived from the original on August 28, 2024.
- de Vaublanc, Vincent-Victor Henri (1868). Petit voyage à l'exposition ou causerie sur l'exposition universelle de 1867. Paris: Léon Techener.

== Decorations ==
- Commander of the Order of the Redeemer (Greece), 1847.
- Knight of the Order of Merit of the Bavarian Crown, 1850.
- Knight of the Order of St. Michael (Bavaria), in 1855, and Grand Cross in 1862.

== See also ==
- Vincent-Marie Viénot, Count of Vaublanc
- Jean-Baptiste Bernard Viénot de Vaublanc

== Bibliography ==
- Association d’études fouriéristes (1994). "Cahiers Charles Fourier". Cahiers Charles Fourier (in French). 5–7: 69.
- Bäumler, Klaus (2012). Henri de Vaublanc : Vorschläge für König Maximilian II, 1851/52; Jakob von Bauer : Ästhetische Rundschau über die Stadt München, 1852. Materialien zur Kulturgeschichte der Stadt München (in German). Munich: Franz Schiermeier Verlag. ISBN 978-3-943866-15-5. Archived from the original on March 15, 2018.
- de Goncourt, Edmond; de Goncourt, Jules (1891). Journal des Goncourt : 1872–1877 (in French). p. 64. Archived from the original on August 28, 2024.
- Hogg, James; Marryat, Florence (1863). "Recollections of Almack's". London Society. London: 153. Archived from the original on October 26, 2017.
- Hugo, Victor (1913). Œuvres complètes (in French). Vol. I. Librairie Ollendorff. p. 164. Archived from the original on August 28, 2024.
- De Laqueuille (1861). Les beaux arts revue nouvelle (in French). Vol. 3.
- Larousse, Pierre (1982). "VAUBLANC Vincent-Victor-Henri, vicomte DE". Grand dictionnaire universel du XIXe siècle (in French).
- Le Moniteur (1846). L'ami de la religion, journal ecclésiastique, politique et littéraire (in French). Vol. 130. p. 77. Archived from the original on February 18, 2018.
- Michaud, Joseph Fr. (1862). Biographie universelle ancienne et moderne, supplément VAN-VIL (in French). Vol. 85. p. 170.
- Paris, Paulin (1845). "Revue littéraire". Bulletin du bibliophile et du bibliothécaire (in French): 280. Archived from the original on October 25, 2017.
- Techener, Léon (1876). "Biographie du vicomte de Vaublanc". Bulletin du bibliophile et du bibliothécaire (in French): 345–371. Archived from the original on October 26, 2017.
- Thiébault, Baron Adolphe (1861). Vingt semaines de séjour à Munich (in French). Paris: E. Dentu. pp. 186–187. Archived from the original on August 28, 2024.
- Vapereau, Gustave (1870). "Vaublanc (Vincent-Victor-Henri vicomte de)". Dictionnaire universel des contemporains (in French). Vol. 2. Archived from the original on February 18, 2018.
- Wanetschek, Margret (1971). Die Grünanlagen in der Stadtplanung Münchens von 1790–1860 (in German). R. Wölfle.
