= Vincent-Marie Viénot, Count of Vaublanc =

French count (1756–1845)

Vincent-Marie Viénot de Vaublanc
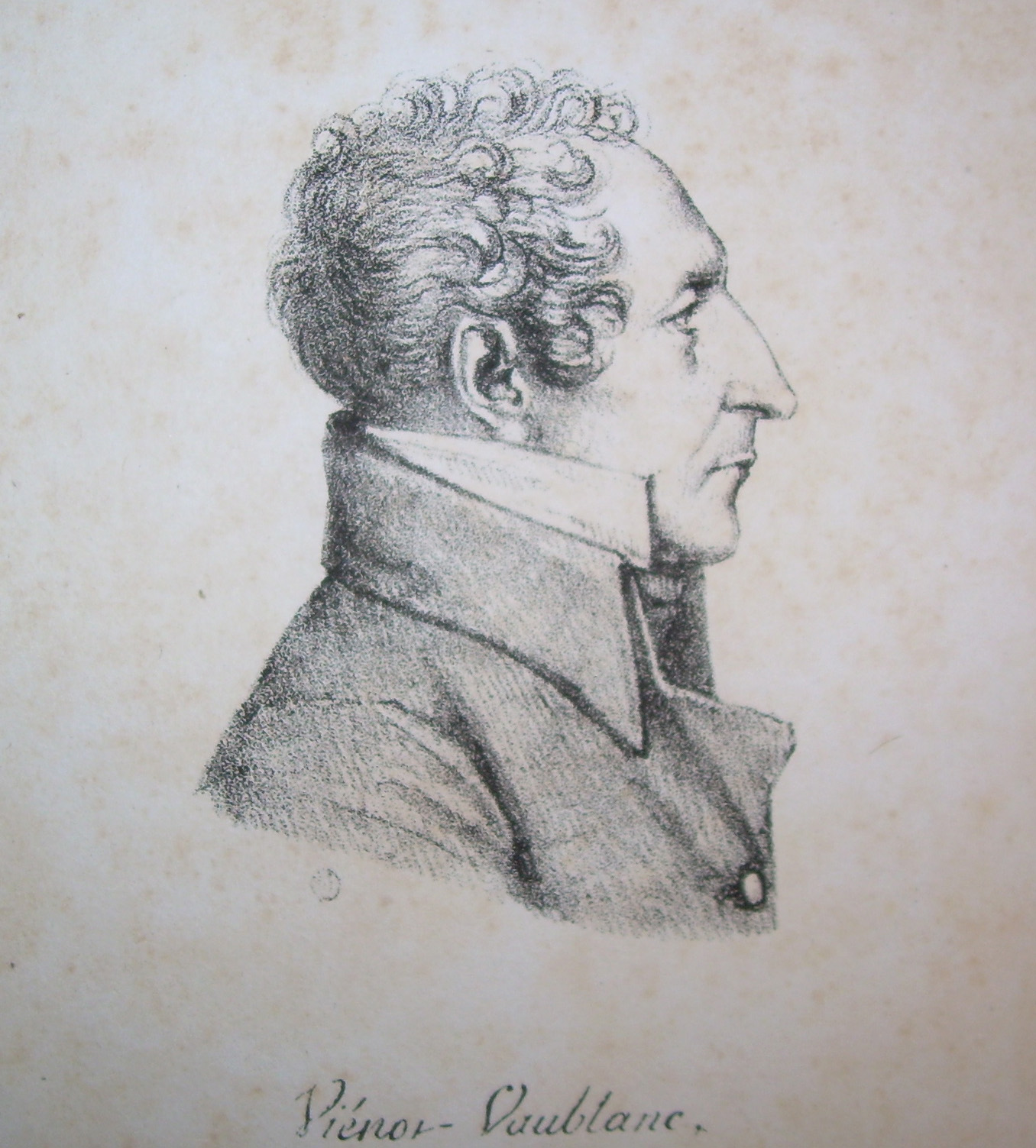

Minister of the Interior
- In office 26 September 1815 – 7 May 1816
- Monarch: Louis XVIII
- Preceded by: Étienne-Denis, baron Pasquier
- Succeeded by: Joseph, vicomte Lainé

Personal details
- Born: 2 March 1756 Fort-Dauphin, Saint-Domingue
- Died: 21 August 1845 (aged 89) Paris, Kingdom of France
- Party: Friends of the Monarchist Constitution (1789–1791); Feuillants Club (1791–1793); Clichy Club (1794–1797); Independent (1797–1815); Ultra-royalist (1815–1830); Legitimist (1830–1845)
- Spouse: Mademoiselle de Fontenelle

Vincent-Marie Viénot de Vaublanc, 1st baron Viénot de Vaublanc and of the Empire (French: [vɛ̃sɑ̃maʁi vjeno d(ə) voblɑ̃]; 2 March 1756 – 21 August 1845), known as the Count de Vaublanc (Comte de Vaublanc, [kɔ̃t d(ə) voblɑ̃]), was a French royalist politician, official, writer and artist. He was a deputy for the Seine-et-Marne department in the French Legislative Assembly, served as president of the same body, and from 26 September 1815 to 7 May 1816, he was Minister of the Interior.

His political career had him rubbing shoulders with Louis XVI, Napoleon, the Count of Artois (the future Charles X), and finally Louis XVIII. He was banished and recalled four times by different regimes, never arrested, succeeding each time in regaining official favour. In a long and eventful career, he was successively a monarchist deputy during the Revolution and under the Directoire, an exile during the Terror, a deputy under Napoleon, Minister of the Interior to Louis XVIII and eventually, at the end of his political career, a simple ultra-royalist deputy.

He is remembered now for the fiery eloquence of his speeches, and for his controversial reorganisation of the Académie Française in 1816 while Minister of the Interior. A man of order, he was a moderate supporter of the Revolution of 1789 and ended his political life under the Restoration as a radical counterrevolutionary.

== Military education under the Ancien Régime ==
Coat of arms of the Vaublanc family

Born and raised at Fort-Dauphin, Saint-Domingue (now Fort-Liberté, Haiti), into an aristocratic family from Burgundy, he was the eldest son of Vivant-François Viénot de Vaublanc, commanding officer of Fort Saint-Louis in Fort-Dauphin. He saw metropolitan France for the first time at the age of seven.

After military education at the Prytanée National Militaire in La Flèche, and at the École Militaire in Paris from 1770 to 1774, he was decorated with the Order of Saint Lazarus (before he had even set foot outside the school) by the Comte de Provence, the future Louis XVIII, Grand Master of the Order.

He was admitted as second-lieutenant to the Régiment de la Sarre, which was controlled by the Duc de Liancourt from 1776 to 1782, and in which his uncle Charles was lieutenant-colonel. He was garrisoned successively at Metz, at Rouen and at Lille, before obtaining lettres de service for Saint-Domingue to attend to family affairs.

There he married one Mademoiselle de Fontenelle, and returned to France in 1782 with a daughter. He purchased the office of lieutenant des maréchaux de France for Dammarie-les-Lys, near Melun, and a house in the region, giving his profession as gentleman-farmer.

The responsibility of his station was to act as arbiter in legal disputes which involved points of honour, and this permitted him to make the acquaintance of a number of aristocrats in the region. It also gave him the time to study agriculture, literature and the arts.

== Political career during the French Revolution ==
=== Convocation of the French States-General (1789–1791) ===
Seduced at first by the new ideas of the Revolution, he threw himself into a political career by becoming an aristocratic member of the bailliage of Melun in 1789. He was elected secretary of this assembly, under its president M. de Gouy d'Arcy, grand bailli of Melun, a fellow member of the famous explorer Louis Antoine de Bougainville. The Assembly was assigned the task of drawing up a list of grievances to be submitted to the King and naming a deputy to the States-General. Vaublanc supported Fréteau de Saint-Just, an elected député de la noblesse for the bailliage of Melun who was to become a member of the National Constituent Assembly.

In 1790, Vaublanc became a member and later president of the conseil général of Seine-et-Marne. This gave him the right to preside over the administrative directory of this département.

=== Losing ground to the Jacobins under the Legislative Assembly (1791) ===
After the dissolution of the Constituent Assembly, the electoral colleges reconvened to elect new deputies. Vaublanc was elected president of that of Seine-et-Marne. On 1 September 1791, he was elected deputy of Seine-et-Marne at the Legislative Assembly, the eighth out of eleven, by 273 votes out of 345. He was one of the few to have any political experience, notably on the question of the Antilles, in an assembly composed essentially of political novices. Faithful to their promises, not one former member of the Constituent Assembly had been admitted.

=== A leader of the Club des Feuillants (1791–1792) ===
From this point on, he took the name of Viénot-Vaublanc, which he retained until the end of the First Empire in 1814.

From the very moment of his appearance, he made himself conspicuous by delivering a speech which denounced the humiliating terms on which Louis XVI was to be received by the Assembly the next day. As a result of these statements, he was elected president from 15 November to 28 November 1791 by the assembly, the majority of whom were royalist.

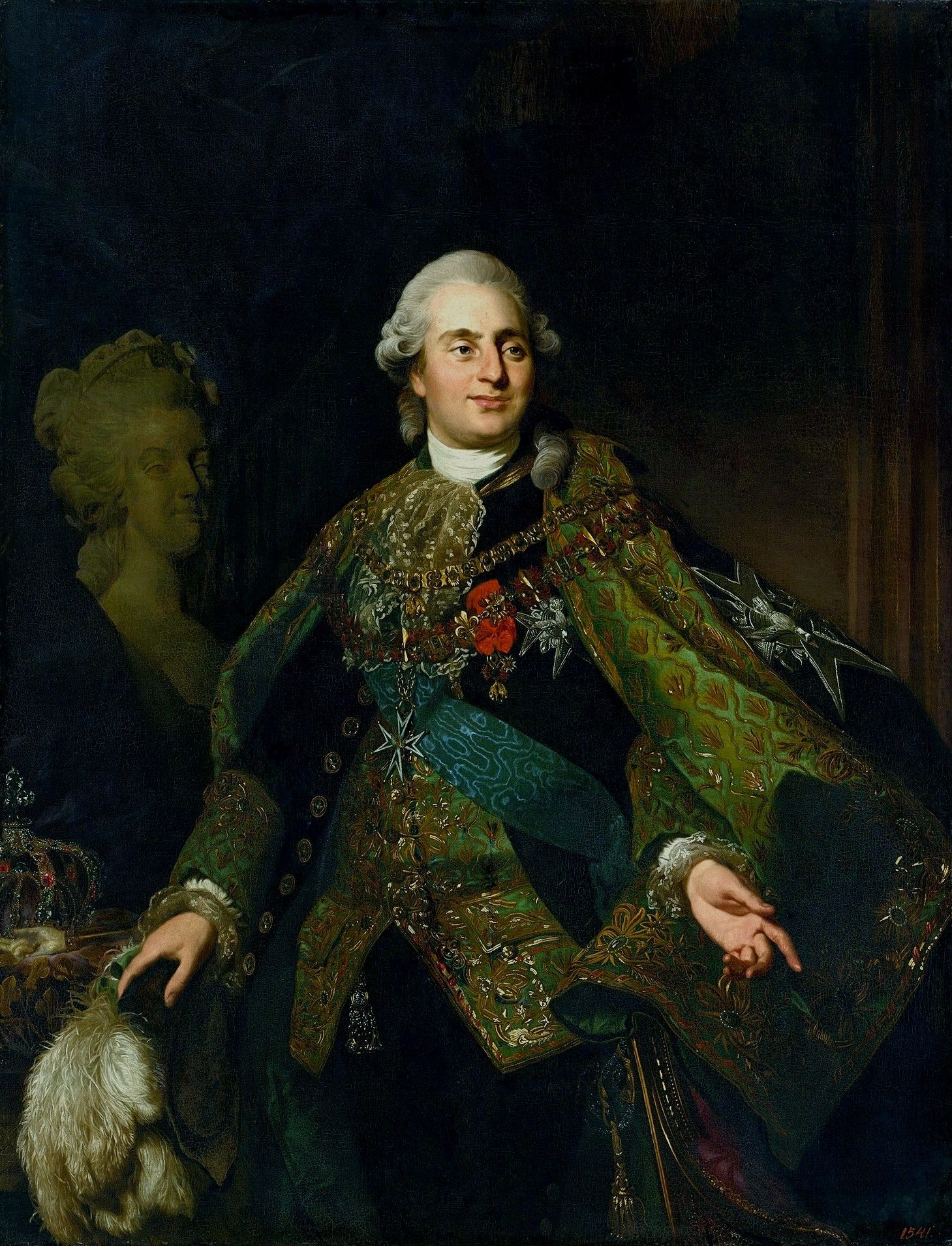
Louis XVI

On 29 November, Vaublanc was assigned the task of composing a message to the King, asking him to withdraw his veto of the decree of 9 November, a decree designed to slow the massive emigrations (then encouraged by the priests and the nobility) by threatening reprisals against German princes who continued to offer refuge to the armies of French noblemen (such as those of the Comte d'Artois, and of the Prince of Condé). The assembly was so pleased with his work that they asked him to read it to the King personally. Louis XVI replied that he would take the request into serious consideration, and, several days later, personally announced his decision on the matter.

On this occasion Vaublanc made a name for himself by informing the assembly "that the King had made the first bow, and he had only returned the gesture." The anecdote reveals the shift in constitutional forces: the legislative power, embodied in the Legislative Assembly, was clearly ascendant over the executive, embodied in Louis XVI, who was now no more than the "King of the French" or roi des français.

Vaublanc now sided with the constitutional monarchists and joined the Amis de la Constitution (dubbed the Club des Feuillants) with 263 other colleagues out of the 745 deputies. He became one of its principal figures, along with Jacques Claude Beugnot, Mathieu Dumas and Jaucourt, after the departure of Barnave and C. Lameth. He vigorously opposed revolutionary governments and was characterised by his loyalty to the King, his opposition to repressive measures against rebellious priests and to laws confiscating the goods of émigrés, and his denunciation of the massacres at Avignon. Debate became steadily more extreme. The crowds attending these debates often shouted at him (as they did at Charles de Lacretelle) "À la lanterne!" Nicolas de Condorcet, his hostile colleague in the Legislative Assembly in 1791, said of him: "There are, at all meetings, these noisy air-headed orators, who produce a great effect through the constant repetition of redundant inanities." Brissot, one of the chief Girondists in the Legislative Assembly, nicknamed him le chef des bicaméristes.

=== The fall of the monarchy (1792) ===
In 1792, he defended the Comte de Rochambeau before the Assembly and obtained his acquittal. Following the majority of the Assembly who sought to abolish slavery in the Antilles, he nevertheless took aim in a speech of 20 March at those hardline abolitionists like Brissot who knew little of life in the colonies and of the risks of civil war given the diversity of ethnicities and social conflicts in Saint-Domingue. He supported the law of 4 April 1792 which granted citizenship to all "coloured men and free Negroes". At the meeting of 10 April, he declared himself in favour of the progressive abolition of the slave trade throughout the colonies, following the examples of Denmark and Great Britain.

On 3 May 1792, he supported the proposition of Beugnot which provoked an accusatory decree from Marat and the abbé Royou, and on 8 May, at the Assembly, he addressed the Jacobins in these terms: "You wish, sirs, to save the Constitution; and yet, you cannot do so without beating down factions and the factious, without setting everything besides the rule of law to one side, without dying with the Law and for the Law, and I declare that I shall not be the last who shall die with you, in order to see it preserved; believe it, sirs...."

On 18 June, he was elected a member of the Commission des douze (Committee of Twelve), created by Marat to examine the State of France and to propose means of preserving the Constitution, liberty, and the Empire. He gave his resignation on 30 July.

==== The defence of La Fayette ====
Following the events of 20 June 1792, La Fayette arrived in Paris on 28 June, hoping to convince the King to leave in order to head the armies assembled in the north. At the head of the National Guard, he tried to close down the political clubs, but his attempt failed, partly because of the Court's refusal to support him. In reaction to this, the left wing of the Assembly decided to charge Lafayette with treason.

On 8 August 1792, ill at ease and shocked by the course of events, Vaublanc delivered a speech before the Assembly, in which he defended, vigorously, and courageously, against the lively opposition of the Jacobins who dominated the Assembly and of the man in the street, General La Fayette, who stood accused of violating the Constitution. He later claimed to have succeeded (with the help of Quatremère de Quincy) in rallying 200 undecided deputies to his position. La Fayette was acquitted, by 406 votes out of 630.

On departure, Vaublanc and about thirty other deputies were threatened, insulted and jostled by the hostile crowd which had attended the debate. Some deputies even took refuge in the guardroom of the Royal Palace, later exiting through the windows. Hippolyte Taine wrote: "After the principal defender of La Fayette, M. de Vaublanc, had been assaulted three times, he took the precaution of not immediately returning home; but the rabble besieged his house, shouting that eighty citizens must die by their hands, and that he should be the first; twelve men climbed to his apartment, ransacked it, and continued the search in neighbouring houses, hoping for members of his family if he himself could not be seized; he was informed that if he returned to his domicile he would be slaughtered."

As a result, on 9 August, Vaublanc asked for the removal of the fédérés and marseillais. The request was rejected by a majority of the Assembly.

==== 10 August ====
On 10 August 1792, the day that marked the downfall of the Legislative Assembly and the Monarchy at the hands of the Paris Commune, he witnessed from his carriage the toppling of the statue of Louis XIV in what is now the Place Vendôme. He enjoined the Assembly to leave Paris for royalist Rouen to escape the revolutionary pressures, and he avoided an assassination attempt when he was narrowly saved from a sabre cut by a young officer of genius, Captain Louis Bertrand de Sivray, who was to make a name for himself as general.

He was one of the eyewitnesses of the arrival of the Royal Family, who, after the March on the Tuileries, placed themselves under the protection of the Legislative Assembly at the Place du Carrousel. The incident is described in his memoirs.

=== Exiled during the Convention and the Reign of Terror (1792–1795) ===
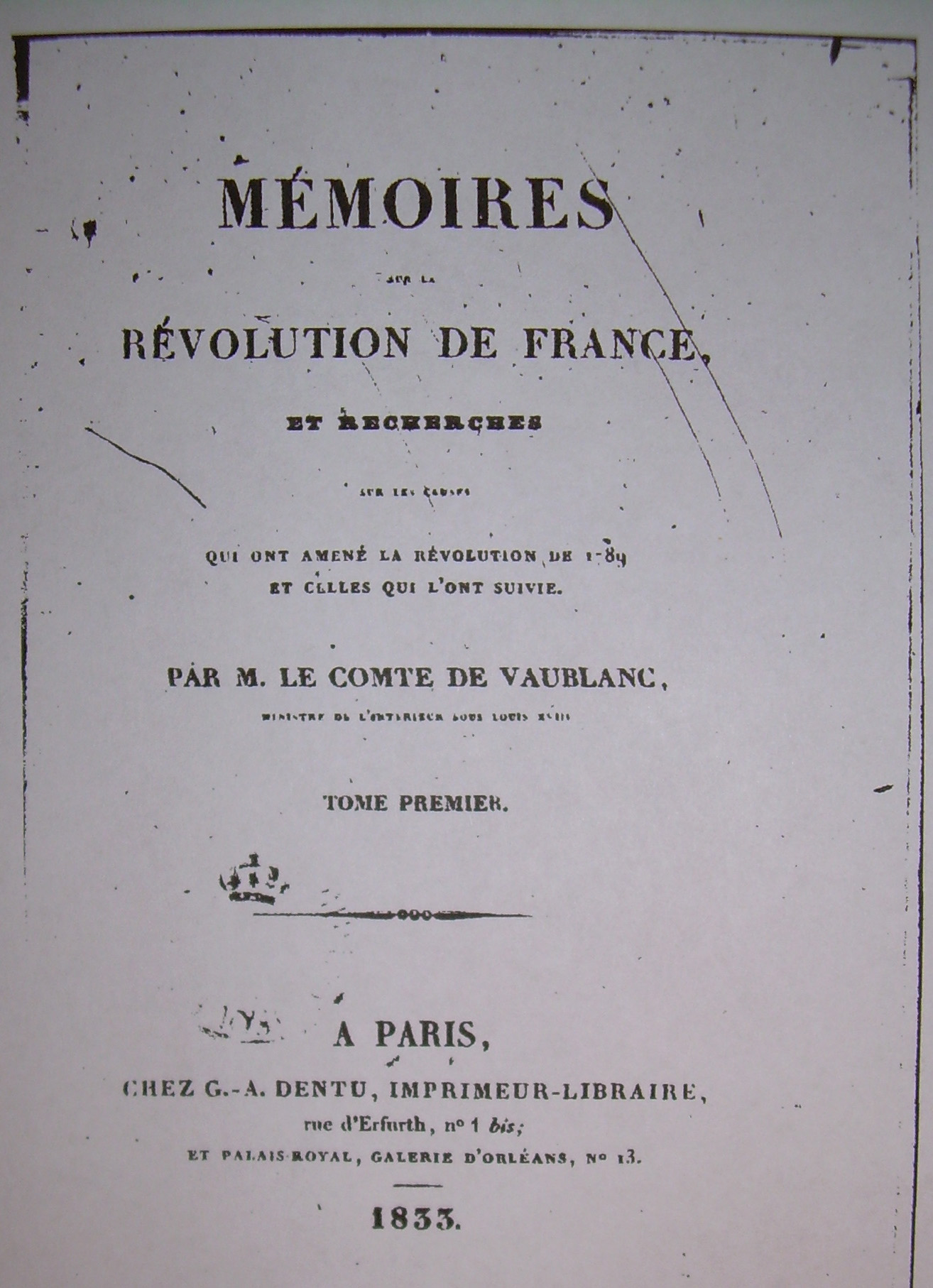

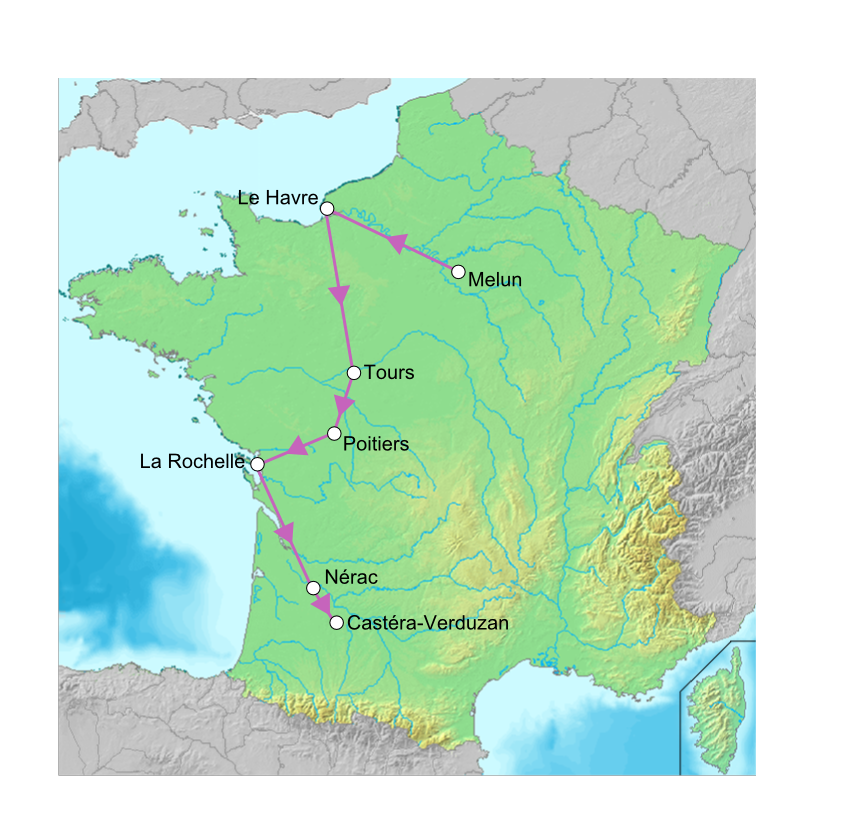

The second volume of his memoirs provides insight into the general atmosphere at the time of the Terror, as felt by an aristocratic royalist, who was at risk of being arrested at any moment and finishing up on the scaffold, and yet forced to travel back and forth over the territory of the brand new French Republic.

On the evening of 10 August he was obliged to take refuge at the home of Armand-Gaston Camus, the Assembly's archivist. Several days later he moved to the Hotel Strasbourg, on the rue Neuve Saint Eustache. On 3 September 1792, hearing a commotion in the courtyard, he thought himself betrayed; but it was in fact the passage of a rabble brandishing the head of the Princesse de Lamballe on a pole.

The Committee of Public Safety, newly established, published a decree in which it was revealed that he was on the list of outlaws drawn up by the Municipality of Paris. This forced him to leave the city, first for Normandy, where he reunited with his family, then for his country house at Bélombres near Melun. He lived in hiding for several months; it was there that he learnt that the newspaper Gorsas accused him among others of having "accepted 300,000 francs from the Queen for the purpose of organising the Counter-Revolution in Provence", and that he "met with them secretly."

The Law of Suspects went to the vote on 17 September 1793. His name appeared within. A revolutionary detachment came and ransacked his house, and he "fled by the highways" entirely on foot, throwing himself on the mercy of chance. He wandered from inn to inn, entering (he later wrote) every town in a terror of being recognised, especially when going to local authorities in order to get his passport stamped.

At the trial of Marie Antoinette, on 14 October and 16 October 1793, his name appeared next to that of Jaucourt in the papers of the prosecutors.

Opting at first for the south of France, and Bordeaux in particular, he changed direction after having learnt of the ferocious oppression led there by Tallien, the convention's representative, and the dangers that travel in those regions entailed. He passed through Poitiers, and La Rochelle, where he stayed for one month. Wishing to avoid taking the risk of enlisting in the National Guard, where he could well be recognised, he feigned illness and obtained a medical certificate which would allow him to take a thermal cure at Castéra-Verduzan in the Gers region. To allay suspicions, he took the precaution of regularly pricking his gums in order to simulate "incurable scurvy." It was while at this spa that he learnt of the fall of Robespierre on 27 July 1794. He waited four months for his proscription to be lifted before returning to Paris.

=== A counterrevolutionary activist under the Directory (1795–1799) ===
On his return to Paris in the spring of 1795, he published his "Reflections on the foundations of a constitution" (Réflexions sur les bases d'une constitution), under the pseudonym of L.-P. de Ségur, tabled by his friend Bresson, then a deputy at the National Convention. In this work, he advocated the creation of two parliamentary chambers instead of one (as was the case under the convention), in the belief that having only one chamber had been one of the causes of the Terror. He also advocated the installation of a single person as head of the Executive, for the sake of efficiency, as opposed to the Directory's five.

After the appearance of this book, the committee entrusted with the drawing up of the Constitution of Year III (comprising Daunou and François-Antoine de Boissy d'Anglas) invited him to elaborate on his theories, but he refused. His ideas were nevertheless broadly followed, and two chambers representing the Legislature saw the light of day with the names "Council of Ancients (Elders)" and "Council of Five Hundred" (Conseil des Anciens and Conseil des Cinq-Cents).

Opposed to the Decree of Two Thirds, he took on an active rôle with Antoine Chrysostome Quatremère de Quincy at the time of the insurrection of 13 Vendemaire IV (5 October 1795). On this occasion, he discovered the tactical genius of Bonaparte, who became known as le général Vendémiaire. He was a member of the central royalist committee entrusted with replacing the convention.

On 17 October, as head of the royalist faction of the Faubourg Poissonnière, he was condemned to death in absentia by a military commission presided over by General Lostange, which had its headquarters at the Théâtre-Français. This obliged him to go into hiding for a second time, mostly at the residence of Sophie Cottin, a friend of Bresson's wife. He took advantage of his stay there by making sketches of Cottin.

Several days later, the convention, forced to hold new elections, assembled the electoral colleges. This election brought a majority of royalists into the Senate and into the Council of 500. The college of Melun elected Vaublanc as deputy for Seine-et-Marne and as a member of the Council of 500; however he had to wait for his friends Desfourneaux and Pastoret to overturn his sentence (by reason of unconstitutionality). This was made easier because of the fear inspired in the Assembly by Conspiration des Égaux at the end of August 1796. On 2 September 1796, he delivered the famous speech "I swear hatred for royalty!" which, according to legend, was interrupted by a highlander who shouted "Speak up!" — to which Vaublanc responded instantly: "Keep it down!"

The elections of Year V (May 1797), in which one third of the representatives were replaced, turned the tables in favour of the royalists, who achieved a majority in both chambers. On 20 May 1797 (20 prairial V), Charles Pichegru was elected president of the Council of 500 and Barbé-Marbois of the Council of Elders. Vaublanc himself was named membre du bureau of the Council of 500. On the same day, the Legislature proceeded to replace the republican Director, Le Tourneur (who had gained the position by drawing straws), with the moderate royalist François de Barthélémy, at that time the French ambassador to Switzerland. Vaublanc voted against his nomination, preferring General Beurnonville, who was known for his forcefulness.

The new majority supported freedom of the press, which allowed attacks on the Directory to be made with impunity. The Club de Clichy, of which Vaublanc was a prominent member, began to control the two councils, and directly threatened the Directory. He was appointed to their committee of inspectors, and given the rôle of policing the councils and maintaining their security from within. As a result, he had the power to give orders to the councils' brigadiers.

The Directory, cornered, counterattacked with the 80,000-strong army of Sambre-et-Meuse, which approached Paris under the command of Hoche. At the same time, Vaublanc pleaded for and obtained from the council an order dissolving all clubs, including those of the Jacobins.

On 16 July 1797, under pressure from the councils, the three republican directors, Barras, Reubell and La Reveillière-Lépeaux, ordered a ministerial reshuffle disadvantaging the royalists. On 3 September, Vaublanc, with his colleague Admiral Louis Thomas Villaret de Joyeuse and other clichiens, was a hair's breadth from achieving a coup d'état against the triumvirate of republican directors. Their plan, which convinced the director Lazare Nicolas Marguerite Carnot, was simple. Vaublanc was charged with delivering a speech on 4 September before the Council of 500 which would demand the impeachment of the triumvirate. Meanwhile, General Pichegru, who had been persuaded by Carnot to join the conspiracy at the head of the Legislature's Guard, would come to arrest the directors.

Unfortunately for him, General Bonaparte, then head of the Armée d'Italie, intercepted a royalist agent, Louis-Alexandre de Launay, comte d'Antraigues, in possession of documents revealing the conspiracy and the treason of Pichegru. He sent General Pierre Augereau and his army to Paris, where the general advertised the treason with posters in the streets. The principal conspirators were either arrested and deported to Guyana (like Pichegru and Barthélémy), or forced to flee (like Carnot and Vaublanc). The latter managed to escape the city limits of Paris, which was then still in a state of siege, by hiding in a carriage. This escape was achieved through the connivance of Rochambeau. Vaublanc made it to Italy with the help of various disguises; on his way he passed through Switzerland, where he stayed with his friend Pastoret.

== Under Napoleon ==
The coup d'état of 18 Brumaire VIII (10 November 1799), and the accession to power of the Consulat, which gave amnesty to the proscribed, permitted him to return to France, where he was presented to Bonaparte.

=== Deputy to the Corps législatif (1800–1805) ===
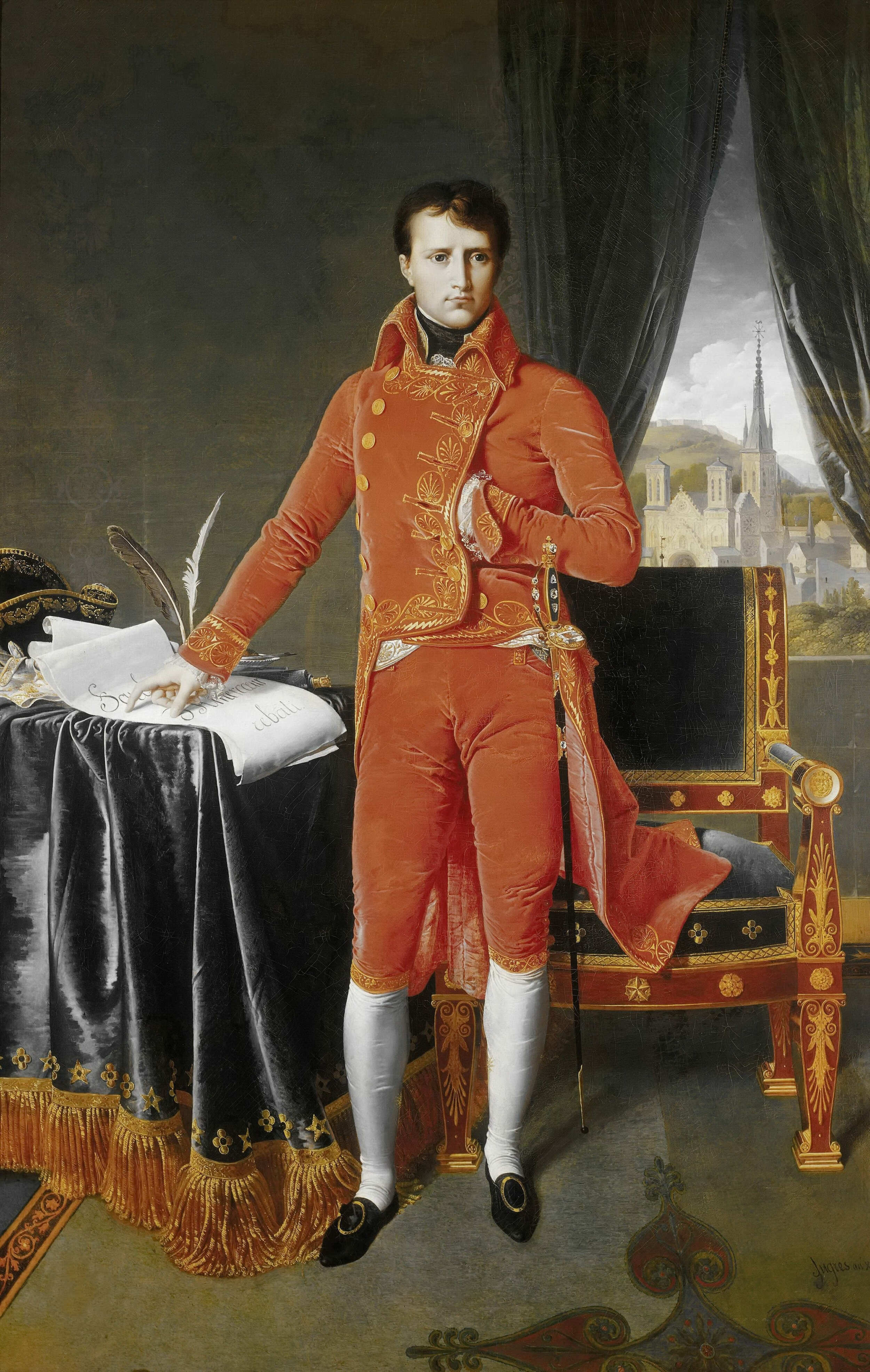
Bonaparte, First Consul, in a painting by Ingres.

In 1800, Vaublanc was elected by the conservative Senate to be deputy for Calvados, one of 300 members of the Legislature (Corps législatif), and to fulfil the duties of questeur for a five-year term. Among those duties was that of issuing regular reports on the consulate for the rest of his life.

The admiration and respect which he felt towards Napoleon for having "reestablished order in France and put an end to the persecution of priests" can be seen in several of his speeches at this time: for example that of 24 floréal X to the consuls, in his capacity as deputy to the Legislature, a speech which is flattering to the First Consul, or that of 24 nivôse XIII (13 January 1805), this time delivered before Napoléon I, who had in the meantime become empereur des français, when together with Jean-Pierre Louis de Fontanes, Acting President of the Legislature, Vaublanc attended the inauguration of a marble statue of the Emperor in the hall of the Legislature, which had been commissioned to honour the "father of the Civil Code."

He was President of the Legislature from 21 April to 7 May 1803.

On 4 November 1804, Pope Pius VII stayed the night at Vaublanc's house in Montargis, 28 rue de Loing, while travelling to Paris for the coronation of the Emperor.

=== Prefect of Moselle (1805–1814) ===
At the end of his term as deputy, in 1805 the electoral college of Seine-et-Marne put him up as a candidate for the Senate, but he was not retained. Interested by the administrative and territorial reorganisations that were taking place, he managed to obtain a prefecture, and on 1 February 1805 at Metz he was named préfet de la Moselle (prefect or chief administrator of the département of Moselle). He became known for his activism and for his habit of roaming his département on horseback and not by stagecoach as was customary for prefects.

Napoleon rewarded him for his zeal: he was made Commander of the Légion d'honneur, knighted on 28 November 1809, made baron d'Empire on 19 December 1809 (a hereditary title), and was bestowed on 17 July 1810 with a majorat in Hannover. In June of that year he had an audience with the Emperor at the time of his passage through Metz, during which, according to the third volume of his Memoirs, he strongly objected to the idea of a campaign against Russia. During the campaign of 1813, after the withdrawal of the Mainz Army from Leipzig, a large number of wounded soldiers took refuge in Metz, resulting in a typhoid epidemic of which Vaublanc fell victim; he escaped death narrowly.

In 1814, he opened the gates of Metz to welcome the coalition forces.

== Under Louis XVIII ==
=== For the First Restoration and against the Hundred Days (1814–1815) ===
Maintained as Prefect of Moselle after the First Restoration, he was made an officier of the Legion of Honour on 23 August 1814. After the return of Napoleon he kept Metz loyal to Louis XVIII and, with Marshal Oudinot, the military governor of Metz, he attempted to hinder any Bonapartist rallies. An ordre d'arrestation, published by Marshal Davout in Le Moniteur Universel, forced him to flee towards Luxembourg, joining Louis XVIII at Ghent.

It is said that, on meeting the officer assigned to arrest him, he said: "Do not worry about me. Better worry about your own self; no-one must see you leaving by the large courtyard", and led him to a side exit before galloping away on his horse.

On his arrival, he encountered Chateaubriand, who mentions him in his Mémoires d'Outre-tombe: "M. de Vaublanc and M. Capelle joined us. The former said he had everything he could possibly need in his portfolio. You want Montesquieu? here you go; Bossuet? there you are." He submitted to the King, via the Comte d'Artois, several essays on the state of the country, and predicted that His Majesty "would be on his way back to Paris in two months or less."

After the Second Restoration, in order to thank him for his loyalty Louis XVIII named him State Councillor on the spot, and, on 27 December 1815, Grand Officer of the Legion of Honour. In July, he sent him to Marseille to be Prefect of Bouches-du-Rhône, and to liberate five to six hundred Bonapartist prisoners, a surprising act which was appropriate under the circumstances (Marseille being under English control, and convulsed by anti-Bonapartist violence).

=== Ultra-royalist Minister of the Interior (1815–1816) ===
Wishing to live down his Bonapartist past, while Minister of the Interior he removed the letter N from the bridges of Paris.

On 26 September 1815, thanks largely to the support of his friend the Comte d'Artois, the King named him Minister of the Interior and of Public Instruction. The new President of the council, the Duc de Richelieu, who had been forced to nominate him, had a ruling on his nomination suspended, but he was not quick enough and on hearing the good news Vaublanc wasted no time in establishing himself firmly in his new ministry.

This nomination demonstrates the influence that the Comte d'Artois exercised over the governments of his brother. He kept a rival court at the Marsan Pavilion and sought to restore Absolutism by rolling back the innovations that had been ushered in by the Revolution.

Rudolf von Thadden, a contemporary German historian, summed up the comments of Martignac on 2 April 1829 by saying that his nomination was due more to his background than to his talents.

==== Breathless devotion ====
Vaublanc, at the head of his ministry, engaged immediately in Counter-Revolutionary activity that was so frenetic that even the King was to be describe it as "breathless devotion". On the tabling by the Keeper of the Seals of a law that would reestablish cours prévôtales or "special courts" before the Chamber of Deputies (nicknamed the Chambre introuvable), Vaublanc shouted out: "France wants its King!" To great applause, both the deputies and the public gallery rose to their feet and repeated "Yes, France wants its King!"

On 2 October 1815, one of his first measures was to send out a circular to all the departmental prefects informing them of their priorities in this troubled time: "The very first priority should be given to the maintenance of order (...) true vigilance foresees disorderliness and renders the use of force unnecessary." He used his powers to lock down the prefectural system to the advantage of the royalists, by transferring or sacking twenty-two prefects. By the end of his incumbency not one prefect even slightly implicated in the events of the Hundred Days was still in office.

On 18 November, he signed a statute that replaced the general staff of the National Guard with a committee of three Inspectors-General who were the members of the council of the Colonel-General — none other than the Comte d'Artois. The statute also removed the right of the other ministers to review any nominations to these positions. This permitted the Ultras to infiltrate the organisation more easily.

By a statute of 13 January 1816, he shortened the terms of mayors and deputy-mayors by two years; Vaublanc explained this measure to a prefect thus: "By accelerating the turn-over of mayors and deputy-mayors, you must get those people out of the way who, without a formal recall, would continue in a station to which they appear ill-suited."

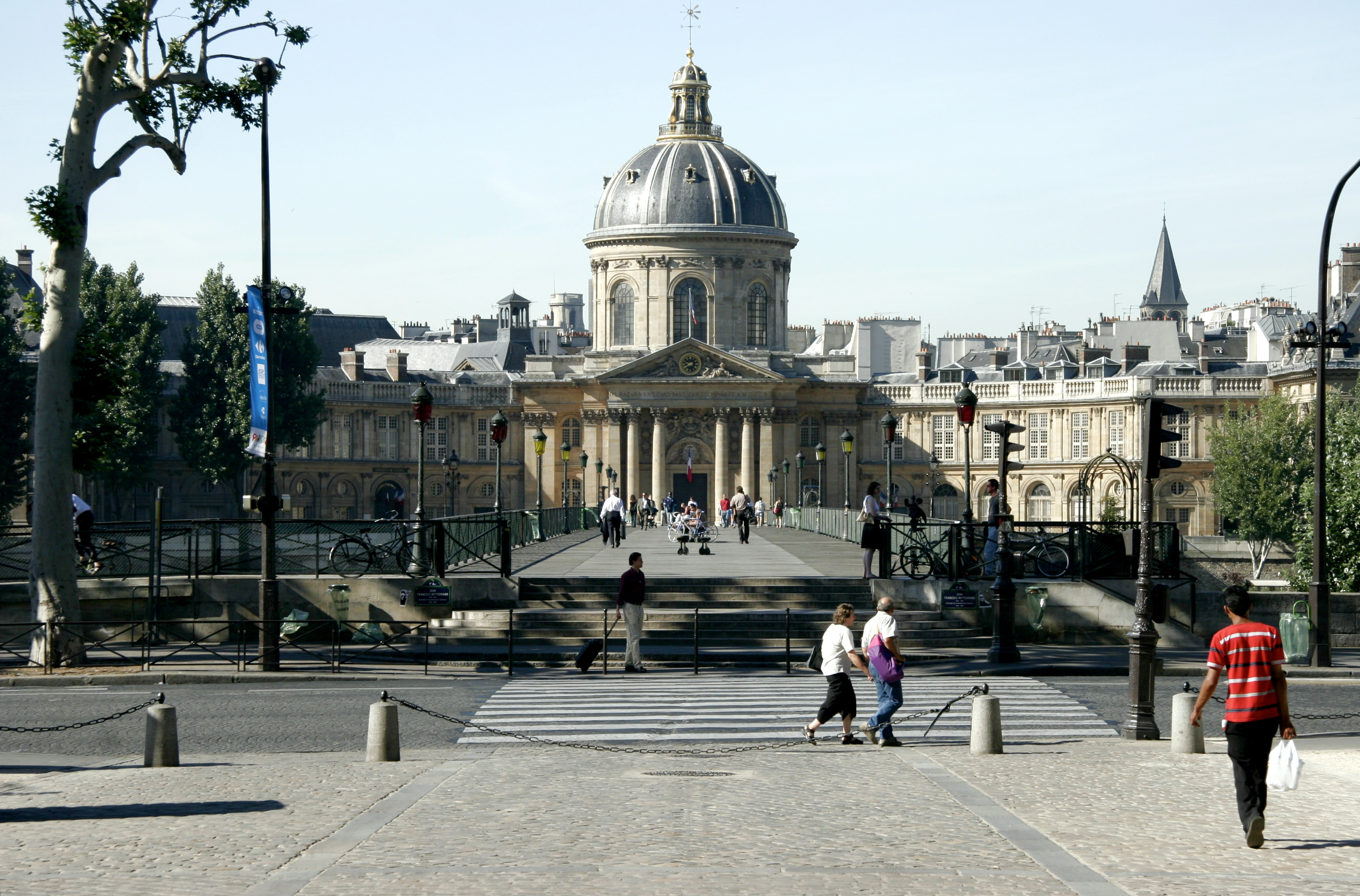
The Institut de France, of which the Académie française forms part

In countersigning the statute of 21 March 1816, he aided the controversial reorganisation of the Institut de France, perhaps persuaded by a letter from Jean Baptiste Antoine Suard, secretary in perpetuity of the Académie française: "I can never tire of repeating that there is manifest in this institute a remnant of the Revolutionary spirit, whose influence must urgently be quelled by wise foresight working through statutes which you shall put into effect"; this statute gave him the direct power to name nine of the eleven academicians.

This radical submission of academia to "royal benevolence" met a mixed reception. In particular, the liberals reproached him for replacing the poet Antoine Vincent Arnault with the Duc de Richelieu, Pierre Louis Roederer with the Duc de Lévis, and Charles-Guillaume Etienne with the Comte Choiseul-Gouffier. The new académiciens had no significant literary achievements. This affair earned him the nickname Maupeou de la littérature.

Throughout this time of purging, he proposed the creation of a Ministry of Fine Arts for Chateaubriand, but this idea was turned down by the Duc de Richelieu. On 6 April 1816 Vaublanc was elected membre libre of the Academy of Fine Arts, from which he had ousted the painter Jacques-Louis David.

==== Fall from grace ====
In his capacity as Minister of the Interior, he had to draft a new electoral law. Vaublanc proposed, without much enthusiasm (and with the precedent of Article 37 from the Charter of 1814), an annual re-election of one fifth of the Chamber according to a two-tier system aimed at keeping the Chamber in Royalist hands. This proposal was rejected by the Chamber of Deputies, on 3 April 1816, by 89 votes to 57. Hoping to stay in power as long as possible, the Chamber tabled a counter-proposal involving a general election every five years, which in turn was rejected by the Government. As a result of the impasse, France briefly had no electoral law.

On 10 April 1816, to a full house, the Police Minister Decazes heckled him: "You are nothing more than the Minister of the Comte d'Artois and you want to be more powerful than the Ministers of the King!" Vaublanc responded scathingly: "If I were more powerful than you, I would make full use of those powers to have you charged with high treason for you are, M. Decazes, indeed a traitor both to King and country."

On 13 April 1816, he aided the expulsion of some students from the Polytechnic, perpetrators of "disturbances and indiscipline", the majority in fact being Bonapartists who were being expelled for political reasons.

France's allies, still present in the country, became uneasy about the dissensions within the French government. The Russian Ambassador, a Corsican named Carlo Andrea Pozzo di Borgo, went so far as to blame Vaublanc for a large part of it: "One of the principal sources of the disorder has been the heterogeneous composition of the ministry; the defection of that of the Interior has greatly weakened the authority and the influence of the Crown on the Chambers."

The battle of personalities within the Ministry of the Interior (Vaublanc versus Richelieu and Decazes), the tight links between Vaublanc and the future Charles X, the hysterical outburst of 10 April, and Vaublanc's report to the King in which he absurdly insisted on "the indispensability of a firmer and more resolute pace" all led to his downfall.

Richelieu demanded that the King dismiss Vaublanc, threatening to resign if he did not. The King finally acquiesced, and, when he asked for the statute so he could countersign it, the episode (according to the account of Louis-Mathieu Molé) descended into farce.

Replaced by Joseph Louis Joachim Lainé shortly after the failure of his plans for electoral reform, he left on 8 May 1816, the same day as the Minister of Justice, François Barbé-Marbois, who had been sacked at the insistence of the Comte d'Artois in a tit-for-tat deal. The King recompensed Vaublanc with the titles of State Minister and Member of the Privy Council.

== Deputy of the Chamber (1820–1827) and afterwards ==
On 13 November 1820 he was elected to the Chamber as deputy for Calvados. He was re-elected on 10 October 1821, became a vice-president of the Chamber during the 1822 session, was re-elected again on 6 March 1824, but lost in 1827.

He was at the same time selected to be deputy for Guadeloupe, where he was the co-proprietor of a sugar plantation in the parish of Basse-terre. In this capacity he recommended several changes in the judiciary and in the administration of the colonies, including the construction of storehouses.

With two of his colleagues in the chamber, Comte de la Breteche and Baron de Vitrolles, he oversaw some ultra-royalist periodicals, starting with La Quotidienne and Le Drapeau Blanc.

In January 1823, he came out in favour of the Spanish Expedition, and was named a member of the board of inquiry, presided over by Marshal Étienne Macdonald.

He had just been reappointed to the State Council (on 25 July) with the written promise of a peerage, when the statues of July 1830 deposed Charles X. He retired from public life after the accession of Louis Philippe I and worked on his memoirs until his sight failed. He died at the age of eighty-nine, on 21 August 1845, in Paris at his house on the rue du Bac.

== Works by Viénot de Vaublanc ==
- 1792 Rapport sur les honneurs et récompenses militaires, le 28 janvier 1792, fait à l'Assemblée nationale, au nom du Comité d'instruction publique.
- 1795 Réflexions sur les bases d'une constitution under the pseudonym L.-P. de Segur.
- 1808 Rivalité de la France et de l'Angleterre.
- 1818 Tables synchroniques de l'histoire de France.
- 1819 Le dernier des Césars ou la chute de l'Empire romain d'Orient.
- 1822 Du commerce de la France en 1820 et 1821.
- 1828 Des administrations provinciales et municipales.
- 1833 Mémoires sur la Révolution de France et recherches sur les causes qui ont amené la Révolution de 1789 et celles qui l'ont suivie (4 volumes). Paris: G.A. Dentu. Article about the work, Wikipedia (fr). Online edition (photographed), Gallica
- 1833 Essai sur l'instruction et l'éducation d'un prince au XIXeme siècle, destiné au duc de Bordeaux.
- 1838 Fastes mémorables de la France.
- 1839 Souvenirs (2 volumes).
- 1839 Soliman II, Attila, Aristomène (tragedies).
- 1843 De la navigation des colonies.

== Additional bibliography ==
- Chateaubriand François-René de. Mémoires d'outre-tombe. Paris: Penaud, 1848–50. Digital edition, Gallica
- Lever, Evelyne. Louis XVIII. Collection Pluriel. Paris: Fayard, 2012 (1988). ISBN 978-2818502808.
- Michaud, Louis-Gabriel. Biographie universelle ancienne et moderne. 2. udg. Paris: Desplaces, 1843–65. "Vaublanc", 2 entries, vol 43, pp 10–16. Online edition (photographed), Gallica
- Mignet, François-Auguste. Histoire de la révolution française depuis 1789 jusqu'en 1814. Paris: Firmin Didot, 1824.
- Robert, Adolphe, and Gaston Cougny. Dictionnaire des parlementaires français de 1789 à 1889. Paris: Edgar Bourloton, 1889–1891. "Vincent Marie Viénot de Vaublanc" entry. Database of parliamentarians since 1789, Assemblée Nationale, see "Biographie"
- Schama, Simon. Citizens: A Chronicle of the French Revolution. New York: Random House, 1989. ISBN 978-0394559483.
- Taine, Hippolyte. Les origines de la France contemporaine: L'ancien régime, La révolution, L'anarchie, la conquête jacobine. Collection Bouquins. Paris: Robert Lafont, 2011 (1875–1893). ISBN 978-2221122181.
- Thadden, Rudolf von. Restauration und napoleonisches Erbe: Der Verwaltungszentralismus als politisches Problem in Frankreich (1814–1830). Wiesbaden: Steiner, 1955, 1972. OCLC 729290.
- Thiers, Adolphe. Histoire de la révolution française. Paris: Lecointe & Durey, 1823–1827. Digital edition, Project Gutenberg
- Waresquiel, Emmanuel de, and Benoît Yvert. Histoire de la Restauration 1814-1830: Naissance de la France moderne. Collection Tempus. Paris: Perrin, 2002 (1996). ISBN 978-2262019013.
