= French Institute of Administrative Sciences =

French organization

The French Institute of Administrative Sciences was created in 1947 by René Cassin. The association was recognized of public utility and is a member of the International Institute of Administrative Sciences. Linked to the French Conseil d'Etat, the president of IFSA is traditionally the vice-president of the Conseil d'Etat.

== Description ==
The French Institute of Administrative Sciences aims at developing administrative law in France.

Since its creation in 1947, the Institute organized numerous conferences and participated to the works of the French doctrine in administrative law.

FIAS added two regional offices in 1969: one in Bordeaux and another in Nice.

The Institute has more than 300 members with different backgrounds: high civil servants (French State Councillors, Members of the Supreme financial court, Inspectors), university professors but also representatives of private companies.

The Institute is located in the French Council of State, place du Palais-Royal in Paris.

== Activities ==
The IFSA organizes each year two conferences:

- an actuality conference,
- an historical conference.

=== Actuality conferences ===
Here are examples of themes of actuality conferences:

- The theme of the 2009 actuality conference organized by the IFSA is "Public security: partnership between public power and private actors"
- Management delegations in the public service
- France-Télécom-la Poste : new public firms? A new public service?
- The administration of national education
- Administration and new tools to help decision-makers
- Expectations and demands of citizens towards the administration
- State and private firms

=== Historical conferences ===
IFSA in partnership with the French Practical School of High Studies organizes each year an historical conference on diverse themes :

- Administration and justice
- State and theater
- State and sport
- State and crime

== International activities ==
IFSA participates actively in the works of the International Institute of Administrative Sciences (IISA). A delegation of the IFSA participated for instance in the third international conference of the IISA in Beijing. IFSA also participated in the meeting in Quebec on “General states of public administration.”

In 1998, IFSA organized in Paris the 24th International Congress of administrative sciences on the theme : “citizen and administration.” The Congress took place in Paris in the UNESCO palace.

== Board of directors ==
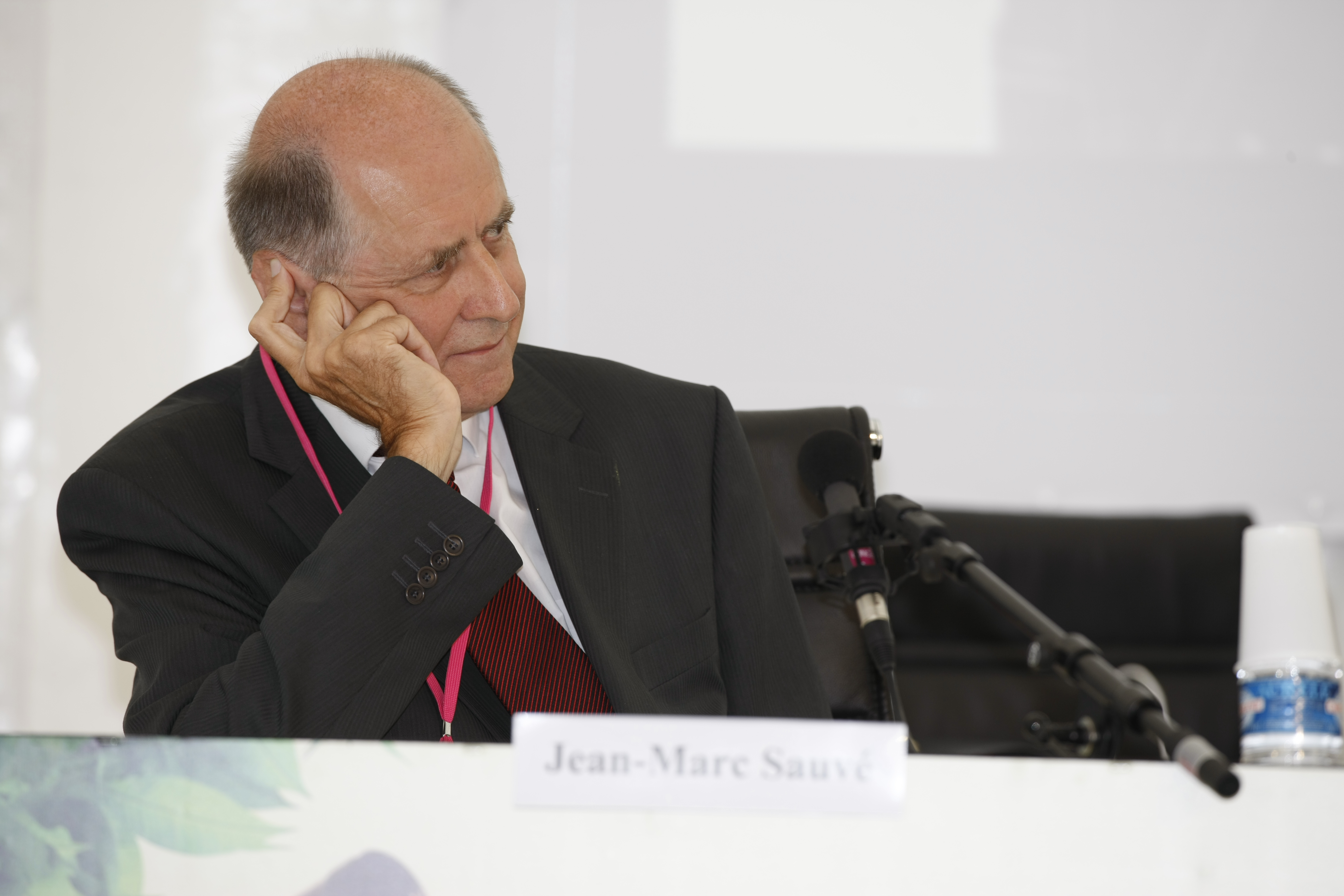
Jean-Marc Sauvé, president of IFSA.

- President : Jean-Marc Sauvé, vice-president of the French State Council
- Secretary general : Terry Olson, State councillor and delegate for foreign relations in the Council of State
- Treasury : Bruno Rémond, Councillor in the French Financial Supreme Court and teacher in the Paris Institute of political studies (Sciences Po Paris)

IFSA’s board of directors gathers regularly to give the Institute its main objectives..

== Regional sections ==
At regional scale, IFSA is divided in 8 sections:

- I.F.S.A Languedoc-Roussillon
- I.F.S.A Nord-Pas-de-Calais
- I.F.S.A Picardie
- I.F.S.A Centre-Poitou-Limousin
- I.F.S.A West Section
- I.F.S.A Rhône-Alpes
- I.F.S.A Est
- I.F.S.A Haute-Normandie

== International section ==
IFSA is the French section of the IISA: International Institute of Administrative Sciences based in Bruxelles.

== Links with the French State Council ==
IFSA’s president is traditionally the vice-president of the French Council of State.

== Famous members ==
- Renaud Denoix de Saint Marc, former president of IFSA, former vice-president of the French State Council, member of the French Constitutional Council
- Franck Moderne, famous French law teacher
- Jacqueline Morand-Deviller, famous law teacher in Sorbonne, author of Lessons of administrative law .
- Anicet Le Pors, former secretary of State
- Roland Drago, famous French law teacher

== Publications ==
- The administrative judge and Europe: Dialogue of judges, proceedings of the conference for the 50th anniversary of administrative tribunals by IFSA and Henri Oberdorff et Boleslaw Lukaszewicz, January 2004
- Renawal and land settlement, by IFSA and Jacques Fialaire, January 2002
- Public service and social link by IFSA and Severine Decreton, January 1999
- The administrative judge at the beginning of the 21st century: proceedings of the conference for the 40th anniversary of administrative tribunals, conference organized the 11th and 12 March 1994 by IFSA, Henri Oberdorff, Guy Gardavaud Book - January 1995
- International juridical cooperation: sixth national day of law by IFSA and the National Association of law studies (France, January 1994)
- The administration of national education by IFSA, January 1992
- Decision making in the national education by IFSA and Gerard Marcou, Claude Durand-Prinborgne, Jean-Paul Costa, January 1992
- Evolution of relationships between the administration and citizens by IFSA and Celine Wiener, January 1991
- Rationality, Efficiency, and Productivity: Concepts and Applicability in Public Administration of Developing Countries by l'UNESCO and IFSA, Sathaban Bandit Phatthanaborihansat, Juree Namsirichai Vichit-Vadakan, Francois Poulin, January 1989
- State’s budget by IFSA, January 1988

== See also ==
- Administrative law
