= Capture of Fort-Dauphin (1794) =

- Part of the Haitian Revolution and the War of the Pyrenees
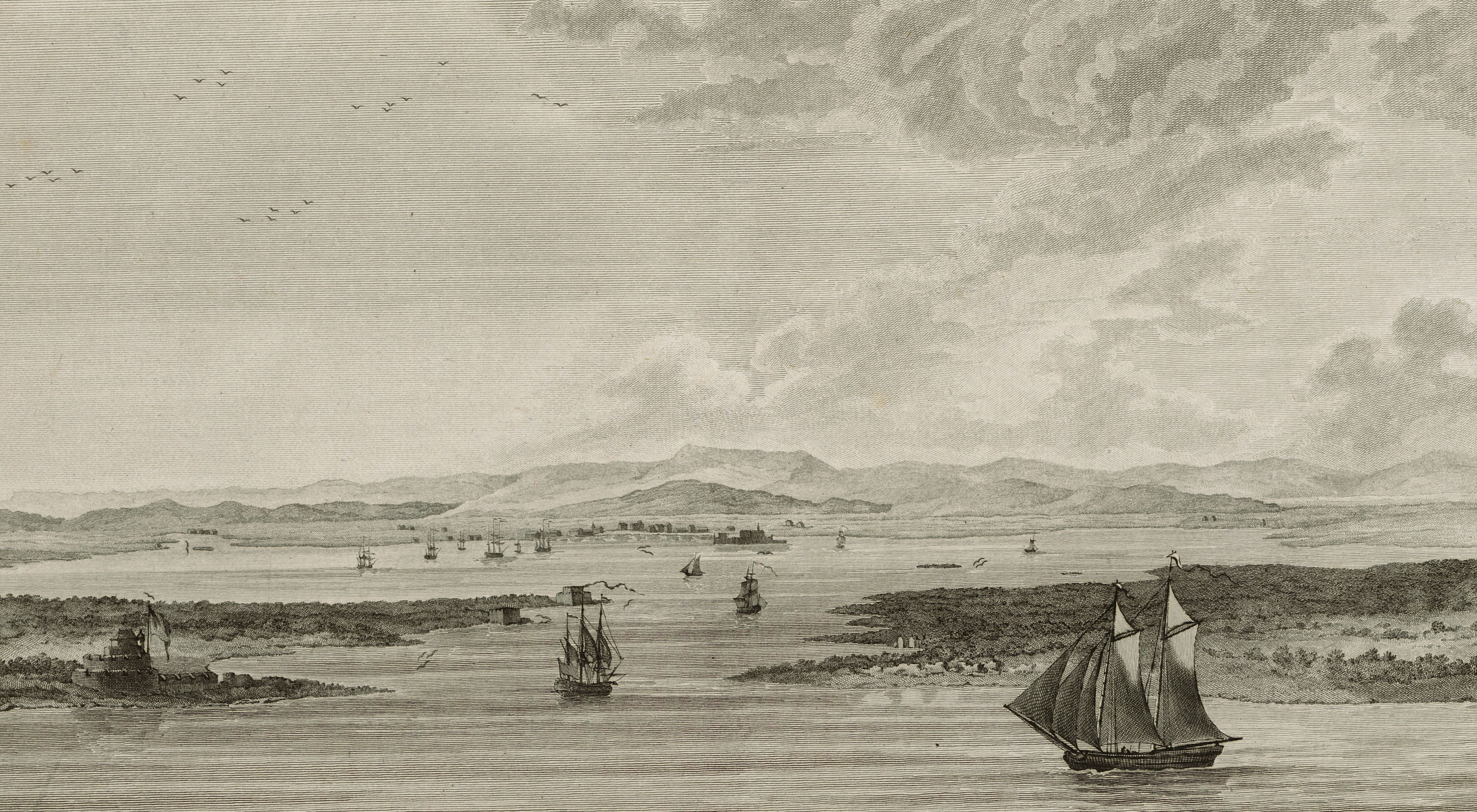
- View of the bay of Fort-Dauphin by Nicolas Ozanne, 1791
Date	28–29 January 1794
Location	Fort-Dauphin, Saint-Domingue 19°40′4″N 71°50′23″W
Result	Spanish victory

Belligerents
Spain	France

Commanders and leaders
Gabriel de Aristizábal	Candy

Strength
3 ships of the line 1 frigate 400 men	1,031 men

Casualties and losses
None	1,031 captured 41 guns captured
- Location within Haiti Capture of Fort-Dauphin (1794) (North America)

The capture of Fort-Dauphin was a bloodless encounter of the French Revolutionary Wars in which a Spanish expeditionary force under Admiral Gabriel de Aristizábal y Espinosa seized Fort-Dauphin (now Fort-Liberté), in Saint-Domingue, from France. The French garrison of about a thousand men, blockaded by land and sea, surrendered without firing a single shot.

== Capture ==
In late January 1794, a Spanish fleet of three ships of the line accompanied by a frigate landed 400 soldiers and blockaded Fort-Dauphin. On 28 January, the French Republican garrison, commanded by the mulatto Candy, surrendered to Admiral Aristizábal y Espinosa without firing a single shot. Candy, however, made it a condition for his capitulation that Jean-François Papillon's black troops not be allowed to enter the city.

The Spanish did not respect the terms of the capitulation. Candy was arrested and sent to Mexico to do hard labour, whereas the rest of prisoners were sent to France as prisoners of war. Fort-Dauphin was occupied by Spanish troops of the Puerto Rico Regiment under the command of Joaquim de Saso. The Spanish captured 41 cannons, having suffered no losses.
