= Fort-Liberté =

Fort-Liberté Fòlibète Bayaha • Fort-Dauphin • Fort Saint-Joseph • Fort Castries • Fort-Royal
- Commune
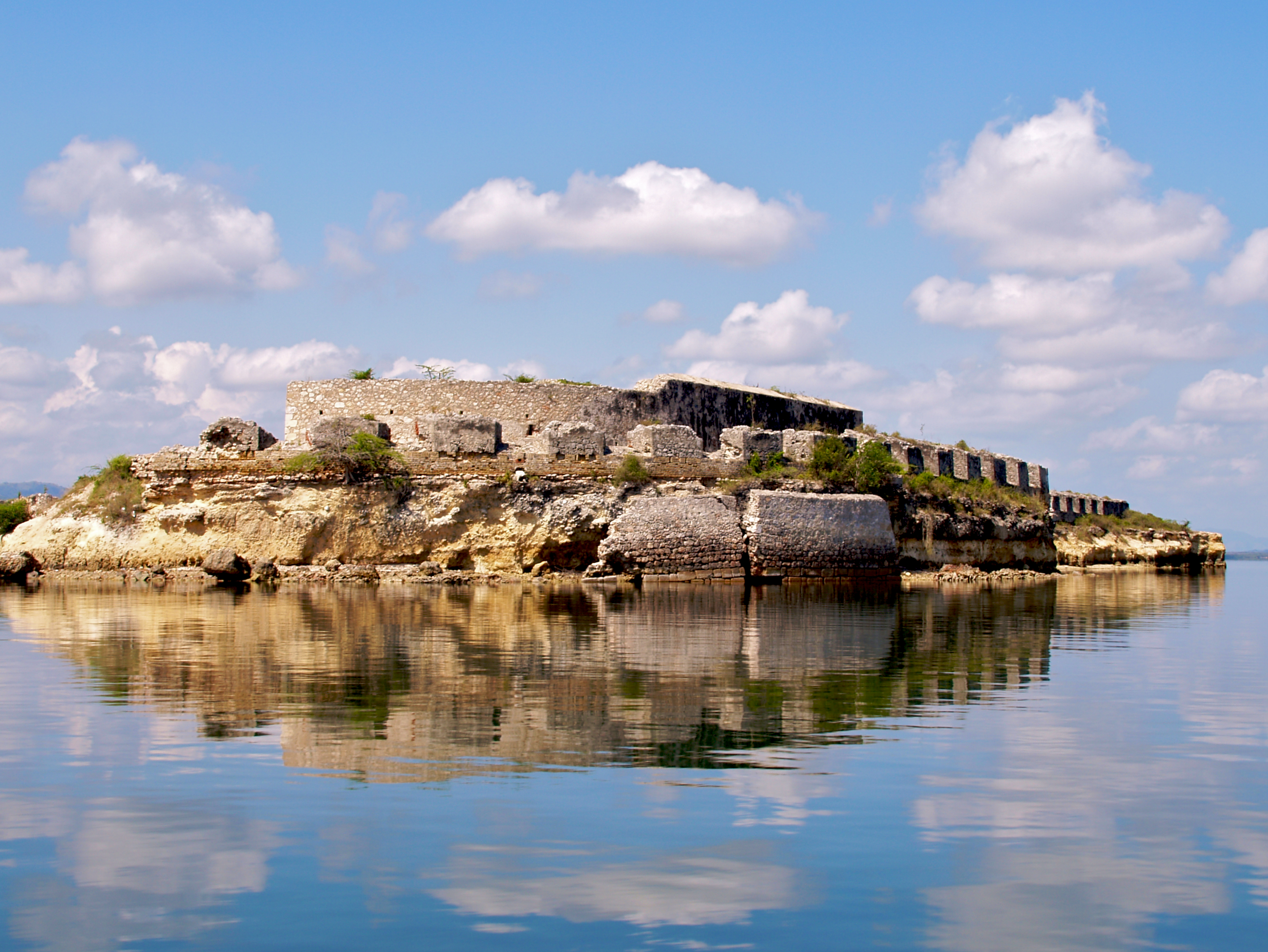
- A view from the north of Fort-Liberté

- Location in Haiti
- Coordinates: 19°40′4″N 71°50′23″W
- Country: Haiti
- Department: Nord-Est
- Arrondissement: Fort-Liberté

Area
  - Commune: 240.28 km^{2} (92.77 sq mi)
  - Urban: 3.39 km^{2} (1.31 sq mi)
  - Rural: 236.89 km^{2} (91.46 sq mi)
- Elevation: 0 m (0 ft)

Population (2015)
  - Commune: 34,434
  - Density: 143.31/km^{2} (371.17/sq mi)
  - Urban: 26,929
  - Rural: 7,505
- Time zone: UTC-05:00 (EST)
  - Summer (DST): UTC-04:00 (EDT)
- Towns: 3
- Communal Sections: 4

Fort-Liberté (French pronunciation: [fɔʁ libɛʁte]; Haitian Creole: Fòlibète) is a commune and the administrative capital of the Nord-Est department of Haiti. It is one of the oldest cities in the country. Haiti's independence was proclaimed there on November 29, 1803.

The area around Fort-Liberté was originally inhabited by Indigenous peoples of the Americas, and later by Spanish colonists, who founded the city of Bayaja in 1578, but abandoned it in 1605. The site was reoccupied by the French in 1732 as Fort-Dauphin; it was captured by Spanish forces in 1794, restored to the French in 1801 and then surrendered to the British on 8 September 1803, shortly before the declaration of independence. The city has undergone a succession of name changes: Bayaja (1578), Fort-Dauphin (1732), Fort St. Joseph (1804), Fort-Royal (1811) and finally Fort-Liberté (1820). The town is the see city of the Diocese of Fort-Liberté.

== Demographics ==
As of 2015, the population of the commune of Fort-Liberté was estimated to be 34,434, of which 22,416 resided in the town itself. The number of households in the commune was 4,822, with an average of 4.5 individuals per household. The adult population (18+) made up 58% of the commune, with 42% under the age of 18. Haitian Creole is spoken in this area, with the more educated people also speaking French. The most common religious affiliations are Catholic and Haitian Vodou.

== Geography ==
Fort-Liberté is part of the department of Nord-Est, which borders the Dominican Republic. Nord-Est has an area of 1,805 square kilometres (697 mi^{2}) and a population of 283,800 (2002). The arrondissement consists of the three communes of Fort-Liberté, Ferrier and Perches. In the colonial era, it was a major plantation area, and today it remains an important coffee-producing area. Its pine forests are heavily exploited for charcoal. In addition, several colonial-era forts, mostly in ruins, are situated here.

Fort-Liberté is a natural harbour of the Saint-Domingue. It is strategically located in the centre of the bay facing the Atlantic Ocean. It was used as a naval base by the French, with four forts that "guarded the bay like beads on a string." Two of the larger forts are Fort Lachatre and Fort Labourque. They were captured by Toussaint Louverture (May 20, 1743 – April 7, 1803), the leader of the Haitian Revolution, in 1793. He later proceeded to the north and conquered the Spanish.

The fort is 40 nautical miles (74 km) from Port-de-Paix (the capital of Nord-Ouest) and 290 kilometres (180 mi) from Port-au-Prince (the capital of Haiti). The average elevation of the town is about 1 metre (3.3 ft).

=== Fort-Liberté Bay ===
The coast line between Fort-Liberté Bay and Point Yaquezi is about 8 miles (13 km). It has a low sandy beach. It has reefs with mangrove forests, and two hills (spaced at 0.5 miles (0.80 km)) about 3.5 miles (5.6 km) to the west of the entrance to the bay. The hills are the markers for the entrance to the port. Land locked, Fort-Liberté Bay is spread over a length of5 miles (8.0 km) in the east–west direction and has a breadth of about of 1 mile (1.6 km). The shallow waters that extends to 1 mile (1.6 km) provides for adequate draft and safe anchorage conditions. The entrance to the fort is stated to be "about 1.25 miles (2.01 km) long with not less than 15 fathoms depth of water in the fairway but is narrow and tortuous, so that a sailing vessel entering requires the wind to be well to the northward of east, and its leaving must have a commanding land breeze." The coast line from the entrance to the bay extends to 6.5 miles (10.5 km) in an easterly direction extending to Manzanillo Bay. There is no wharf. The tides are high – spring rise is 5.75 feet (1.75 m) and neap is 3.5 feet (1.1 m). Vessels anchor at the port in 12 fathoms deep water with manoeuvring space of 600–1,200 yards (550–1,100 m) on the east and northeast direction of the Bayon Islet, which is in the midst of the bay. Another anchorage point with 9 fathoms depth is found to the east of the fort. The tidal current at the entrance is said to be low in the morning hours when it is the best time to enter the port.

=== Fresh water resource ===
Marion River empties into the bay about 1 mile (1.6 km) to the west of the Fort-Liberté and is the source of water supply to the town.

== Climate ==
The city has a pleasant climate with a cool ocean breeze and an average temperature of 86 °F (30 °C). Hispaniola island as a whole is subject to varying weather changes, which result in severe storms, such as hurricanes and sunshine.

== History ==
Between 1503 and 1505, Nicolás de Ovando, Spanish governor of Hispaniola, founded the town of Puerto Real ("Royal Port"), which today lies around the town of Caracol, to the west of Fort-Liberté. However, soon this town was abandoned and the people moved to the east and in 1578 a new town was founded with the Taíno name of the region, Bayajá. Caracol was thought to be near the location where Santa Maria, Columbus's flagship struck a reef and sank on Christmas Day in 1492. The shipwreck was salvaged for its wood to build settlements known as La Navidad, which was decimated by Taino Indians led by its chief Guanagarix after Columbus left the place. This was discovered by the American Archaeologist William Hodges while excavating at Puerto Real, a city founded at the same spot years later. Relics gathered from this site are displayed at museum Limbe. However, no trace of the site is visible at the location.

In 1606, the persons living in the old Spanish towns of Bayajá and Yaguana under the orders of the Spanish king, moved to the eastern part of the island, to a new town called Bayaguana, combining the two old names. This episode in Dominican history is now known as the devastations of Osorio. The Spaniards had founded the city of Bayaha, now known as Fort-Liberté, one of the several towns of Hispaniola. The location became the historic site of Fort-Liberté as it was built in 1731 under the orders of Louis XV, King of France. Successive changes happened in the naming of the town reflecting the shift of power from Spanish to French colonization. The town was witness to the Haiti's first declaration of independence on November 29, 1803.

== Fort ==
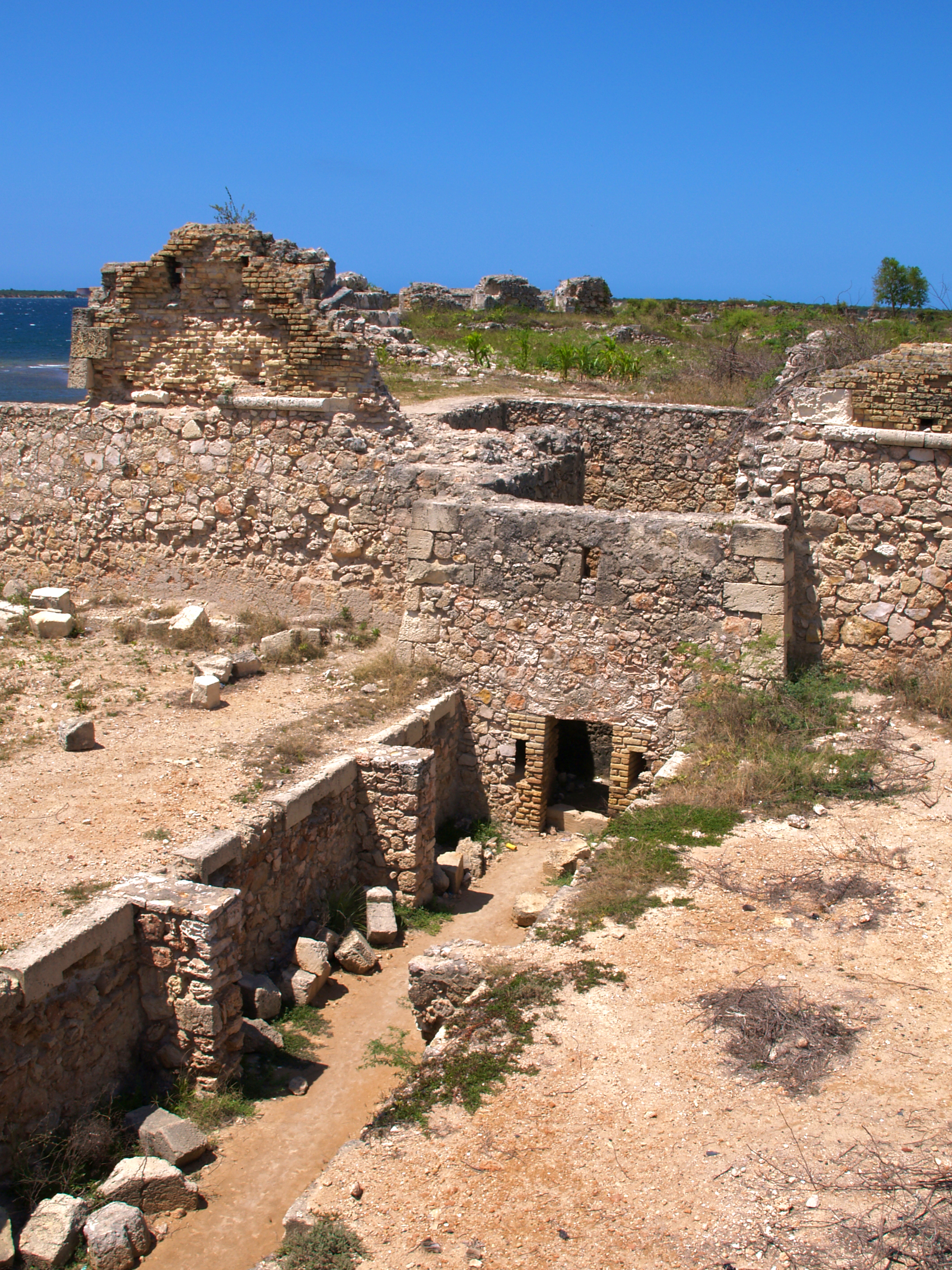
The fort at the edge of the city overlooking the bay

The fort, as such, within the city limits was constructed in 1731 at the port near the land end facing the bay, built under the directive of Louis XV, King of France, in order to defend against invasions. Fort-Liberté is on the southern shore of the bay. It is about 0.5 miles (0.80 km) north from the city centre. The shoal in front of the fort is steep and extends to about 20 yards (18 m). Now, only the fort ruins are seen as evidence of the ingenious design of the architects who selected the most strategic point on the island to build it overlooking the turquoise blue ocean waters. However, efforts have been made during the middle of the 1990s to restore the fort and the structures within it. Pilferage has seen the loss of the cannons and the cannonballs, apart from removal of stones imported from Nantes, France for pecuniary benefits without realising the gravity of the vandalism act. An issue of concern is the appearance of fissures in the fort walls, which are endangering the protection of forts from rains.

The fort has a colonial cathedral, which is now the renovated entrance to the city. It is called the "Belle Entrée (Beautiful Gate). In the vicinity, other forts are the Fort la Bouque, the Batterie de l'Anse, the Fort Saint Charles and the Fort Saint Frédérique. Bayau Island is also another important place.

The Ministry of Tourism, the Ministry of Culture, the Haitian representatives and the Royal Caribbean officials have launched a project to encourage tourism to Fort-Liberté and its fort and Port-au-Prince by building facilities of hotels and other infrastructure.

== Economy ==
The bay was the site of Caribbean's largest sisal plantation until nylon was invented. From the time of colonization, the economy of the island has been essentially agriculture centric. Plantation tillage has been the main occupation, inclucing sugar-cane, coffee, sisal, cocoa, and cotton. In 1789, the French part of the island had 793 sugar plantations, 3,117 coffee plantations, 789 cotton plantations, and 182 establishments for making rum, plus other minor factories and workshops. In 1791, investments were largely oriented towards these cultivations. Trade and economy of the city and its precincts, at present are – coffee, cacao, honey, logwood, pineapple, and sisal, which are the principal products.

== Communal Sections ==
The commune consists of four communal sections, namely:

- Dumas, urban and rural, containing the city of Fort-Liberté
- Bayaha, rural
- Loiseau, urban and rural, containing the town of Dérac
- Haut Madeleine, urban and rural, containing the Quartier de l'Acul Samedi
