= Jacques Fournier (government official) =

French government official (1929–2021)

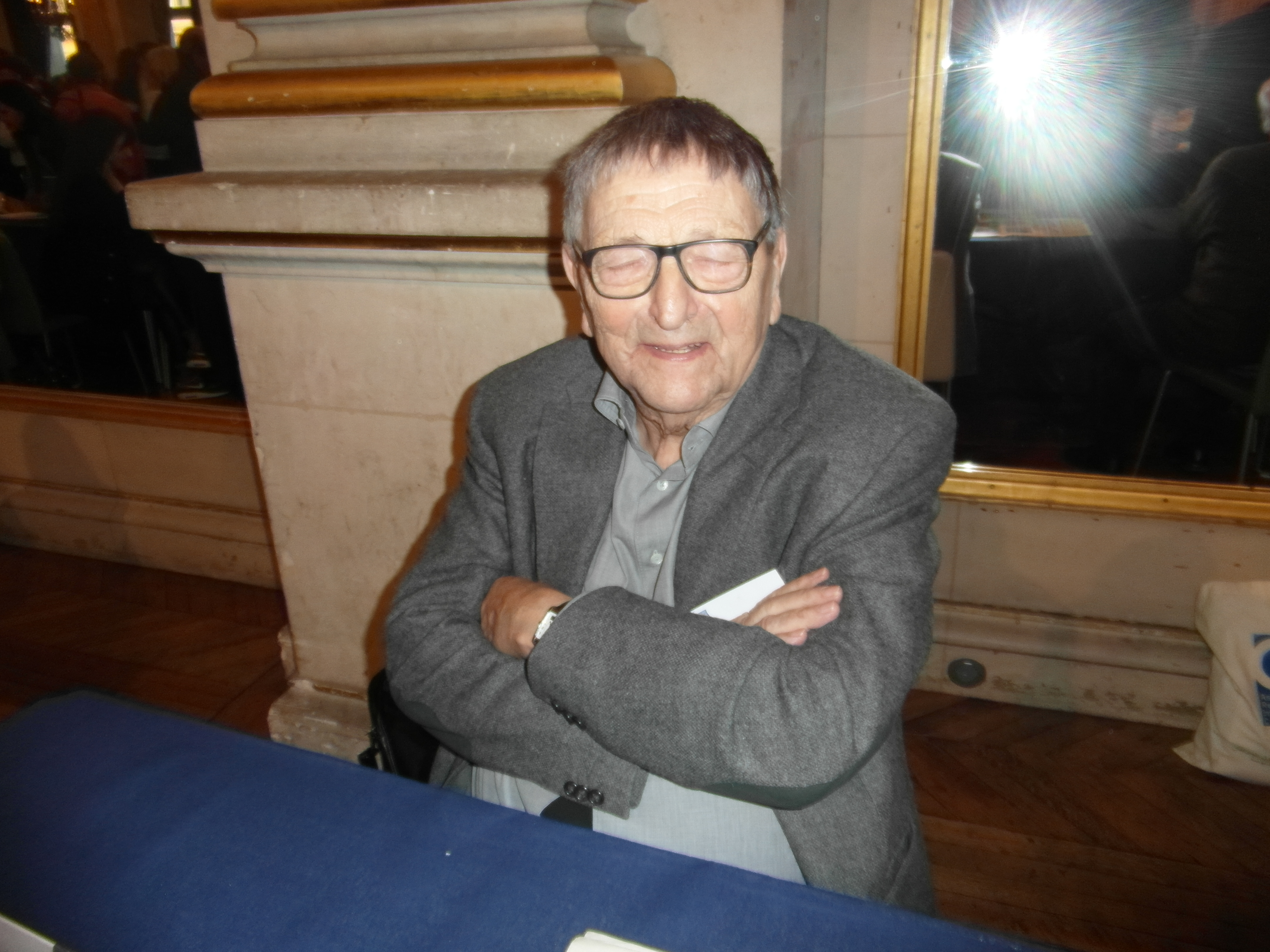
- Fournier in 2015

Secrétaire général du Gouvernement
- In office 10 July 1982 – 26 March 1986
- Preceded by: Marceau Long
- Succeeded by: Renaud Denoix de Saint Marc

Personal details
- Born: 5 May 1929 Épinal, France
- Died: 14 August 2021 (aged 92)
- Party: PS

Jacques Fournier (5 May 1929 – 14 August 2021) was a French government official.

== Biography ==
Fournier spent his childhood and studies in French Algeria. He was a student at the École nationale d'administration from 1951 to 1953 and subsequently served as a legal advisor at the French Embassy in Morocco from 1961 to 1964. He then served as a Conseiller d'État and was on Plan Commission. He served as Deputy Secretary General of the Presidency of the French Republic, then Secrétaire général du Gouvernement from 1982 to 1986 before being relieved of his duties by Renaud Denoix de Saint Marc. He then served as President of Gaz de France from 1986 to 1988. He subsequently served as President of SNCF from 24 August 1988 to 1 March 1993.

A political activist, Fournier became a member of the Socialist Party following the Epinay Congress and joined the Centre d'études, de recherches et d'éducation socialiste.

Jacques Fournier died on 14 August 2021 at the age of 92.

== Publications ==
- Politique de l'éducation (1972)
- Traité du social (1976)
- Le Pouvoir du social (1979)
- Le Travail gouvernemental (1987)
- Le Train, l’Europe et le service public (1993)
- Critique de la raison communautaire (1996)
- Livre blanc sur le dialogue social dans la fonction publique (2002)
- Itinéraire d’un fonctionnaire engagé (2008)
- L'Économie des besoins (2013)
