= Conseil d'État =

French administrative justice institution and legal counsel to the government

Coordinates: 48°51′48″N 2°20′13″E

Council of State
- Conseil d'État
- Council logo
- Predecessor: Conseil du Roi
- Formation: 1799; 227 years ago
- Founder: Le Consulat
- Type: Advisory body; Administrative court
- Purpose: Appeals court
- Headquarters: Palais-Royal
- Location: Paris, France
- Members: c. 300
- Website: www.conseil-etat.fr

In France, the Conseil d'État ([kɔ̃sɛj deta]; Council of State) is a governmental body that acts both as legal adviser to the executive branch and as the supreme administrative court (one of the two branches of the French judiciary system). Established in 1799 by Napoleon as a successor to the King's Council (Conseil du Roi), it is located in the Palais-Royal in Paris and is primarily made up of top-level legal officers. The Vice President of the Council of State ranks as the most important civil servant in France.

Members of the Council of State are part of a Grand Corps of the French State (Grand corps de l'État). The Council of State mainly recruits from among the top-ranking students graduating from the École nationale d'administration, which has been renamed as the Institut national du service public.

== Composition ==
A General Session of the Council of State is presided over by the Prime Minister or, in their absence, the Minister of Justice. However, since the real presidency of the Council is held by the Vice-President, the Vice President of the Council of State usually presides at all but the most ceremonial assemblies. This is also done for obvious reasons pertaining to the separation of powers.

Other members of the Council include, in decreasing order of importance:

- Department heads (Présidents de section)
- Councillors ordinary (Conseillers d'État ordinaires)
- Councillors extraordinary (Conseillers d'État en service extraordinaire)
- Masters of Requests (Maîtres des requêtes)
- Master of requests extraordinary (Maîtres des requêtes en service extraordinaire)
- Senior masters (Auditeurs de première classe)
- Masters (Auditeurs de deuxième classe)

The Vice-President of Council of State is appointed by Order-in-Council on the recommendation of the Minister of Justice and is selected from among the Council's department heads or councillors ordinary. Division heads are similarly appointed and selected from among the councillors ordinary.

Councillors ordinary, masters of requests, and senior masters are appointed based on seniority from the preceding rank. Appointees from outside the Council may include administrative law judges or may come from outside the justice system. Masters are recruited from among the graduates of France's National Administration Academy. The Council sits in the Palais Royal located in Paris.

The Council is divided into 7 divisions:

- Administrative Claims (section du contentieux) — see below.
- Report and Studies (section du rapport et des études): writes the annual report, conducts studies and helps to oversee judgments and verdicts are carried out.
- Finances (section des finances), the Interior (section de l'intérieur), Welfare and Social Security (section sociale), Public Works (section des travaux publics) and Administrative Issues (section de l'administration, created by a March 2008 order) review any and all Cabinet-issued orders and statutory instruments and examine and sign off on all Orders of Council (décrets en Conseil d'État). These reviews, though mandatory, are not binding. The Council of State also studies legal issues and problems brought before the Cabinet. In addition, it is responsible for carrying out administrative court inspections.

== History ==
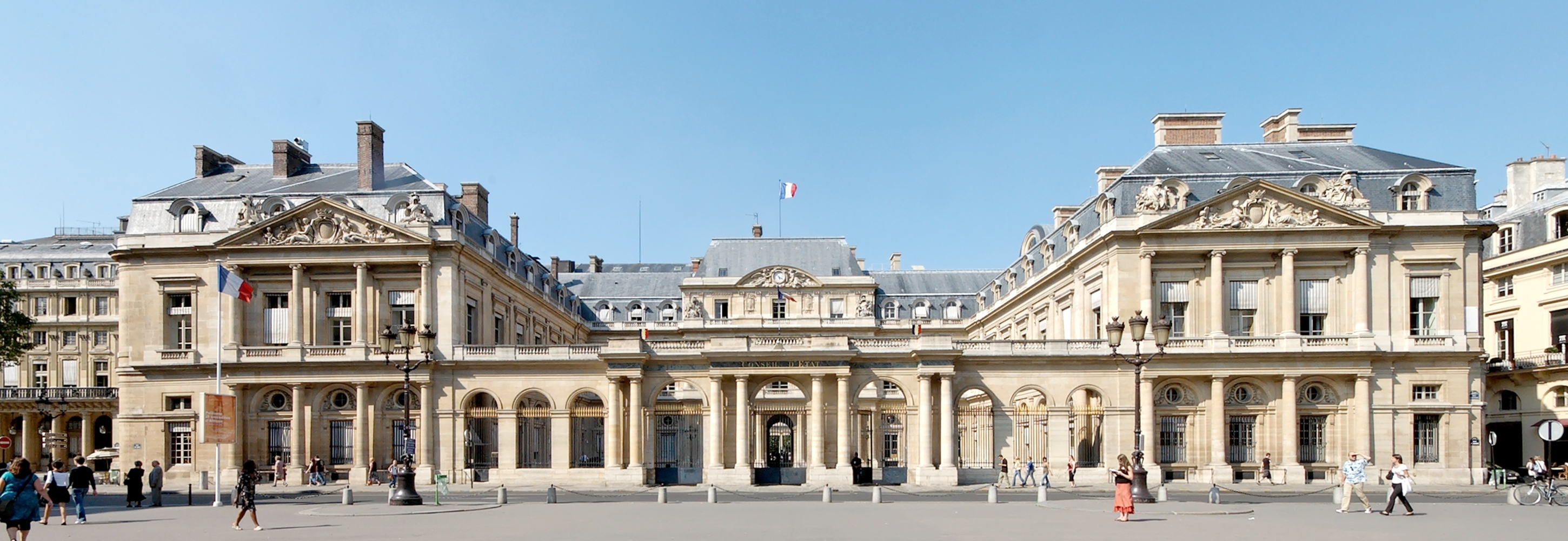
The Palais-Royal in Paris, home of the Conseil d'État

The Council of State originates from the 13th century, by which time the King's Court (Curia regis) had split into three sections, one of which was the King's Council (Curia in consilium, later Conseil du roi), which too broke up into three distinct parts: the Conseil secret 'Privy Council', the Conseil privé 'Private Council', and Conseil des finances 'Council of Finances'. Reorganized under Louis XIV into two major groupings, the Conseil d'État privé, finances et direction was the direct ancestor of the Council of State. It brought together legal advisors and experts to advise the King on claims against the Crown. Officially established in 1557, this was the largest of the King's Councils made up of France's High Chancellor, lords of peerage, Ministers and Secretaries of State, the Comptroller-General, 30 Councillors of State, 80 masters of requests, and the Intendants of Finance. The judicial portion of the Council was known as the Conseil d'État privé or Conseil des parties.

French kings had the power to dispense justice and hand down judgments as the court of last resort and delegated this judicial power to royal courts and parlements. But the French king still retained the power to override them at will. Specifically, French kings maintained their privilege to decide major issues and hand down judgment when administrative acts were in dispute. The judgments of the King's Council of State were regarded as being issued under the King's residual proper jurisdiction (justice retenue), that is, the sovereign's reserved power to dispense justice in certain matters. Legal advisors also assisted the King in developing new laws and, by delegated jurisdiction, directly exercised sovereign rights (jura regalia).

For more on French government administration during the Old Regime, see Ancien Régime in France.

The French Consulate government established the current Council of State in 1799 as a judicial body to adjudicate claims against the State and assist in the drafting of important laws. The First Consul (later Emperor) presided over Council sessions, and the Council performed many of the functions of a Cabinet. After the Bourbon Restoration, the Council was retained as an administrative court but without its former prominence. Its role was more precisely defined by an 1872 Act of Parliament.

The Council of State was originally a court of first instance and last instance, but since the creation of the tribunaux administratifs in 1953 and the cours administratives d’appel in 1987, it has increasingly become a supervisory court, with a role as an appeal court in a small number of areas. The Council of State hears appeals on questions of law from lower courts and gives advisory opinions on the law on reference from lower courts. Below it are 42 administrative courts of first instance (tribunaux administratifs) and 8 administrative courts of appeal (cours administratives d'appel).

== Advisory role ==
Certain types of statutory instruments must be examined by the Council and receive its advisory approval, including:

- All draft legislation proposed by non-parliamentary members and prior to being introduced before Parliament.
- Orders-in-council, signed by the Prime Minister and cabinet ministers; any such order is a form of delegated legislation outlining how a statute or act of Parliament is to be carried out or put into effect. Typically, a statutory law will authorize, prescribe, or prohibit an action defined in broad terms and require a government order to define its scope and application.

The Council's advisory workload is divided between its administrative sections with respect to the ministry or department affected by the government order.

== Administrative justice ==
The Council acts as the supreme court of appeal for administrative law courts. It hears both claims against national-level administrative decisions (notably orders, rules, regulations and decisions of the executive branch) and appeals from lower administrative courts. The Council's decisions are final and unappealable.

While strictly speaking the Council of State is not a court, it functions as a judicial body by adjudicating suits and claims against administrative authorities. Plaintiffs are represented by barristers drawn from the Senior Court bar whose members are licensed to argue cases before the Council and Court of Cassation; any such barrister bears the title of Counsel at Senior Court (Avocat aux Conseils).

=== Original jurisdiction ===
The Council hears cases against decisions of the national government, notably government orders, ministerial rules and regulations, judgments handed down by committees, commissions, and boards with nationwide jurisdiction, as well as suits concerning regional and EU electoral matters.

The Council has judged that such acts are restricted to:

- relationships between the executive branch and the legislative branch, e.g., whether a bill should be submitted to Parliament;
- acts that are part and parcel of France's foreign policy.

In this role, the Council provides a powerful check on the actions of the executive.

=== Appellate jurisdiction ===
The Council of State has appellate jurisdiction over local election judgments from any of the 37 administrative courts.

It acts as a final court of cassation for decisions originating from any of the eight appellate administrative courts, meaning that it hears cases in which the plaintiff argues that the appellate court ignored or misinterpreted the law. Should it decide that the original appellate court took the wrong decision, the Council of State will in most situations transfer the case to a different administrative court of appeal, to be re-judged. However, in the interest of swifter decision-making and correct interpretation of the law (bonne administration de la justice), it also has the right to rule on the case without transferring it, thus acting as an appellate court of last resort (jugement en dernier ressort).

=== Court procedure ===
Like nearly all French courts, the Council's court system is inquisitorial, and proceedings are initiated by a statement of claim detailing the factual background of the case and why the appellant should be granted relief. The Council then begins a formal investigation, asking the appellee, i.e., the government or a government agency or office, to satisfy the Council with a detailed statement of defense. Burden of proof does not lie with the plaintiff; instead, the Council decides whether or not the appellant has cause to bring suit and whether the government was in error if information provided by the appellant is sufficient to locate previously undisclosed evidence. Of course, both parties may submit additional pleadings and information until the case is ready for final judgment.

The formation of judgement depends on the importance of the case, for the jurisprudence and the interest of the law. All of the formations belong to the Administrative Claims department.

The smaller cases (without new legal issues) are treated by one chamber (known as under-departments, i.e. sous-section, prior to their reorganization in 2016). There are 10 chambers. The bigger cases are attributed to united chambers (chambres réunies), a configuration made up of two chambers, although, for some important fiscal cases, three or four chambers can be concerned, coalescing into an ad hoc formation, the "full fiscal" (plénière fiscale) chamber. The more important cases are for the administrative claims department judgement formation (Section). Only the very important cases, with hard, new and/or important legal issues are concerned. There are about between 20 and 40 cases per year into this specific formation, which includes the president of the ten chambers, the three assistant-presidents of the administrative claims department and the president of the department, which, in addition to the magistrate responsible of the investigation about the case, reaches 15 members.

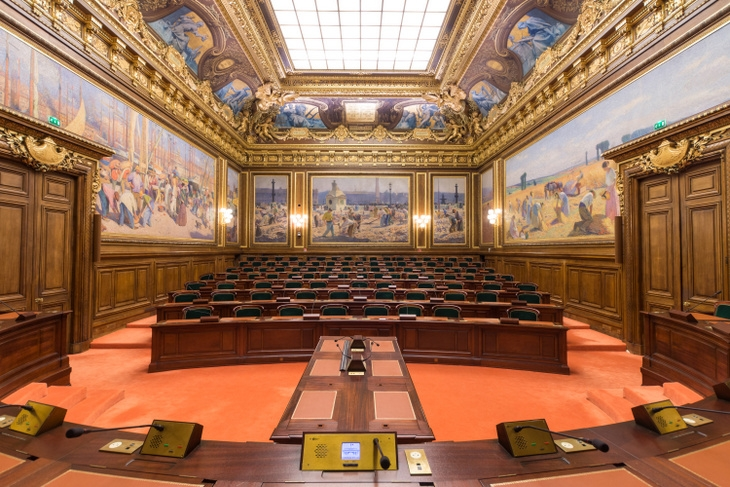
General Assembly Room (Salle de l'assemblée générale), where the members of the Council gather to resolve the major cases

The major cases are resolved by the administrative claims assembly (Assemblée du contentieux). All the presidents of departments are there, under the presidency of the Vice-President of the Council of State. Less than 10 cases per year are concerned.

All the cases, even the ones eventually resolved by the Assemblée du contentieux, are first studied by a chamber.

Although, as is the general rule in French administrative law, the procedure is written, one of its highlights are the oral conclusion of the rapporteur public (public magistrate), giving his personal vision of the case, totally impartial and free, on a pure legal point of view. Reading the conclusions from past cases is often useful to understand the mindset of the judges and the reason of the solution given to the case. Nonetheless, and unlike in common law jurisdictions operating under stare decisis, those former judgements do not constitute a binding precedent for French judges, who remain free to adapt or overturn them (in a so-called renversement de jurisprudence).

Since an order of 2009 (n° 2009–14, 7 January 2009), there is a possibility for the parties to speak after the rapporteur public's conclusions. Lawyers use this possibility only for major cases, when it can make a significant difference (e.g. for the Hoffmann-Gleman case – 16 February 2009 – concerning the compensation of the daughter of a deported Jew during the World War II, involving the French state's responsibility).

In some cases, there may be some confusion as to whether a case should be heard before an administrative law court or judicial court, in which case the Court of Jurisdictional Disputes, or tribunal des conflits, made up of an even number of State councillors and Supreme Judicial Court justices, is convened to decide to whom the matter shall be vested. Until 2015, this Court was chaired by the Minister of Justice, whose vote would break any potential tie. As of 2015, court members elect a president amongst themselves for 3 years, and, in case of a tie, the court's composition can be modified to include several more judges.

=== Major rulings of the Council of State ===
Exercising judicial review over almost all acts of the executive branch, the Council of State's judgments may be of considerable importance, often not for the actual case judged, but for their importance in shaping legal interpretation. While France is a civil law country and there is no formal rule of precedent (stare decisis), lower courts follow the jurisprudence constante doctrine with regard to the Council of State. The Council's major rulings are collected into law reports and commented on by scholars; the Council's official website carries a list of comments on important decisions. The Council has shaped its own legal doctrine which consists mostly of principles deduced from cases but incorporates considerable jurisprudence derived from statutes.

Rulings are named for the moving parties (appellants) in the cases and under highly formal courtesy titles. Men's names used to be preceded by Sieur, women's names by Dame or Demoiselle, and widows were referred to as Dame veuve.

About 10,000 rulings per year are given by the Council of State.

The most important rulings are collected in a publication called "G.A.J.A" (i.e. Les Grands Arrêts de la Jurisprudence Administrative – The major rulings of the administrative jurisprudence -), published by Dalloz editions and written by some of the most influential authors or judges of the time in France (e.g. Bruno Genevois or Prosper Weil). The GAJA explains about 120 rulings, from 1873 to now, and quotes several hundreds of other important rulings.

Important rulings include:

- February 19, 1875 – Prince Napoléon
  The fact that a decision has been taken with political considerations does not make it an "act of government" that cannot be adjudicated by the Council (rescinding a previous doctrine). A prince had been removed from the Army for political reasons. The Council stated that his case had to be heard, but then decided that it was unfounded because the law said that his commission could be revoked.
- May 28, 1954 – Barel. Freedom of opinion of civil servants.
  After a number of Communists had been refused admission to the École nationale d'administration it was decided that the Government cannot exclude people from applying for civil service positions solely on the basis of their political convictions.
- October 19, 1962 – Canal, Robin & Godot
  The executive branch may make decisions by ordinance only within a narrowly defined scope authorised by the enabling law. The executive cannot mandate the creation of courts whose procedures and lack of recourse fall outside the general principles of criminal law.
  This decision was the source of tensions between the Council and then President Charles De Gaulle.
- February 3, 1989 – Alitalia corporation
  The executive branch is responsible for voiding its own unlawful rules and regulations, even if they were initially lawful. Regulatory law must comply with European Union directives in force.
- October 27, 1995 – Commune of Morsang-sur-Orge, also known commonly as the "dwarf tossing case".
  Respect for human dignity is to be included as part of the ordre public (the principles governing the public realm in France). In this case a mayor had prohibited a dwarf-tossing event on the grounds was against the "public interest" because it did not respect human dignity. This decision stops short of including morality as part of the ordre public.
- October 30, 1998 - Sarran, Levacher et autres
  The French Constitution prevails on international treaties, including European treaties. The Constitution is the supreme norm, above all other law rules.
- March 3, 2004 – The asbestos case.
  The State may be held responsible for not taking appropriate measures, in accordance with current scientific knowledge, to safeguard workers' health (against asbestos), even if workers are employed by private employers.
- October 3, 2008 - Commune d'Annecy
  As the Charter for the Environment is cited in the preamble of the French Constitution, all the rights and duties it defines have constitutional value.

== French Institute of Administrative Sciences ==
The Council of State is linked to the French Institute of Administrative Sciences (IFSA). The vice-president of the Council of State is the president of the IFSA and its main members are state counselors. In 2009, the Council of State hosted IFSA's annual conference which was organized on the theme: "public security: partnership between public power and private sector."

== See also ==
- Court of Audit
- Councillor of State
- Constitutional Council
- French Institute of Administrative Sciences (IFSA)
- French Supreme Court
- Justice in France
- Politics of France
- Ordonnance
- Court of Appeal (France)
- General principles of French law
- Vincent-Victor Henri Viénot de Vaublanc
- Administrative jurisdiction in France
