= Renaud Denoix de Saint Marc =

French lawyer

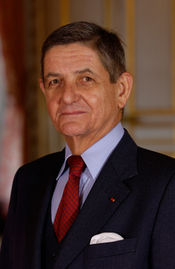

Member of the Constitutional Council
- In office 5 March 2007 – 4 March 2016
- Appointed by: Christian Poncelet
- President: Jean-Louis Debré
- Preceded by: Simone Veil
- Succeeded by: Michel Pinault

Vice President of the Council of State
- In office 23 April 1995 – 3 October 2006
- Preceded by: Marceau Long
- Succeeded by: Jean-Marc Sauvé

Personal details
- Born: 24 September 1938 (age 88) Boulogne-Billancourt, France
- Education: Sciences Po, ÉNA
- Occupation: Lawyer

Renaud Denoix de Saint Marc (born 24 September 1938 in Boulogne-Billancourt, Hauts-de-Seine) is a French lawyer.

== Life ==
From 23 April 1995 Renaud Denoix de Saint Marc served as head (vice-president) of the French Council of State as vice-president up to his retirement on 25 September 2006. He was elected on 29 November 2004, into the French Academy of Moral and Political Sciences, in the general section. On 22 February 2007, he was appointed member of the Constitutional Council of France by president of the Senate Christian Poncelet. In 2009 he was elected to the Académie Nationale de Médecine.

=== Education ===
He was educated at Sciences Po then at the École nationale d'administration. He entered the Council of State in 1964.

== See also ==
- Law of France

Legal offices
Preceded by Marceau Long	Vice President of the Council of State; 1995–2006	Succeeded by Jean-Marc Sauvé
Preceded by Simone Veil	Member of the Constitutional Council; 2007–2016	Succeeded by Michel Pinault
