= Fort la Bouque =

Colonial fort in Fort-Liberté, Haiti

Coordinates: 19°42′41.50″N 71°50′39.44″W

Fort la Bouque (French: [fɔʁ la buk]), commonly referred to by locals as Fort Labouc and formerly Fort Saint-Louis, is one of three colonial forts in the Fort-Liberté Arrondissement in the Nord-Est Department of Haiti. There are three other forts on the eastern edge of its channel: Batterie de l'Anse, Fort Saint-Charles and Fort Saint-Frédéric, the latter of which is known locally as Fort Lachatre. La Bouque sits northeasterly at the narrow tip separating the Atlantic Ocean and the Bay of Fort-Liberté and adjacent to a vast area of land northwesterly. The area occupied by La Bouque and the land adjacent known as ESSO by locals form part of the larger makeup of the bay.
