= Administrative jurisdiction in France =

System of administrative courts in France

The administrative jurisdiction in France is the branch of the judiciary responsible for judicial review, adjudicating and overseeing the French public administration of the state, territorial collectivities, and social security administrations, as well as resolving disputes involving them. In France, such disputes are handled by specialized judges: administrative judges.

This administrative jurisdiction generally evolved from the administration itself, which prior to 1872 judged its own disputes.

Administrative courts are fully independent tribunals, separate from judicial tribunals. They form one of the two jurisdictional orders in France, the other being the judicial order.

Proceedings are primarily written: lawyers rarely plead orally, except in certain disputes, such as those involving immigration law.

== Status ==
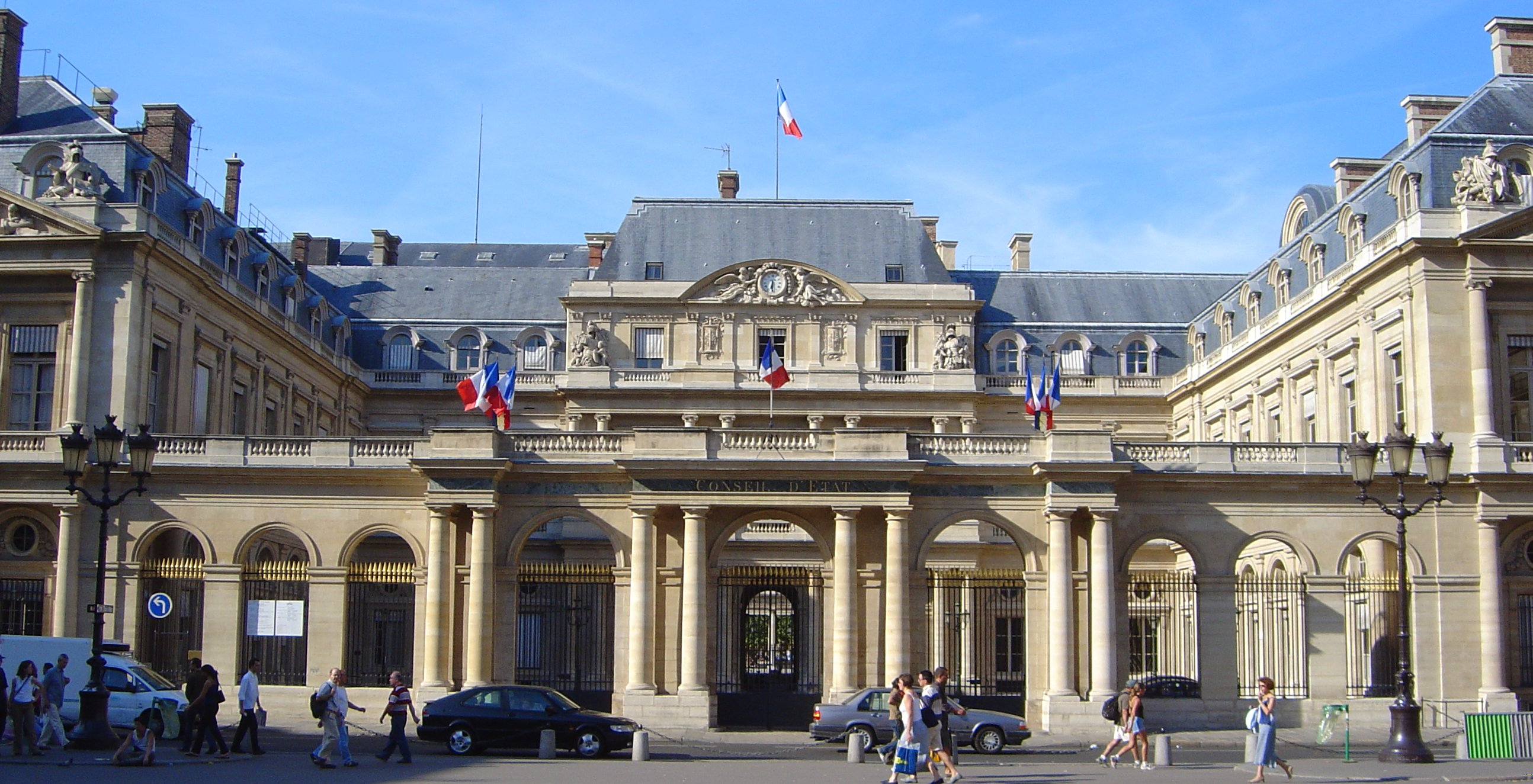
The Council of State is the highest court in the administrative jurisdiction.

The administrative jurisdiction was not explicitly recognized in the body of the 1958 Constitution until the 2008 constitutional reform and the introduction of the priority question of constitutionality. Previously, the Council of State was mentioned only as a consultative body, not as a judicial one.

In its decision of 22 July 1980 on the Validation Law, the Constitutional Council recognized that the independence of the administrative jurisdiction, as established by the law of 24 May 1872, is one of the fundamental principles recognized by the laws of the Republic (PFRLR)—granting it constitutional value (similar to the judicial order under Article 64 of the Constitution).

Furthermore, part of its jurisdiction, and incidentally its existence, was also constitutionalized—again as a PFRLR—by the Constitutional Council's decision of 23 January 1987 on the Competition Council, regarding the annulment and reform of decisions taken by administrative authorities in their exercise of public authority. To this end, the Constitutional Council relied on the "French conception of the separation of powers," characterized by Articles 10 to 13 of the laws of 16 and 24 August 1790, which prohibit judicial tribunals from interfering in state affairs under penalty of forfeiture, and by the decree of 16 Fructidor Year III, which bars these jurisdictions from hearing administrative acts of any kind.

== Types of appeals and powers of the administrative judge ==
In French administrative litigation, there are four main types of appeals, distinguished by the powers available to the judge.

=== Appeal for abuse of power ===
The appeal for abuse of power is the historic remedy in French administrative litigation. It is based on the principle of cassation through the annulment of an act violating a rule of law. The judge's powers are minimal. The grounds for an appeal for abuse of power are thus limited to questions of legality. There are two categories of grounds: internal legality grounds and external legality grounds. External legality grounds include the incompetence of the act's author, formal defects, and procedural defects. Internal legality grounds include errors of law, errors of fact, and violations of the law. The parties' main claims can only seek the annulment of the act or the dismissal of the application. Consequently, the judge's powers are limited. Initially, the judge could only grant annulment or dismissal claims. The judge may also order the losing party to pay costs not included in the taxable costs.

In principle, the annulment of an act results in its disappearance and the retroactive elimination of all effects it produced. The retroactivity of annulment is central to the principle of legality in administrative law. After annulment, the act is deemed never to have existed legally. This distinguishes annulment from abrogation, which eliminates the act only prospectively.

However, the powers of the judge in abuse of power appeals have expanded under the influence of the Council of State. First, the administrative judge can modulate the temporal effects of annulment since the Council of State's plenary decision of 11 May 2004, Association AC! and Others. In the name of protecting legal certainty, when the retroactive annulment of an illegal act's effects could have excessively severe consequences, the judge may modulate the timing of those effects or even deem past effects definitive. Second, the administrative judge has extended its power of injunction beyond the investigative phase (e.g., ordering document production). Since the law of 8 February 1995, it can issue injunctions to ensure enforcement of res judicata. These injunctions may include penalties. They do not dictate the decision the administration must take but require it to make a decision to comply with the judgment. Thus, the greater the administration's discretionary power, the less directive the injunction can be. Conversely, if the administration is in a bound competence situation, the injunction can specify the required decision.

=== Objective full litigation appeal ===
The objective full litigation appeal is also a challenge to the legality of an administrative act. Like the appeal for abuse of power, the grounds invoked concern the internal and external legality of the administrative act.

However, the application's claims may seek the reform of the act, i.e., its rewriting by the judge. In the case of an illegal sanction, the judge may substitute a legal sanction.

=== Subjective full litigation appeal ===
The subjective full litigation appeal does not concern the legality of an administrative act. It is an appeal challenging the liability of a public entity to obtain compensation for harm.

Administrative non-contractual liability is recognized as distinct from civil liability and falls under the administrative judge's jurisdiction since the Tribunal des Conflits' decision of 8 February 1873, Blanco. This decision recognizes the state's non-contractual liability in the performance of a public service mission. This liability is fault-based and requires the triad of fault, damage, and causation. Alongside the fault-based non-contractual liability regime, there is a no-fault non-contractual liability regime that includes only two of the three elements: damage and causation. The administration committed no fault, but the damage arises from its action. Compensation is awarded based on the principle of equality before public burdens, derived from Article 17 of the Declaration of the Rights of Man and of the Citizen of 1789. There is also a third type of non-contractual liability: liability without act, notably in the name of national solidarity. A typical example is the state's liability for gatherings under Article L. 211-10 of the Internal Security Code.

Administrative contractual liability applies exclusively within contractual relationships between the administration and its co-contractor (and third parties for regulatory clauses in the contract, e.g., internal regulations of a public service in a public service concession contract), unlike non-contractual liability, which anyone can invoke if conditions are met.

To bring a liability action against a public entity, the litigation must be linked. This is a admissibility condition for all appeals but is particular in liability cases. Linking the litigation means the application must target an administrative act, not merely conduct. Thus, in abuse of power and objective full litigation appeals, linking is automatic since the object is an administrative act. In liability cases, there may not be an underlying act. Therefore, before filing with the competent administrative court, the applicant must submit an indemnity claim to the administration, quantifying the compensation (unless the damage extent is unknown). Only after an express or implied response can the applicant file with the administrative judge. The applicant's grounds must demonstrate a faulty generating fact, damage causing prejudice to the victim, and causation. Indemnity claims must request an amount from the judge. The judge assesses the damage's reality, the administration's faulty actions, and causation. The judge also evaluates the prejudice amount using tools like loss of chance or indemnity reference frameworks from the National Office for Compensation of Medical Accidents. The judge awards compensation based on the prejudice evaluation, per the prohibition on administrative liberality and the ban on judging supra petita.

=== Interim relief ===
There are various types of interim relief, each with different judicial powers.

==== Emergency interim relief ====
Emergency interim relief addresses situations requiring swift judicial intervention, which substantive appeals—with judgment delays up to a year—cannot provide. Urgency is key, but assessed differently based on the judge's statutorily required response time.

===== Freedom interim relief =====
The freedom interim relief was created by the law of 30 June 2000. It is an emergency procedure where the judge must rule within 48 hours. It allows the administrative judge to end a situation causing a "serious and manifestly illegal" infringement of fundamental rights and freedoms. The judge's powers are maximal, as they can order all necessary measures to end the situation. For instance, in the Vincent Lambert case, the emergency judge suspended the execution of the decision to stop treatments and ordered a medical expertise.

===== Suspension interim relief =====
The suspension interim relief allows the administrative judge to suspend a decision's execution where there is serious doubt as to its legality and it harms the litigant's interests. It compensates for the non-suspensive nature of substantive appeals. Suspension interim relief must be accompanied by a substantive appeal, or it is inadmissible. The judge can suspend the disputed act but not reform it, as that requires substantive jurisdiction given the limited time to rule.

==== Other interim relief ====
These are interim relief procedures enabling the judge to order useful measures quickly. The judge's powers are determined by the relief's purpose and the often temporary nature of the decision, which implies substantive re-examination.

== Administrative courts ==
The Council of State is the supreme administrative court: it acts as a court of cassation for other administrative courts while retaining first-instance and appellate jurisdiction. The general administrative courts are the administrative tribunals and administrative courts of appeal. The terms "administrative justice" and "administrative court" are often used, by abuse of language, to refer only to courts governed by the Code of Administrative Justice (or even just administrative tribunals and administrative courts of appeal).

Specialized administrative courts also exist.

=== Council of State ===
Judicial review of administrative bodies was established by Article 52 of the Constitution of the Year VIII. From the outset, it had a dual mission: participating in drafting important texts and adjudicating administrative disputes. An entrance examination was instituted to recruit auditors, a new title in administration—the titles of masters of requests and councilors of state were taken from the old King's Council.

Thereafter, the existence of the Council of State was not questioned. It remained in the Charter of 1814, though with a lesser role. The law of 24 May 1872 maintained it and reformed its duties: it granted it delegated justice (i.e., the ability to render justice "in the name of the French people"). The same year, the Tribunal of Conflicts was created to resolve attribution conflicts between administrative and judicial jurisdictions.

==== Judicial activity ====
This now constitutes only half of its activity, involving only the litigation section. Quantitatively, the Council has reduced its litigation activity due to the creation of administrative courts of appeal (1987).

===== First and last instance judge =====
The Council is the sole judge for major cases: appeals against decrees and ministerial regulatory acts, decisions of national collegial bodies (e.g., the Arcom), disputes involving certain officials appointed by presidential decree, regional and European elections.

===== Appellate judge =====
Since the creation of administrative courts of appeal (CAA), it retains only appeals from municipal and cantonal elections and legality assessment appeals (seeking not annulment but a declaration of illegality).

===== Cassation judge =====
The Council of State is the supreme court of the administrative order. Upon a cassation appeal, it can annul decisions of administrative courts of appeal (CAA), specialized administrative courts (National Court of Asylum Law, Court of Accounts, etc.), or even administrative tribunals when they judge in first and last instance.

In case of cassation, the Council of State may refer the case to a court of the same level as the one annulled or decide on the merits for good administration of justice.

==== Consultative activity ====
This fits the advisory logic of the body: advising the French government and, in some cases, Parliament (since the constitutional revision of 23 July 2008). It includes examining bills and ordinances before submission to the Council of Ministers, drafts of decrees qualified as "decree in Council of State", and private member's bills at the request of the President of the National Assembly or Senate. The Council of State issues an opinion (public or not, at the government's discretion) on the legal regularity, form, and administrative appropriateness of these texts.

It may also be freely consulted by the government on any legal or administrative question or difficulty.

==== Organization ====
Second-class auditors are recruited via the National School of Administration (renamed the National Institute of Public Service on 1 January 2022). Each year, five to seven positions are offered. Advancement within the Council is by seniority: after about three years, auditors become masters of requests, then councilors of state about twelve years later.

One in four masters of requests and one in three councilors of state are appointed from outside; the Vice-President of the Council of State selects them from magistrates of Administrative Courts of Appeal and Administrative Tribunals.

The Council of State has about 300 members, 100 of whom are on detachment. They are distributed as follows: about 100 councilors, 70 masters of requests, and 20 auditors. The Council of State is presided over by its vice-president, but the general assembly may be presided over by the Prime Minister and, in their absence, by the Keeper of the Seals. Since 2018, Bruno Lasserre has been vice-president of the Council of State, succeeding Jean-Marc Sauvé.

==== Number of cases ====
In 1999, the Council of State handled 12,330 cases (net after deducting "series" of litigation), or 8,817 after deducting ordinances from the president of the Litigation Section (concerning only jurisdiction allocation and appeals against legal aid decisions); 57% of these cases involved only immigration litigation (defined as judging disputes over decisions on entry, stay in France, or removal of a foreign national, or accessory acts). 38% of cases judged that year were at first instance, 24% on appeal, and 38% on cassation. The Council of State's 1999 public report set goals to reduce immigration litigation and shorten proceedings, notably to avoid condemnation by the ECtHR.

Excluding series of litigation, the net number of cases registered by the Council of State was 9,744 in 2009 (after a peak of 12,074 in 2005), or 8,606 after deducting ordinances from the president of the Litigation Section, with an average foreseeable judgment time for stocked cases of 9.5 months. In 2021, the judgment time at the Council of State fell to 7 months, a 35% decrease since 2011, for 11,633 cases judged (with notable growth in interim relief).

The 2024 administrative jurisdiction activity report (for 2023) provides the following statistics on the contentious activity of administrative jurisdictions:

Judicial activity of the administrative order in 2023
Level of jurisdiction	Cases registered	Cases judged	Cases pending	Average foreseeable judgment time (pending cases)
Administrative tribunals	257,329	243,089	214,292	10 months 17 days
Administrative courts of appeal	31,586	32,144	28,303	10 months 17 days
Council of State	9,574	9,746	5,205	6 months 12 days

=== Administrative courts of appeal ===
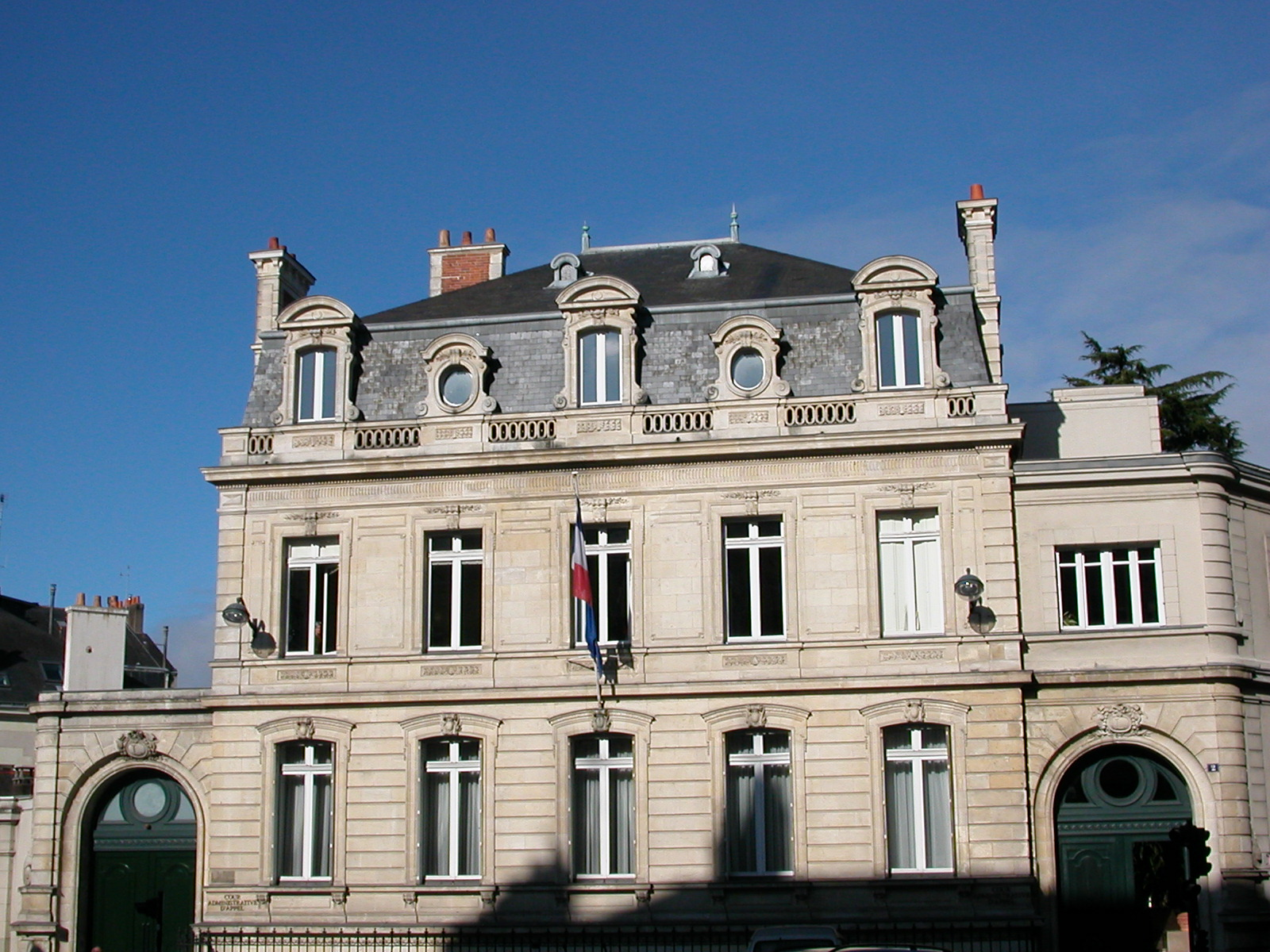
Nantes Administrative Court of Appeal.

Administrative courts of appeal (CAA) were created by the law of 31 December 1987 on administrative litigation reform. Their establishment was gradual starting 1 January 1989: five CAAs were created (Paris, Lyon, Nancy, Nantes, Bordeaux). In 1997, the Marseille CAA was created, in 1999 Douai, and in 2004 Versailles.

They are the common-law appellate judges of the administrative order, except for certain litigation directly under the Council of State. Their jurisdictions have evolved: in 1989, for example, they did not handle abuse of power litigation. Since 2015, they may also have first and last instance jurisdiction in certain disputes. This mainly involves environmental, urban planning, and built heritage litigation.

Administrative courts of appeal are presided over by a councilor of state. They are heavily backlogged: in 1998, 14,390 cases entered, 9,199 were judged, but 29,334 were pending (a 3-year delay). 14% of administrative tribunal (TA) decisions are appealed to CAAs, and 16% including the Council of State.

Members of administrative tribunals and administrative courts of appeal belong to the same corps. They are civil servants acting as magistrates. They are irremovable. They are recruited:

- via the National School of Administration (renamed the National Institute of Public Service on 1 January 2022)
- through a supplementary recruitment competition
- by detachment
- by external appointment

=== Administrative tribunals ===
Administrative tribunals (TA), created in 1953, are heirs to the former prefectural councils established by the law of 28 Pluviôse Year VIII, becoming common-law first-instance administrative judges where previously it was the Council of State. Originally, the Council was the appellate instance for TAs.

Currently, there are 43 administrative tribunals. There is approximately one per region or overseas collectivity, but Île-de-France has five (Paris, Versailles, Cergy-Pontoise, Melun, and Montreuil since November 2009). Geographic jurisdiction is thus: disputes are brought before the TA in whose area the challenged administrative authority's seat is located, explaining the backlog at the Paris tribunal. For administrative contracts, it is the tribunal of the contract's execution place.

In 1998, 123,834 cases entered, 104,615 were judged, and 207,920 were pending, a two-year delay. Litigation before TAs has greatly increased: about 20,000 cases annually in 1970, 50,000 in 1985.

== Specialized administrative courts ==
Besides standard administrative courts (Council of State, administrative courts of appeal, and administrative tribunals), there are courts within the administrative order handling more specific disputes.

=== Financial courts ===
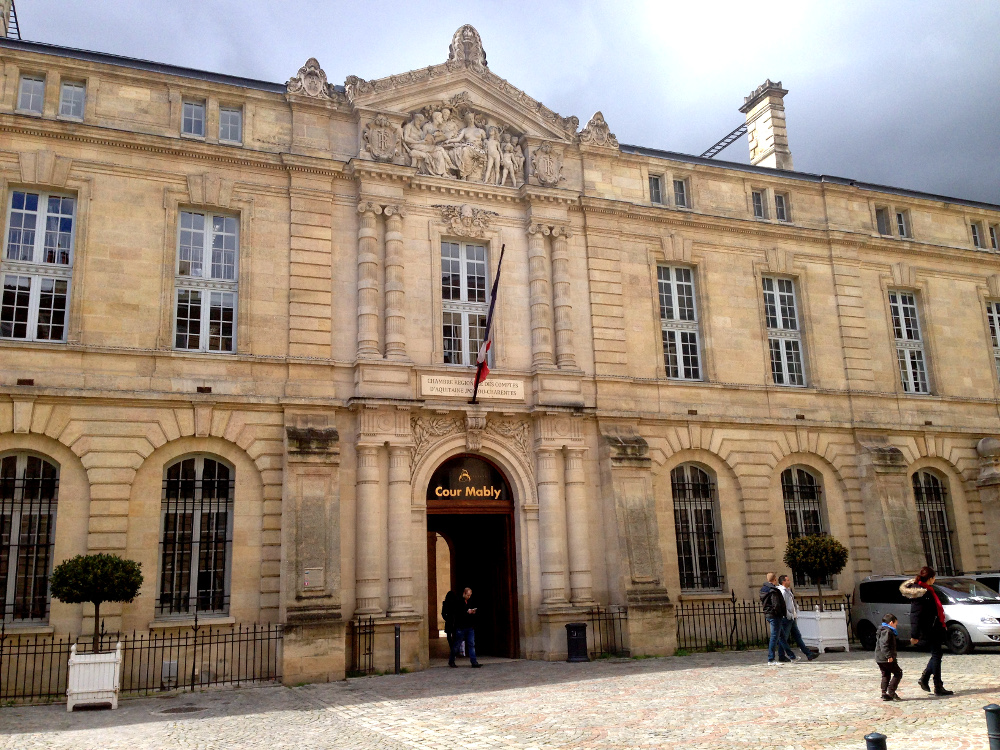
Regional Chamber of Accounts of Aquitaine, Poitou-Charentes, in Bordeaux

Financial courts form a sub-order within the administrative jurisdiction, with the Council of State as cassation judge. Until 31 December 2022, regional and territorial chambers of accounts issued judgments appealable to the Court of Accounts (double degree). Court of Accounts rulings, whether standalone or on appeal from regional/territorial chambers, could be cassated by the Council of State. Until 31 December 2022, the Court of Budgetary and Financial Discipline, a unique autonomous court sharing logistics with the Court of Accounts, issued rulings only cassatable by the Council of State. From 1 January 2023, financial court litigation is handled by the single contentious chamber of the Court of Accounts, with rulings appealable to the new Financial Court of Appeal, the Council of State remaining the cassation judge.

==== Court of Accounts ====
The Court of Accounts is a court which, under Article 47-2 of the 1958 Constitution,

assists Parliament in overseeing Government action. It assists Parliament and the Government in overseeing the execution of finance laws and social security financing laws, as well as in evaluating public policies. Through its public reports, it contributes to informing citizens.

It:

- judges the regularity of public accounts of the state and its public establishments,
- oversees the use of public funds by state decision-makers, national public services, private organizations receiving state or European aid, and funds collected by associations appealing to public generosity,
- informs Parliament, the Government, and the public on its findings.

It received a new competence from the Organic Law on Finance Laws of 2001: certifying the state's annual accounts.

==== Regional and territorial chambers of accounts ====
The Court of Accounts' action is replicated by regional and territorial chambers of accounts (CRTC) at the level of territorial collectivities (regions, departments, communes) and their local public establishments (communal groupings, high schools, hospitals, etc.).

==== Court of Budgetary and Financial Discipline ====
In effect until 31 December 2022, the Court of Budgetary and Financial Discipline (CDBF), unlike the Court of Accounts and regional/territorial chambers, could judge all public fund managers, whether the organization is public (administration; public establishment) or private, provided it receives public funds and falls under the control of the Court of Accounts and regional/territorial chambers: public enterprise; public interest grouping; consular body; association appealing to public generosity; subsidized organization. The CDBF could fine them (maximum: 2 years' income) for infringing texts governing public management and finances. Some managers escape its jurisdiction because their liability is political and exercised before the National Assembly or relevant deliberative assembly: ministers and local executive heads (mayors, departmental or regional council presidents). The CDBF could not self-refer but could be seized via its public prosecutor by a minister, the Senate or National Assembly president, the Court of Accounts, or regional/territorial chambers. Additionally, all administration creditors victimized by non-execution of a court decision could directly seize it to condemn the administration for refusal to execute.

This liability regime ended on 1 January 2023, replaced by the new contentious chamber of the Court of Accounts and the financial court of appeal (double degree).

=== Social courts ===
Disputes over financing social or medico-social establishments and services and hospitals are submitted to an Interregional Tribunal for Health and Social Tariffs and, on appeal, to the National Court for Health and Social Tariffs.

=== Education ===
Administrative courts exist within higher education. Indeed, academic councils formed as disciplinary sections of public establishments of a scientific, cultural, and professional nature and other public higher education establishments under the minister for higher education's supervision qualify as administrative courts. Appeals go to the National Council for Higher Education and Research in its disciplinary formation. The Disciplinary jurisdiction of teaching and hospital staff members is also an administrative court.

=== Professional order courts ===
Certain professional order councils have administrative court status, such as the Council of the Order of Physicians, the National Order of Dental Surgeons, or the National Chamber of Veterinary Discipline.

=== Other specialized administrative courts ===
The National Court of Asylum Law and the Commission for Paid Parking Litigation are specialized administrative courts.

=== Former administrative courts ===
The academic councils of national education and the Higher Council of Education persist as administrative bodies but are no longer courts since 2015.

The departmental social assistance commissions and the Central Commission for Social Assistance were abolished in 2018 in favor of judicial order courts.

The pensions jurisdictions (pensions tribunal and regional pensions court), created in 1919 and abolished on 1 November 2019, examined appeals on pensions and benefits under the Code of Military Invalidity Pensions and War Victims.

== See also ==
- Administrative law
- Judiciary of France
- Tribunal des conflits
- Conseil d'État
- Cour des Comptes (France)

== Bibliography ==
- Broyelle, Camille (2020) [2001]. Contentieux administratif [Administrative Litigation]. Manuel (in French) (8th ed.). Paris: LGDJ / Lextenso. p. 548. ISBN 978-2-275-07247-0.
- Chapus, René (2008) [1982]. Droit du contentieux administratif [Law of Administrative Litigation]. Domat. Droit public (in French) (13th ed.). Paris: Montchrestien. p. 1540. ISBN 978-2-7076-1587-9.
