= Social protection in France =

Welfare in France (also known as social protection, from French: Protection sociale) includes all systems whose purpose is to protect people against the financial consequences of social risks (illness, maternity, old age, unemployment).

Social welfare refers to all the mechanisms of collective foresight, enabling individuals to cope with the financial consequences of "social risks". These are situations that could jeopardize the economic security of the individual or their family (defined as a group of people bound by ties of lineage and alliance), causing a decline in its resources or increase its expenditure (old age, sickness, disability, unemployment, maternity, family responsibilities, etc.). In France, the welfare system make up for about 500 billion euros annually, or more than 30% of GDP.

The origin of social protection in France dates back to medieval times, with fraternal benefit societies. In the second half of the nineteenth century, systems of social assistance developed gradually, often launched by employers marked by social Catholicism, then relayed by the first laws. In 1930, modern social insurance was created, offering employees protection against certain risks: accidents, sickness, disability, maternity, old age, death ... During the Second World War, the National Council of Resistance designed the system of social security, now at the heart of social protection. It was created just after the Liberation, by an order of 4 October 1945, followed by other texts. Gradually, protection has covered the entire population, while the benefits extend.

When creating Social Security, France imitated more the Bismarckian system (insurance for workers) than the Beveridge one (widespread solidarity). Over the years, the solidarity (as opposed to a system of contributions) has gradually developed in the French system, which the foundation remains the concept of insurance. However, the desire to establish a universal system has faced opposition. This explains why the French welfare system is plural, with a wide variety of actors. The most important is the general scheme for employees of industry, commerce and services.

== Overview ==
The French social protection system is gradually becoming universal, covering all individuals. At its origins (end of the nineteenth century), social protection has been built as a system of social insurance. Insurance was tied to the exercise of an occupation and the benefits were provided in case of the risk of loss of income due to the forced inactivity (accident, sickness, unemployment, old age). It only covered workers and their families. The right to social benefits depended on the payment of social security contributions, itself related to earnings. Non-employees, or individuals who have not contributed during their occupation, were entitled to welfare, reserved for cases of extreme distress.

Since its creation on October 4, 1945, Social Security administrations has had the objective of gradually extending social protection to all residents of the territory. Each member of the national community has now the right to benefit a minimum standard of living, whether exercising a profession and regardless of the ability to contribute. Indeed, the 22 August 1946 law extended the family allowances to the entire population.

The old age risk coverage has been almost universal since the establishment of minimum pension (1956) guaranteeing everyone a minimum pension, regardless of contributions to the mandatory pension insurance scheme. Health insurance has become universal after the establishment of personal insurance in case of sickness (1978) and especially since the Universal health coverage, established in 1999, allowing everyone to access a minimum of care. In addition, the "social minima", benefits ensuring a minimum income to a person in an insecure situation, offer anyone a minimum of resources to fight against the risk of social exclusion.

== Organisation ==
The social protection is largely dependent on the state. The state is a key player in the field of social protection. It produces legal texts, oversees the various agencies (including the Social Security administrations) and partly finance social protection through taxes or subsidies. However, it plays a role more or less important in the various forms of social protection. Universal social protection is organized into four levels.

=== Social Security ===
A building of the Sécurité Sociale at Rennes

The Social Security administrations provides basic coverage of four kind of risks: illness (i.e. illness, maternity, disability, death), employment (i.e. accident at work and occupational disease), old age and family. Each of these four risks correspond to a branch. The system is divided in different schemes classifying people according to their professional activity. These four schemes are:

- general scheme: it includes most employees, students, recipients of certain benefits and ordinary residents
- special schemes (including the special retirement plans): they cover employees who are not in the private sector (civil servants)
- agricultural scheme: it assures the welfare of farmers and agricultural workers.
- autonomous scheme: they cover separate artisans, merchants, industrials and liberal professions for old age only (the risk of "disease" is treated in the common system)

Social Security administrations, established by the State in 1945, are managed by the social partners (employers' representatives and trade unions). The resources of Social Security (payroll taxes, i.e. social contributions) and expenses (benefits and allowances) has been determined since 1996 by the laws of social security funding, voted annually by the Parliament. The funds are collected by the URSSAF.

=== Complementary schemes ===
The complementary schemes provide additional coverage for risks already covered by Social Security. Some are mandatory (supplemental pension plans of private sector employees) and other optional (mutual health insurance, pension plans). Social partners set only the amount of revenue and expenditure allocated to these schemes. However, there are mandatory schemes (unemployment insurance or pensions of employees), and schemes who remain optional (mutual benefit societies).

=== UNEDIC ===
The UNEDIC (National Union for Employment in Industry and Commerce) administers the unemployment insurance system.

=== Central government ===
The central government and the local administrations provide some assistance, mainly support to the poorest. Social assistance includes welfare benefits defined by law, and is therefore provided when conditions are met. They are provided and funded mainly by departments, but also by the central government (RMI or allowance for disabled adults).

== Budget ==
The budget of social protection coverage is constantly increasing, and follows the growth of welfare spending. Sources of funding fall into three categories: individual contributions, "allocated taxes" (called so because the social protection is traditionally not financed by taxes) and contributions of the central government.

=== Social contributions ===
In recent years, the share of resources financing social protection has been changing. Traditionally, French social protection was financed by contributions rather than by taxes. Over the last three decades, there has been a reduction in the proportion of contributions (although still the primary source of funding) and an increase in funding from broader fiscal measures. In particular, revenue from the General Social Contribution (CSG), created in 1991, has increased considerably to become the second most important fiscal stream in France (after VAT). This development has arisen from the need to finance social protection not only with deductions from earnings, but also from a broader base. It also helps distinguish the financing of benefits corresponding to national solidarity from those covered by insurance. France has thus come closer to the average European Union member's social protection financing structure, although it remains among the countries having the highest percentage of direct contributions relative to earnings.

Social security contributions are mandatory payments made by the self-employed and employees (and their employers) to acquire rights to social benefits. They are not considered taxes in France, while in many Anglo-Saxon countries these contributions correspond to the payroll tax (or to a "pseudo-tax" by simply being added to total government revenue). The distinction between taxes and contributions is justified by the fact that contributions provide for direct benefits, while taxes are part of a solidarity system. There are five social security contributions that correspond to various risks. The traditional contributions are sickness-maternity-insurance-disability-death, old age, widowhood, and accidents at work. In 2004, the new solidarity contribution for autonomy (CSA) has been implemented. It is paid by private and public employers for health insurance.

Social contributions represent a major part of social welfare (66% in 2007). Indeed, social protection was built in France on a logic of social insurance system inspired by that implemented by Bismarck in Germany in the late nineteenth century. Their proportion has tended to decrease since the 1990s, because they are being replaced by fiscal resources, but also because of various contribution exemptions.

=== Assigned taxes ===
The funding by the tax "assigned taxes" constitutes a growing share of Social Welfare (nearly 21% in 2007, excluding transfers). This increase responds to the need not to weigh the financing of social benefits solely on labor income, and distinguish the financing of benefits under the National Solidarity and those of insurance. The "assigned taxes" are fiscal resources allocated to the financing of social benefits. They include:

- transfers of tax revenue permanently paid to the scheme of farmers;
- some taxes on products (excise duties on alcohol and tobacco, taxes on car insurance, taxes on polluting activities);
- taxes on wages and labor;
- taxes on income and wealth. They constitute the largest share of "assigned taxes". Among them is the general social contribution (CSG), founded in 1991. The CSG is the main fiscal resource for the social protection (66% of assigned taxes in 2007).

==== The General Social Contribution ====
The Generalized Social Contribution (CSG) is a tax to fund health insurance family benefits and the Retirement Solidarity Fund (FSV).

==== Central government contributions ====
Contributions of the central government and attached bodies made up 10% of the social protection in 2007. They finance expenditure for solidarity purposes, including the Revenu Minimum d'Insertion (assurance of minimum income) and Fonds de solidarité vieillesse (solidarity fund retirement). They also finance part of employers’ contributions exemptions for low wages and subsidize some schemes (pension plans of certain professions in which the number of active contributors is less than the number of retirees).

== Allowances ==
Social benefits amount to 30% of gross domestic product and around 45% of household income. Three quarters of these benefits are paid by social security. The Social Welfare Report, published annually distinguishes five categories of benefits for as many risks:

- The pension and survival risk. The most important, it represents 44% of benefits, due to the weight of pensions.
- The health risk. It includes illness, disability, occupational accidents and diseases. In 2006, it accounted for 35% of benefits.
- The maternity and family risk. It includes daily allowances, the allowance for young children, family allowances, aid for child care and the bulk of housing assistance. It represents 9% of benefits.
- The employment risk. It consists of unemployment benefits, aid to reinsertion and professional rehabilitation, and early retirement, accounting for 7% of benefits.
- The risk of poverty and exclusion. It is taken in charge by 80% by the minimum income (RMI), and accounts for 2% of benefits.

== History ==
The 1789 French Revolution replaced the solidarity performed in the home or business (corporations) by a national solidarity based on assistance, made official in the United Nations' 1948 Universal Declaration of Human Rights. In practice little was done by the state. Private societies had long existed, catering to small groups of middle-class families who sought death and burial insurance.

After 1830 in France Liberalism and economic modernization were key goals. While liberalism was individualistic and laissez-faire in Britain and the United States, in France liberalism was based instead on a solidaristic conception of society, following the theme of the French Revolution, Liberté, égalité, fraternité ("liberty, equality, fraternity"). In the Third Republic, especially between 1895 and 1914 “Solidarité” ["solidarism"] was the guiding concept of a liberal social policy, whose chief champions were the prime ministers Leon Bourgeois (1895–96) and Pierre Waldeck-Rousseau (1899-1902). The French welfare state expanded when it tried to followed some of Bismarck's policies. Poor relief was the starting point.

During the Industrial Revolution in the nineteenth century, some new forms of protection emerged. The fraternal benefit societies, succeeding the corporations of the Old Regime abolished in 1791, based on voluntary collective foresight and limited to some activities or some businesses. They were legally recognized in 1835, and obtained full freedom of establishment and encouragement of the State in 1898, leading to hundreds of mutual aid societies with voluntary membership. Their main purpose was to provide health care and funerals for their members. They reached middle-class families and skilled workers, but few poor people. By 1904 the new National Mutualist Federation of France (FNMF) had 2 million members.

In 1893 France established a limited program of free medical assistance in urban areas. New laws modernized the medical profession, and provided services for the aged and infirm in 1905. The number of infants assisted grew from 95,000 in 1871 to 231,000 in 1912. In 1904 the department of child welfare was created and in 1905 assistance to infirm and incurable old people. Mutual benefit societies, based on volunteering and social assistance, had benefited only a limited portion of the population. This is why early in the twentieth century, there were attempts to implement the insurance of certain social risks. In 1898 was recognized the responsibility of the employer in case of accidents on the workplace, with the possibility to ensure to cope with that risk. For old people a law in 1910 established a compulsory insurance scheme for employees of trade and industry. Laws in 1928 and 1930 set up insurance for the risks of illness, maternity, invalidity, old age and death for employees, plus a special scheme for farmers. In 1932, a law provided families with allowances to cover expenses, financed by employer. On the eve of World War II, France had a comprehensive protection system but its coverage lagged far behind Germany, Britain and smaller countries. More attention was paid to industrial labour in the mid-1930s during a short period of socialist political ascendency, with the Matignon Accords and the reforms of the Popular Front. These reforms were expanded the Vichy regime in the 1940–42.

In 1945 the objectives for the system of social security were the unification of the system, the generalization of the protection and the extension of the coverage of risks, under the dual influence of Beveridge report of 1942 and the Bismarckian roots. The 4 October 1945 Order provides a coordinated network of caisses replacing the multiple previous agencies. However, the unit was not achieved at that time. Agricultural occupations retained their specific institutions. Employees benefiting special arrangements refused to integrate into the general system, and retained their own system, declared "transitional", but which is still lasting. These specific arrangements concern officials, sailors, railway workers, miners, among others. The 19 October 1945 Order built a system for illness, maternity, invalidity, old age, death. A law in 1946 extended the family allowances to the entire population and another law incorporated injury at work to Social Security.

=== Recent evolution ===
In recent years, there were growing concerns about the rise in social exclusion among the population. According to a survey published by the CREDOC, a third of people between 25 and 59 had difficulty of insertion (unemployment during more than a year, beneficiaries of minimum social assistance or helped contract). On 2 October 2007, the newly elected French President Nicolas Sarkozy announced the organization of a Grenelle Insertion dedicated to the transformation of integration policies. Dedicated to return to work, the Grenelle insertion was concluded on 27 May 2008. It insisted on the need to reform the insertion system.

The various measures that had implemented to fight social exclusion -in particular the income support allowance (RMI), the single parent allowance (API) and the allocation disabled adult (AAH)- were criticized for favoring unemployment and working poverty, exclusion and precariousness. Indeed, the government claimed the gains from return to work, after a period of unemployment, were offset by the reduction of social benefits paid in the previous period. That led to threshold effects and to inactivity trap situations. The National Observatory of Poverty and social exclusion said that the number of excluded people was deteriorating, while the number of working poor's was increasing (1.7 million in 2005).

The Grenelle Insertion was initiated in November 2007 to establish, for 6 months, negotiations and talks between social partners to rethink the whole system of insertion. Notably, it was decided that the income of active solidarity (RSA) be implemented. The RSA is intended to offset the loss of certain social benefits when resuming employment and provides additional income to the working poor.

== See also ==
- Taxation in France
- Social security in France
- Government of France
