= Caisse d'allocations familiales =

French social security system sector

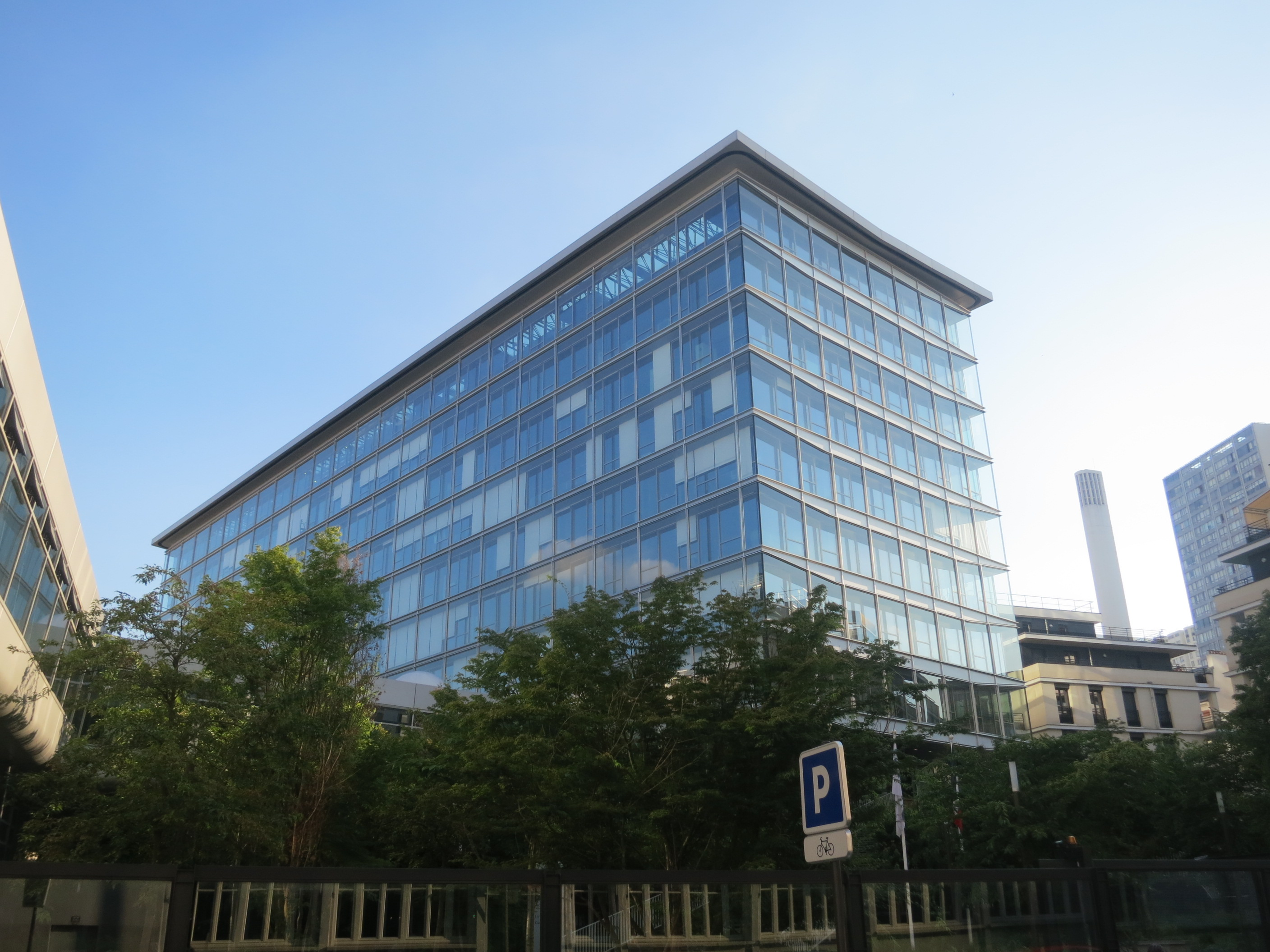
- CAF headquarters in Paris.
- Type: Organisation nationale française
- Headquarters: France
- Official language: French
- Affiliations: Social security
- Website: caf.fr

The Caisses d'allocations familiales (Family Allocations Offices, or CAF) are the local bodies of the family branch of the French social security system. Coordinated at national level by the Caisse nationale des allocations familiales (National Office for Family Allocations, or CNAF), the network of 101 local offices pays family, housing and social-minimum benefits such as the RSA and the AAH.

According to the CNAF, the network serves nearly 13.5 million beneficiaries (allocataires), or about 32 million people when spouses and children are included.

== Background ==
The first caisses de compensation (equalisation funds) were created by employers from 1918 to pay supplements to workers with dependent children. The law of 11 March 1932 (loi Landry) made affiliation to these funds compulsory for employers in industry and commerce, and the Code de la famille of 29 July 1939 extended entitlement to all working French citizens regardless of income.

The ordinance of 4 October 1945 ended the employers' monopoly and integrated the family allowance funds into the unified social security system. The local CAF were set up in 1946, and the national fund (CNAF) in 1967.

== The allowances ==
Family benefits are not taxable, but subject to the contribution for the reimbursement of social debt with the exception of social minima such as RSA, AAH and formerly API and RMI. Their amount is set by legislative texts as a percentage of the monthly basis for calculating Family Allowances.

They are in principle unassignable and unseizable except:

- in the event of fraud or false declaration;
- for the recovery of maintenance claims (canteen costs in particular);
- for the recovery of healthcare costs (hospitalization for example);
- regarding the housing allowance where benefits can be paid directly to the lessor in certain cases.

Without exception, family benefits are paid monthly and in arrears and are due from the first day of the calendar month following the month in which the conditions for entitlement are met. Subject to the rules specific to each service, the prescription is biennial. The end of entitlement is fixed on the first day of the calendar month during which the conditions for opening the entitlement cease to be met, except in the event of death (in this case, the termination of entitlement is the month following the death).

=== Current benefits ===
Family benefits are today grouped around four main categories. Many of them are calculated as a percentage of the base mensuelle de calcul des allocations familiales (BMAF), set at 478.16 € from 1 April 2026.

- Early childhood (PAJE), which comprises the birth or adoption grant, the basic allowance, the shared child education benefit (PreParE) and the childcare supplement (CMG).
- Support for children, including family allowances, the family supplement (complément familial), the family support allowance (ASF) and the back-to-school allowance (ARS).
- Disability, with the disabled child education allowance (AEEH), the daily parental presence allowance (AJPP) and the disabled adults allowance (AAH).
- Housing and minimum income, with housing aid, the revenu de solidarité active (RSA) and the activity bonus, which replaced the in-work component of the RSA and the prime pour l'emploi on 1 January 2016.

Amounts change every year and are published on the CAF website.

=== Historical snapshot (2007 to 2009) ===
In 2007, the family allowance funds paid the following benefits. Some of them have since been abolished or replaced, as noted below.

Birth, Adoption, Childcare

- Allowance for the birth of a child (prime à la naissance, 1710,49€ once)
- Basic allowance for a young child (allocation de base, PAJE, 171,06€/month)
- Adoption allowance
- Childcare supplement (complément de libre choix du mode de garde, CMG) to hire a licensed childminder (between 374,12€ and 748,24€/month).
- Allowance for raising children at home (between 134,13€ and 530,72€/month; now covered by the PreParE)
- Parental education allowance (between 256€ and 350,92€/month; now covered by the PreParE)

Children

- Child benefit (allocations familiales, between 119-152€/month, more for each child between the ages of 11-20)
- Family supplement (complément familial, 155€/month)
- Daily parental presence allowance (allocation journalière de présence parentale, AJPP, 39-47€/day + 101€/month)

Back to school

- Back-to-school allowance for the new school year (allocation de rentrée scolaire, ARS, 286,01€, paid in September)

Housing

- Housing aid
- Personalised housing aid
- Bonus for moving house (898-973€, once)
- Aid for scholarship students who move house (300€, once)
- Loan for improvement works to home (1% interest loan, maximum 1067,14€)

The single or separated parent

- Single parent allowance (allocation de parent isolé, API, between 52,90€ and 748,20€; abolished and replaced by the increased RSA on 1 June 2009)
- Family support allowance (allocation de soutien familial, ASF, 83,76€ - 111,68€/month)
- Recovery of unpaid alimony (the CAF takes legal action to force the other parent to pay alimony)

The disabled adult or child

- Disabled child education allowance (allocation d'éducation de l'enfant handicapé, AEEH, between 119,72€ - 1999,82€/month)
- Disabled adults allowance (allocation aux adultes handicapés, AAH, 621,27€)

The minimum salary

- Revenu de solidarité active (RSA) since 1 June 2009 (440,86€ - 925,81€/month)

== Governance and financing ==
The State sets the missions, benefits and resources of the family branch. Since 1996, an objectives and management agreement (convention d'objectifs et de gestion, COG), signed every five years (initially four), governs the relations between the State and the CNAF.

Like the other branches of social security, the family branch has three main sources of funding, namely social contributions, the CSG and other earmarked taxes. Employer contributions, assessed on uncapped wages, remain the largest component, but their share has been declining, from 63% of total resources in 2014 to 59.3% in 2019. Some benefits, such as the AAH and the activity bonus, are financed by the State.

== Controls and audits ==
The CAF verify beneficiaries' declarations through documentary and on-site checks. Since 2011, following authorisation by the CNIL, they have used data mining to target these checks. According to the CNAF, the tool is designed to identify situations likely to generate undue payments, most of which are not fraud, rather than to combat fraud.

The Cour des comptes refused to certify the accounts of the family branch for 2022, 2023 and 2024, and certified those of 2025 with reservations, according to a 2026 parliamentary hearing.
