= French Fifth Risk Plan =

The French Fifth Risk Plan aimed at curbing the risk of dependency for the elderly. The dependency risk is called in France the "fifth risk" because the Social Security is divided into four branches, each covering one so-called "risk": illness, old age, family and employment.

In France, the issue of support for elderly dependency is more and more acute: it is estimated today that four people from the baby boom generations will suffer from it.

== Overview ==
In 2008, the INSEE identified 1 314 920 persons aged over 85 years in France. In 2015, the figure is expected to reach than 2 million. The number of people with high handicap could rise from 660 000 in 2005 to 940 000 in 2025. Meanwhile, because of population aging, the average number of potential caregivers by dependent elderly person will tend to decrease.

As the four branches of the Social Security (sickness, diseases at work, family, old age) will not be able to cope with this demographic challenge, the Government plans to take care of dependency by the creation of a fifth risk, combining public funding for the solidarity and the establishment of an insurance system encouraged by tax incentives.

== Existing laws ==
The law of 24 January 1997, defines dependency as "a state in which the person who, notwithstanding the care that is likely to receive, needs support for the performance of actions essential to life or requires regular supervision".

In 2008, public spending related to the care of dependent elderly people (health care benefits and benefits of compensation for loss of autonomy) was around 19 billion euros per year, or 1% of GDP.

The law of 30 June 1975 established the third person compensatory allowance (Allocation compensatrice tierce personne or ACTP) for people with disabilities. It was funded by taxes, and was extended in 1983 to the elderly. It was replaced by the specific dependency allowance (Prestation spécifique dépendance) with the law of 24 January 1997, and was finally suppressed with the implementation of the individual allowance for autonomy (Allocation personnalisée à l’autonomie or APA) on 1 January 2002.

== Funding and implementation ==
In June 2007, the President of the Republic Nicolas Sarkozy expressed his will to introduce the fifth risk in the social protection system. This announcement was part of his desire to reform the system, considered too complex. The announcement was followed by consultations with social partners, along with the publication of several reports dealing with this issue. In particular, the main issue is determining the part to be paid thanks to national solidarity. The negotiations ended in December 2008.

Along with these negotiations, reports were published. The Gisserot report (March 2007) recommended the development of long-term care insurance alongside the APA. The reports of the Caisse nationale de solidarité pour l’autonomie (October 2007) and a report by the Senate (July 2008 ) were also published. The government declared that it would take these reports into account to propose a bill draft.

== The bill on dependency ==
The law for the financement of Social Security for 2009 already provided support for dependency and secured a better support for people with disabilities. It recalled the objectives assigned to the future draft bill on dependency to be created during the first half of 2009.

These main points are:

- implementing for persons with low autonomy a new universal right to assess the needs for accompanying
- improving the support at home, particularly in order to help those most dependent or isolated
- reducing the burden remains to persons residing in retirement homes
- ensuring the long-term funding of the protection from the fifth risk with a public-private collaboration
- renewing local and national governance of the medical-social sector
