= Grenelle Insertion =

The Grenelle de l'insertion or Grenelle Insertion, concluded on 27 May 2008, refers to an open multi-party debate in France that gathered representatives of national and local government and organizations (industry, labor, professional associations, non-governmental organizations) on an equal footing, with goal of unifying a position on the reform of the national policy of insertion. It insisted on the need to reform the insertion system to make it more attractive for people to return to work. It was held from November 2007 to May 2008, instigated by President Nicolas Sarkozy. It led to various reforms, among them the implementation of the Revenue of Active Solidarity (RSA) in 2008.

== Background ==
The organization of a Grenelle de l'insertion was announced by the President on 2 October 2007, to be dedicated to the transformation of political integration. The government pointed out that the insertion system had become increasingly complex and caused exclusion.

Gains from work are offset by the reduction of social benefits only paid in case of unemployment. A "Green Paper on integration", published in March 2008, noticed that the current allowances in case of unemployment -revenu minimum d’insertion (RMI), allocation parent isolé (API) and allocation adulte handicapé (AAH)- do not incite people to ge back to work and cause an inactivity trap to appear.

More than 7 million French people lived below the poverty line (817 euros per person per month) in 2007. In its 2007–2008 report, the National Observatory of Poverty and Social Exclusion found that the number has not increased since 2002, but their situation has deteriorated, while the phenomenon of working poor has increased. An estimated 1.5 million people in 2003 and 1.7 million in 2005 were concerned.

On 21 November 2007, the High Commissioner for Active Solidarity against poverty unveiled three objectives during the Grenelle insertion negotiations:

- placing the insertion at the heart of social debates by giving voice to professionals, associations and beneficiaries, and involving local authorities, businesses and social partners
- improving the overall performance of integration policies
- initiating substantive reforms, merging the dozen existing contracts in a single contract of integration in the public and private sectors.

== Evolution ==
Inspired by the Grenelle de l'environnement, the process of the Grenelle de l'insertion was initiated in Grenoble on 23 and 24 November 2007 to establish, for 6 months, "a time of collective negotiations to rebuild a more efficient integration system". It was presented as an opportunity to rethink the goals and characteristics of "helped contracts" (contrats aidés in French) and to experiment the revenu de solidarité active (RSA).

== Measures ==
=== Revenue of Active Solidarity (RSA) ===
From 1 June 2009, the revenue of active solidarity (RSA), in French Revenu de Solidarité Active will replace the minimum income (RMI), created 20 years earlier. Intended to fight against the phenomenon of working poor and to facilitate return to work. However, it was subject to public debate.

==== Background ====
The French policy of insertion led in the last decades was source of exclusion. The social measures taken over the last twenty years have increased unemployment and poverty at work, exclusion and insecurity.

For tan employee, the gains achieved with their hiring were often offset by the reduction of social benefits attributed to him when he was unemployed. This bad effect particularly concerned the RMI, the single parent allowance (API) and the disabled adult allowance (AAH). They do not incite someone to return to work and generated a "inactivity trap" effect.

In addition, the phenomenon of working poor was increasing: an estimated 1.5 million people in 2003 and 1.7 million in 2005 (data from the 2007–2008 of the National Observatory of poverty and social exclusion).

==== Aims and principles ====
The 1 December 2008 Act, consequence of the Grenelle de Insertion, provides the establishment of the RSA. The RSA is to replace, as from 1 June 2009 in metropolitan France and not later than 1 January 2011 for the DOM-TOM, the minimum subsistence income (RMI) and the single parent allowance (API).

The amount paid to unemployed beneficiaries will be at the same level as the RMI, with an increase for single people with children, of which the amount is equal to the previous allowance for single parent (API).

Individuals who go back to work will receive an additional income, a part of the RSA. The amount of this benefit will be equivalent to the amount of the former allocation (received during the unemployment period) minus 38% of the wage. This initial share of RSA decreases when the wage increases. Ad hoc benefits are also provided to cope with expenses related to the resumption of work (transport and childcare).

Finally, and on condition that they does not earn more than up to 1.04 the minimum wage, a worker with modest incomes can also benefit from the RSA.
