= Prime pour l'emploi =

The Prime pour l'emploi (PPE) was a French tax credit aimed at reducing the impact of falling Revenu de solidarité active (welfare benefits) for people returning to work. Implemented in 2001 by the government of Lionel Jospin, it was replaced by the prime d'activité in 2015.

In 2008, 8.7 million working people received the tax credit. The average amount was €36 per month.

== Amount ==
The amount depends on whether a person is single or in a couple and whether the income per person is between €3,473 and €17,451. The amount increases between the lower limit and €12,475 and then decreases until revenue reaches the upper limit.

Annual Revenue	Tax credit in % of income
€3,743 to €12,475	7.7%
€12,475 to €17,451	19.3% of the difference between the salary and the upper limit

== See also ==
- Guaranteed minimum income
- Poverty in France
- Revenu minimum d'insertion
- Working tax credit
