= Prime d'activité =

French social security benefit

The prime d'activité (English: employment bonus) is a French social security benefit created on August 17, 2015, relative to labor relations and employment. Stemming from the fusion of the Revenu de solidarité active (RSA) and the Prime pour l'emploi (PPE), the prime d'activité supports the occupation and buying power of low-income workers, rectifying certain problems posed by both the RSA and the PPE. As of January 1, 2016, the prime d'activité is issued by Caisse d'allocations familiales and Mutualité sociale agricole (fr).

== Creation and codification ==
The prime d'activité was created by the August 17 law #2015-994 relative to labour relations and employment:, title IV, and took effect on January 1, 2016. It is codified in book 8 of the social security code, specifically L 841-1 to L 847-1, R 842-1 to R 848-1 and D 843-1 to D 848-5. The provisions were finalised by simple decree (fr) #2015-1710 on 21 December 2015 and was published in the Journal officiel de la République française on 22 December 2016.

== Objectives and motivations of the prime d'activité ==
The creation of the prime d'activité is the result of several reports on two previous insufficient provisions regarding labor and low-income support, namely the RSA and the PPE.

The RSA, whose goal was to promote re-entry into the workforce without fear of earning less than unemployment benefits, was only used by a third of potential beneficiaries due to administrative complexities, fear of overcompensation (and thus repayment), and social stigma. Furthermore, in all but rare cases, the RSA was not issued to those under 25.

The PPE, a tax credit supplementing low-wage incomes, however, reached between 95% and 97% of potential beneficiaries, but allocated relatively low amounts (a monthly average of 33€ in 2014) with a one-year discrepancy in relation to employment.

The prime d'activité corrects these drawbacks. It is unconnected to the RSA and is issued monthly at a "fixed" three-month rate irrespective of any changes in employment, reducing the incidence of overcompensation, and can be claimed at age 18 with a simplified administrative process. The average amount allocated in 2015 was €170 per month.

The objective remains to encourage re-entry into the workforce, even into low-paying positions, and supplementing low incomes.

== Conditions ==
All earnings cited here are legally defined in relation to SMIC (fr) and are shown in monthly net in practice. On January 1, the net monthly SMIC was 1,130€.

- General conditions: To be a national of the European Economic Area (EEA) and to reside in France. For homeless individuals, they should select a place of residence at a Centre communal d'action sociale (fr) or another certified organization.
- Conditions specific to the prime d'activité: be on a regular stay in France for at least 5 years if foreign to the EEA.
- Conditions for employees: earn between €898.83€ and €1500 per month (79.5% to 133% of SMIC).
- Conditions for crafts persons and self-employed individuals: earn between €898.83 and €2742 per month (79.5% and 242.6% of SMIC).
- Conditions for storekeepers: earn less than €6850 in revenue per month (the actual income of the shopkeeper being only a fraction of the monthly revenue).
- Conditions for students and apprentices: earn at least €898.25 per month (78% of SMIC).
- Conditions for those earning less than €898.83 net per month (79.5% of SMIC): Proof of no other occupation (neither student nor apprentice).

== Amount ==
The prime d'activité is inversely proportional to earnings.

Example for a single childless earner in 2017

- €282 net per month (25% of SMIC): bonus of €185 per month.
- €1150 net per month (100% of SMIC): bonus of €132 per month.
- €1470 net per month (130% of SMIC): bonus of €15 per month.
