= URSSAF =

French social security agencies

- Organizations for the Collection of Social Security and Family Benefit Contributions
- Unions de Recouvrement des Cotisations de Sécurité Sociale et d'Allocations Familiales
- Formation: May 12, 1960; 66 years ago
- Type: Private entity in charge of a public service
- Headquarters: Paris, France
- Parent organization: Agence centrale des organismes de sécurité sociale (fr)
- Budget: €1,350,000,000
- Staff: 13455
- Website: www.urssaf.fr

The URSSAF (pronounced [yʁsaf]; Unions de Recouvrement des Cotisations de Sécurité Sociale et d'Allocations Familiales, meaning the Organizations for the Collection of Social Security and Family Benefit Contributions) is a network of private organizations created in 1960 whose main task is to collect employee and employer social security contributions that finance the Régime general (general account) of France's social security system, including state health insurance (Assurance maladie en France).

Chart of the Urssaf (the French social welfare collection agencies) incomes and exemptions for the 1998-2007 period, based on Urssaf-Acoss statistics published in Acoss Stat n°78.

They also manage two other salary deductions for the French Ministry of Public Action and Accounts:

- the Generalized Social Contribution (Contribution sociale généralisée, or CSG);
- the Social debt repayment contribution (Contribution au remboursement de la dette sociale, or CRDS: a contribution for the repayment of the French social security deficit).

URSSAF employees are not, as commonly assumed, civil servants, and thus they are covered by the same employment agreements as other social security employees.

Each organization is a private entity responsible for a particular public service and is headed by a Director.

Each of them (including the national fund) is controlled by an Administrative Council made up in equal parts of managers and workers. The decisions made by the Administrative Council are monitored by the State, represented by DRASS (Directions régionales des affaires sanitaires et sociales, or the regional director for health and social matters).

URSSAF organizations are spread across France to form a network totaling more than one hundred members (101 as of January 1, 2006), with at least one organization per department. Recovery decisions are subject to appeal in courts of general jurisdiction.

URSSAF is supervised primarily by the Ministry for Social Security, and secondarily by the Ministry for the Budget, Public Accounts and Civil Service.

The objectives of ACOSS (Agence centrale des organismes de sécurité sociale, or the central agency for social security organizations) have been recorded in three successive COGs (conventions d'objectifs et de gestion, or agreements on objectives and management), the first covering the period 1998-2001, the second 2002–2005, and the current version covering 2006-2009. ACOSS has had to work within the framework of this third COG to lay off 600 employees out of a workforce of 14,500 between now and 2009.

In DOMs (départements d'outre-mer, or overseas departments), URSSAF organizations do not exist as such, so social security contributions are collected by the CGSS (Caisses générales de sécurité sociale, or general social security funds).

ACOSS is the national fund for the entire group of organizations (as decreed by the law of July 25, 1994), including the CNAM-TS for health insurance, the CNAF for family benefits and the CNAV for retirement.

ACOSS manages the social security budget.

== Sources ==
- The 2002-2006 COG signed on May 31, 2006, by the Minister of Social Affairs, which expresses the objectives assigned to contribution collections and the need for 600 layoffs.
- Press release on the 2006-2009 COG
