= General principles of French law =

In French law, judges cannot create legal norms, because of the principle known as "la prohibition des arrêts de règlement" of Article 5 of the French civil code: "Judges are forbidden from pronouncing in a generally dispositive and regulatory fashion on the matters submitted to them." They can only put into evidence and interpret existing norms. This general principle underlies the state of existing law, which is merely uncovered by the judge.

The general principles of law, principes généraux du droit, PGD are rules of universal scope which:

- apply even when unwritten;
- are uncovered through case law;
- are not created but "discovered" by the judge, based on the state of law and society at a given point in time.

The Court of Justice of the European Union also recognizes general principles of law in European Union law. In international law, "general principles of law recognized by civilized nations" are considered a source of law under Article 38.1 (c) of the statute governing the International Court of Justice.

Traditionally, the general principles of law have a very minor role in civil law, which is essentially codified, and a much larger role in administrative law, which is largely based on case law, since for a very long time, very few texts of general scope covered all, or even most, administrative activities.

These general principles, and particularly their judicial interpretation, have been debated in legal theory. The expression "general principles of law" was consecrated after the Liberation of France by an arrêt about the rights of defendants. (principe des droits de la défense) The Tribunal des conflits cited this principle, in its decision of 8 February 1873, titled Dugave et Bransiet.

== Fundamental rules on the rights of citizens ==
=== Principles based on liberty ===
- Freedom of commerce and of industry: (Liberté du commerce et de l'industrie)

=== Principles based on equality ===
- Equality of users under public services
- Equality under tax law
- Equality in public payments
- Equal access of citizens to public employment
- Equal treatment for officials of the same agency
- Equality under the judicial system

=== Extradition law ===
The Conseil d'État has brought out a number of principles on this topic:

- No extraditions of political refugees
- No extraditions for political reasons Here the Conseil d'Etat is not recognizing a general principle of law but one of the fundamental principles recognized by the laws of the Republic
- No extradition that would have grave consequences, notably due to age and health
- No extraditions if the requesting state's legal system does not recognize fundamental rights and freedoms
- No extraditions if the requesting state can impose a death penalty and has not guaranteed that it will refrain from doing so

=== Rules of judicial administrative procedure ===
- Defendant rights in administrative matters (Droits de la défense en matière administrative) in penal law This principle has been recognized by the French Constutitional Council (Conseil constitutionnel) as among the fundamental principles recognized by the laws of the Republic, in criminal as well as in administrative law.
- All administrative actions are subject to appeal (Recourse for abuse of power in France)
- Proceedings in the judicial system must be held in public

=== Rules of unlitigated administrative procedure ===
- Administrative rules must be published.
- Administrative actions must not be retroactive. (Retroactivity in French law)
