= SASPA =

SASPA may refer to:

- Allocation de solidarité aux personnes âgées
- U.S.–Afghanistan Strategic Partnership Agreement
