= Generalized Social Contribution =

Social contribution tax

In France, the generalized social contribution (French: Contribution sociale généralisée or CSG) is a tax created on 18 December 1990 to fund the social protection system (namely health insurance and family benefits) and, since 2018, unemployment benefits.

The CSG aims to diversify the financing of social protection, based mainly on social contributions. The traditional system had become questionable because social contributions used to be a burden for employers, for contributions are levied on earnings, i.e. they are part of the labor costs. In addition, only incomes from work used to contribute.

The CSG enabled easing the burden of social security contributions on wages, to promote a way of funding consistent with the widespread use of Social Security benefits, and to force all household incomes to contribute (e.g. income from work but also property), contrary to social contributions. The revenues are significant (75 billion euros) and represent almost two-thirds of taxes allocated to social protection (65%). The CSG is currently the second most important tax in France, after the VAT.

== How it works ==
The CSG payable by all residents in France, except (for earned & retirement income) those who are not members of any French compulsory medical insurance scheme. It is levied at source on most income, excluding benefits and family. Its rate, modified in 2018, amounts to 9.2% for most categories of income, of which 2.4% is treated as taxable income for income tax. There are reduced rates for income from benefits (pensions, unemployment benefits).

The CSG tax base is reduced by 1.75% of the first €164,544 of earned income (that is 4 times the Social Security threshold (fr), a parameter fixed on a yearly basis by the government).

== History ==
Yearly Tax Receipts of the CSG since 1995 (in €bn)

The CSG was created by the Second Rocard government (fr) to diversify the financing sources of the French social protection system. The tax, created by the 1990 Finance Act, entered effect on 1 February 1991 at a time of relatively high economic growth and buoyant tax revenues.

Starting on 1 February 1991, the CSG rate was set at 1.1% to finance family benefits, replacing employer contributions to the family benefits regime.

On 1 January 1993 the CSG rate was bumped to 2.4% to finance the newly created Retirement Solidarity Fund (fr) (Fonds de solidarité vieillesse or FSV), which started operating in January 1994. The FSV is a non-contributory retirement regime which is tasked with providing universal retirement benefits to low-income retirees.

On 1 January 1997 the CSG rate was increased to 3.4% to finance the public health insurance regime and lottery winnings are from then on subjected to the CSG at the same rate. That increase is offset by a reduction of the employee contribution to the health insurance regime.

Until 31 December 1997 the CSG rate was identical for all types of income. From 1 January 1998 until 2018, specific rates exist for some types of income:

- The rate for interest income, dividends, capital gains and earned income (salaries, bonuses) is bumped to 7.5% to increase financing to the public health insurance regime;
- A special lower rate of 6.2% is applied to unemployment benefits and pension income.
