= Agessa =

French association

Agessa is a French association that manages social security taxation for individuals who earn money through licensing or sale of original, copyrighted material such as photographs, musical manuscripts or written texts. Agessa exists since January 1, 1978 and stands for Association pour la Gestion de la Sécurité Sociale des Auteurs (Association for the Management of Authors' Social Security).

Precise information regarding taxation can be obtained from the Agessa website, as the percentages and manners of payment change regularly. In recent years, a percentage of proceeds from copyright licensing in France must be paid directly to Agessa by the party obtaining the license.

For example, imagine that a script is licensed to a production company for the filming of a movie. If the contract of sale of the license to use the script stipulates that the production company will pay the author 10,000 euro, the production company will pay the author a lesser amount (in 2006, 9215.5 euro) and Agessa the remainder (in 2007, 784.5 euro).

It may be thought of as the equivalent of the tax withholding in the United States. The money withheld by the buyer does not account for all tax be paid.
