= Tribunal des conflits =

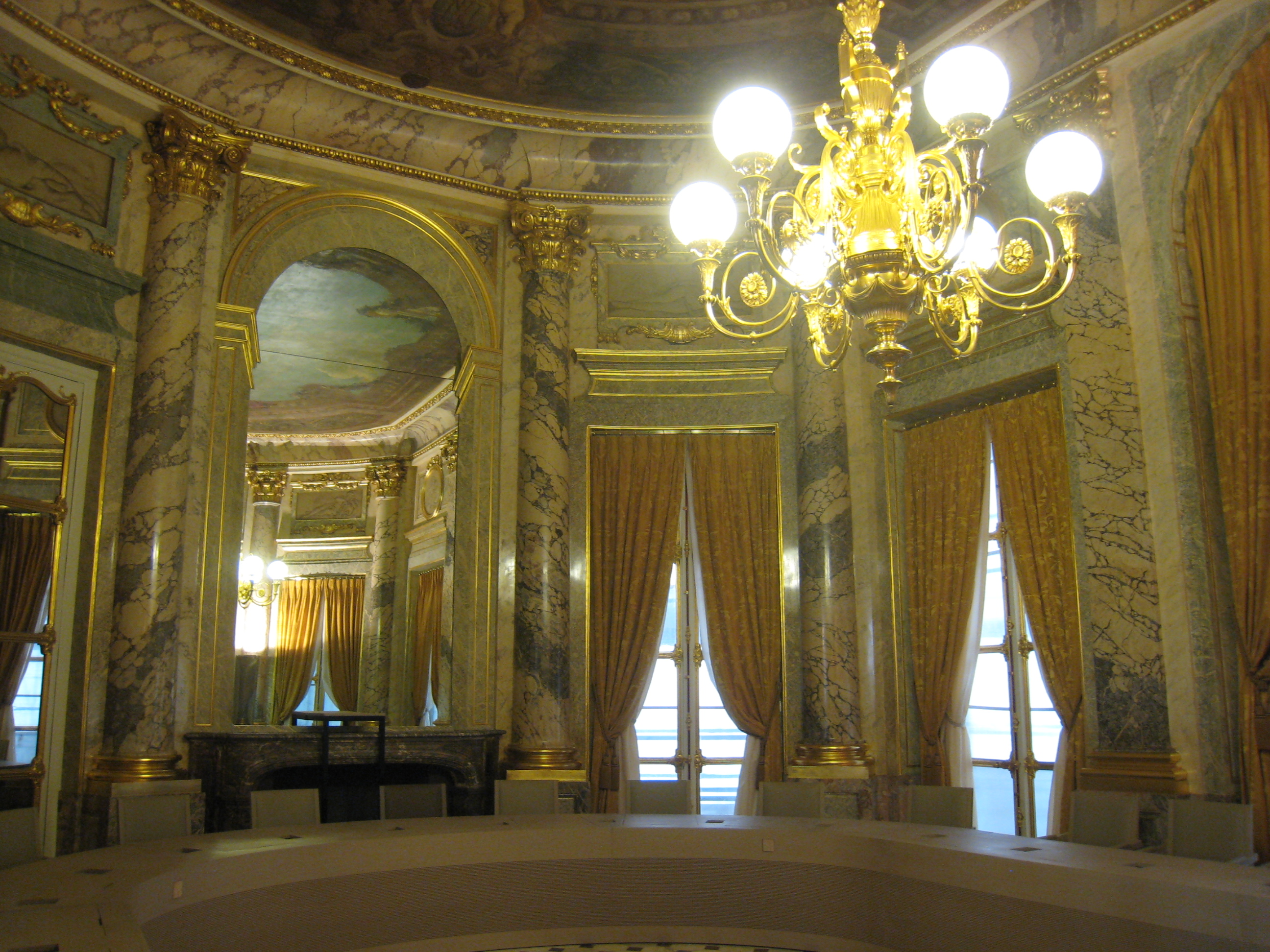
- Tribunal des conflits at Palais-Royal.
- 48.864444°N 2.3375°E
- Location: 1, Place du Palais-Royal; 75001 Paris, France
- Coordinates: 48.864444°N 2.3375°E
- Website: www.tribunal-conflits.fr

In France, the Tribunal des conflits is a court system charged with settling conflicts of jurisdiction between the judiciary and administrative courts of the French legal system and with preventing denials of justice born of conflicting decisions from the two branches. It was originally organized under the règlement du 28 octobre 1849 and the law of 4 February 1850, but it was abolished at the beginning of the Second Empire, then recreated by the law of 24 May 1872 reorganizing the Conseil d’État.

The tribunal de conflicts may be called on to decide whether an administrative judge (administrative court, Conseil d'État, etc.) or a judiciary judge (Tribunal judiciaire, Labour Court, Tribunal de commerce, etc.) should rule in a particular case, or sometimes to determine the solution to be applied when decisions from the two branches conflict.

Decisions of the Tribunal des conflits apply to all levels of the judiciary and administrative legal system and cannot be appealed. It is said to be paritaire, that is, made up of equal numbers of conseillers d'État and of magistrates from the Cour de cassation.

The Tribunal des conflits sits at the Palais-Royal and is housed in the offices of the Conseil d'État.

== See also ==
- Administrative jurisdiction in France
