= Allocation de solidarité aux personnes âgées =

The Allocation de solidarité aux personnes âgées (solidarity allowance for the elderly) (ASPA) is a French state pension for elderly people, whether former employees or not, on low incomes. It replaced the multiple components of the minimum pension (Minimum Vieillesse) from 1 January 2006. Existing recipients of the minimum pension are not automatically transferred to the ASPA, but may do so on request.

In its 2012 annual report, the Service d'Allocation de Solidarité aux Personnes Âgées (SASPA), managed by the Caisse des dépôts et consignations, counted 70,827 recipients of the ASPA on 31 December 2012 (against 71,490 in 2011).

== Eligibility ==
To qualify for ASPA, the recipient must live in France or French territory, and meet age and financial need criteria.

=== Lawful residence in France ===
A French citizen must have their main residence on French territory. The allowance is suspended if the recipient moves to another country. A foreign national must also meet at least one of these conditions:

- Have held for at least 10 years a residence permit allowing them to work;
- Have refugee status;
- Be stateless;
- Be eligible for protection subsidiaire (subsidiary protection, protection granted to persons who are not classed as refugees, but who still face specific threats in their own country);
- Have fought for France;
- Be a national of a member state of the European Economic Area or of Switzerland.

=== Minimum age ===
The recipient must be at least 65 years old, except in three special cases for which the criterion is reduced to the minimum legal age of retirement [5] :

- Be disabled by at least 50% and be recognized as permanently unfit for work;
- Be retired from work on the grounds of disability;
- Be a veteran or a prisoner of war.

=== Financial need ===
Assets taken into account include all earnings and property, pensions and disability and the disabled adult allowance (AAH). Family benefits, the allocation of social housing, and military pensions are not taken into account [6] . The annual income limit is adjusted on 1 April each year. [8] .

In 2020, the annual income limit is €10838.40 for a single person, and €16826.64 for a couple.

== Value ==
The ASPA provides an income up to the annual income limit (currently €9,503.89 for a single person, and €14,755.32 for a couple), taking into account the above assets. ASPA will be upgraded in 2014 as part of French pension reforms. The single person's annual income limit is expected to be increased to €9,600 in October 2014.

The ASPA is transferable and seizable in settlement of debts.

== Recovery ==
ASPA is conceived of as an advance from the State rather than a grant, and payments can be reclaimed by the State after the person's death if their estate is worth more than €39,000. Reclaimed payments will not reduce the value of the estate to less than this amount. To prevent the recipient artificially reducing the value of their estate by making gifts or taking out life insurance, for example, these payments are included in the calculation of net assets.

== See also ==
- Social Security in France
- Pensions in France
