= Agreements on objectives =

The agreement on objectives is an agreement concerning the goals to be achieved by the employee. It is a motivational technique and standardly used in field service and in project work, but also in other areas. Besides trade and industry, it is also increasingly used in public administration.

== Origins of the instrument ==
An Agreement on objectives is an instrument of leadership, that goes back to the teaching of Management by objectives. Management by objectives in this context means the keeping of employees by objectives. The company's philosophy gives the impetus for the formulation of strategic objectives, which in turn are translating the employee goals into operational goals. The objectives of the top level of the hierarchy are the longer-term orientation and aligning goals of a company. The lower the targets are located in the hierarchy, the more short-term and specific they are. To note here is that each target species based on the overriding objective must be to ensure the company acts as a purposeful whole.

== Inclusion in the compensation system ==
Target agreements are an instrument of modern personnel management, in the form of a performance-based, variable compensation classified as an ongoing fee.

== Legal definition ==
An agreement between employers and employee, where periodic objectives, related to the individual employee, are agreed with the compensation depending on the degree of goal attainment.

== Business definition ==
Economically, the arrangements are agreed on a target, up to a certain point in time, to be performed, which in practice are usually taken in the context of appraisal interviews.

== Boundaries ==
=== Targets ===
Target agreements are agreed between two parties, however, targets are determined unilaterally by the employer as part of its management rights.

=== Commission ===
Both commission and agreement on objectives contain a variable performance pay, which will be paid in addition to a fixed salary. As an individual performance-related compensation from the commission ruled, however, for employees who do not or are not used primarily in sales, or in which any case is not primarily a revenue-or profit-related performance, are provided. If the employer takes a target, from whose achievement is only the commission paid, it's a question of an agreement on objectives.

=== Bonus ===
With the agreement of a bonus, employees are involved with a certain percentage share of the economic success of the company. It is a success fee, which is independent of the contribution of the employee's to the company's success. In contrast, target agreements must set the goals to be reached and influenced by the employee for his assistance. Still occurs at the end of the fiscal year to assess the performance of the employee will be decided by which, whether the objectives have been met or not. If it is solely on the sales performance of the company, which is not much influenced by the employee, it is a bonus.

== Aims of the agreement by objectives system ==
Basically, to be brought into line with agreed targets, the individual goals of employees with corporate goals, thereby increasing efficiency of the company takes place. Agreements on objectives can orient themselves to the performance of the individual employee or a group (individual objective) and the success of the company (corporate goals). The employer can observe the implementation of continuous feedback in the target agreement process, continuing to the performance level of the individual worker and influence through ongoing training. It is therefore the appraisal of an employee, which is also of enormous importance in the area of staff development. Agreements on objectives allow the company to continue flexible working and provide an additional incentive compensation for the extra performance of the employee. The employee is given the opportunity, however, to earn an additional payment, for example in the form of an annual premium.

== The goal setting process ==
The goal setting process is usually very complex and vary from company to company in practice. This can be derived the following key points:

=== Vertex 1 ===
Agreements on objectives are arranged once a year, usually taken at the beginning of the business year. Clearly defined goals have to be formulated and agreed. The whole goal setting process requires that the employees understand the objectives and accept them. In general, for reasons of clarity and feasibility, no more than six goals are agreed. Often three to five business-related field goals are connected to a personal development goal (soft aim). S.M.A.R.T. goals should continue to be formulated. They should be:

Specific = Detailed description of the desired state (and easily understandable)

Measurable = Specification of criteria by which success can be verified (qualitative, quantitative)

Attractive = Active influenced and accessible. The goals take place in the area of responsibility of the employee and are not in elementary dependence on external, non-configurable criteria.

Relevant = Realistic in terms of corporate goals

Terminated = Specifying the target date of achieving completes the objective conditions.

=== Vertex 2 ===
During the second or third quarter, often a milestone meeting is held, at which a short feedback is given about the current level of achievement.

=== Vertex 3 ===
At the end of the agreed period the target outcome conversation occurs, in which the achievement of goals, set by an actual-theoretical comparison, is found.

=== Vertex 4 ===
The final goal statement takes place in the first quarter after the expiration of the agreed target period.

=== Vertex 5 ===
For the target assessment, various methods may be used. An effective tool is the balanced scorecard. Important in achieving objectives control is that it is transparent to the employee and is perceived as fair.

== Opportunities and risks of agreed targets for the company ==
For the company, setting agreements on objectives results in time savings in the business process. Agreeing on overall and partial objectives avoids duplication and helps to coordinate the processes and tasks. Furthermore, the tuning of daily business processes can be shortened by clear rules and priorities of the latitude of the employees.

The conversations respective agreements on objectives cause an agreement that inform the employee about the reasons and backgrounds, as well as the conditions of the work task and thus counteract problems independently and purposefully. The control times of the executives are shortened. Furthermore, employees are encouraged to feel more accountable for the results of their activities. Agreements on objectives are increasing the employee's identification with the work content and the company, which also leads to improved performance of the employee and thereby increase the efficiency of the company.

The employee evaluation is simplified by the well-defined goals, which also helps the employer in the dismissal process to property, because the average performance is defined or agreed upon with the employee. The termination scale can therefore be exacerbated to the detriment of the employee. Furthermore, the personnel control is relieved by agreeing on precisely defined targets.

Risks posed by the possible development of an enhanced range: Selfishness. The personal interest is often put before the general interest, so that individual employees, able to assist the group, agree to meet targets.

The increased potential for conflict in the evaluation of target achievement, in particular where the goals are unclear and complicated billing comes through the complex design of the target agreement system is reflected in the contra-side for the company.

== Opportunities and risks for employees ==
For the employees agreements on objectives result in a clear orientation on corporate goals and their own work area and a clear orientation what kind of contribution or achievement is expected from the company. Thereby the staff is actively involved with the company's goal setting. Also, the scope for creativity and autonomy is extended to the employee.

The assessment criteria for goal achievement is more transparent and personal development goals for the employee are taken seriously within the company. The feedback from the supervisor informs the employee about his strengths and weaknesses of a reasonable basis. As part of goal setting discussions, employees can express concerns and desires and provide feedback to the supervisor. The employees get a sense of their objectives, by agreement of partnership, which in turn affects the work environment positively. Furthermore, the employee has the chance of an above-average earning.

A disadvantage for the employee is the risk of losing the bonus of the agreement by objectives, if he fails to reach the goal.

The introduction and sustained implementation of a target agreement system is connected with high expenses. Framework aims have to be defined, a comprehensive company-specific approach has to be developed. Employees must be informed and involved. Even managers and the council may need to be informed and involved in the process. Moreover, the managers have to be trained in terms of their new responsibilities. It therefore requires not only a lot of capital, but also enormous time resources to establish a target agreement system and sustainable.

The introduction of a system like agreements on objectives might only be worthwhile if the expense is offset by the significant increase in performance of employees.
