= Fundamental principles recognized by the laws of the Republic =

In France, the fundamental principles recognized by the laws of the Republic (French: principes fondamentaux reconnus par les lois de la République, abbreviated to PFRLR) are certain principles recognized by the Constitutional Council and the Council of State as having constitutional force.

This concept is mentioned briefly in the preamble of the Constitution of 1946. The preamble of the constitution of 1958 references the 1946 preamble, and the constitutional judges, in their "freedom of association" ruling, decision n°71-44 DC of 16 July 1971, gave constitutional force to this preamble. (Note: These fundamental principles are thus principles included in the constitutional block (France) (French: Bloc de constitutionnalité): various translations are seen, as no established term exists yet in English for this term, including constitutionality corpus (sometimes Constitutionality Corpus), corpus of constitutionality, constitutionality block, block of constitutionality, constitutional framework, and others.)

== Initial appearance ==
Fundamental principles were mentioned in a budget law of 31 March 1931 (article 91) to characterize freedom of instruction. This was adopted as a compromise by deputies from the Popular Republican Movement (MRP) when writing the Constitution of the Fourth Republic, since the SFIO (socialist) and PCF (communist) deputies had declared themselves hostile to a constitutionalization of this freedom along with the other rights cited in the preamble.

The principles attached to this notion were defined by the judge. First, the Council of State identified freedom of association as a fundamental principle, initially basing it on a 1956 appellate decision, (Note: The July 11, 1956 decision of the French Council of State established freedom of association for individuals. The decision is known as the Arrêt Amicale des Annamites de Paris.) and then, from 1971 on the Constitutional Council's Decision #71-44 DC on freedom of association as well.

Today, the fundamental principles designate in the modern spirit the landmark laws of the first, second, and third republics, notably freedom of conscience and freedom of association.

== Constitutionalization of principles ==
The extensive constitutional body of law developed by the Constitutional Council since 1971 has given constitutional force to some principles by making them fundamental principles recognized by the laws of the Republic (PFRLR). These essential principles of French law, created by the legislature but not specified in the constitution or raised as a constitutional norm, such as the principle of independence of administrative jurisdiction or freedom of association, were then imposed on the legislature and administration.

PFRLRs are mainly defined by constitutional judges, even though their first mention was by the Council of State. Constitutional judges consider themselves not creators but interpreters of these principles, to avoid concerns of “government by the judges”.

== Applicability criteria ==
The Constitutional Council verified four criteria before recognizing the PFRLR. Thus, a principle must come from:

- A legislative text of a general scope stating the principle from before 1946 (instauration of the Fourth Republic)
- A republican regime (thus excluding legislation from the monarchical and Vichy regimes), even if an exception exists in the PFRLR identified in the decision of 23 January 1987 “Competitiveness council”, relying partly on the law of 16 and 24 August 1790 adopted by the National Constituent Assembly and sanctioned by Louis XVI
- Continuous application; there can be no exception allowed.
- A general (not contingent) legal principle. This condition explains why the Jus soli is not identified as a PFRLR, since the law of 1889 giving it an absolute character (confirmed by a law of 1927) was not affirming a principle but was linked to the circumstances of the time, here the establishment of conscription (Constitutional Council, Decision n°93-321 DC of 20 July 1993). As such, PFRLRs are not comparable to traditions, customs, or simple habits of positive law.
- The principle must have “sufficient importance” Decision no. 98-407 DC of 14 January 1999, Act determining the mode of election of regional councillors, wrote “Considering that, in any event, the invoked rule does not have a sufficient importance to be regarded as a 'fundamental principle recognized by the laws of the Republic' mentioned in the first paragraph of the Preamble of the Constitution of 1946, thus the complaint must be rejected”.

Since 2013 and Decision no. 2013-669 DC of 17 May 2013 “Law providing for same-sex marriage”, three new conditions have been identified. On this occasion, the Council ruled that the opposite-sex character of marriage was not a PFRLR.

The principles must pertain to at least one of the following topics:

- Separation of powers
- National sovereignty
- Fundamental rights and freedoms

== List of principles ==
As of April 2022, the Constitutional Council has identified eleven principles as PFRLR:

- Freedom of association
- Rights of defense in a trial
- Individual liberty
- Freedom of instruction and notably academic freedom
- Freedom of conscience
- Independence of administrative jurisdiction
- Independence of university professors and lecturers
- Exclusiveness of administrative jurisdiction for the cancelling or reform of decisions taken in the exercise of prerogatives of public powers
- Judicial authority guardian of private property
- Existence of criminal justice for minors
- Use of local laws in Alsace and Moselle “as long as they have not been replaced with common laws or harmonized with them”

Furthermore, the Council of State in 1996 identified the prohibition of political extradition.

The PFRLRs are to be distinguished from other principles identified by the Constitutional Council:

- Principles of constitutional status which are general principles of French law having the effect of constitutional text
- The objectives of constitutional value

== See also ==
- Fundamental freedoms
- Constitution of the Fifth Republic
- Judiciary of France
- General principles of French law
