= Social security in France =

Social security
- Sécurité sociale

Agency overview
- Formed: October 19, 1945
- Jurisdiction: Government of France
- Motto: De chacun selon ses moyens, à chacun selon ses besoins (English: From each according to his ability, to each according to his needs)
- Employees: 150,000
- Annual budget: 470€ billion EUR (2018)
- Agency executive: Pierre Pribile, director (since April 2024)
- Parent department: Minister of Health
- Website: www.securite-sociale.fr

Social security (French: sécurité sociale, pronounced [sekyʁite sɔsjal]) is divided by the French government into five branches: illness; old age/retirement; family; work accident; and occupational disease. From an institutional point of view, French social security is made up of diverse organismes. The system is divided into three main Regimes: the General Regime, the Farm Regime, and the Self-employed Regime. In addition there are numerous special regimes dating from prior to the creation of the state system in the mid-to-late 1940s.

The main concept is that a unique and central institution will pay for all medical costs and pensions so as to provide an equal level of coverage to the whole population. All incomes are taxed to fund this system. The main advantage is that its negotiating power lowers very significantly the price of medicine and the system covers systematically all expenses without limit (100% coverage for any long term or critical problem such as diabetes or cancer). The main drawback being the significant cost (albeit lower than that in the US).

In 2018, Social security paid out €470 billion in social benefits, equivalent to 20% of France's GDP of €2,353 billion. Its main expenditure is on benefits for the sickness branch of the general scheme (€198.3 billion) and benefits for the old-age branch of the general scheme (€126.3 billion). Social security benefit fraud is relatively low (€2.3 billion), lower than social security contribution fraud by companies (€6.8 to €8.4 billion), and much lower than tax fraud (€80 to €100 billion).

== History of social protection ==
From the Middle Ages, certain professional organizations provided limited assistance to their members. However, the abolition of corporations by the Allarde decree, in 1791, put an end to this early system of private professional collective security. It was nevertheless replaced by the sociétés de secours mutuels, or societies for mutual support, recognized and strictly regulated by the 1835 Humann law. These sociétés would thereafter be free from administrative control, and were encouraged by the law of 1 April 1898, referred to as the Charte de la mutualité, or Charter of mutuality. The 1898 law establishes the principles of mutualisme, as they are found today in French law; mutuelles, organizations for collective social insurance, were permitted to offer loans to any French person even if at the beginning, interest rates were too high for the average person.

Alongside the movement for mutual, private social insurance, legislators pushed state-sponsored social aid, which tended to nurture the principle of national solidarity. The law of 15 July 1893, instituted free medical assistance; the law of 9 April 1898, considerably facilitated the worker compensation claims; the law of 27 June 1904, created the service départemental d'aide sociale à l'enfance, a childbirth assistance program; and on 14 July 1905, an elderly and disabled persons assistance program was initiated. France also had, by the 1900s, the most extensive network of child welfare clinics and free or subsidized milk supplies in the world.

A building of the Sécurité sociale in Rennes

The development of insurance companies, at the beginning of the 20th century, was also encouraged by legislation. (Note that insurance companies are profit driven, and mutuelles are cooperatives.) On 9 April 1898, legislators required that employers purchase insurance for indemnity payments to injured employees. Then, on 5 April 1928, insurance was extended to cover illness, maternity, and death. On 30 April 1930, the law was again extended to apply to jobs in the agricultural sector, which incited spirted opposition. The bill was supported by Pierre Laval, who went on to serve as the French Prime Minister from 1942 to 1944, in the Vichy government. As a result, the French historian Fred Kupferman has called Laval "the father of social security" in France.

During the Second World War, the National Council of the French Resistance adopted plans to create a universal social security program to cover all citizens, regardless of class, in the event that sickness or injury made them unable to work. In the UK, the first report of the British economist William Beveridge outlined the general principles that would govern the integration and evolution of social security in post-war France. Indeed, the ordonnances of 4 and 19 April 1945, created a generalized, national social security system similar to that described in Beveridge's plan.

=== Modern history ===
The Social Security is financed by payments from both employers and their employees and is administered and managed by all social partners, typically employee unions and/or companies.

The Constitution of the Fourth Republic, adopted by referendum in 1946, created a constitutional state obligation to provide financial assistance to those deemed most socially vulnerable, most notably women, children, and retired workers.

Nonetheless, social security was not entirely universal. The program of the National Resistance Council had envisioned universal social security, but the régime général, or unified social security program, actually created excluded miners, sailors, farmers, and government employees, all of whom were covered by régimes particuliers, or special administrative bodies. Finally, the law of 22 May 1946, limited coverage under the unified social security program to employees of the industrial and commercial sectors.

In the following decades, the unified social security program would gradually be extended by various laws:

- 9 April 1947 : extended social security to government workers
- 17 January 1948 : established three retiree insurance programs for non-salaried, non-farm employees (artisans, industrial and commercial workers, and among the liberal professions)
- 10 July 1952 : established mandatory retiree insurance program for farmers, managed by the mutualité sociale agricole (MSA)
- 25 January 1961 : established mandatory health insurance for farmers, allowing them choice among providers.
- 12 July 1966 : established maternity health insurance for non-salaried, non-farm workers, managed by the CANAM
- 22 December 1966 : established mandatory insurance programs for farm-related accidents, non-work related accidents, and work-related sicknesses with free-choice of provider.
- 25 October 1972 : enforced protection of salaried farm-workers against work-related accidents written into law
- 4 July 1975 : universalized retiree insurance to be mandatory for the working population
- 22 January 1978 : establishment of unique program for ministers, religious congregation members, and personal insurance other non-covered persons
- 1997 : created the « vital card », the certificate of affiliation to social security that is issued to each insured person at the age of 16
- 28 July 1999 : institutialized universal health care.
- 2017 : generalized third-party payment (dispensation of advance fees) to all policyholders. (Decided in 2015)
- 2021 : created the fifth branch, dedicated to the autonomy of the elderly and disabled.

== Allowances by branch ==
=== Disease ===
The sickness insurance covers the cost of general medicine and special care and dentures, Pharmaceutical expenses and equipment, analysis and laboratory tests; hospitalization and treatment heavy care facilities, rehabilitation, prenuptial examination vaccinations, tests done in public health programs, and the accommodation and treatment of children or adolescents with disabilities. In case of sickness, health insurance provides daily allowances to the insured who is in physical disability and unable to continue or resume work. The daily allowance depends on the daily earning and on the number of dependent children. Health insurance also manages maternity (expenses for examinations and daily allowance during maternity leave), disability (pension granted when the person is unable to work), and deaths.

In order to be taken in charge by health insurance, care and products must meet two conditions: being provided by a public or private practitioner duly authorized to exercise and being included on the list of reimbursable drugs and products. Health insurance operate on the basis of tariffs set by convention or authority. Health insurance does not support all the expenses within the rates used to calculate benefits. In principle, the insured is required to advance the expenses, and social security then reimburses the insured. However, there are some conventions of "third-party payer" providing direct payment for the body to the service.

Health insurance depends on the professional past or present of a person. However, for those not fulfilling the conditions of membership on a professional basis but residing in France for at least three months in a regular situation, there is universal coverage. The insured entitlement to benefits in kind of health insurance and maternity his spouse or partner when it does not have a system of social protection, dependent children and any person taken in charge by the insured and who does not benefit from a system of social protection.

==== Universal health coverage ====
Since 2000, a universal health coverage has been in place, providing two fundamental rights for access to care: a right to health insurance for anyone in stable and regular residence in the territory and a right for the most disadvantaged, submitted to resources, to a free coverage, with exemption from fee.

The first component, for basic coverage, improves access to care for people suffering from extreme exclusion, but also many people temporarily or permanently deprived of the right to health insurance. It also introduced the principle of continuity of rights: a caisse can stop paying benefits only if another caisse takes over or if the insured person leaves the country.

The second component, the creation of an additional free coverage on the behalf of national solidarity, is included in the management of care by health insurance. This reform affects 10% of the most disadvantaged people meeting the criteria of resources and residence.

=== Accidents at work ===
The accident insurance and occupational diseases is a branch of social security often managed by the same agencies that the health branch. It is the oldest branch of social security. The legislation go back to 1898 and were included in the 31 December 1946 law creating the Social Security.

There are three social accidents for which the risk is better covered than by the accident assurance health insurance. The accident at work is the accident, whatever the cause, occurring because of or in connection with a job, to any person employed by one or more employers or entrepreneurs. Travel accident is an accident occurring on a route between work and home or during a mission on behalf of the employer. A professional disease is a disease of occupational origin and included in a list indicating any occupational diseases, their causes and the duration of incubation.

In the cases of industrial accident, travel from home, or occupational disease, medical care and vocational rehabilitation are totally taken in charge by social security. In case of permanent reduction of working capacity, the victim is entitled a capital (if the rate of permanent disability is less than 10%), and an annuity (if the rate is more than 10%). In case of the death of the insured, the beneficiaries (spouse, children and descendants dependents) receive a pension.

=== Family ===
A Caisse d'allocations familiales (‘Caf’ or ‘CAF’, and in English: Family Allocations Office) is a private-sector body with departmental responsibility for paying family and social benefits to individuals (statutory benefits) under conditions laid down by law.

Family benefits consist of:

- The family allowances granted from the second dependent child, a fixed amount per child from the third
- The Family Complement assigned to the household or the person whose resources do not exceed a ceiling
- The adopted child allowance attributed to parents adopting children since 2004. The PAJE replaced five previously existing benefits
- The special education allowance (AES) awarded to any person who is caring for a disabled child until its 20th birthday
- The maintenance allowance granted to the surviving spouse or parent or family home to raise an orphaned child
- The school allocation of available to children under 18 who continue their studies or placed under apprenticeship provided that their income does not exceed 55% of SMIC,
- The lone parent allowance granted in case of insufficient resources to persons bearing the burden alone of at least one child
- The housing family allowance granted in case of housing insalubrity
- The allocation of social housing in case of housing insalubrity to the elderly, the disabled, some unemployed and beneficiaries of the RSA.

Family benefits are granted to any French or foreign person residing in France with a dependent child or children living in France under 20 (or 21 years for housing allowances to family).

=== Old age ===
Average effective age of retirement for men, 1970 to 2018. France has one of the lowest effective retirement ages in Europe.

All the schemes of basic and supplementary pensions in France work on the method of distribution. The schemes redistribute every year, in the form of pensions paid to retirees, contributions received that year from the assets. If the rules of the various pension plans in France correspond to different concepts, they are based on common principles. All schemes incorporate mechanisms of solidarity: solidarity between generations (principle of distribution) and solidarity within a single generation (large redistributions between different occupational groups and gender). These principles of solidarity occurs both in the regimes, between the regimes and beyond regimes at the national level. There are transfers between the schemes, and therefore solidarity between the basic schemes, as well as mechanisms for schemes coordination. Solidarity at the national level consists of the minimum old-age pension assigned to all seniors who have limited resources, paid by the solidarity fund retirement (which also pay some family benefits), but also of state subsidies granted to certain regimes (farmers, SNCF, RATP, mining, marine, etc.), and finally of various taxes allocated to pensions. The retirement system in France is organized into three levels: a compulsory system, a scheme that is often mandatory, and optional arrangements.

==== Solidarity allowance for the elderly (ASPA) ====
The Allocation de Solidarité aux Personnes Agées (solidarity allowance for the elderly) (ASPA) is a French state pension for elderly people, whether or not they are former employees, on low incomes. It replaced the multiple components of the minimum pension (Minimum Vieillesse) from 1 January 2006. To qualify for ASPA, the recipient must live in France and meet age and financial need criteria.

== Funding ==
=== Contributions ===
The system of social security is financed largely by contributions based on the wages of employees. However, new funding policies have sought to broaden the base by taking into account all the household income, and policies to promote employment led to lighten the burden of contributions on low wages.

The income of social security schemes are traditionally divided along the following categories:

- The "actual contributions" (57% of total revenue) represent the contributions paid by the insured and employers to social security.
- The "fictitious contributions" (8% of revenue) correspond in schemes employers (SNCF, RATP, EDF, ...) in funding by the employer of the scheme it manages. Indeed, the employer must ensure the balance of the scheme.
- The "public contributions" (3% of revenue) represent direct payments to the state, including grants to individual special regimes balance
- The "assigned taxes" (19% of revenue) include various contributions and taxes used to finance social security. The most important is the general social contribution (CSG), based on all household incomes and contributing to the financing of health insurance, family benefits and Retirement Solidarity Fund.

== Budget ==
Balance of the General Social Security scheme in billions of euros from 1998 to 2017

The budget of the social security system is separate from the budget of the state and is subject to a separate vote and an act of parliament (Loi de finances de la sécurité sociale). The 2010 budget amounted to 428 Bn €.

	Spending	Resources	Balance
Health	153,4	141,8	-11,6
Pensions	102,3	93,4	-8,9
Family	52,9	50,2	-2,7
Workplace accidents	11,2	10,5	-0,7
Total (General regime)	311,5	287,5	-23,9
Total (All systems)	427,5	402,0	-25,5

Although the social security system achieved surplus between 1999 and 2001 thanks to the late 1990s economic recovery, it has since been repeatedly achieved important deficits, especially in 2009-2011 in the aftermath of the Great Recession. The 2013 budget was forecast to reach 469 billion € and a deficit of 12.6 billion €. Marisol Touraine, Minister of Social Affairs and Health, announced in September 2016 that the social security budget would be balanced in 2017 for the first time in 16 years.

== Special regimes ==
In addition to the three main regimes there are numerous special regimes dating from prior to the creation of the state system which refused to be merged into the general system when it was created. The main special regimes are:

- National Social security fund for the military (Caisse nationale militaire de sécurité sociale)
- Railway workers fund (Caisse de la SNCF)
- Mineworkers Social security fund (régime minier de sécurité sociale)
- Fund of the independent Paris transportation system (régime spécial de la RATP)
- Fund for gas and electricity workers (régime des industries électriques et gazières)
- National Institute for Navy (Établissement national des invalides de la marine)
- Social security system for solicitors and lawyers (régime des clercs et employés de notaires)
- Social Security system of the Bank of France (régime de la Banque de France)
- Social security system of the Paris Chamber of Commerce (régime de la Chambre de commerce et d’industrie de Paris)
- Social security system of the Senate of France (régime du Sénat)
- Social security system of the National Assembly of France (régime de l'Assemblée nationale),
- Social security system of the port of Bordeaux (régime du port autonome de Bordeaux)
- Fund for non-resident French nationals (Caisse des français de l'étranger)

== See also ==
- Agessa
- French hospitals
- Health care in France
- Établissement national des invalides de la marine

== Sources ==
On the funding of Social Security

- National Assembly report
- Senate report
- The account of Social Security
- Project for the financement of Social Security in 2009
- Report by the Cour des Comptes
