= Hospitals in France =

Health care in France

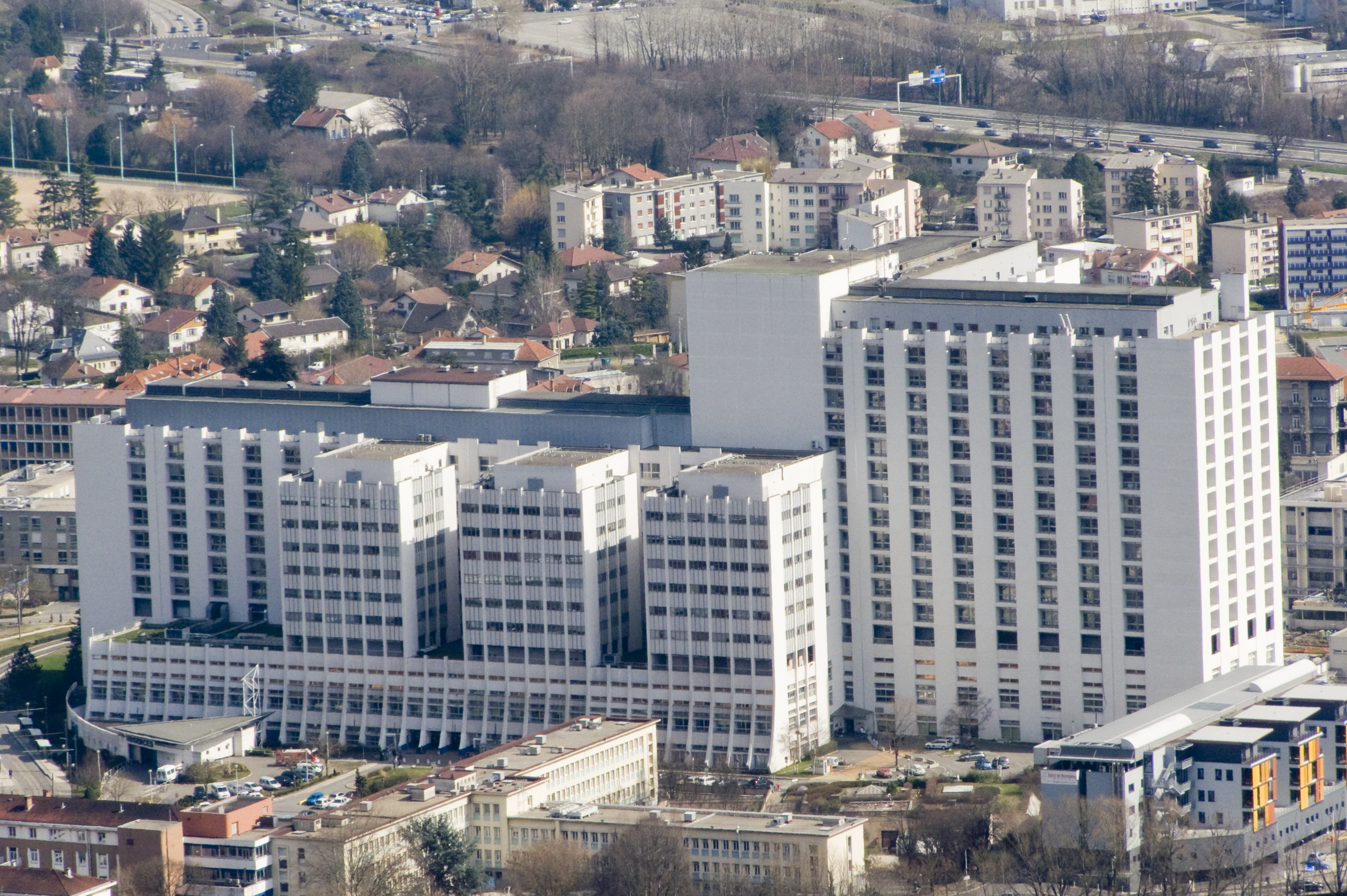
Centre Hospitalier Universitaire Grenoble Alpes

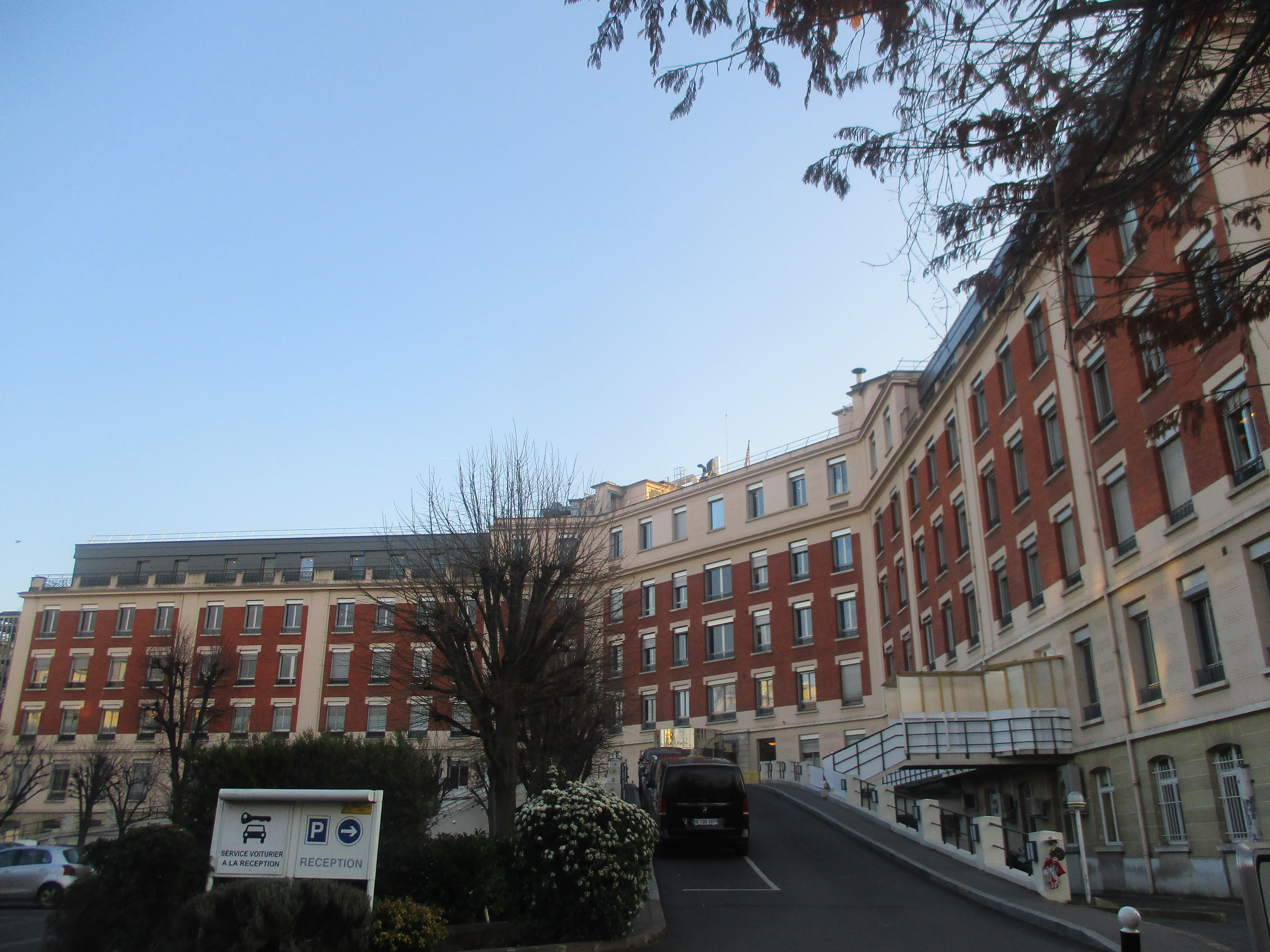
American Hospital of Paris - Private hospital - Neuilly sur Seine

French hospitals are places designed to care for patients suffering from illnesses and traumas too complex to be treated at home or in a doctor's office.

In France, as part of a public service mission, hospitals can carry out complementary missions, notably in the fields of prevention, professional training, and research.

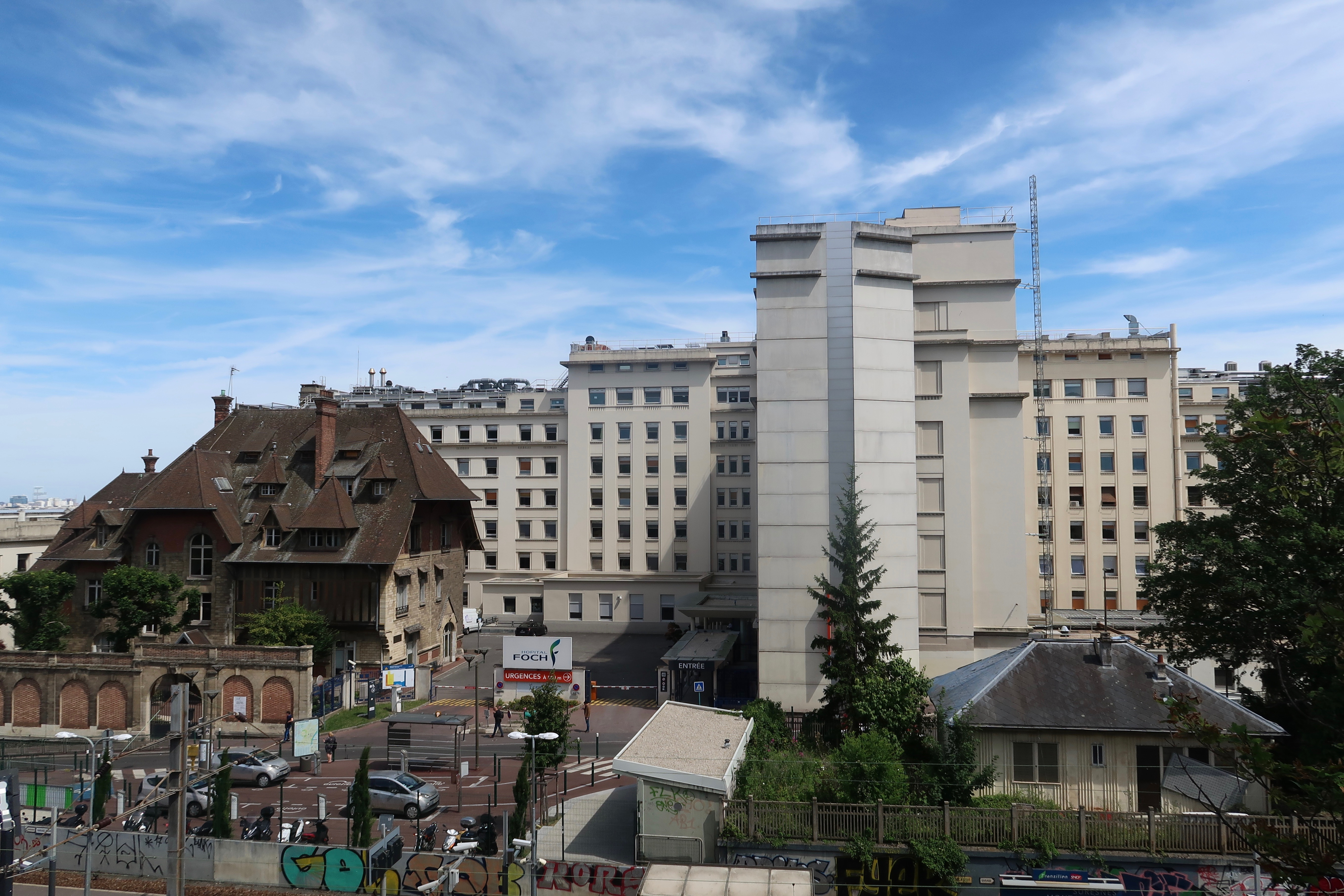
Foch Hospital - ESPIC Privé - Suresnes

== Status of French hospitals ==
The French hospital system comprises both public and private healthcare establishments. The Public Health Code distinguishes between three types of establishment:

1. Public health establishments: These are state-run hospitals operated as public entities;
2. Private for-profit hospitals: These are commercial enterprises where physicians typically work as self-employed professionals;
3. Private non-profit hospitals: Managed by associations governed by the 1901 law, mutual insurance organizations, or foundations, these institutions pursue healthcare missions without a profit motive.

=== Types of public hospitals ===
With the exception of military hospitals (Hôpitaux d'instruction des armées, HIA), public hospitals are constituted as public health establishments. There are several categories:

1. Regional Hospital Centers (Centres Hospitliers Régionaux, CHR): these establishments are highly specialized in various fields of medicine and surgery, and are equipped with extensive technical facilities. A CHR is generally also a teaching hospital (Centre Hospitalier Universitaire, CHU): this is a facility that has signed an agreement with a medical university to provide practical teaching for medical students in several medical disciplines.
2. National Hospitals Centers (Centres Hospitaliers Nationaux, CHN): there are two of these: the Quinze-Vingts National Ophthalmology Hospital and the Fresnes National Public Health Establishment (dedicated to prisoners).
3. Hospital Centers (Centres Hospitaliers, CH): providing a full range of medical, surgical and obstetric (médecine, chirurgie ou obstétrique, MCO) services.
4. Local Hospitals (Hôpitaux Locaux, HL): these establishments have a low level of medicalization. Care is usually provided by general practitioners in private practice. This category of establishment is no longer mentioned in the public health code.
5. Specialized Hospital Centers (Centres Hospitaliers Spécialisés, CHS): these specialized mental health establishments were set up by the law of June 30, 1838.

HIAs are establishments attached to the Ministry of the Armed Forces, and more specifically to the Armed Forces Health Service. They are primarily intended for military personnel injured in the line of duty but are open to all.

=== Distribution ===
Type of establishment	Entities	Beds	Outpatient beds
Public Sector	987	288 866	31 238
CHR and CHU	29	78 065	6 272
Hospital Centers (CH)	504	157 815	10 834
Specialized Hospital Centers (CHS)	87	28 954	13 927
Local Hospitals (HL)	347	22 239	54
Other public establishments	20	1 793	151
Private sector	1 869	154 901	19 480
Acute or multidisciplinary care facility	801	80 964	10 340
Cancer research centers	20	2 979	571
Establishment for the fight against mental illness	242	17 886	4 805
Follow-up care and rehabilitation facility	664	45 387	3 682
Long-term care facility	112	6 609	24
Other private establishments	30	1 076	58
TOTAL	2 856	443 767	50 718
Source: Le Panorama des établissements de santé 2007. Direction de la recherche, des études, de l'évaluation et des statistiques. Figures updated to December 31, 2005.

Type of establishment	Entities	Beds	Places ambulatoires
Public Sector	983	284 140	35 705
CHR and CHU	31	79 154	7 720
Hospital Centers (CH)	511	155 713	13 233
Specialized Hospital Centers (CHS)	90	28 019	14 369
Local Hospitals (HL)	334	19 610	220
Other public establishments	17	1 644	163
Private sector	1 801	156 287	22 824
Acute or multidisciplinary care facility	750	80 807	11 992
Cancer research centers	20	2 846	678
Establishment for the fight against mental illness	237	17 822	5 145
Follow-up care and rehabilitation facility	674	47 959	4 732
Long-term care facility	84	5 181	25
Other private establishments	36	1 672	252
TOTAL	2 784	440 427	58 529
Source: Le panorama des établissements de santé - édition 2010. Direction de la recherche, des études, de l'évaluation et des statistiques. Figures updated to December 31, 2008.

Type of establishment	Entities	Beds	Places ambulatoires
Public Sector	931	258 158	40 132
CHR and CHU	32	74 783	9 287
Hospital Centers (CH), including former local hospitals	789	153 456	15 847
Specialized Hospital Centers (CHS)	88	26 707	14 579
Other public establishments	22	3 212	419
Private non-profit sector	699	58 137	12 342
Cancer research centers	18	2 889	856
Other private non-profit establishments	681	55 248	11 486
Private for-profit sector	1 030	98 545	15 575
Acute or multidisciplinary care facility	542	59 458	12 133
Cancer research centers	20	2 846	678
Establishment for the fight against mental illness	140	11 735	1 037
Follow-up care and rehabilitation facility	324	25 999	2 308
Long-term care facility	12	508	24
Other private establishments	12	845	73
TOTAL	2 660	414 840	68 049
Source: Le panorama des établissements de santé - 2014 edition. Direction de la recherche, des études, de l'évaluation et des statistiques. Figures updated to December 31, 2012.

=== Activity ===
In 2006, nearly 8.4 million people were hospitalized in public health establishments, 260,000 more than in 2004. 3.5 million people were hospitalized in private for-profit hospitals and 1.2 million in private community hospitals. In 2008, there were 11.9 million full-time hospital admissions and 13.2 million admissions to partial hospitalization or day care.

== Hospital capacity ==
=== Bed capacity ===
In 2006, the total number of hospital beds was 451,652: 293,667 in the public sector (public health establishments), 94,571 in private for-profit hospitals, and 63,414 in private community hospitals.

Over the past few decades, the number of beds in the French hospital system has fallen steadily, from 612,898 in 1982 to 428,987 in 2013, a decline of 30%. During the same period, the French population grew from 55.7 million to 66 million, an increase of 18.5%; the number of hospital beds per capita therefore fell by just over 40%, from 11 beds per 1,000 inhabitants to 6.5. In 2023, the number of beds in the French hospital system will be 369,400, all types of establishment combined; with a population of 68,373,433 for the country as a whole, the number of hospital beds per 1,000 inhabitants is therefore 5.4.

The number of beds corresponds to the total number of beds in the French hospital system, both public and private. The French population is expressed here in tens of thousands of inhabitants.

In 2017, there were just under 400,000 full-time hospital beds, 69,000 fewer than in 2003, and even 100,000 fewer than in the previous 20 years. Conversely, in the follow-up care and rehabilitation sector (SSR), the number of beds rose from 92,000 in 2003 to 106,000 in 2017.

More precisely, the 3,046 public and private healthcare establishments had 399,865 beds in 2017. In twenty years, no less than one bed in five has thus been eliminated, the decline having been partly offset by the creation of "partial hospitalization" places in 2017, i.e. hospitalization for less than a day.

=== Number of beds and staff ===
The administrative opening of a bed in a hospital department requires a minimum number of staff, according to a legal framework:

Article D.6124-32 of the French Public Health Code states that, under the responsibility of a senior nurse, the paramedical team of an adult intensive care unit must include two nurses for every five patients, and one nurse's aide for every four intensive care beds. In reality, some beds may remain open without meeting these standards.

Article D.6124-34-5 specifies that in a specialized pediatric intensive care unit, the team comprises one nurse for every two patients. In the birthing sector, the number of paramedical staff may never be less than one nurse's aide or nursery assistant, present at all times (article D.6124-44 CSP). For each operation in the cardiac surgery department, two nurses, including one operating room nurse, are present in the room.

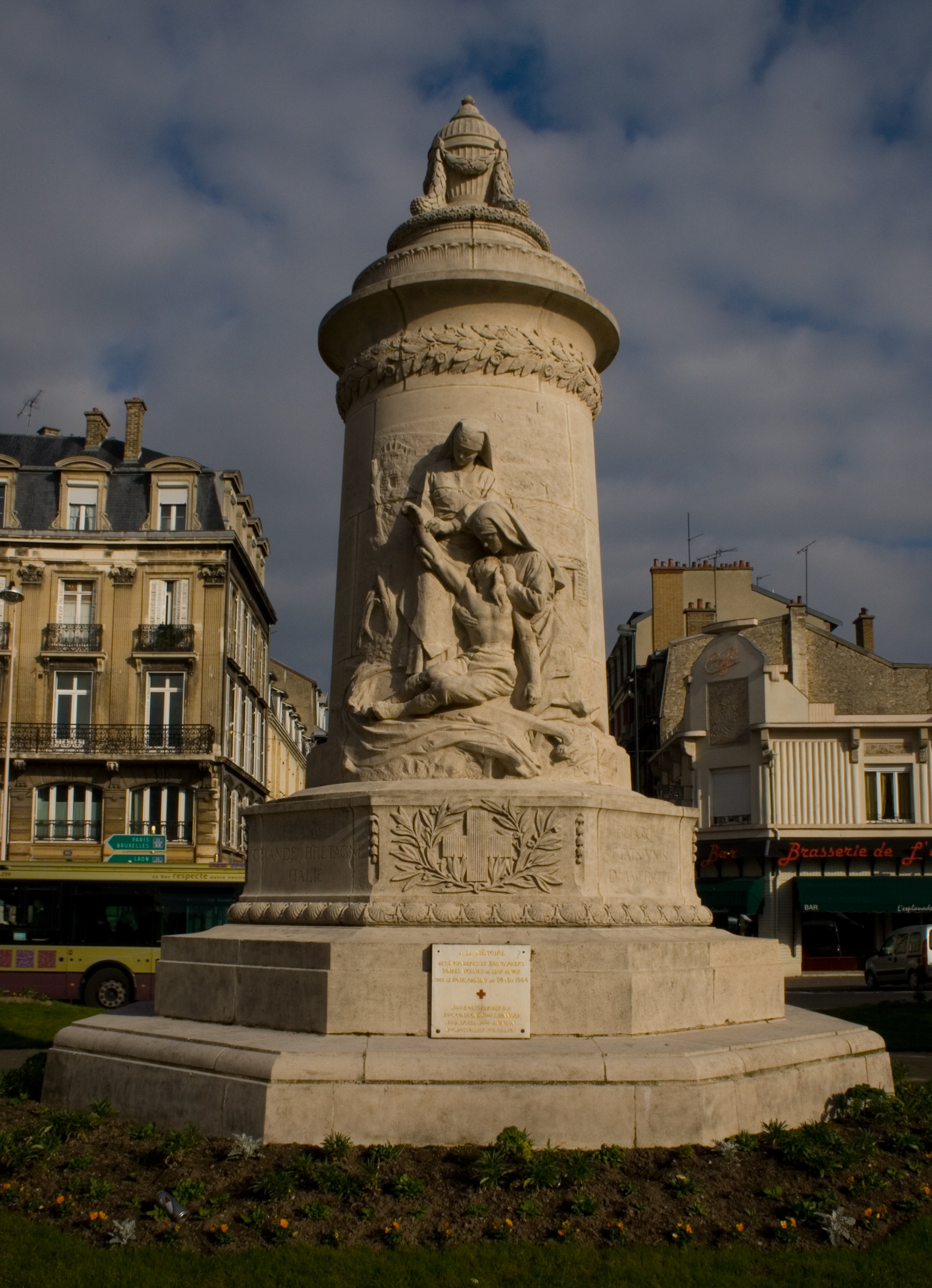
Monument to the nurses in Reims

== Staff ==
Hospital payroll accounts for 70% of total expenditure. This wage bill can therefore be used as a budgetary adjustment variable. Between 2003 and 2007, 5,200 new staff were hired. However, hospital unions have repeatedly denounced staff shortages.

Public hospitals employ a wide range of staff with different statuses depending on their function:

- Administrative and nursing staff are generally civil servants (agents de la fonction publique hospitalière);
- Medical staff are generally hospital civil servants under the authority of the C.N.G.;
- Civil servants, in particular hospital students and interns undergoing their initial training;
- Civil servants on secondment from other ministries, government departments, or agencies.

== Financing ==
=== Hospital spending ===
The French Social Security Financing Act (LFSS) for 2009 provided for €50.9 billion in spending on public and private hospitals, out of a total of €157.6 billion in healthcare expenditure. The budget for outpatient care in 2009 was 73.2 billion euros. This represented a 3.2% increase in the hospital budget. Ten years later, the projected 2019 budget for public hospitals was 82 billion euros, up 2 billion over 1 year thanks to the increase in activity-based pricing.

=== Public/private alignment ===
In return for identical services, public hospitals receive more from social security than private clinics. But public and private tariffs had to be aligned by 2018. This public/private tariff alignment represented 7 billion in annual savings for public hospitals. Public hospitals, led by the university hospitals, justified their higher rates by specific missions (emergencies, teaching, research, etc.). However, they received lump-sum allocations (Missions d’Intérêt Général et d’Aide à la Contractualisation, MIGAC; and Missions d’Enseignement, de Recherche, de Référence et d’Innovation, MERRI) to carry out these missions, the amounts of which were not justified by a precise cost analysis.

In 2011, the French federation of clinics (FHP-MCO) filed a complaint against France in Brussels for distortion of competition. In September 2011, the French Cour des Comptes recommended more methodical preparation for this deadline, which was enshrined in law but had already been postponed once.

== Safety and working conditions ==
Hospital staff are often confronted with violence. The Observatoire national des violences en milieu de soins (ONVS), an organization under the supervision of the Ministry, in its 2015 report noted a "worsening sense of insecurity felt by healthcare staff." This violence ranges from insults to physical assaults.

The ONVS counts an act of violence every 30 minutes in French hospitals, a total of 14,502 reports of attacks on people and property in 2014. Nurses are the first to be affected. Physical violence, which is proportionally the most frequent, is on the rise, with 5,119 reports.

In the years 2000-2010, community tension became a new element in violence, with emergency departments and maternity wards the most affected. There has been an increase in violence observed in certain obstetrics gynecology departments in the Paris region and several large cities. According to Le Monde, "fundamentalist husbands refuse to allow their wives to be examined, treated or delivered by a man. They vigorously demand it, even if it means endangering their wives and physically attacking the practitioner on duty".

In September 2013, after several serious incidents, the management of the Marseille Hospitals (Assistance publique - Hôpitaux de Marseille, AP-HM) was forced to take a series of "measures to guarantee staff safety".

== Hospital reforms ==
=== 1991 hospital reform ===
This law, prepared over a period of three years and championed by ministers Claude Évin and Bruno Durieux, strengthened hospital planning, making the health map dependent on a regional health organization plan (Schéma Régional d'Organisation Sanitaire, SROS), re-evaluated every five years. Establishments are required to produce projects.

=== 2003 hospital reform ===
Since January 1, 2003, the Hospital Plan 2007 has rapidly introduced a number of far-reaching changes to the way public hospitals operate:

- The creation of "hospital activity clusters".
- The introduction of a new budgetary system: the statement of projected income and expenditure (EPRD). Under the previous system, the execution of one year's budget was assessed the following year, allowing hospitals to exceed their allocated budget. By estimating and sanctioning any risk of overspending at an early stage, the EPRD makes financial logic prevail in hospital management. Henceforth, it is no longer their activity that determines the resources (and therefore expenditure) they need, but rather the revenue available to them, which determines their expenditure, their investments, and therefore their activity.
- The implementation of a new financing method: activity-based pricing or T2A. Until 2004, around three-quarters of the budget of public hospitals consisted of a lump-sum grant allocated by the Ministry of Health, irrespective of the volume, nature, and evolution of their activity. Under T2A (tarification à l'activité), hospitals are now financed on the basis of their actual activity. For each procedure, each practice, and each type of care, there is a corresponding tariff: public funding of hospitals now depends on the number of procedures performed and the tariffs charged for them. Tarification à l'activité (T2A) is a reform whose objectives were to put an end to the current financing of hospitals. Whatever their activity, evolution, dynamism or inertia, the overall allocation to hospitals tended to remain unchanged.

These major reforms have had a profound effect on the activity and internal organization of public hospitals. Their exceptional nature stems from the concomitance and brevity of their implementation period.

== Rankings ==
The magazines Le Point and Le Nouvel Observateur publish an annual honor roll of the best hospitals in France.

== Controversies ==
On November 5, 2008, the presidents of the medical advisory committees (commission médicale d’établissement, CCM) of the hospitals of the Greater Paris University Hospitals (Assistance publique - Hôpitaux de Paris, AP-HP) sent an open letter entitled Sauver l'hôpital public (Save the public hospital) to the French Minister of Health. In it, they denounced "budget cuts with no clearly identified medical or public health objectives" and "very short-term savings at any price", deeming that "quality" and "access to care for all" would "suffer" as a result of these spending cuts.

On July 7, 2021, the Notre hôpital c'est vous collective submitted a draft law on "universal access to a high-quality public hospital service" to the Constitutional Council in order to open a shared-initiative referendum on the text. This project, which aimed to achieve an increase in the number of beds and caregivers, was rejected on August 6.

== See also ==
- Lists of hospitals in the United States
- Medical emergency
