= Revenu minimum d'insertion =

The Revenu minimum d'insertion (RMI) was a French form of social welfare. It is aimed at people without any income who are of working age but do not have any other rights to unemployment benefits (such as contributions-based unemployment benefits). It was created in 1988 by Jean-Michel Belorgey, by the government of Michel Rocard (Socialist Party), and aimed at helping people who had the most problems with finding work.

The RMI has been fully replaced by the Revenu de solidarité active (RSA) in 2009, after a transition starting in 2007.

== Eligibility ==
Recipients must fulfill the following conditions:

- be older than 25 or have children;
- commit to finding work within 3 months of the first payment of benefit;
- live in France and, for non-EU nationals, have proof of having lived there for a minimum of five years;
- not be a pupil, student, or in work experience;
- not be married, in a civil union or a domestic partnership with someone who does not fulfill the conditions.

== Evolution ==
According to an INSEE 2001 study, a quarter of the RMI beneficents were either employed or in a remunerated internship. During the 21 months preceding the study, half of the beneficents passed through a period of employment, generally part-time, and a quarter only contrat à durée indéterminée (indeterminate length contract). The medium wage of the active people was of €610, after taxes.

In 1994, in Metropolitan France, the number of claimants of RMI was 783,436; ten years later (in June 2004), it had increased to 1,041,026. In the DOM, it was 105,033 in 1994, and 152,892 in June 2004. By 31 December 2005, the figure stood at 1,112,400. From December 2004 to December 2005, the number of RMI claimants increased by 4,7% according to Secours catholique NGO

In 2004, the government of Jean-Pierre Raffarin created the Revenu minimum d'activité (RMA), which is designed to replace the RMI. The RMA enforces the obligations for claimants to find work much more strictly.

== See also ==
- Guaranteed minimum income
- Poverty in France
