= Presidency of Emmanuel Macron =

French presidential administration since 2017

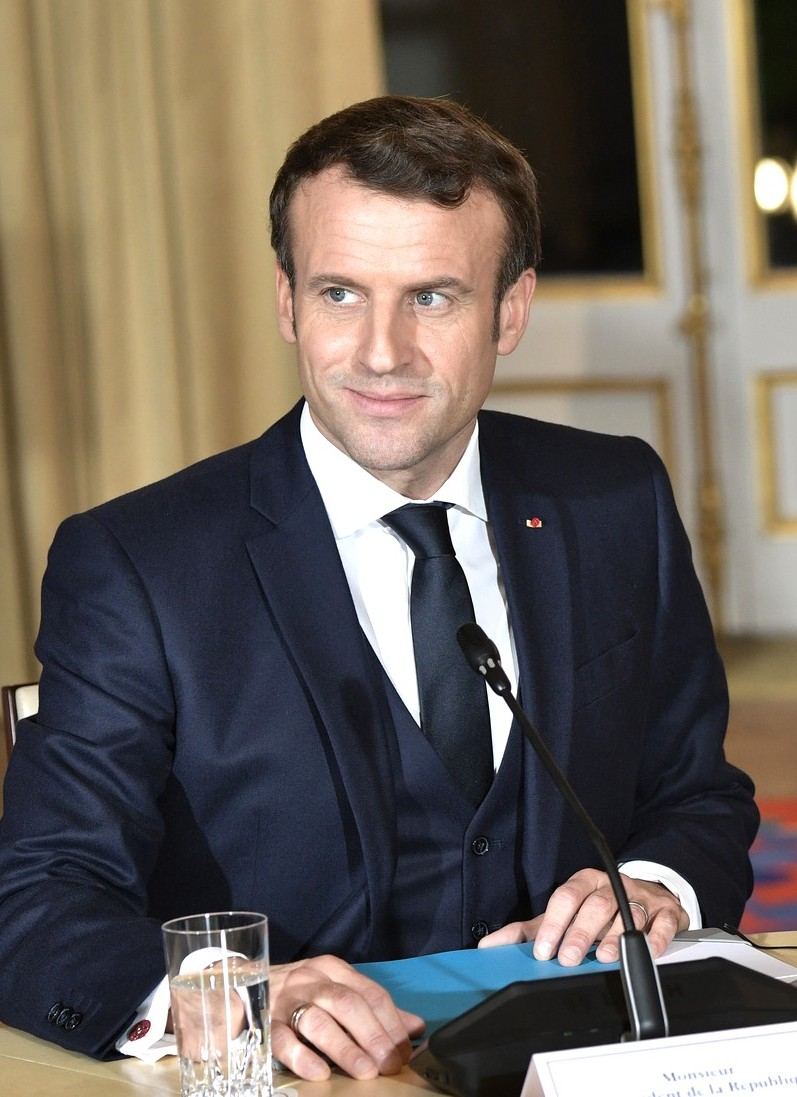
- Macron in 2019
- Presidency of Emmanuel Macron; 14 May 2017 – present
- President: Emmanuel Macron
- Party: Renaissance
- Election: 2017; 2022
- Seat: Élysée Palace
- Presidential standard of France

Emmanuel Macron's presidency began on 14 May 2017, when he took office after winning the 2017 French presidential election. At age 39, he was the youngest president in French history and the youngest French head of state since Napoleon. Macron was the founding member of Renaissance and was reelected in the 2022 French presidential election.

== Background ==
=== En Marche ! ===
Macron became known to the French public via his appearance on the French TV programme Des paroles et des actes in March 2015. Before forming En Marche !, Macron had hosted a series of events with him speaking in public, his first one in March 2015 in Val-de-Marne. Macron threatened to leave Manuel Valls' second government over a proposed reform on removing dual-nationality from terrorists. He took diplomatic trips, including one to Israel where he spoke on the advancement of digital technology.

Tensions around Macron's loyalty to the Valls government and François Hollande increased when they turned down "Macron 2", a bill he proposed that had a larger scope than the original Macron law. Macron was given the chance to insert his opinion into the El Khomri law and put specific parts of Macron 2 into the law although Myriam El Khomri was able to overturn these with the help of other ministers.

Amid tensions and deterioration of relations with the government, Macron founded an independent political party, En Marche !, in Amiens on 6 April 2016. It became a liberal, progressive political movement. The party and Macron were both reprimanded by President Hollande and the question of Macron's loyalty to the government was raised. Several MEPs spoke out in support of the party, although the majority of the Socialist Party spoke against En Marche ! including Valls, Michel Sapin, Axelle Lemaire and Christian Eckert.

In June 2016, support for Macron and his movement, En Marche !, began to grow in the media with Libération reporting that L'Express, Les Échos, Le 1, and L'Opinion had begun to voice public support for Macron. Following controversies surrounding trade unionists and their protests, major newspapers began to run stories about Macron and En Marche ! on their front page with mainly positive comments. Criticized by both the far-left and the far-right, these pro-Macron influencers in the press were dubbed "Macronites".

In May 2016, Orleans mayor Olivier Carré invited Macron to the festival commemorating the 587th anniversary of Joan of Arc's efforts during the Siege of Orléans. LCI reported that Macron was trying to recover the symbol of Joan of Arc from the far-right. Macron later went to Puy du Fou and declared he was "not a socialist" in a speech amid rumours he was going to leave the government.

=== Resignation ===
On 30 August 2016, Macron resigned from government ahead of the 2017 presidential election, to devote himself to En Marche !. Tensions had been rising amid several reports that he wanted to leave the government since early 2015. Macron initially planned to leave after the cancellation of his "Macron 2" law, but after a meeting with Hollande, he decided to stay and an announcement was planned to declare that Macron was committed to the government, later delayed due to the attacks in Nice and Normandy. Sapin replaced Macron. Speaking on Macron's resignation, Hollande said he had been "betrayed". According to an IFOP poll, 84% of people agreed with Macron's decision to resign.

== 2017 presidential campaign ==
=== First round ===
Macron first showed an intention to run by forming En Marche ! and his resignation allowed him to dedicate himself to his movement. He announced that he was considering running for president in April 2016, and after his resignation, media sources reported patterns in Macron's fundraising matching typical presidential campaign tactics. In October 2016, Macron criticized Hollande's goal of serving as a "normal" president, saying that France needed a more "Jupiterian presidency".

On 16 November 2016, Macron formally declared his candidacy. In his announcement speech, Macron called for a "democratic revolution" and promised to "unblock France". He had expressed hope that Hollande would run several months earlier, saying that, as the sitting president, he was the legitimate candidate for the Socialist Party. Macron's book Révolution was published on 24 November 2016 and reached fifth position on the French best-seller list in December 2016.

Shortly after announcing his run, Jean-Christophe Cambadélis and Valls both asked Macron to run in the Socialist Party presidential primary, which Macron ultimately chose not to do. Cambadélis began to threaten to exclude Socialist party members who associated with or supported Macron following Lyon mayor Gérard Collomb's declaration of support for Macron.

Macron's campaign, headed by French economist Sophie Ferracci, announced in December 2016 that it had raised 3.7 million euros in donations without public funding (as En Marche ! was not a registered political party). This was three times the budget of then-front-runner Alain Juppé. Benoît Hamon requested that Macron reveal a list of his donors amidst accusations of conflicts of interest due to his work for Rothschild & Co, which Macron dismissed as "demagogy", invoking donor's right to privacy. Atlantico later reported that Macron had spent €120,000 setting up dinners and meetings with various personalities within the media and in French popular culture while at Bercy. Macron was then accused by deputies Christian Jacob and Philippe Vigier of using this money to aid En Marche !. Sapin, his successor to the post, saw nothing illegal about Macron's actions, saying that he had the right to spend the funds. Macron said the allegations were "defamatory" and that none of the ministerial budget had been spent on his party.

Macron's campaign enjoyed considerable media coverage. Mediapart reported that Macron had over fifty magazine covers dedicated purely to him compared to Melenchon's "handful", despite similar online followings and both displaying momentum during the campaign. Macron was consistently labelled by the far-left and far-right as the "media candidate" and was viewed as such in opinion polls. He was friends with the owners of Le Monde and Claude Perdiel (former owner of Nouvel Observateur). Many observers compared Macron's campaign to marketing a product. Maurice Lévy, a former CEO, used "marketing tactics" to try to advance Macron's presidential ambitions. The magazine Marianne has reported that BFMTV, owned by Patrick Drahi, broadcast more coverage of Macron than of the other four main candidates combined, Marianne said this may be due to Macron's campaign's links with Drahi through Drahi's former colleague, Bernard Mourad.

After a range of comparisons to centrist François Bayrou, Bayrou announced he was not going to stand in the presidential election and instead form an electoral alliance with Macron launched on 22 February 2017, and lasted as En Marche ! and the Democratic Movement became allies in the National Assembly. Following this, Macron's poll ratings began to rise and after several legal issues surrounding François Fillon become publicized, Macron overtook him to become the front runner after polls showed him beating National Front candidate Marine Le Pen in the second round.

Macron attracted criticism for the time taken to spell out a formal program during his campaign; despite declaring in November that he had not released a complete set of proposals by February, attracting attacks from critics and concern among supporters. He eventually laid out his 150-page formal program on 2 March, publishing it online and discussing it at a marathon press conference that day.

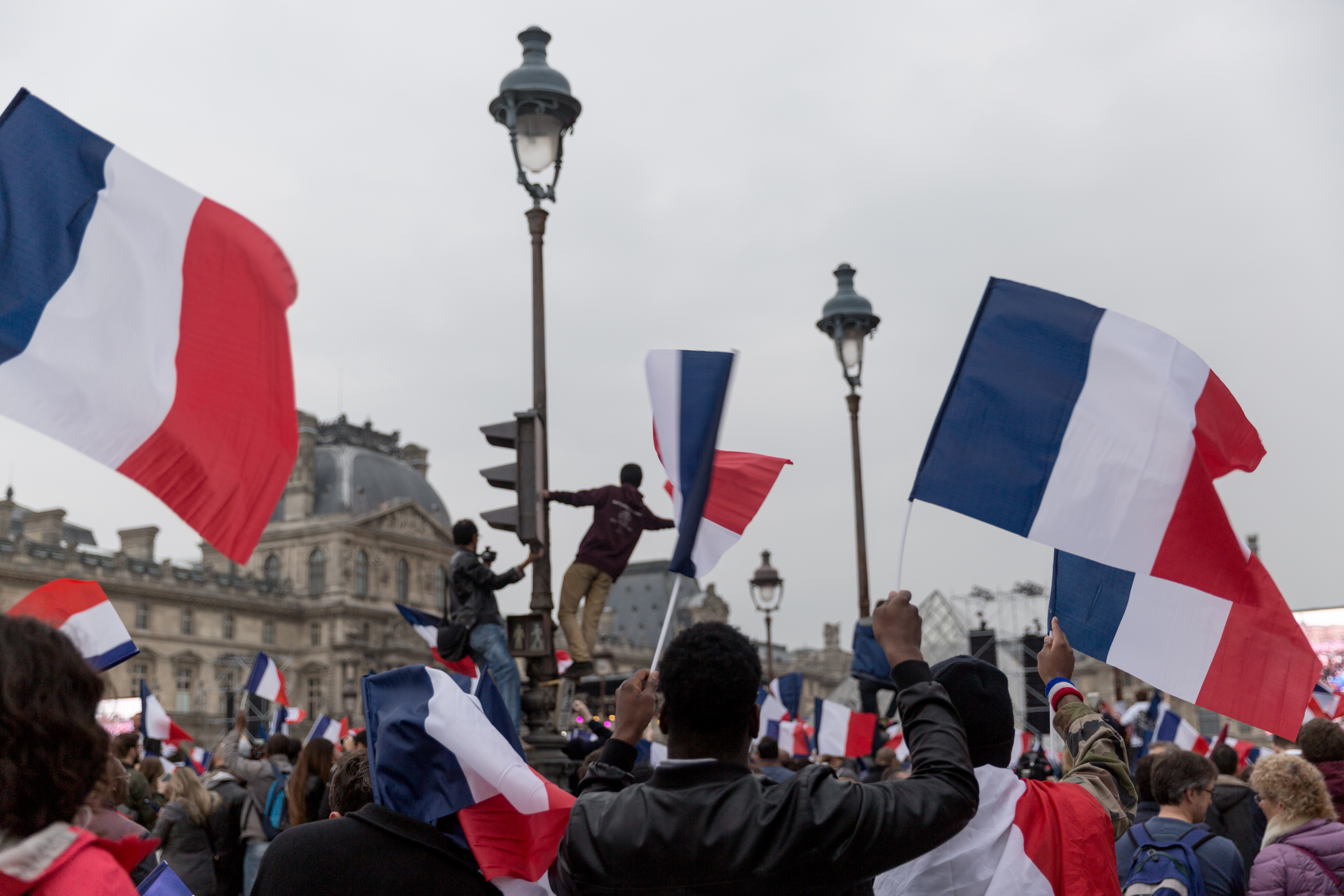
Macron's supporters celebrating his victory at the Louvre on 7 May 2017

Macron secured endorsements from Bayrou of the Democratic Movement (MoDem), MEP Daniel Cohn-Bendit, ecology candidate François de Rugy of the primary of the left, and Socialist MP Richard Ferrand, secretary-general of En Marche !, as well as numerous others – many from the Socialist Party, but also centrist and centre-right politicians. The Grand Mosque of Paris urged French Muslims to vote en masse for Macron.

On 23 April 2017, Macron received the most votes in the first round of the presidential election, with 24% of the overall vote or more than 8 million votes. He progressed to the second round with Marine Le Pen. Fillon and Hamon endorsed Macron.

=== Second round ===
Hollande also endorsed Macron. Many foreign politicians voiced support for Macron in his bid, including European Commission President Jean-Claude Juncker, German Chancellor Angela Merkel, and former US President Barack Obama.

A debate was arranged between Macron and Le Pen on 3 May 2017. The debate lasted for 2 hours and opinion polls scored the match for Macron.

In March 2017, Macron's digital campaign manager, Mounir Mahjoubi, said that Russia is behind "high level attacks" on Macron, and said that its state media are "the first source of false information". He said: "We are accusing RT (formerly known as Russia Today) and Sputnik News (of being) the first source of false information shared about our candidate ...".

Two days before the 7 May election, it was reported that nine gigabytes of Macron's campaign emails had been anonymously posted to Pastebin, a document-sharing site. These documents were then spread onto 4chan, which led to the hashtag "#macronleaks" trending on Twitter. In a statement, En Marche ! said, "The En Marche ! movement has been the victim of a massive and coordinated hack this evening which has given rise to the diffusion on social media of various internal information". Macron's campaign had been presented a report in March 2017 by Japanese cyber security firm Trend Micro detailing how En Marche ! had been the target of phishing attacks. Trend Micro accused Russian hacking group Fancy Bear of the attack. Fancy Bear was also accused of hacking the Democratic National Committee on 22 July 2016. These same emails were released in July 2017 by WikiLeaks; some were verified. This was after Le Pen accused Macron of tax avoidance.

On 7 May 2017, Macron was elected President of France with 66.1% of the vote compared to Marine Le Pen's 33.9%. The election had record abstention at 25.4% and 8% of ballots were blank or spoilt. Macron resigned from his role as president of En Marche ! and Catherine Barbaroux became interim leader.

== First term ==
Presidency of Emmanuel Macron
- 2017–2022

People and organisations
- President of the Republic: Emmanuel Macron
- Prime Minister: Édouard Philippe (2017–2020); Jean Castex (2020–2022)
- Prime Minister's history: First Philippe government (May 2017–June 2017); Second Philippe government (June 2017–July 2020); Castex government (2020–2022)
- Ministers removed: 18
- Member parties: LREM; MoDem; Agir; TDP; MR
- Status in legislature: Majority 346 / 577 (60%)
- Opposition parties: LR; LFI; PS; FN-RN

History
- Elections: 2017 French presidential election; 2017 French legislative elections
- Legislature terms: 2012–2017 (no longer sitting); 2017–2022

At 39, Macron was the youngest president in French history and the youngest French head of state since Napoleon. He was the first president born after the establishment of the Fifth Republic in 1958.

Macron formally became president on 14 May.

His first official foreign visit was to meet in Berlin with Angela Merkel, the Chancellor of Germany. The two leaders emphasised the importance of France–Germany relations to the European Union. They agreed to draw up a "common road map" for Europe, insisting that neither was against changes to the Treaties of the European Union.

In the 2017 legislative election, Macron's party La République En Marche ! and its Democratic Movement allies secured a comfortable majority, winning 350 seats out of 577. After The Republicans emerged as the winners of the Senate elections, government spokesman Christophe Castaner stated the elections were a "failure" for his party.

=== Appointments ===
- Patrick Strzoda: chief of staff
- Ismaël Emelien: special advisor for strategy, communication and speeches.
- Édouard Philippe (Republican): Prime Minister (May).
- Jean Castex (Republican): Prime Minister (July). Castex was seen as a social conservative. The appointment was described as a "doubling down on a course that is widely seen as centre-right in economic terms".

=== Domestic affairs ===
In his first few months as president, Macron pressed for the enactment of reforms on ethics, labour laws, taxes, and law enforcement.

In 2017, Paris was selected for the 2024 Summer Olympics, after a bidding process that had started in 2015.

In 2018, the government announced the cancellation of the Aéroport du Grand Ouest project.

==== Anti-corruption ====
In response to Penelopegate, the National Assembly passed part of Macron's proposed law to stop corruption in French politics in July 2017, banning elected representatives from hiring family members. The second part of the law scrapping a constituency fund was scheduled for voting after Senate objections.

Macron's plan to give his wife an official role within government came under fire with criticisms ranging that it was undemocratic to the ostensible contradiction to his fight against nepotism. Following an online petition of nearly 290,000 signatures, he abandoned the plan. On 9 August, the National Assembly adopted the bill on public ethics, a key theme of Macron's campaign, after debates on scrapping constituency funds.

==== Labour policy ====
Macron aimed to shift union-management relations away from the adversarial lines of the current French system and toward a more flexible, consensus-driven system modelled after Germany and Scandinavia.

He pledged to act against companies employing cheaper Eastern European labour and affecting French workers, what he termed "social dumping". Under the Posted Workers Directive 1996, eastern European workers can be employed for a limited time at the salary level of Eastern European countries, which led to disputes between EU states.

The government announced the proposed changes to France's labour rules ("Code du Travail"), among the first steps taken by Macron to galvanize the French economy. Macron's reform efforts encountered resistance from some French trade unions. The largest, CFDT, took a conciliatory approach and engaged in negotiations with the president, while the more militant CGT was more hostile to reforms. Labour minister Muriel Pénicaud oversaw the effort.

The National Assembly including the Senate approved the proposal, allowing the government to loosen labour laws after negotiations with unions and employers' groups. The reforms, as discussed with the unions, limited payouts for dismissals deemed unfair and gave companies greater freedom to hire/fire and to define working conditions. The president signed five decrees on 22 September. Government figures released in October 2017 revealed that during the legislative push, the unemployment rate had dropped 1.8%, the biggest since 2001.

On 16 March 2023 France enacted a law raising the retirement age from 62 to 64, leading to protests.

==== Migrant crisis ====
Speaking on refugees and, specifically, the Calais Jungle, Macron said on 6 January 2018 that he would not allow another refugee camp to form in Paris and outlined government policy towards immigration and asylum. He announced plans to speed up asylum applications and deportations, but give refugees better housing.

On 23 June 2018, Macron said: "The reality is that Europe is not experiencing a migration crisis of the same magnitude as the one it experienced in 2015....a country like Italy has not at all the same migratory pressure as last year. The crisis we are experiencing today in Europe is a political crisis". In November 2019, Macron introduced immigration rules to restrict the number of refugees reaching France.

In 2022, the number of foreigners coming to France rose above 320,000 for the first time, with a near majority from Africa. A significant increase in students, family reunification and labor migration occurred.

==== Economic policy ====
Pierre de Villiers, then-Chief of the General Staff of the Armies, stepped down on 19 July 2017 following a confrontation with Macron. De Villiers cited the military budget cut of €850 million as the main reason he was stepping down. Le Monde later reported that De Villiers told a parliamentary group, "I will not let myself be fucked like this." Macron named François Lecointre as De Villiers' replacement.

Macron's government presented its first budget on 27 September, the terms of which reduced taxes and spending to bring the government deficit in line with EU fiscal rules. The budget replaced the wealth tax with one targeting real estate, fulfilling Macron's campaign pledge. Before it was replaced, the tax collected up to 1.5% of the wealth of French residents whose global worth exceeded €1.3m.

In February 2017, Macron announced a plan to offer voluntary redundancy in an attempt to shrink the French civil service. In December 2019, Macron announced that he would scrap the 20th-century pension system and introduce a single, state-managed national pension system. In January 2020, after weeks of protest against the pension plan, including transport shutdown and vandalism across Paris, Macron compromised by revising the retirement age. In February, the pension overhaul was adopted by decree using Article 49 of the French constitution.

==== Terrorism ====
The National Assembly on 3 October passed a controversial bill with stricter anti-terror laws, a Macron campaign pledge. Interior Minister Gérard Collomb described France as "still in a state of war" ahead of the vote, following the 1 October Marseille stabbing two days prior. The Senate then passed it on 18 October. Later that day Macron stated that 13 terror plots had been foiled since 2017 began. The law replaced the state of emergency in France and made some of its provisions permanent. A public poll by Le Figaro showed 57% of respondents approved it even though 62% thought it would encroach on personal freedoms.

The law gives authorities expanded power to search homes, restrict movement, close places of worship, and search areas around train stations as well as international ports and airports. It passed after modifications to address civil liberty concerns. The most punitive measures will be reviewed annually and were scheduled to lapse by the end of 2020. Macron announced that starting 1 November, the state of emergency would end.

==== Civil rights ====
Visiting Corsica in February 2018, Macron sparked controversy when he rejected Corsican nationalist wishes for Corsican as an official language but offered to recognize Corsica in the French constitution.

Macron proposed a plan to "reorganise" the Islamic religion in France saying: "We are working on the structuring of Islam in France and also on how to explain it, which is extremely important – my goal is to rediscover what lies at the heart of laïcité, the possibility of being able to believe as not to believe, in order to preserve national cohesion and the possibility of having free consciousness."

=== Foreign policy and national defence ===
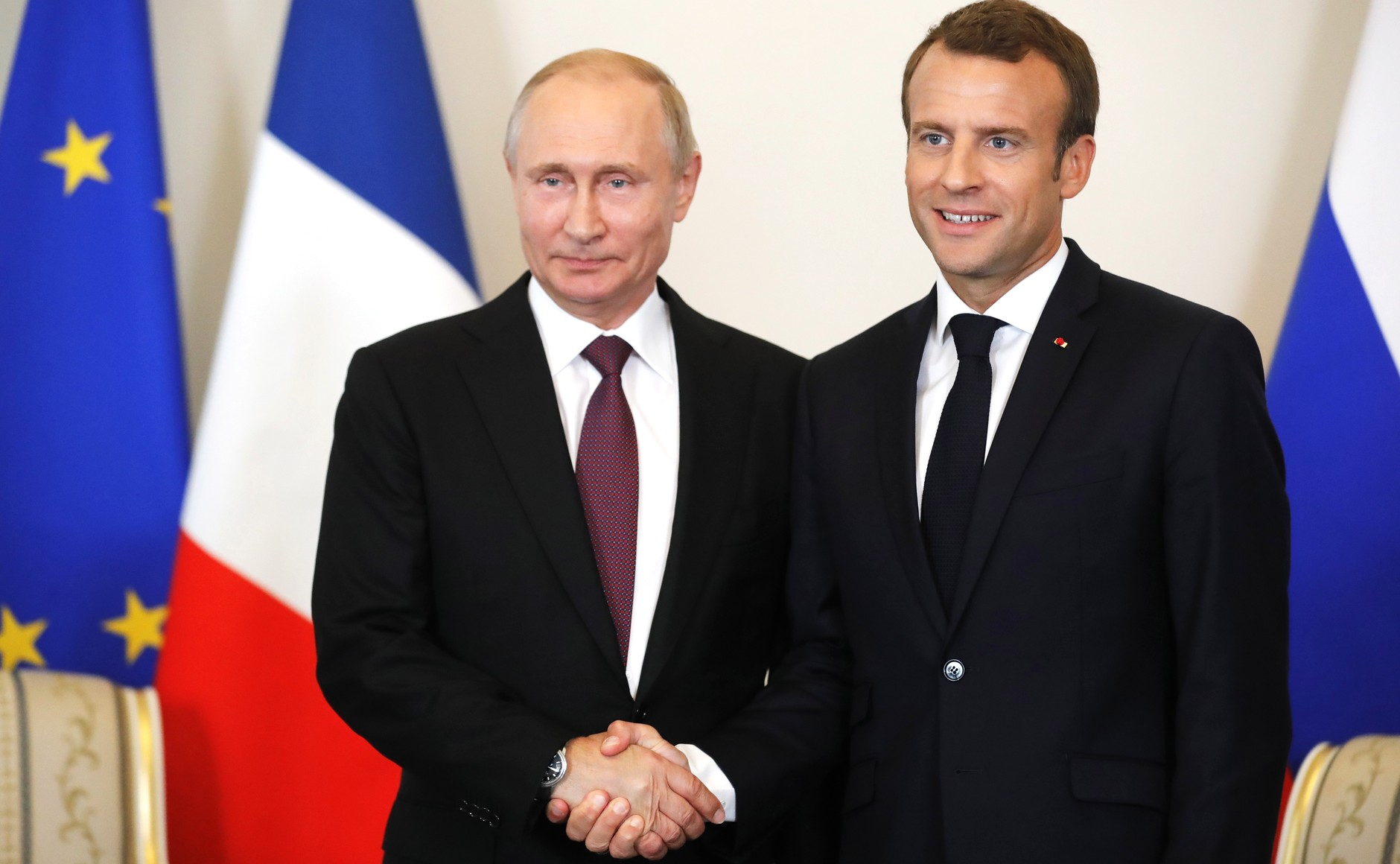
Macron with Russian president Vladimir Putin in Saint Petersburg, 24 May 2018

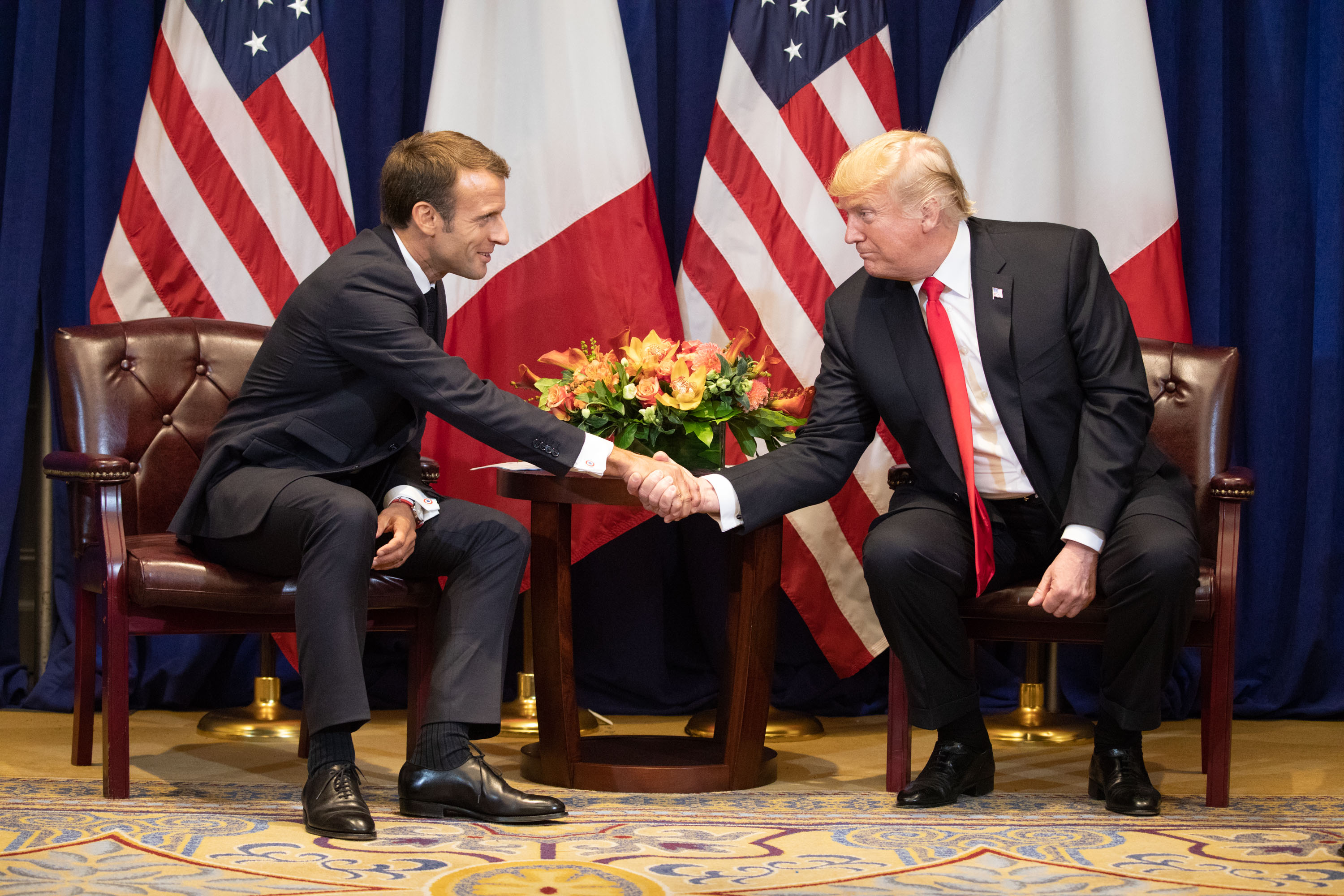
Macron shakes hands with US President Donald Trump in September 2018

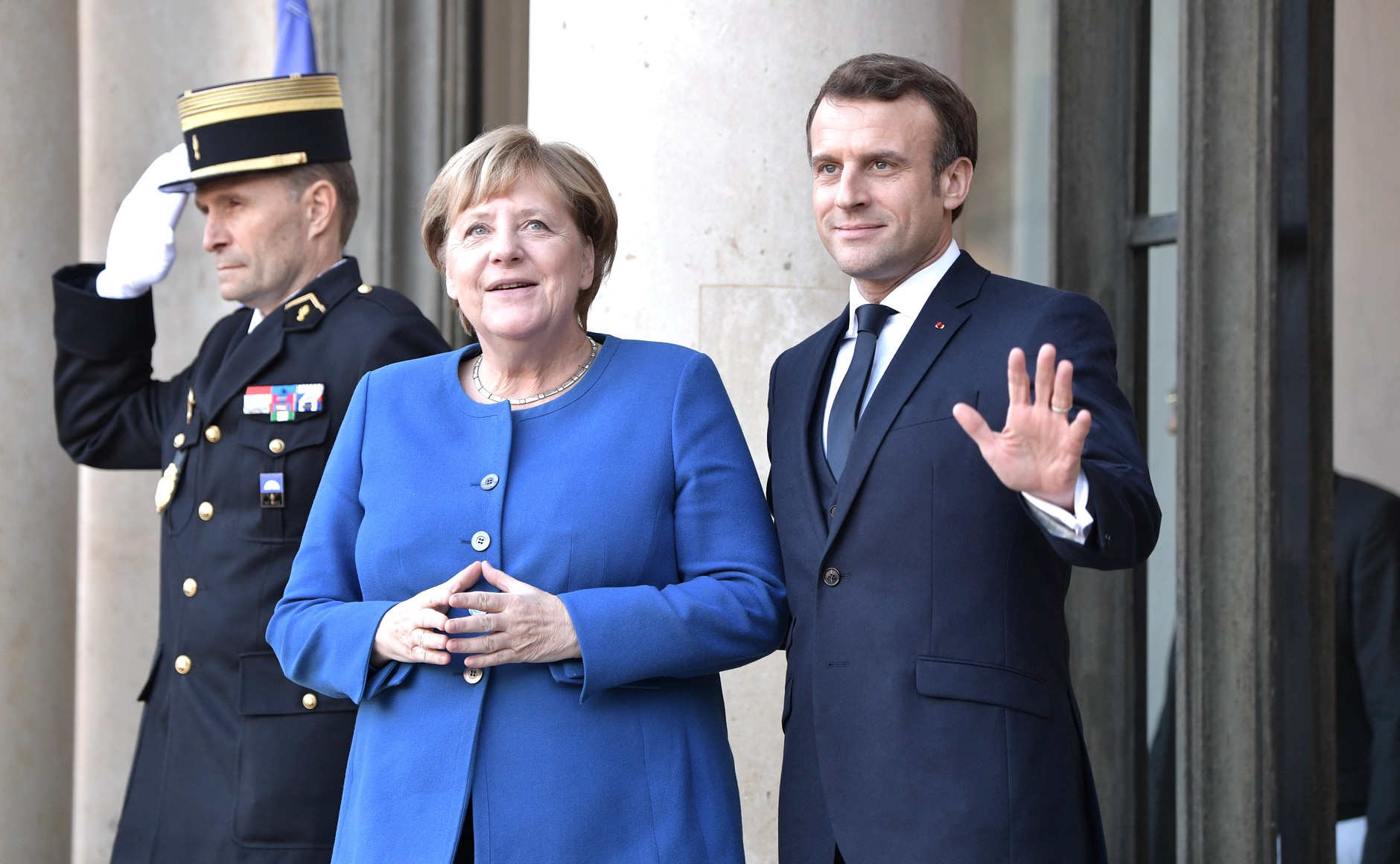
Macron with German Chancellor Angela Merkel in Paris in December 2019

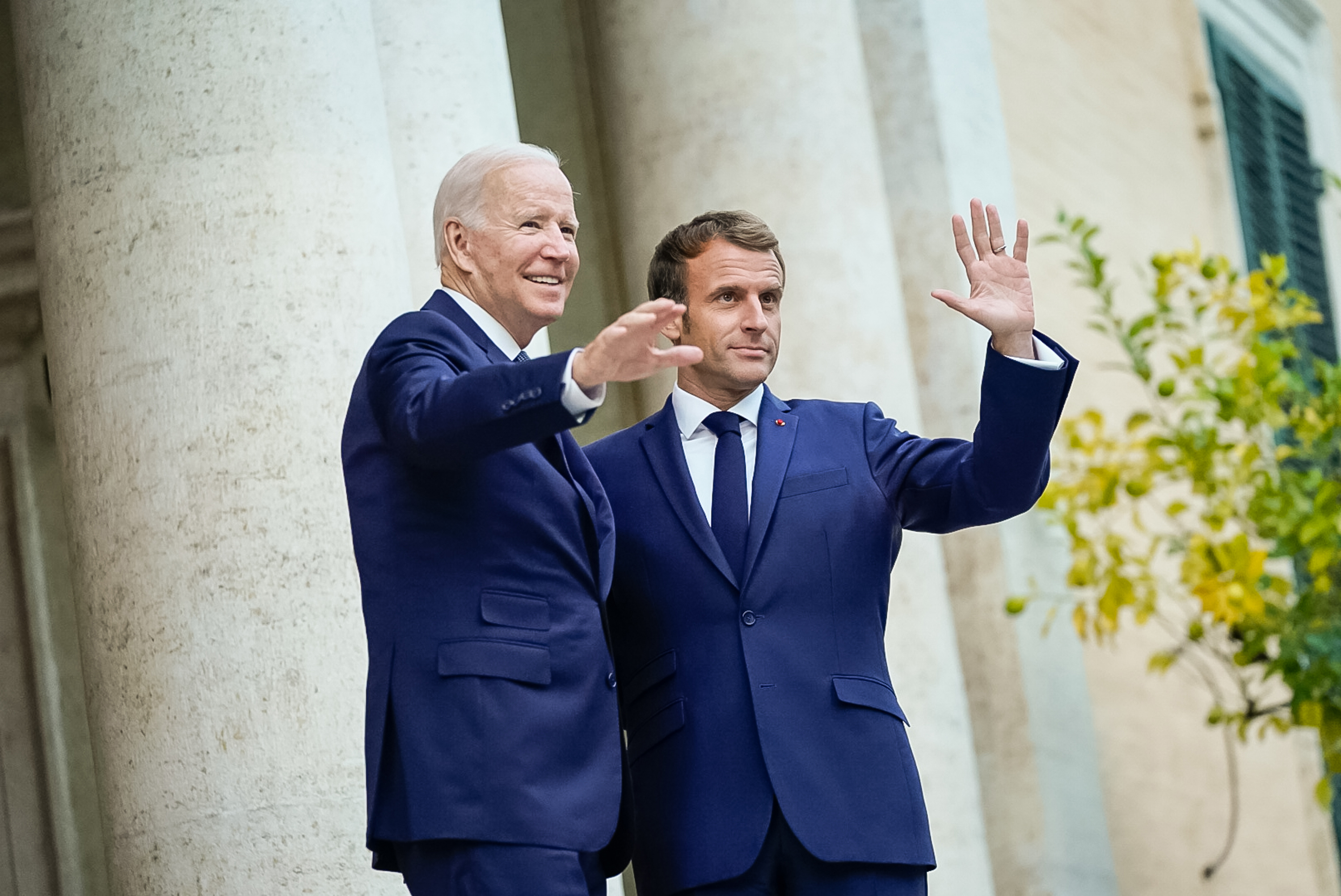
Macron with US President Joe Biden at the G20 summit in October 2021

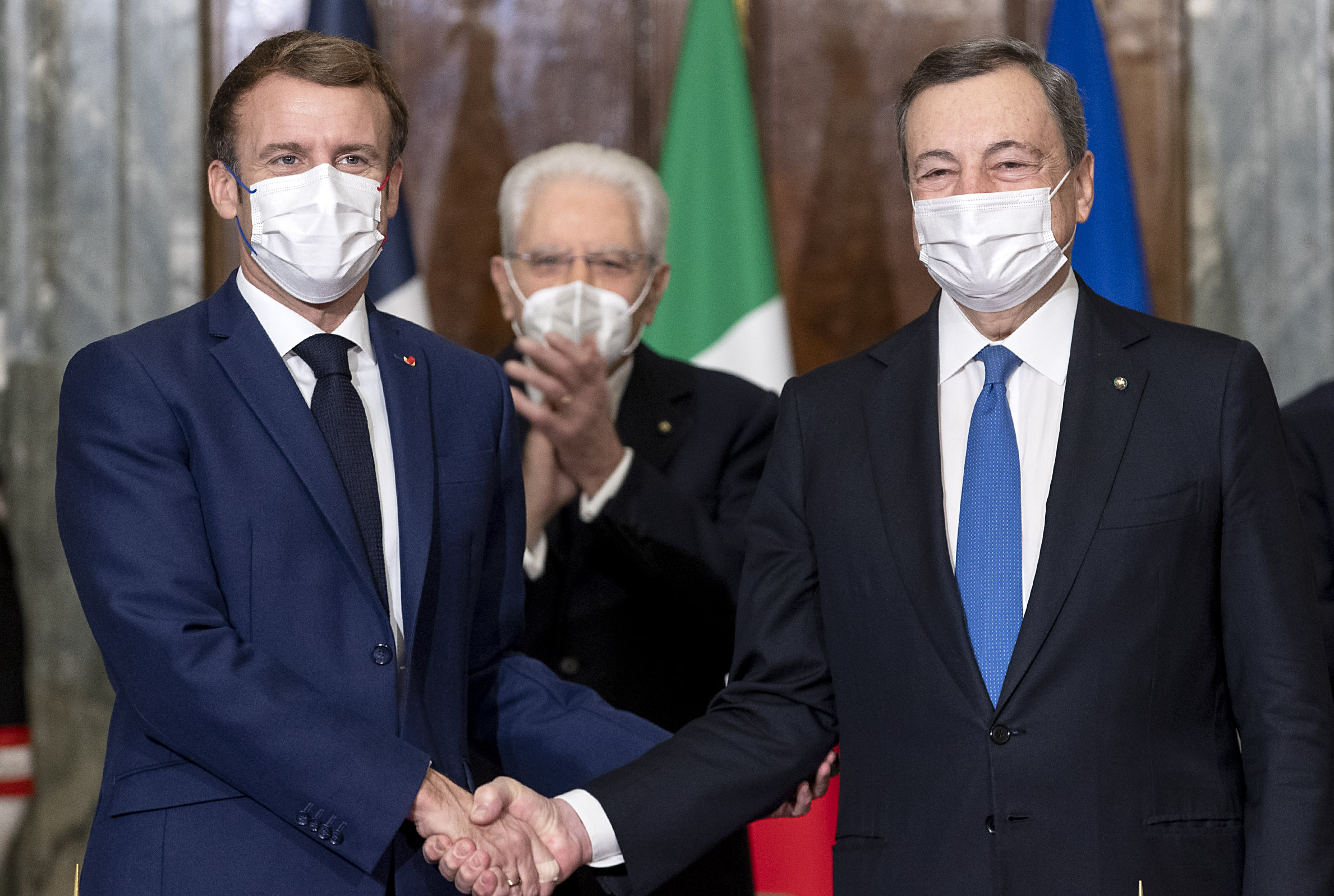
Macron and Italian Prime Minister Mario Draghi in 2021, following the signing of the Quirinal Treaty

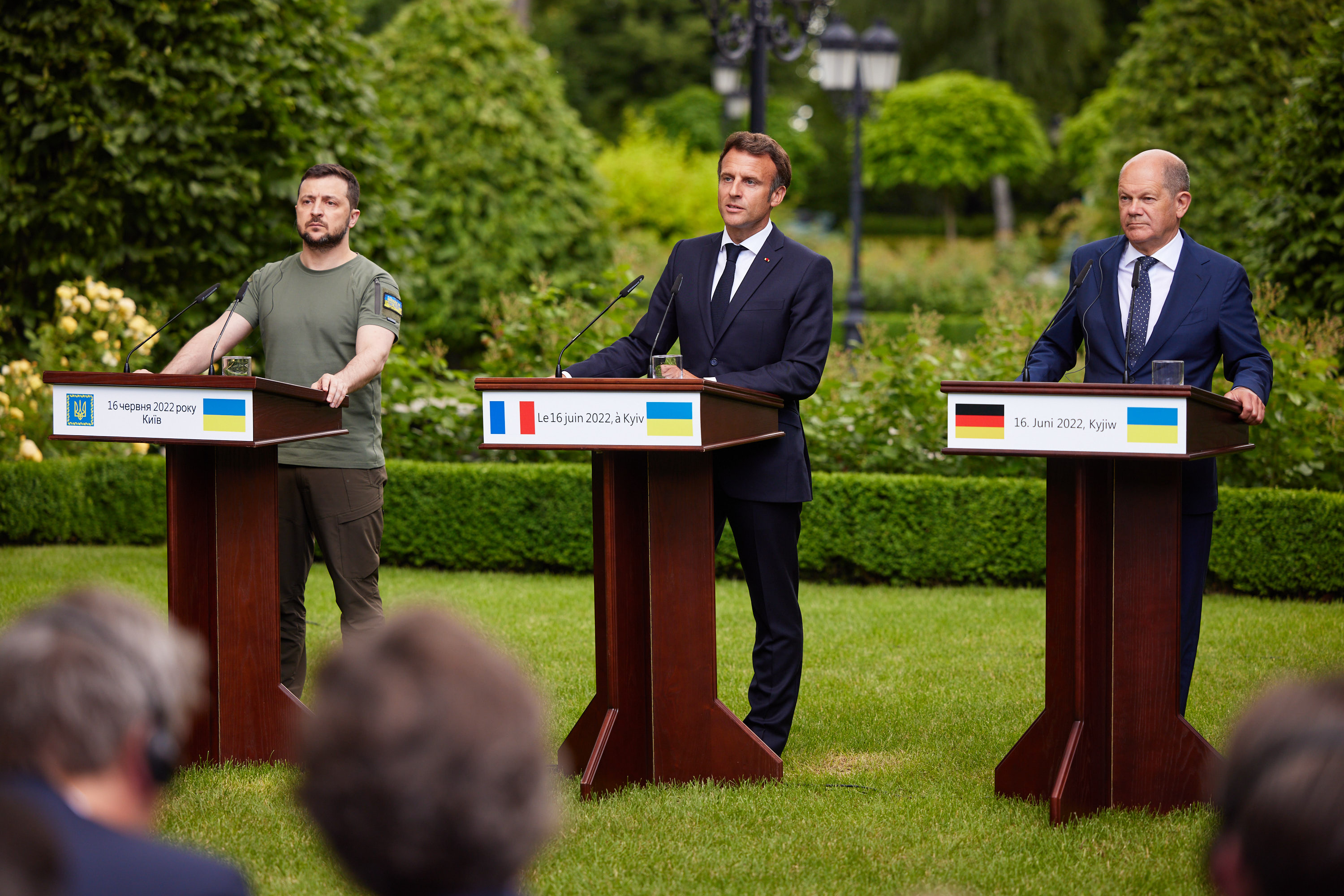
Macron, Ukrainian President Volodymyr Zelenskyy and German Chancellor Olaf Scholz in Kyiv in 2022

Macron attended the 25 May 2017 Brussels summit, his first NATO summit as president. At the summit, he met US President Donald Trump for the first time. The meeting was widely publicized after their handshake was characterized as a "power-struggle".

On 29 May 2017, Macron met with Russian President Vladimir Putin at the Palace of Versailles. The meeting sparked controversy when Macron denounced Russia Today and Sputnik, saying they were "organs of influence and propaganda, of lying propaganda". Macron also urged cooperation in the conflict against ISIS and warned that France would respond with force in Syria if chemical weapons were used. In response to the chemical attack in Douma, Syria in 2018, Macron directed French participation in airstrikes against Syrian government sites, coordinated with the US and UK.

In his first major foreign policy speech on 29 August, Macron stated that fighting Islamist terrorism at home and abroad was France's top priority. He urged pressure on North Korea for negotiations, on the same day it fired a missile over Japan. He affirmed his support for the Iranian nuclear deal. He criticized Venezuela's government as a dictatorship. He added that he would announce initiatives on the future of the EU after the German elections in September. At the 56th Munich Security Conference in February, Macron presented his 10-year vision to strengthen the EU. Macron recommended a larger budget, integrated capital markets, effective defence policy, and quick decision-making. He said that reliance on NATO, especially the US and the UK, was not good for Europe, and that a dialogue be established with Russia.

Prior to the 45th G7 summit in Biarritz, France, Macron hosted Putin at the Fort de Brégançon, stating that "Russia fully belongs within a Europe of values." At the summit itself, Macron was invited to attend by Zarif. Macron, who "attempted a high-risk diplomatic gambit", thought that the Foreign Minister might be able to defuse the tense situation over the Iranian nuclear programme in spite of the recent uptick in tensions between Iran and the US and UK.

In March 2019, during a trade war, Macron and Chinese President Xi Jinping signed 15 large-scale, multi-year trade and business agreements totaling 40 billion euros (US$45 billion) encompassing many sectors. This included a €30 billion purchase of airplanes from Airbus. The trade agreement covered French exports of chicken, a French-built offshore wind farm in China, a Franco-Chinese cooperation fund, as well as billions of Euros of co-financing between BNP Paribas and Bank of China. Other plans included billions of euros to be spent on modernizing Chinese factories, as well as shipbuilding.

In July 2020, Macron called for sanctions against Turkey for violating Greece's and Cyprus' sovereignty, saying it is "not acceptable that the maritime space of (EU) member states be violated and threatened". He criticized Turkish military intervention in Libya. Macron said that "We have the right to expect more from Turkey than from Russia, given that it is a member of NATO."

In 2021, Macron was reported as saying Northern Ireland was not truly part of the United Kingdom following disputes with UK Prime Minister Boris Johnson over the Northern Ireland protocol. He later denied this, saying he was referring to the fact that Great Britain is separated from Northern Ireland by sea in reference to the Irish Sea border.

French-US relations became tense in September 2021 due to fallout from the AUKUS security pact. The security pact was directed at countering Chinese power in the Indo-Pacific region. As part of the agreement, the US agreed to provide nuclear-powered submarines to Australia. After entering into AUKUS, the Australian government canceled an agreement that it had made with France for the provision of French conventionally powered submarines, angering France. On 17 September, France recalled its ambassadors from Australia and the US for consultations. Despite past tension, France had never before withdrawn its US ambassador. After a call between Macron and President Joe Biden on request from the latter, the two leaders agreed to reduce bilateral tensions, and the White House acknowledged the crisis could have been averted by open consultations.

On 26 November 2021, Macron cosigned the "Quirinal Treaty" with Italian Prime Minister Mario Draghi. The treaty aimed to promote the convergence and coordination of French and Italian positions in matters of European and foreign policies, security and defence, migration policy, economy, education, research, culture and cross-border cooperation.

During the prelude to the 2022 Russian invasion of Ukraine, Macron spoke face-to-face to Putin. Two months after the Russian invasion began, Macron called on European leaders to maintain dialogue with Putin.

== 2022 presidential campaign ==
Macron formally announced his candidacy on 3 March 2022, after delaying his announcement mostly due to the fact that on Putin's orders Russian Armed Forces had begun the invasion of Ukraine, violating international law.

After a short campaign, begun only 38 days before the French voters were due to go to the polls on 10 April 2022, Macron topped the first round of the French presidential election with 27.8% of the votes, well ahead of Le Pen who finished 2nd with 23.2% of the votes.

In the second round, on 24 April, Emmanuel Macron was reelected with 58.55% of the votes, a smaller margin than in his first term. He was the first president to be re-elected since Chirac was re-elected in 2002. His second term officially began on 14 May 2022.

== Second term ==
Presidency of Emmanuel Macron
- 2022–present

People and organisations
- Prime Minister: Jean Castex (outgoing); Élisabeth Borne (2022–2024); Gabriel Attal (2024); Michel Barnier (2024); François Bayrou (2024–2025); Sébastien Lecornu (2025–present)
- Prime Minister's history: Castex government (outgoing); Borne government (2022–2024); Attal government (2024); Barnier government (2024); Bayrou government (2024–2025); First Lecornu government (2025); Second Lecornu government (2025–present)
- Member parties: RE; MoDem; HOR
- Status in legislature: Majority (May–June 2022); Minority (June 2022–present); 346 / 577 (60%) (May–June 2022); 249 / 577 (43%) (June 2022–June 2024); 212 / 577 (37%) (July 2024–present)
- Opposition parties: RN; NUPES (2022-2024); NFP (2024-present); LR

History
- Elections: 2022 French presidential election; 2022 French legislative election; 2024 French legislative election
- Legislature terms: 2017–2022 (no longer sitting); 2022–2024 (no longer sitting); 2024–present

=== Borne government and June 2022 legislative election ===
16th National Assembly of France, elected in 2022.

On 16 May 2022, Castex resigned after 22 months. The same day, Macron appointed Élisabeth Borne to replace him. She was serving as Minister of Labour and Employment. She became the second female PM in French history after Édith Cresson between 1991 and 1992. She formed a new government on 20 May 2022.

Macron's second term began with two political controversies: within hours of the new Cabinet's announcement, rape accusations against the newly appointed Minister for Solidarity Damien Abad were made public and, on 28 May, handling of the 2022 UEFA Champions League final chaos drew criticism.

In June 2022, Macron and his government fought the 2022 legislative election during an unusually long campaign dominated by the formation of the left-wing NUPES coalition seeking cohabitation and political controversies affecting his new cabinet. On 12 June, the first round left Macron's centrist alliance almost tied with Mélenchon's NUPES in the popular vote (25.8% v. 25.7%), both ahead of Le Pen's RN, which finished third with 18.7%.

With most opinion polls showing his coalition's lead shrinking and the increasing possibility of a hung parliament, on 14 June, 5 days before the second round and moments before departing Paris to visit Eastern Europe, Macron delivered an unexpected speech on the tarmac in which he called for a "solid majority" in the "higher national interest" and warned against the risk of "adding French disorder to global disorder". The speech, which intended to stress the importance of having a majority government in "troubled times", was criticized by opposition leaders and was widely regarded as "counterproductive", even inside Macron's camp.

On 19 June 2022, Macron lost his parliamentary majority and was returned a hung parliament in the second round. Macron's presidential coalition, which had a 115-seat majority going into the elections, failed to reach the threshold of 289 seats needed for a majority in the National Assembly, retaining only 251 out of the 346 it had held in the previous Assembly, and leaving the Borne government 38 shy of a working majority. Crucially, three close political allies of President Macron were defeated in the elections: incumbent President of the National Assembly Richard Ferrand, Macron's own LREM parliamentary party leader Christophe Castaner, and MoDem parliamentary group leader Patrick Mignola, thus effectively "decapitating" Macron's parliamentary bloc leadership and further weakening the President's political position.

Three government ministers lost their seats and, abiding by an unwritten rule constantly applied since Nicolas Sarkozy's presidency in 2007, then resigned: Justine Bénin (junior minister for the Sea), Brigitte Bourguignon (Minister for Health and Prevention) and Amélie de Montchalin (Minister for Ecological Transition).

On 4 July, after talks with opposition parties to form a stable majority government failed, Borne's government, was reshuffled and effectively continued as a minority government. This minority administration was the weakest Cabinet in the history of the French Fifth Republic from a parliamentary standpoint.

=== Domestic affairs ===
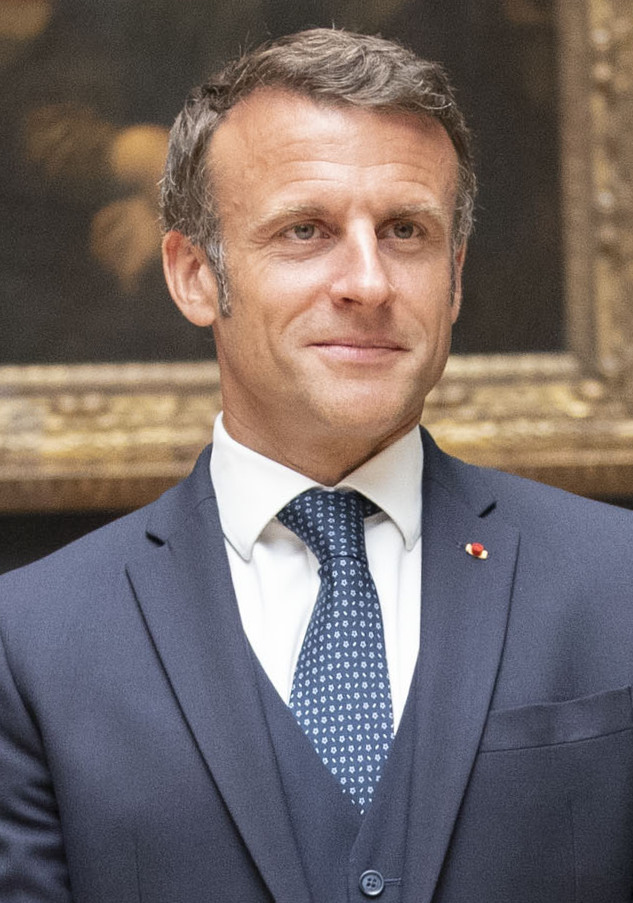
Macron in 2023

Despite its minority legislative status, Macron's government passed bills to ease the cost-of-living crisis, to repeal the COVID "sanitary state of emergency" and to revive the French nuclear energy sector. In November 2022, the Macron government reformed French unemployment insurance.

However, the government was defeated several times in Parliament – an oddity under the Fifth Republic – and at the end of 2022, the Borne Cabinet had to repeatedly commit its responsibility (using the provisions of Article 49.3 of the Constitution) to pass the 2023 Government Budget and Social Security Budget.

In February 2023, Macron's government introduced an immigration and asylum bill aimed at:

- removing deportation safeguards,
- fast-tracking the asylum application process and immigration litigation
- facilitating legalization of undocumented workers

His government later pulled the legislation in favor of talks with centre-right LR party before re-introducing the bill in the autumn.

In March 2023, Macron's government passed a law raising the retirement age from 62 to 64. They partly bypassed Parliament by resorting to the provisions of Article 49.3 of the Constitution in order to break the parliamentary deadlock; nationwide protests that had begun when the change was proposed increased after the vote. On 20 March, his Cabinet survived a cross-party motion of no-confidence by nine votes, the slimmest margin since 1992.

On 12 June 2023, Macron's Cabinet, led by Borne, survived the 17th no-confidence motion attempted during the 16th legislature: the motion, brought by the left-wing NUPES coalition, fell 50 votes short.

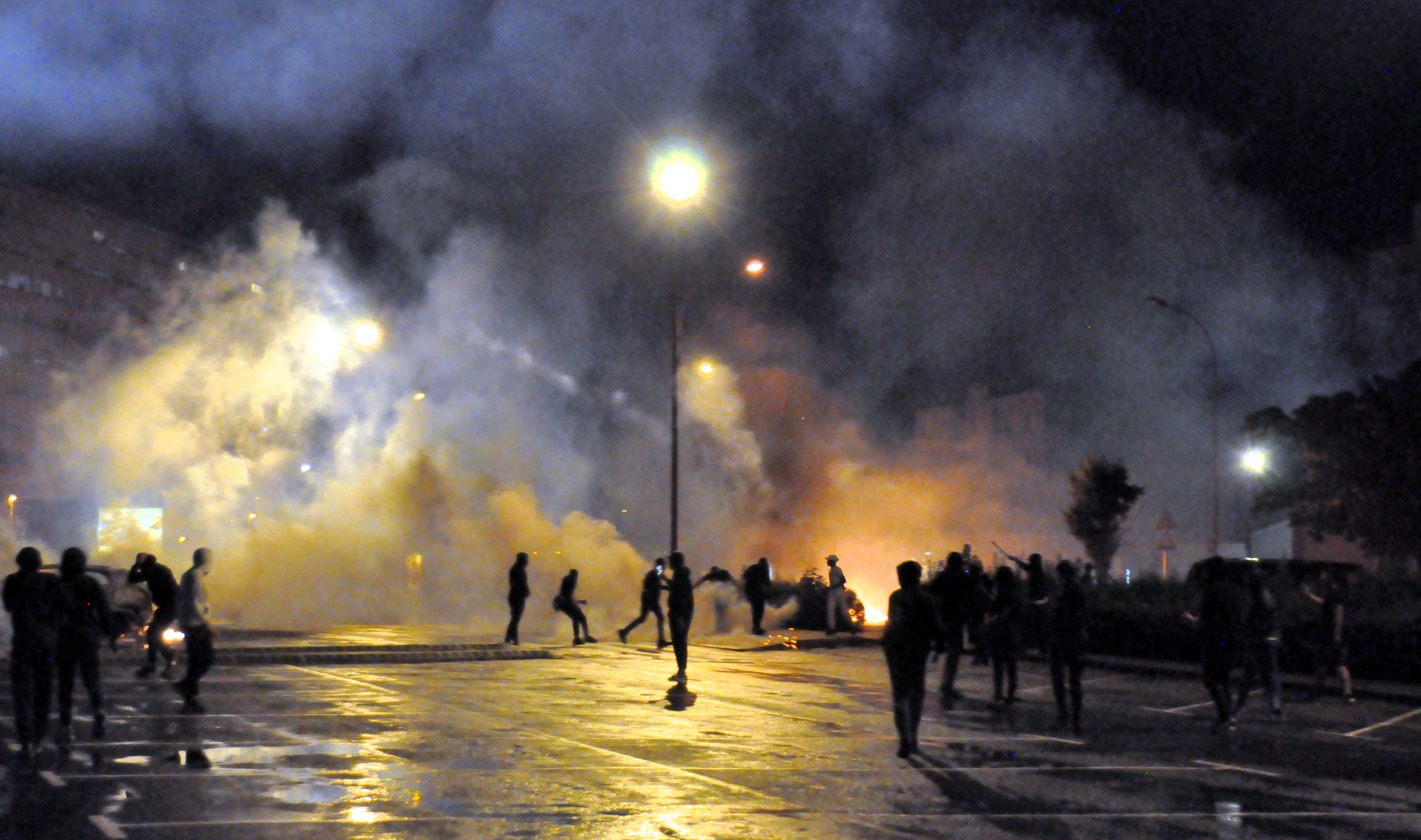
Riots in Besançon, France, on 29 June 2023

French authorities faced growing riots following the killing of Nahel M., aged 17, by a police officer during a traffic stop in the Parisian suburb of Nanterre. Racial unrest spread across the Paris region and other large cities. On 29 June, after a night of violence that resulted in over 150 arrests and property destruction, Macron chaired an inter-ministerial crisis meeting and his government ordered 40,000 police officers, including elite tactical units, to be deployed to stem the violence. Widespread violence, looting, and arson continued over the following days, in some places overtaking levels of unrest last seen during the 2005 French riots. Macron's administration deployed 45,000 police officers. A ministerial order from the Justice Ministry advised courts to apply harsher sentences and sped-up procedures. This crackdown resulted in over 1,300 arrests on the fourth night of unrest alone, bringing the total number of arrests since the riots' beginning to over 2,000 as of 1 July.

On 20 July, Macron reshuffled government at the end of the "hundred days of appeasement and action" he called for in April following violent protests over his pension system reform. Absent legislative progress on his domestic priorities and the continued lack of a working majority in Parliament, media reports emerged of a potential change of Prime Minister. On 17 July, Macron asked Borne to remain in office and invited her to make proposals for a "technical" reshuffle. Three days later, eight new ministers were appointed, three senior Cabinet ministers (Education, Health and Solidarity), and five junior ministers. National Education and Youth Minister Pap Ndiaye and State Secretary to the PM Marlène Schiappa came under public and parliamentary scrutiny in recent months, were sacked.

In August, Macron said that France "must significantly reduce immigration, starting with illegal immigration" because the "current situation is not sustainable".

On 11 December, Macron's "flagship" immigration bill was unexpectedly defeated. Political commentators and news media described the vote as a "spectacular debacle", eventually sparking a major political crisis.

In an effort to salvage the bill, Macron's government sent the legislation to a special parliamentary committee. This resulted in a deal with the conservative-controlled Senate on a hardened bill. On 19 December, the French Parliament passed the legislation thanks to support from the conservative LR and far-right RN parliamentary groups and in spite of a major rebellion from Macron's own coalition.

==== Attal government ====
In January 2024, Macron requested Borne's resignation and subsequently replaced her with Gabriel Attal, who became the youngest head of government in French history and the first openly gay Prime Minister.

=== Foreign policy and national defence ===
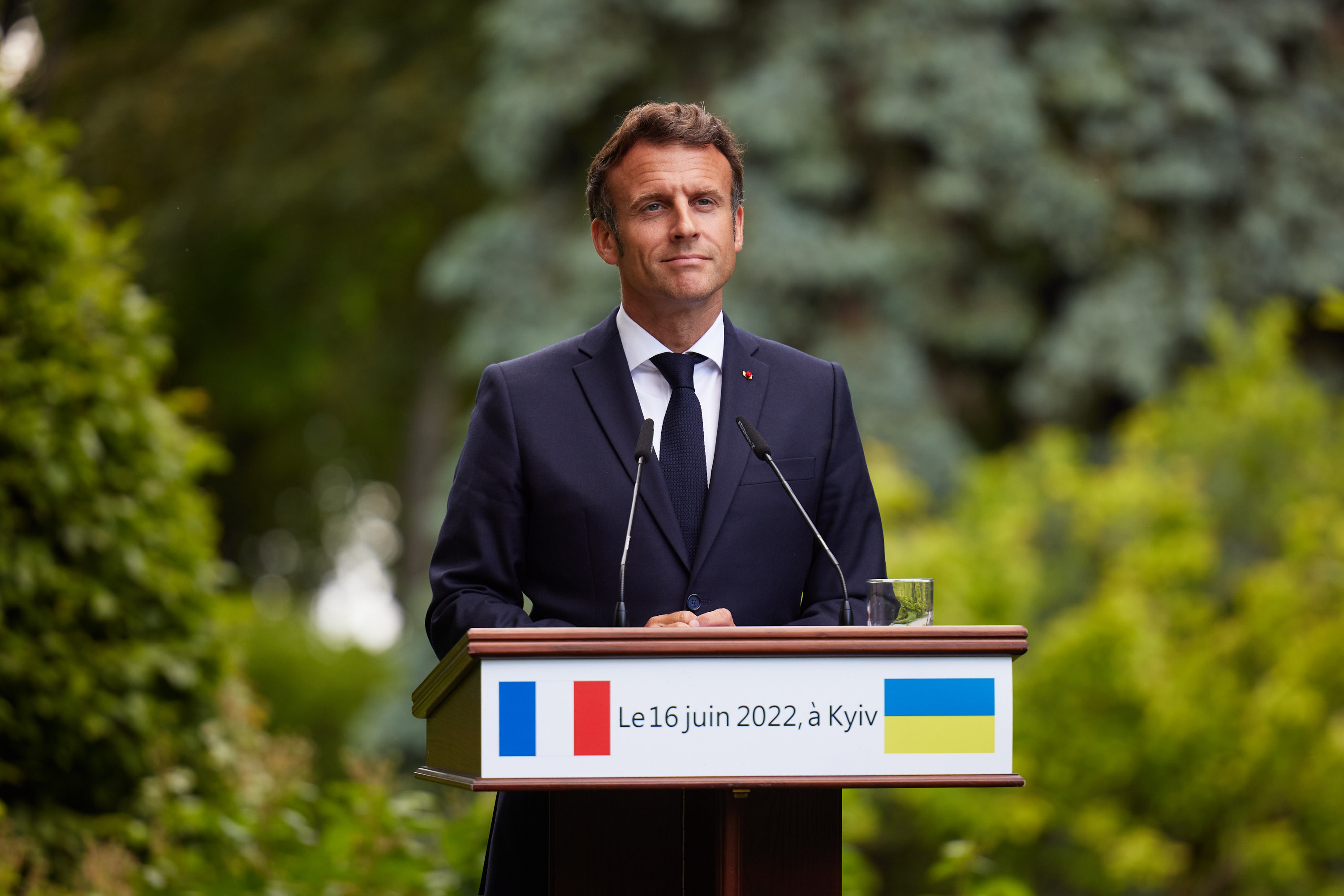
Macron visiting Kyiv, Ukraine in June 2022

On 16 June 2022, Macron visited Ukraine with German Chancellor Olaf Scholz and Italian Prime Minister Mario Draghi. He met with Ukrainian President Volodymyr Zelenskyy and expressed "European Unity". He said that nations who remained neutral in the Russo-Ukrainian War had made a historic mistake and were complicit in the new imperialism. In September, Macron criticized the US, Norway, and other "friendly" natural gas supplier states for the high prices of their supplies, saying in October that Europeans were "paying four times more than the price you sell to your industry. That is not exactly the meaning of friendship."

Macron and his wife attended the state funeral of Queen Elizabeth II.

==== 2023 ====
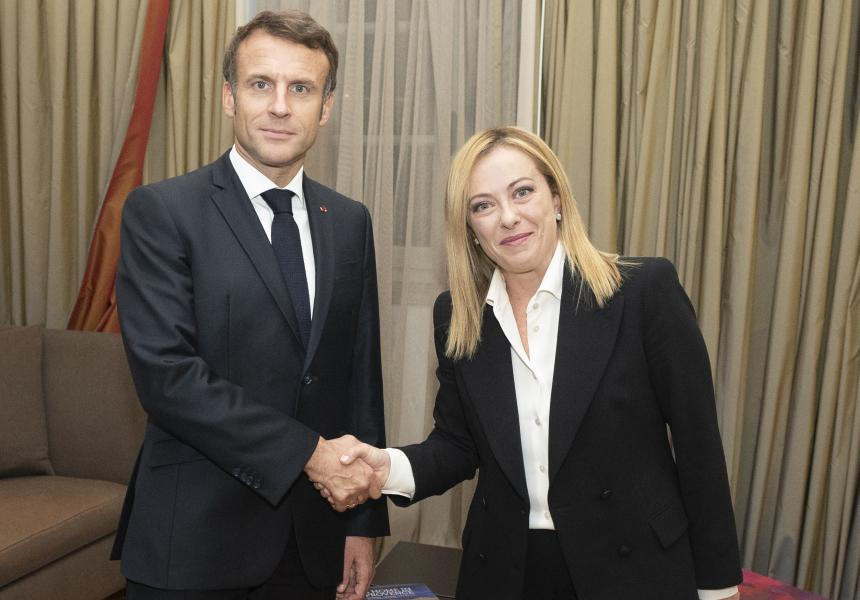
Macron and Meloni meeting on 23 October 2022

On 23 October, Macron became the first foreign leader to meet Italian President of the Council Giorgia Meloni, one day after she was sworn into office.

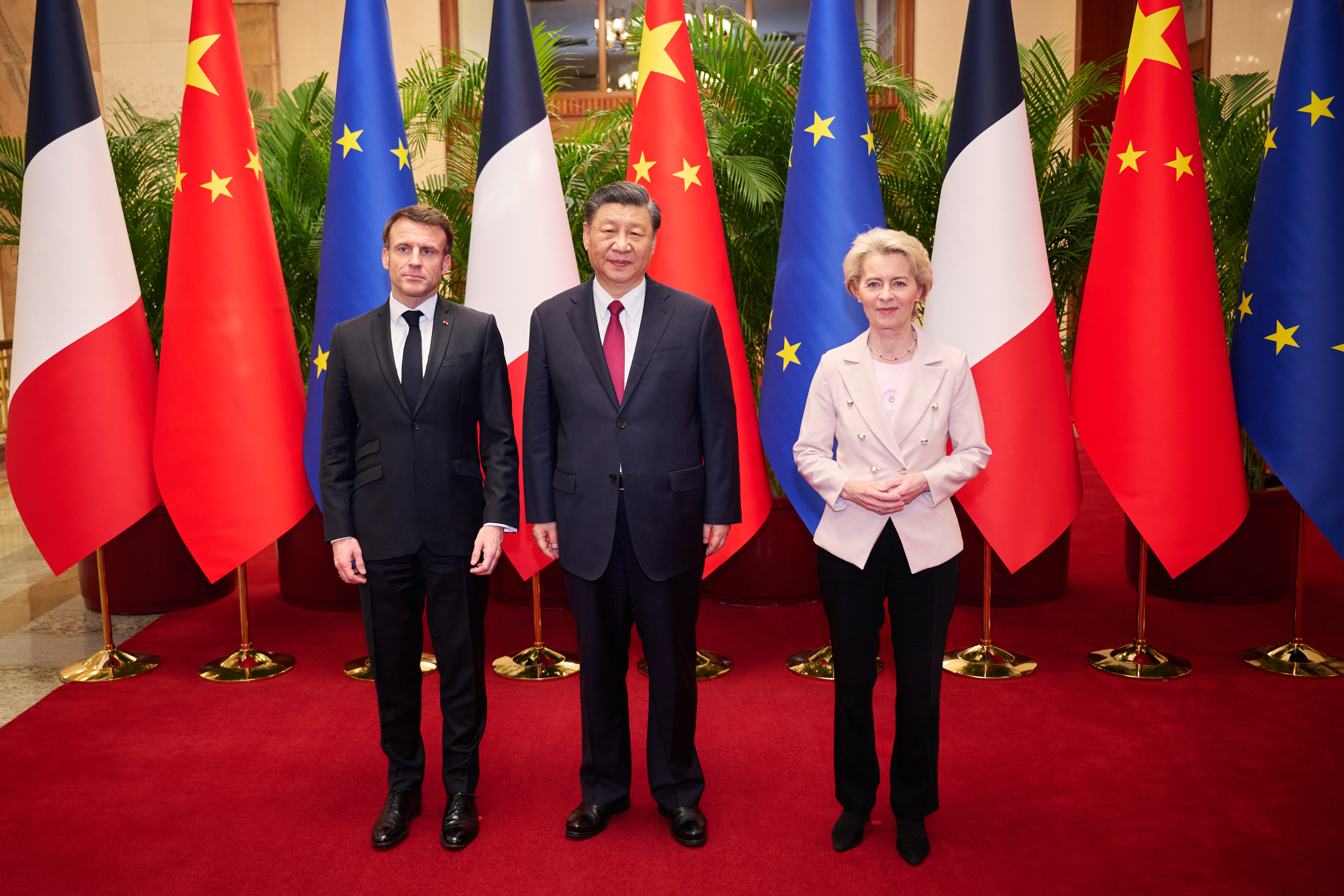
Macron, President of the European Commission Ursula von der Leyen and Chinese President Xi Jinping at the 2023 France–China Summit

During a meeting in China with European Commission President Ursula von der Leyen, which included a formal meeting with Xi, Macron called for Europe to reduce its dependence on the US and to stay neutral and avoid confrontations between the US and China over Taiwan. After a three-day state visit to China, Macron emphasized his theory of strategic autonomy, suggesting that Europe could become a "third superpower". He argued that Europe should focus on boosting its own defence industries and additionally reduce its dependence on the dollar (USD). Macron used a follow-up speech in The Hague to further outline his vision of strategic autonomy for Europe. On 7 June, a report by pan-European think tank European Council on Foreign Relations (ECFR) found that most Europeans agreed with Macron's views on China and the US.

In February, he welcomed Ethiopian Prime Minister Abiy Ahmed in Paris to normalize relations between France and Ethiopia that were strained by the Tigray War.

On 31 May, Macron visited the GLOBSEC forum in Bratislava, where he again spoke on European sovereignty. During the question and answer session that followed he said that negotiating with Putin may have to take priority.

On 12 April, he made a state visit to the Netherlands, the first by a French president in 23 years, during which he spoke on Europe and economic sovereignty. He was interrupted by protesters asking "Where is French democracy" and the next day by a man chanting On est là !, a yellow vest protest song.

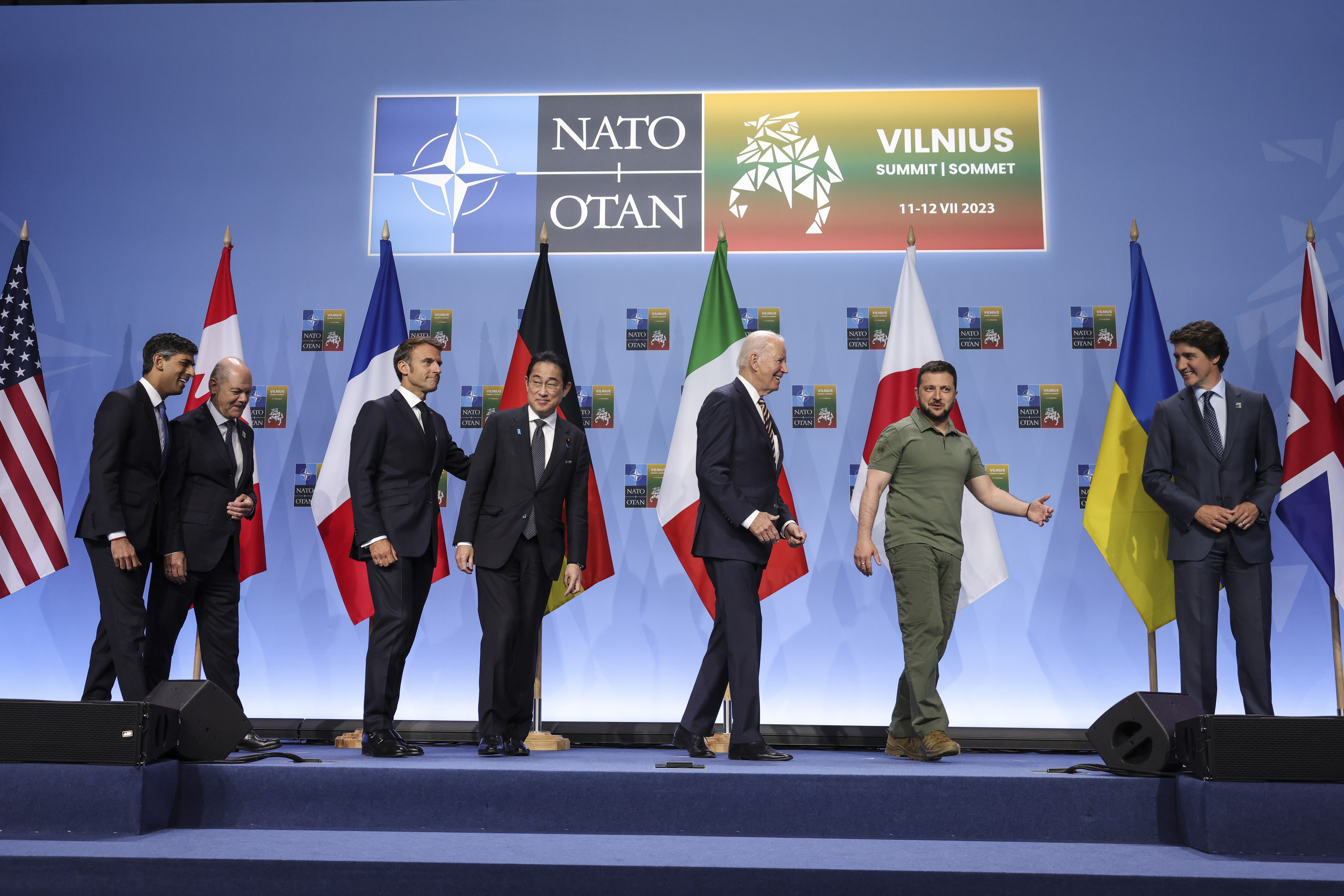
Macron at the NATO Summit in Vilnius on 12 July 2023

On 12 June, Macron promised to deliver more ammunition, weapons and armed vehicles to Ukraine. At the NATO Summit in Vilnius, he promised to supply Ukraine with Scalp long-range cruise missiles.

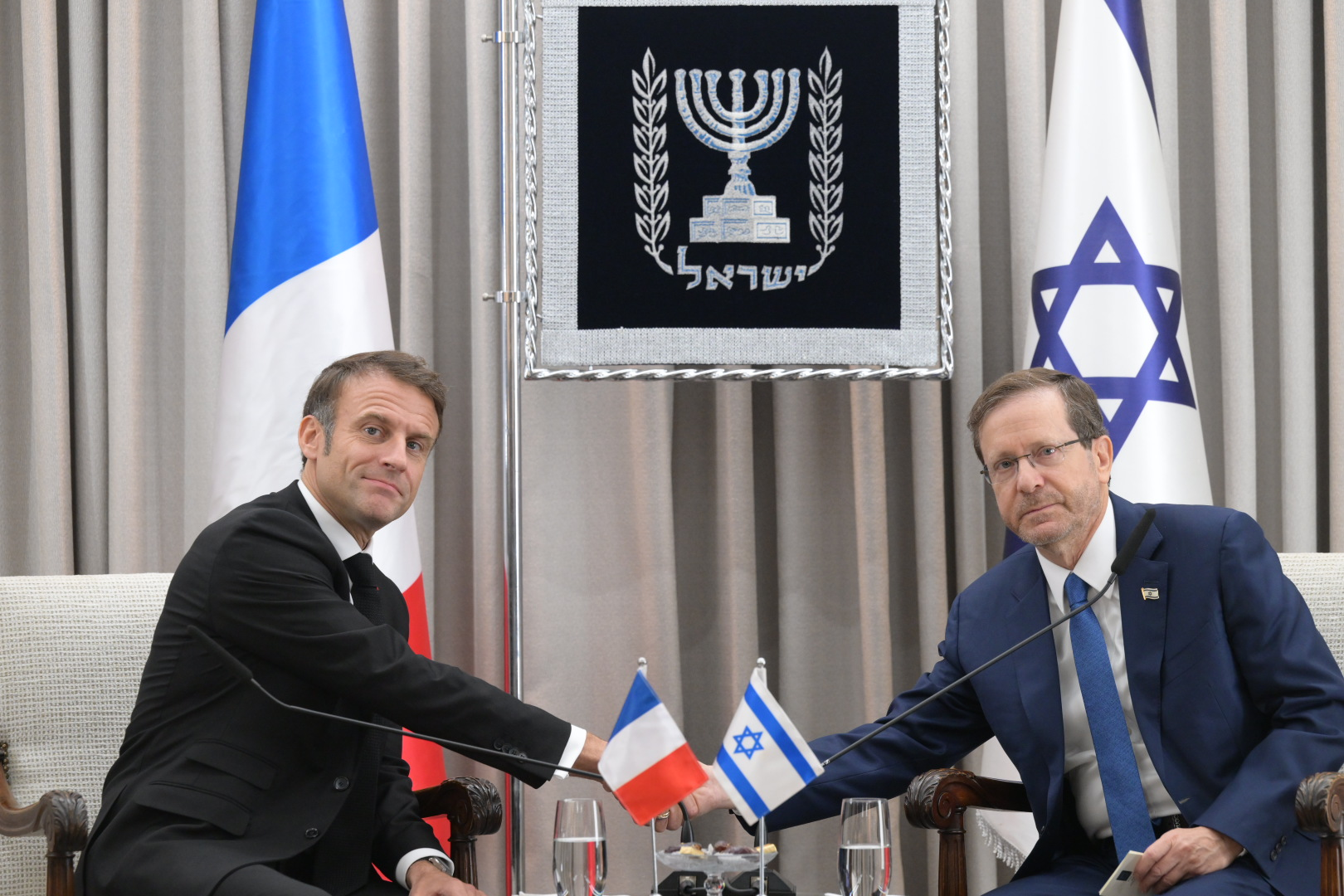
Macron meets with Israeli President Isaac Herzog in Jerusalem in October 2023

In June, Macron hosted a global climate finance conference. The purpose was to adjust the global economy to address climate change and hunger. One proposition was to offer low-income countries grants instead of credits so they can use their resource to stop climate change and poverty instead of repaying debt. Macron supported the idea, but a Ugandan climate activist remarked that the promises are senseless if, at the same time, Macron supported projects like the East African Crude Oil Pipeline, which he called a major threat to climate and to the drinking water of 40 million people. At the summit Macron proposed an international taxation system and debt restructuring but stressed that it would require international cooperation. In July, Macron had to postpone his planned state visit to Germany due to ongoing Nahel M. riots. This would have been the first state visit to Germany for a French head of state in 23 years.

On 13 July, the Parliament passed a multi-year military budget planning law for 2024–2030, allowing a 40% increase in military spending to a total of €413 billion over the period compared to 2019–2025.

In October, Macron condemned Hamas' attack on Israel and expressed his support for Israel's right to self-defense. He criticized Iran for its support of Hamas. On 24 October, Macron visited Israel to express solidarity with the country. He said that the anti-ISIL coalition should fight Hamas. On 10 November, he called for a ceasefire and urged Israel to stop bombing Gaza and killing civilians.

==== 2024 ====
In January, he accused Hamas of using Palestinian civilians as human shields and said Israel had the right to defend itself.

In February, during a meeting with other European states, Macron generated controversy by suggesting sending ground troops to Ukraine.

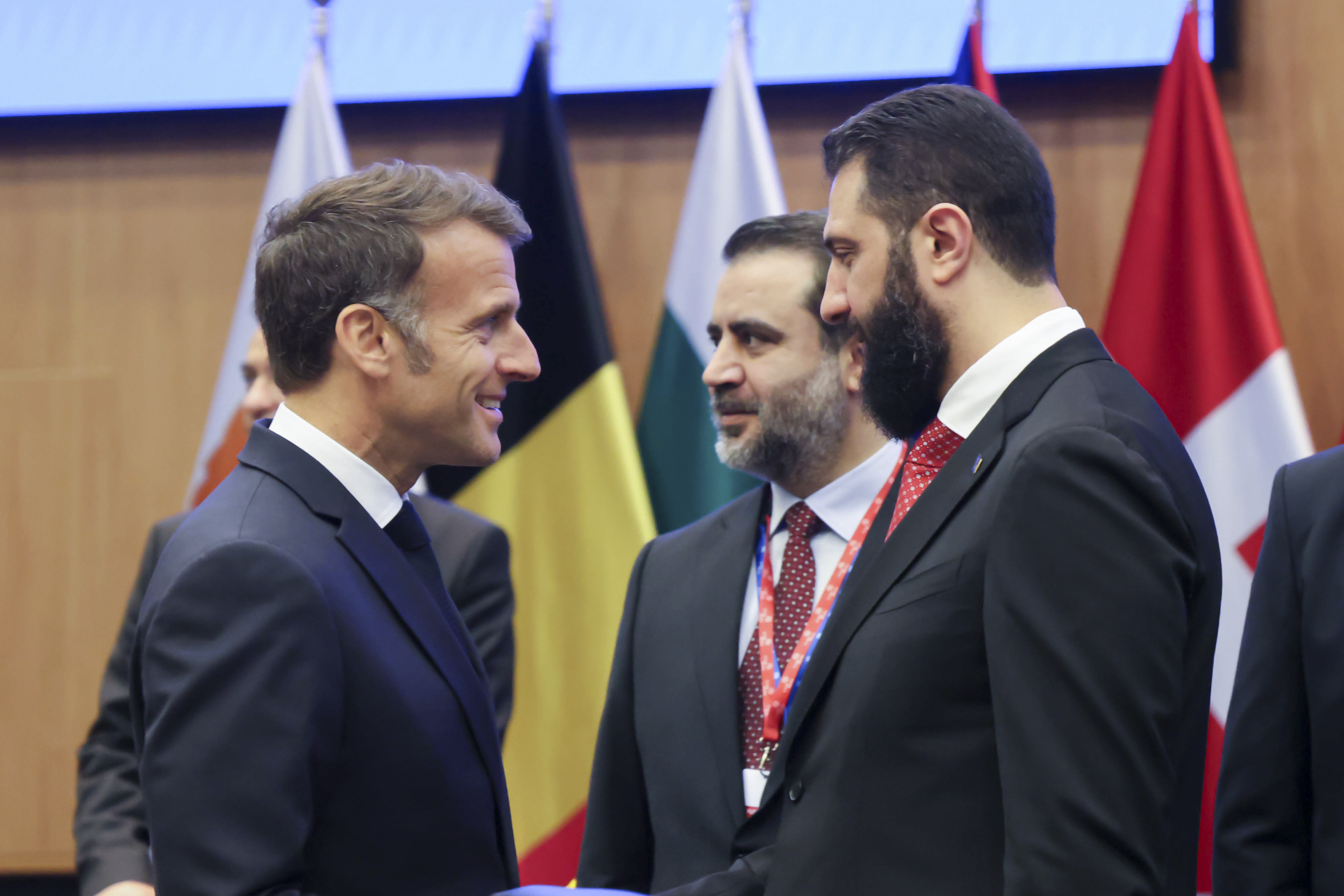
Macron, Syrian President Ahmed al-Sharaa and Syrian Foreign Minister Asaad al-Shaibani, 24 April 2026

In March, Macron defended the Comprehensive Economic and Trade Agreement (CETA) between Canada and the EU, praising the agreement as a "very good deal", after the French Senate voted against its ratification. In March, Macron and Brazilian president Luiz Inácio Lula da Silva agreed about cooperation between Brazil and France on environmental issues, including the transmission of 1.1 billion dollars for preserving the Amazon rainforest. On 28 May, Macron gave Ukraine permission to use SCALP EG missiles against limited targets on Russian soil. The missiles could target only "military sites from which missiles are being fired, military sites from which Ukraine is being attacked".

=== June 2024 legislative election ===
On 9 June, Macron made a national address stating that he had dissolved the French parliament and called for parliamentary elections, following exit polls indicating that the Renaissance party would be thumped by the National Rally party in the 2024 European Parliament election. He stated that the first round of national elections were scheduled for 30 June, with a second round on 7 July, advancing the date of elections from mid-2027. In his address, he called the rise of nationalism by agitators a threat to France and Europe. He also decried the far right as the "impoverishment of the French people and the downfall of our country". He called upon the French people to make the right choice for themselves and the future, calling the elections an "act of trust".

=== Economy (2024-2025) ===
Under Macron, France's budget situation has progressively worsened, with the budget deficit more than doubling from 2.6% in 2017 to 6.1% of GDP in 2024. France's public debt was 110.6% of GDP in 2023. Short-lived PM Michel Barnier's budget plan would have seen debt to GDP swell at around 116% in 2028 then fall slowly afterwards. Barnier's plan was conditioned on the deficit falling to 5% of GDP in 2025.

== Approval ratings ==
Approval and disapproval ratings of Macron

Macron started his five-year term with a 62-percent approval rating. This was higher than Hollande's popularity at the start of his first term (61 per cent) but lower than Sarkozy's (65 per cent). An IFOP poll on 24 June 2017 said that 64 per cent of French people were pleased with Macron's performance. In the IFOP poll on 23 July 2017, Macron suffered a 10-per-cent point drop in popularity, the largest for any president since Jacques Chirac in 1995. 54 per cent of French people approved of Macron's performance, a 24-point drop in three months. The main contributors were his confrontations with former Chief of Defence Staff Pierre de Villiers, the nationalization of the Chantiers de l'Atlantique shipyard owned by the bankrupt STX Offshore & Shipbuilding, and a reduction in housing benefit. In August 2017, IFOP polls stated that 40 per cent approved and 57 per cent disapproved of his performance.

By the end of September 2017, seven out of ten respondents said that they believe Macron was respecting his campaign promises, though a majority felt that the policies the government was putting forward were "unfair". Macron's popularity fell sharply in 2018, reaching about 25% by the end of November. Dissatisfaction with his presidency was expressed by protestors in the yellow vests (gilets jaune) movement. During the COVID-19 pandemic in France, his popularity increased, reaching 50% at highest in July 2020.

== Controversies ==
=== Benalla affair ===
On 18 July 2018, Le Monde reported that staffer Alexandre Benalla posed as a police officer and beat a protester during May Day demonstrations in Paris earlier in the year and was suspended for a period of 15 days before he was internally demoted. The government did not refer the case to the public prosecutor and a preliminary investigation was not opened until the day after the article. The lenient penalty raised questions within the opposition about whether the executive deliberately chose not to inform the public prosecutor as required under the code of criminal procedure.

== See also ==
- Presidency of Nicolas Sarkozy
- Presidency of François Hollande
- Political positions of Emmanuel Macron
- Foreign policy of Emmanuel Macron
- Presidency of Nicușor Dan
