= Presidency of François Hollande =

French presidential administration from 2012 to 2017

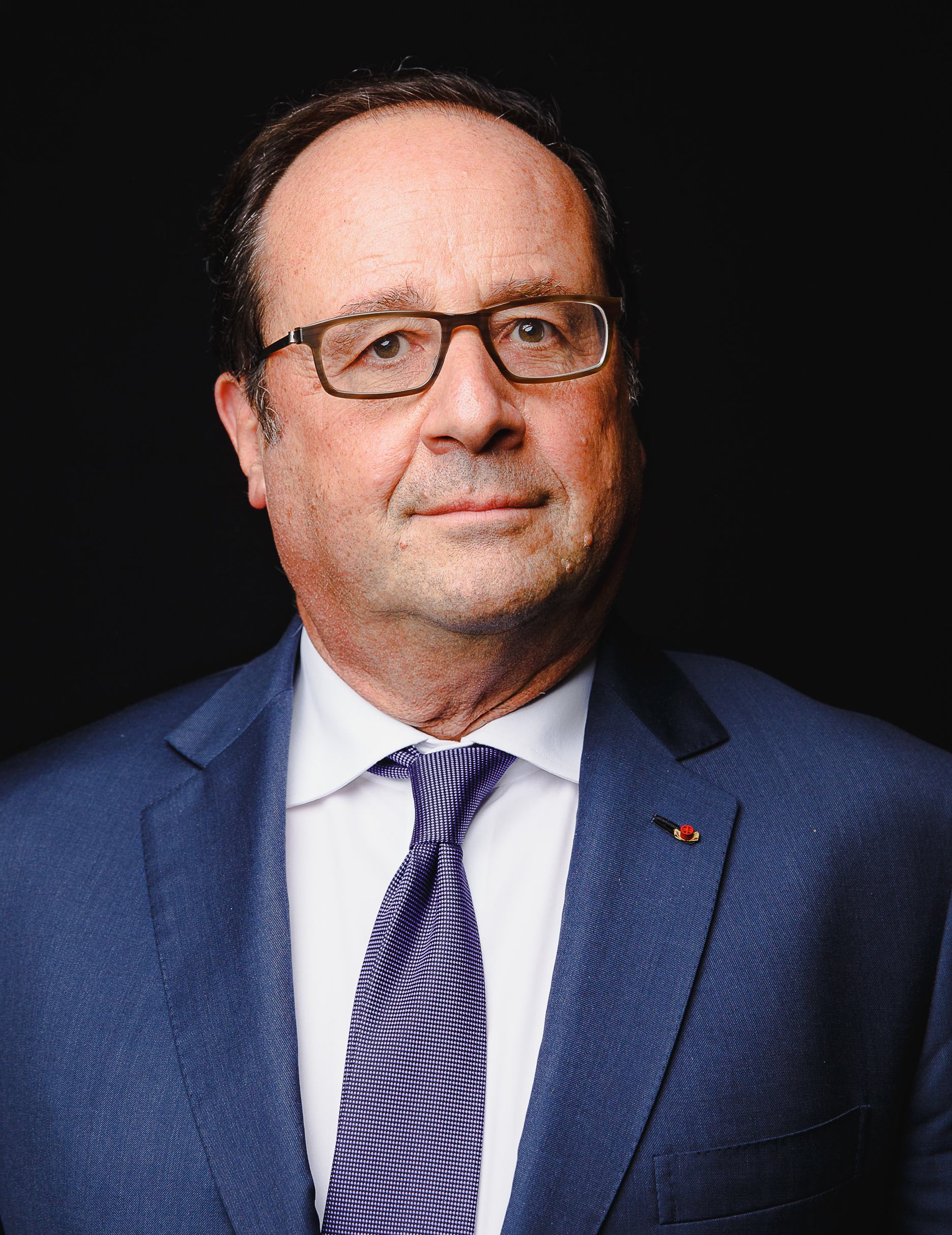
- Hollande in 2017
- Presidency of François Hollande; 15 May 2012 – 14 May 2017
- Cabinet: Ayrault government; First Valls government; Second Valls government; Cazeneuve government
- Party: Socialist
- Election: 2012
- Seat: Élysée Palace
- Standard of the President

The presidency of François Hollande began on 15 May 2012 when the Constitutional Council announced the official results from the presidential election during his inauguration and ended on 14 May 2017 when Emmanuel Macron was officially inaugurated as the 25th President of France. Hollande, a leader of the Socialist Party, worked alongside Prime Minister Jean-Marc Ayrault until 2014 then Manuel Valls until 2016 and finally Bernard Cazeneuve until the inauguration of Macron in 2017.

Hollande's presidency was dominated by the rising unemployment rate, the protests against reforms of the Labor code including the El Khomri law and the fight against Islamic Terrorism, mainly against the ISIS.

François Hollande declared in December 2016 that he was not going to run for a second term following low approval ratings. He was succeeded by former Minister of Economy, Emmanuel Macron.

== Domestic policy ==
=== Economy ===
The key economic focuses for François Hollande were the rising unemployment rate, income inequality and the deficit.

François Hollande said he underestimated the economic crisis when he first came into office, the first Budget of the Hollande presidency included several tax measures that were badly received mainly due to the increase in the taxation of capital gains. The increase meant that an entrepreneur who sold their company after 10 years would have to pay a 45 percent income tax rate, plus 15.5 percent in social contributions, so amounting to over 60 percent in tax. A movement labelled "les pigeons" was launched by entrepreneurs opposing the new tax measure. Hollande also abolished the increase on VAT that Sarkozy introduced though he later said that he regretted his decision.

A tax increase was introduced by Jean-Marc Ayrault to make up for the public deficit, the tax was estimated to create a revenue of 30 million euro a year, this was later reversed in favor of the creation of tax credits to make the economy more competitive. Eventually supply side economics was adopted by the government and taxation was lowered after poor performance and tax migration by individuals with higher incomes, including Bernard Arnault.

Employment was one of the key focuses for Hollande, he set an objective reversing the rising unemployment by the end of his first term. By the end of Hollande's term, unemployment had increased by 25%. By Q3 2015, unemployment was at the highest level in France since 1997. The Ayrault government put forward several plans to try to curb the youth employment including Law 2012-1189 which aimed to help young people with a lack of employment due to no training. This created the "emplois d'avenir" which gave young people between the ages of 16 and 25 contract ranging from one to three years in the public sector.

In March 2013, proposal no. 33 otherwise known as "contrat de génération" was introduced with the intention to find young people long-term contracts and make it easier for them to integrate into the labor market while securing the jobs of anyone above the age of 55. The proposal offered a €4000 subsidy to firms under 300 employees that employed anyone under the age of 26 without firing anyone over 57 while businesses with over 300 employees would need to produce a plan with the help of a trade union. The plan led to Disneyland Paris planning to hire over 600 under 26's by 30 September 2016 and Renault taking on 2000 young people a year under student contracts and 800 young people permanently. The proposal will cost €920,000 by 2016.

The El Khomri Law, which sought to make it easier for companies to lay off workers, reduce overtime payments for hours worked above the 35-hour work week and reduce severance payments that workers were entitled to if their company had made them redundant was passed in August 2016. The law was intended to make France's economy more competitive.

During the 2012 presidential election, Hollande said he wanted to reduce the government deficit to 3% of GDP by 2013. He attempted to do this by raising taxes and cutting public spending. In 2013, Hollande postponed the objective to 2014 following rising unemployment and slow growth. In 2014, Hollande announced a plan to reduce spending by 50 billion euros between 2015 and 2017. The draft budget for 2016, announced in October 2015, showed a continued freeze on the wage of civil servants, a decrease in grants to local and regional governments, a reduction in the public sector wage and a reduction in taxes for most tax brackets. The deficit reached 3.5% of GDP in 2015. The 2017 budget announced a target for the deficit to reach 2.7% of GDP. The government's fiscal oversight committee, The Council of Public Finances said this was "unlikely."

Even though Hollande criticised Sarkozy when Standard & Poor downgraded France's financial rating, agencies have repeatedly downgraded France's rating during Hollande's presidency. In 2012, Moody's downgraded France from Aa1 to Aaa with a negative outlook economically. S&P downgraded France in November 2013 from AA+ to AA. Fitch downgraded France to AA with a stable outlook in 2014. In 2015, Moody's downgraded France for a second time to Aa2.

=== Housing policy ===
In 2013, Hollande introduced proposal no. 22 better known as the Duflot Law. This proposal aimed to regulate the prices of rent and cap real estate fees. This was intended to stop properties in cities like Paris and Lyon from being highly priced. Rents following the Duflot Law were determined by decree and must be inferior by 20% to the market price. The Duflot Law was praised by the left in France but criticised by economists and property developers. Cécile Duflot later was replaced by Sylvia Pinel and a law superseding the Duflot Law was introduced named the Pinel Act in 2014. The Pinel Act is intended to encourage investment in new housing construction by offering investors a tax reduction of up to €63,000 on their personal income tax. The reduction in taxes on income is spread over 6 years, 9 years or 12 years and the construction must meet the energy and thermal regulations and economic standards.

In 2014, the number of house sales in France dropped to its lowest levels in 17 years.

In 2015, larger fines were introduced to landlords with housing that doesn't meet the regulations set by the government.

=== Education ===
Hollande promised during the 2012 presidential campaign to create 60,000 teaching jobs. Between 2012 and 2016, more than 40,000 teaching jobs have been created. In 2013, the Law on Higher Education and Research was introduced in an attempt to add more national limits to universities and to attempt to combat the lack of cooperation between the state and the universities. Hollande's government also attempted to reform the school time taken by students in an attempt to reduce the school load.

=== Healthcare ===
Hollande attempted to modernize France's healthcare system in January 2016 with the Minister of Social Affairs and Health Marisol Touraine proposing a new law to accomplish this. During Hollande's presidency, cigarette packages were also neutralized.

=== Justice ===
Christiane Taubira served as Minister of Justice from 2012 to 2016 and pushed through several reforms such as legalising same-sex marriage and putting France into a state of emergency.

In 2012, Priority Security Zones were created in France under Interior Minister Manuel Valls, these planned to restrict crime and add more security into communes where crime was more rampant. A study conducted found that drug trafficking, one of the main reasons these zones were created, were not affected by the establishment of the safe zones. There are 751 sensitive urban zones in France.

After the November 2015 Paris Attacks, 5,000 police jobs, 2,500 jobs within the state justice system and 1,000 immigration customs jobs were slated to be created within two years. Better equipment was also provided to police following the attacks.

=== Defense ===
During François Hollande's presidency, the French Armed Forces were planned to lose 34,000 jobs by 2019, until the November 2015 Paris Attacks where he increased the defence budget by 3.5 billion euros and 18,500 jobs were ultimately kept.

France exported more than 10 billion euros worth of weapons to Saudi Arabia in 2015, and has been labeled as the fourth biggest exporter of weapons globally.

Following the 2016 Nice Attacks, Hollande reestablished the French National Guard for the first time since 1872. The National Guard will serve as an operational reserve for both the army and the police.

France, then chaired by François Hollande, delivered tens of thousands of bombs to Saudi Arabia and the UAE in 2016. He affirmed that Paris authorized the delivery to the Saudi forces of 41,500 shells from the Junghas company (a subsidiary of the French industrial group, Thales), 3,000 anti-tank shells, 10,000 smoke shells, 50,000 high explosive shells and 50,000 rockets produced by Nexter to the Emirates.

== Social policy ==
=== LGBT rights ===
At the beginning of Hollande's term, same-sex marriage and adoption for LGBT couples were legalised after the longest parliamentary debate in the history of the Fifth Republic. The law was opposed by right wing protestors and lobbying was done to prevent the law to the Constitutional Council, though the challenge was rejected.

=== Women's rights ===
In 2012, at the start of his term, Hollande promised to lead a global fight to end violence against women. His government have been trying experiments to encourage gender equality, including teaching children in classrooms the "ABCD's of equality."

=== Pension reform ===
An announced plan in 2013 consists of a package of measures to revise the pension system. It aims to help with the estimated deficit of 20 billion euros by 2020. This is following a similar plan by François Fillion's government in 2010. Funds allocated to retirement homes were reduced by 200 million euros in 2017.

=== Immigration ===
Hollande's policies regarding immigration have been radically different to his predecessor Nicolas Sarkozy who threatened numerous times to remove France from the Schengen area. Hollande attempted to give foreigners the right to vote in local elections in 2012 but abandoned the plan in 2015. Hollande has said that France has a "problem with Islam" and that he thinks that is too much immigration.

Hollande proposed removing dual citizenship from terrorists though abandoned the plan after backlash within the Socialist Party.

== International policy ==
Hollande has been branded a neo-conservative due to his willingness to engage in Mali and in Syria though Hollande has intervened in foreign affairs less than Jacques Chirac or François Mitterrand. Hollande's diplomatic management has been compared to Nicolas Sarkozy's despite the differences in personality.

=== Withdrawal of troops from Afghanistan ===
Hollande pledged during the 2012 presidential campaign that he would start the withdrawal of French troops in Afghanistan. He began an early withdrawal in 2012 following a visit to Kabul where he addressed French soldiers and told them their "mission was finished. This was despite criticisms from several heads of state, including Prime Minister David Cameron.

=== Intervention in Mali ===
Military intervention in Mali was the first major intervention during François Hollande's presidency, the intervention began with Operation Serval on January 11, 2013. The intervention was launched in an attempt to stop the advance of Islamist insurgent groups who had taken most of the North of Mali and had begun to move towards the capital, Bamako. Operation Serval was completed on July 11, 2014. France began to withdraw its 3,000 troops in 2013 as an UN peacekeeping force was stationed in Mali.

Operation Barkhane was started on 1 August 2014 in an attempt to stop Islamic terrorism in the region after clearing insurgents from Mali.

=== Operation Sangaris ===
Hollande launched Operation Sangaris in December 2013 after international aid was requested by President François Bozizé following advance by Séléka, a rebel group that had been able to capture parts of the capital. In October 2013, the Central African Republic's state lost the ability to maintain order and the United Nations began to voice concerns of potential genocide.

In 2016, Operation Sangaris was ended and deemed a success with the government claiming that it had stopped the fighting in C.A.R.

=== Syria ===
François Hollande has been one of the biggest opponents against Bashar al-Assad. Hollande had been one of the biggest advocates for military intervention in Syria and in 2013 declared France ready to conduct air strikes against the Assad regime following the uses of chemical warfare during the Syrian Civil War though Barack Obama's final decision to not launch strikes against Syria left France diplomatically isolated and ultimately, the strikes weren't launched.

François Hollande has said that France supplied weapons to the Kurds and to the Syrian Rebels.

In April 2017, Hollande spoke in favor of Donald Trump's strikes against the Assad Regime after suspicions that the regime used chemical warfare against civilians.

== See also ==
- Presidency of Nicolas Sarkozy
- Presidency of Emmanuel Macron
- Politics of France
- Foreign policy of France

French Presidential Administrations
Preceded by Nicolas Sarkozy	Hollande Presidency; 2012–2017	Succeeded by Emmanuel Macron
