= NFP =

NFP may refer to:

== Political parties ==
- National Fascist Party, Italian Partito Nazionale Fascista
- National Federation Party, Fiji's oldest party
- National Freedom Party, South Africa
- New Frontier Party (Japan) (1994–1997), a "big tent" party
- New Popular Front (French: Nouveau Front populaire), a left-wing alliance in France

== Other organizations ==
- National Family Partnership, a US organization formerly known as the National Federation of Parents for Drug Free Youth
- Nebraskans For Peace
- Not-for-profit, nonprofit organizations
- Nurse-Family Partnership, a US non-profit organization that arranges home visits from nurses to mothers

== People ==
- Nadeem F. Paracha, Pakistani journalist and author

== Other uses ==
- Natural family planning, birth control methods
- Nonfarm payrolls, an economic indicator released monthly by the US Department of Labor
- Northern Ford Premiership, an English rugby league competition
- Net factor payments, an economic measurement, see factor income
- Netherlands Fractal Pattern, a Dutch military camouflage pattern
- Nintendo Figurine Platform, code name for the Amiibo toys-to-life platform

== See also ==
- National Front Party (disambiguation)
- New Frontier Party (disambiguation)
- Ninth Five-Year Plan (disambiguation)
- North Fork Pass (disambiguation)
