= North Fork Pass =

North Fork Pass may refer to:

== Mountain passes ==
- North Fork Pass (Alberta), a pass in Banff National Park, Alberta, Canada
- North Fork Pass (Alberta-British Columbia), a pass on the Continental Divide of the Americas between Alberta and British Columbia, Canada
- North Fork Pass (Yukon), a pass in Yukon, Canada

== See also ==
- NFP (disambiguation)
