= Ninth Five-Year Plan =

Ninth Five-Year Plan may refer to:

- The Ninth Five-Year Plan (People's Republic of China), began in 1996 and ended in 2000
- The Ninth Five-Year Plan (India), began in 1997 and ended in 2002
- The Ninth Five-Year Plan (Soviet Union), began in 1971 and ended in 1975
- The Ninth Five-Year Plan (Vietnam), began in 2006 and ended in 2010
