= New Frontier Party =

New Frontier Party may refer to:

- New Frontier Party (Japan) (Shinshinto) of Japan
- Liberty Korea Party (Saenuri Party, New Frontier Party) of South Korea
