= Presidential standard of France =

Flags used by the president of France

The presidential standard

The presidential standard of France refers to either one of two similar flags used by the president of France. Two versions of the flag exist: one for use on land and the other for use at sea.

Although almost universally called a standard, such flags when used in France are banners of arms, as they comprise the shield. However, that is not the case for the national emblem. Since 1995, the president has used the standard without any symbols on it.

The presidential standard is flown at the Élysée Palace, La Lanterne and Fort de Brégançon even when the president is not present.

When Philippe Pétain was chief of state of Vichy France, the presidential standard was adorned with the Order of the Francisque. Charles de Gaulle used a cross of Lorraine on the presidential standard as a symbolism of Free France. Valéry Giscard d'Estaing had the presidential standard with the fasces and François Mitterrand had the presidential standard with an oak tree.

== Presidential standards ==
Standard	President	Description
	Emmanuel Macron	A vertical tricolour of blue, white, and red (proportions 1:1).
	Emmanuel Macron	A vertical tricolour of blue, white, and red (proportions 2:3).

Historic

Standard	President	Description
	Jules Grévy	A vertical tricolour of blue, white, and red, proportions 1:1.
	Sadi Carnot	A vertical tricolour of blue, white, and red (proportions 1:1) with the golden "C".
	Jean Casimir-Perier	A vertical tricolour of blue, white, and red (proportions 1:1) with the golden "CP".
	Félix Faure	A vertical tricolour of blue, white, and red (proportions 1:1) with the golden "FF".
	Émile Loubet	A vertical tricolour of blue, white, and red (proportions 1:1) with the golden "EL".
	Armand Fallières	A vertical tricolour of blue, white, and red (proportions 1:1) with the golden "AF".
	Raymond Poincaré	A vertical tricolour of blue, white, and red (proportions 1:1) with the golden "RP".
	Paul Deschanel	A vertical tricolour of blue, white, and red (proportions 1:1) with the golden "PD".
	Alexandre Millerand	A vertical tricolour of blue, white, and red (proportions 1:1) with the golden "AM".
	Gaston Doumergue	A vertical tricolour of blue, white, and red (proportions 1:1) with the golden "GD".
	Paul Doumer	A vertical tricolour of blue, white, and red (proportions 1:1) with the golden "PD".
	Albert Lebrun	A vertical tricolour of blue, white, and red (proportions 1:1) with the golden "AL".
	Philippe Pétain	A vertical tricolour of blue, white, and red (proportions 1:1) with the axe and 7 golden stars.
	Philippe Pétain	A vertical tricolour of blue, white, and red (proportions 2:3) with the axe and 7 golden stars.
	Vincent Auriol	A vertical tricolour of blue, white, and red (proportions 1:1) with the golden "VA".
	René Coty	A vertical tricolour of blue, white, and red (proportions 1:1) with the golden "RC".
	Charles de Gaulle	A vertical tricolour of blue, white, and red (proportions 1:1) with the golden "CG" and the red Cross of Lorraine.
	Charles de Gaulle	A vertical tricolour of blue, white, and red (proportions 2:3) with the red Cross of Lorraine.
	Georges Pompidou	A vertical tricolour of blue, white, and red (proportions 1:1) with the golden "GP".
	Georges Pompidou	A vertical tricolour of blue, white, and red (proportions 2:3) with the golden "GP".
	Alain Poher	A vertical tricolour of blue, white, and red (proportions 1:1) with the golden "AP".
	Alain Poher	A vertical tricolour of blue, white, and red (proportions 2:3) with the golden "AP".
	Valéry Giscard d'Estaing	A vertical tricolour of blue, white, and red (proportions 1:1).
	Valéry Giscard d'Estaing	A vertical tricolour of blue, white, and red (proportions 2:3).
	Valéry Giscard d'Estaing	A vertical tricolour of blue, white, and red (proportions 1:1) with the golden fasces.
	Valéry Giscard d'Estaing	A vertical tricolour of blue, white, and red (proportions 2:3) with the golden fasces.
	François Mitterrand	A vertical tricolour of blue, white, and red (proportions 1:1) with the golden "FM".
	François Mitterrand	A vertical tricolour of blue, white, and red (proportions 2:3) with the golden "FM".
	François Mitterrand	A vertical tricolour of blue, white, and red (proportions 1:1) with the golden oak tree.
	François Mitterrand	A vertical tricolour of blue, white, and red (proportions 2:3) with the golden oak tree.
	Jacques Chirac	A vertical tricolour of blue, white, and red (proportions 1:1).
	Jacques Chirac	A vertical tricolour of blue, white, and red (proportions 2:3).
	Nicolas Sarkozy	A vertical tricolour of blue, white, and red (proportions 1:1).
	Nicolas Sarkozy	A vertical tricolour of blue, white, and red (proportions 2:3).
	François Hollande	A vertical tricolour of blue, white, and red (proportions 1:1).
	François Hollande	A vertical tricolour of blue, white, and red (proportions 2:3).

== Uses of standards ==
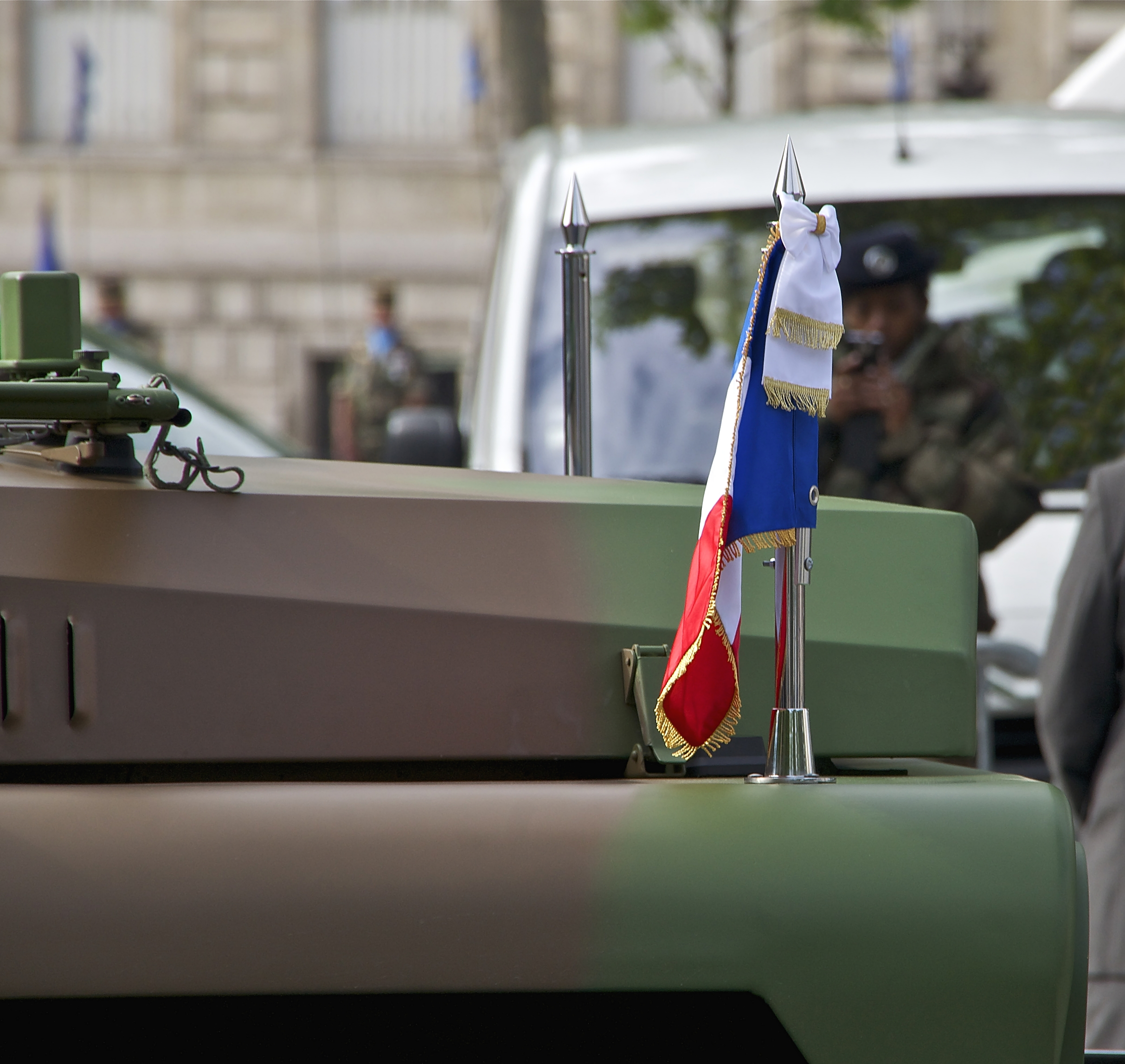
The presidential standard used on land.

The presidential standard is reserved only for the president, and is the most used. Those with a white bow signal the presence of the president at a residence, and is also used on official vehicles, but also on other road vehicles at home or abroad. The presidential standard is also flown from aircraft and water vessels. When the president is aboard a French naval ship, the flag is flown from the main mast of the ship and is lowered upon his/her departure. The flag is also draped over the coffin of the president upon his/her death.

== See also ==
- Flag of France
