= Coast guard =

Maritime security organization

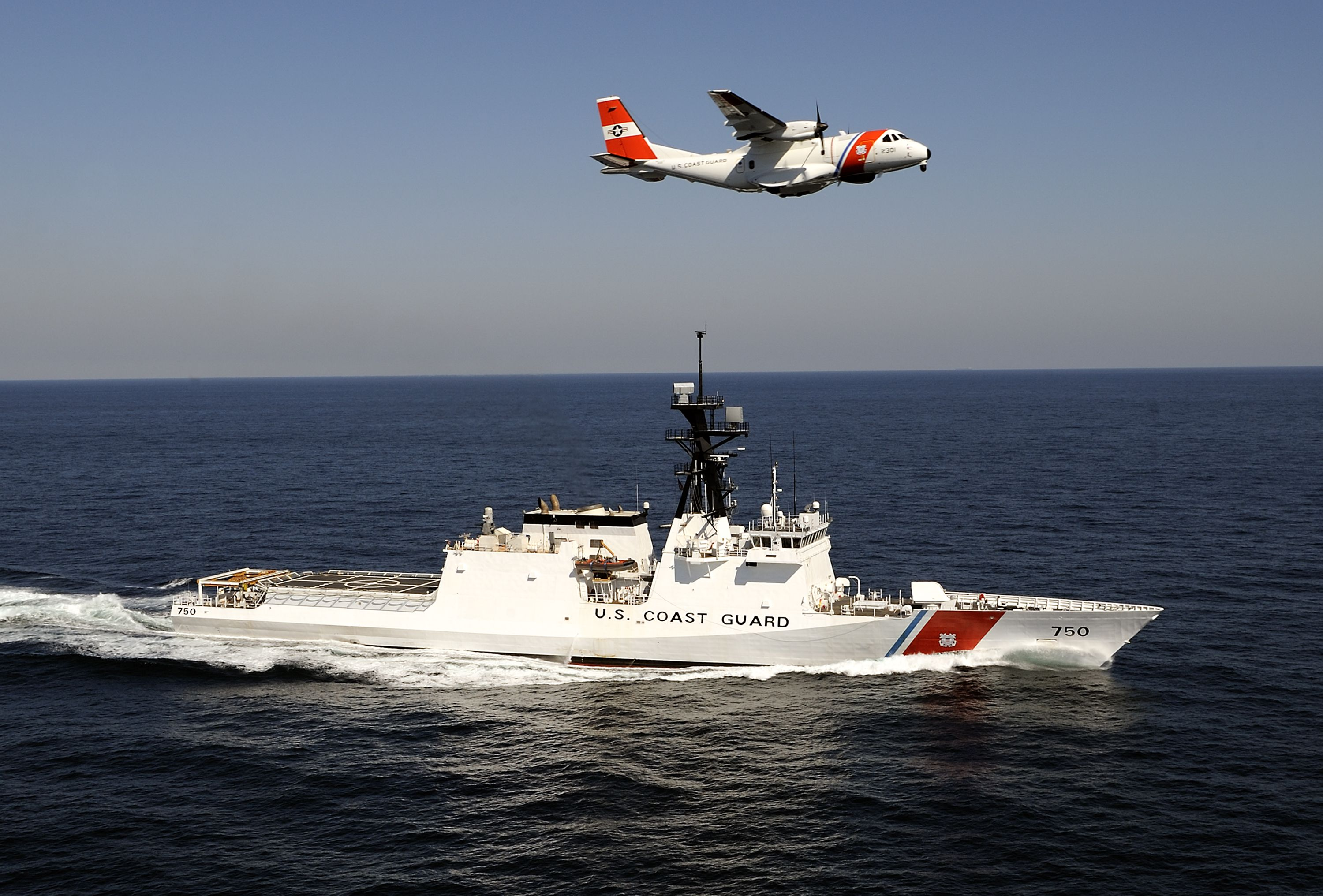
USCG National Security Cutter USCGC Bertholf (WMSL-750) and an EADS HC-144 Ocean Sentry

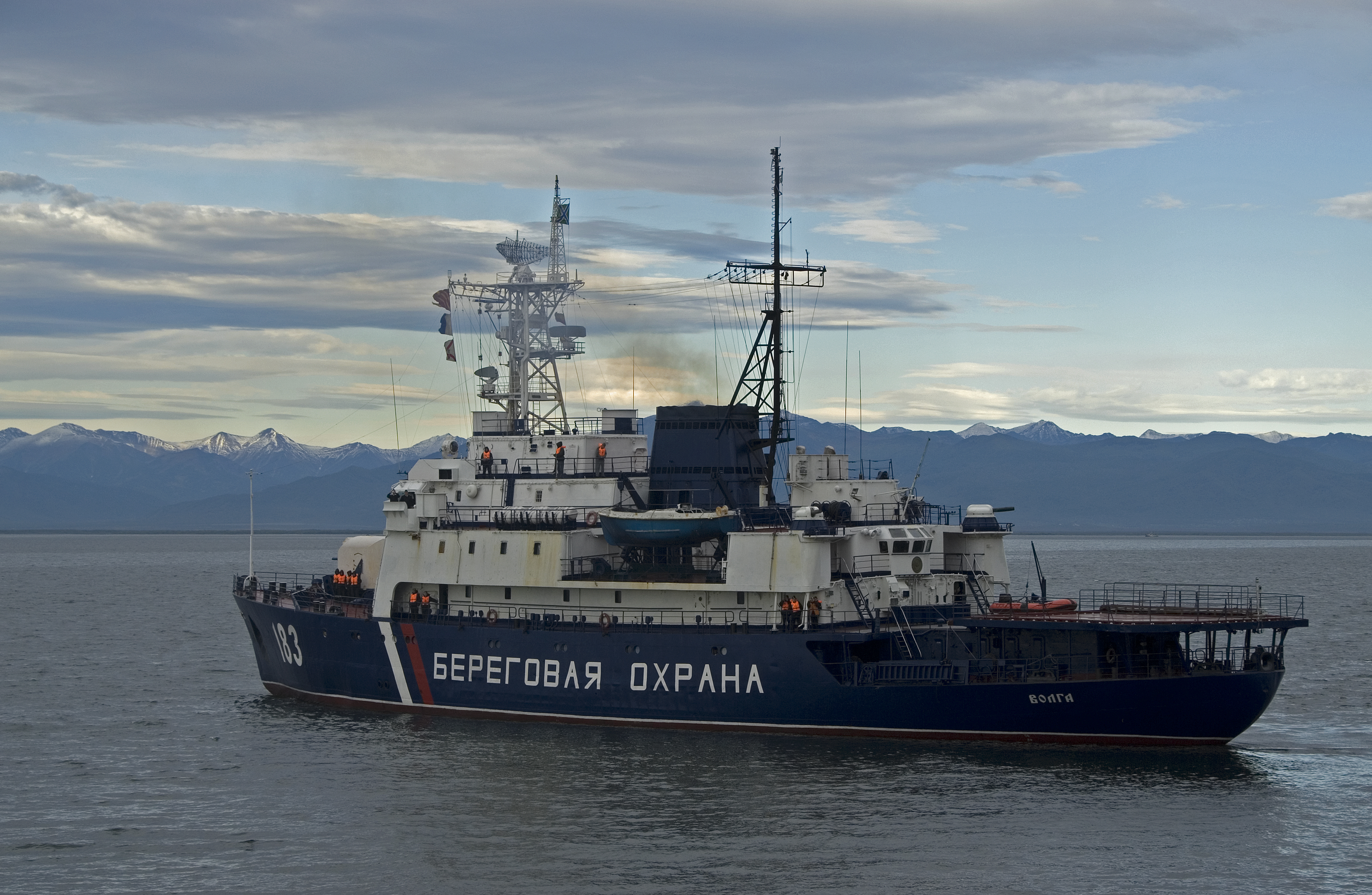
Russian Coast Guard ship #183 Volga

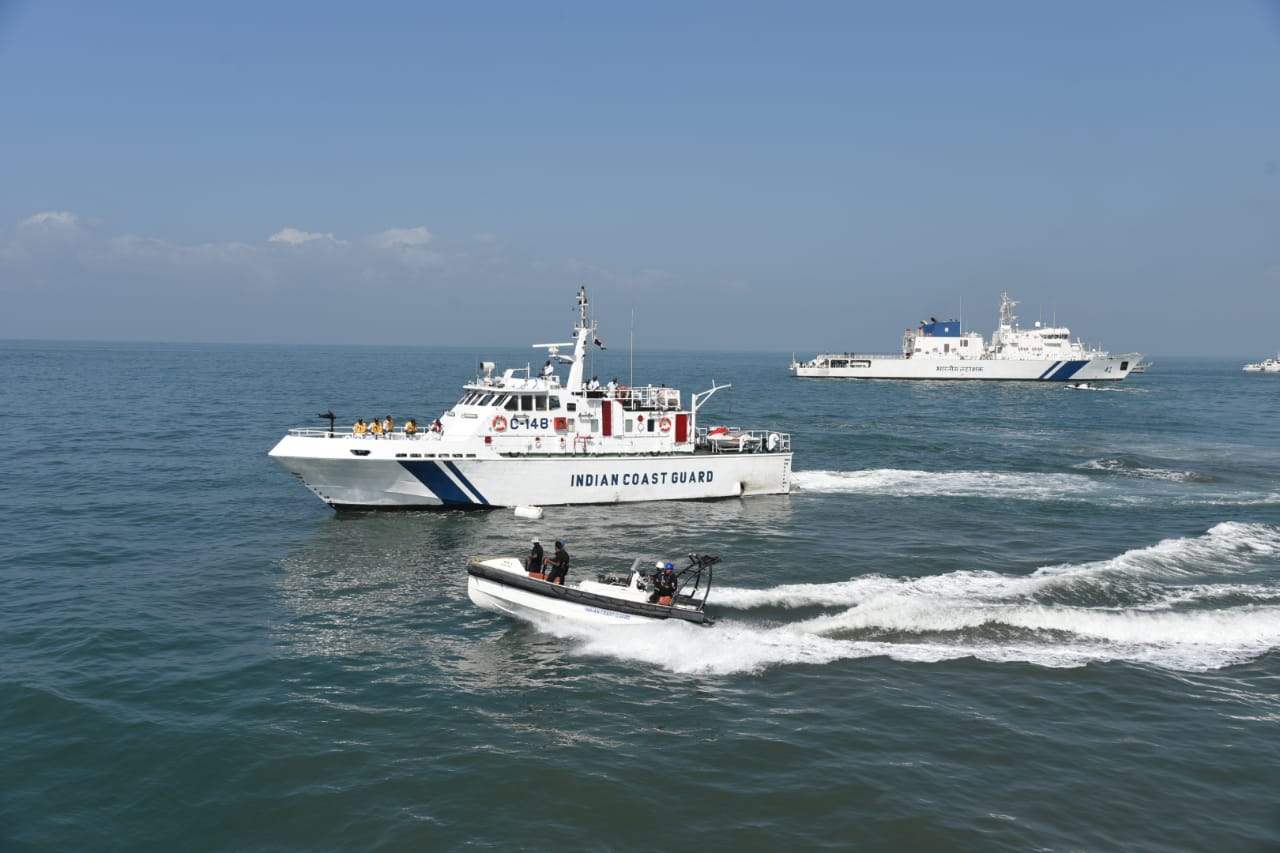
Fast Interceptor craft and Patrol vessels of the Indian Coast Guard

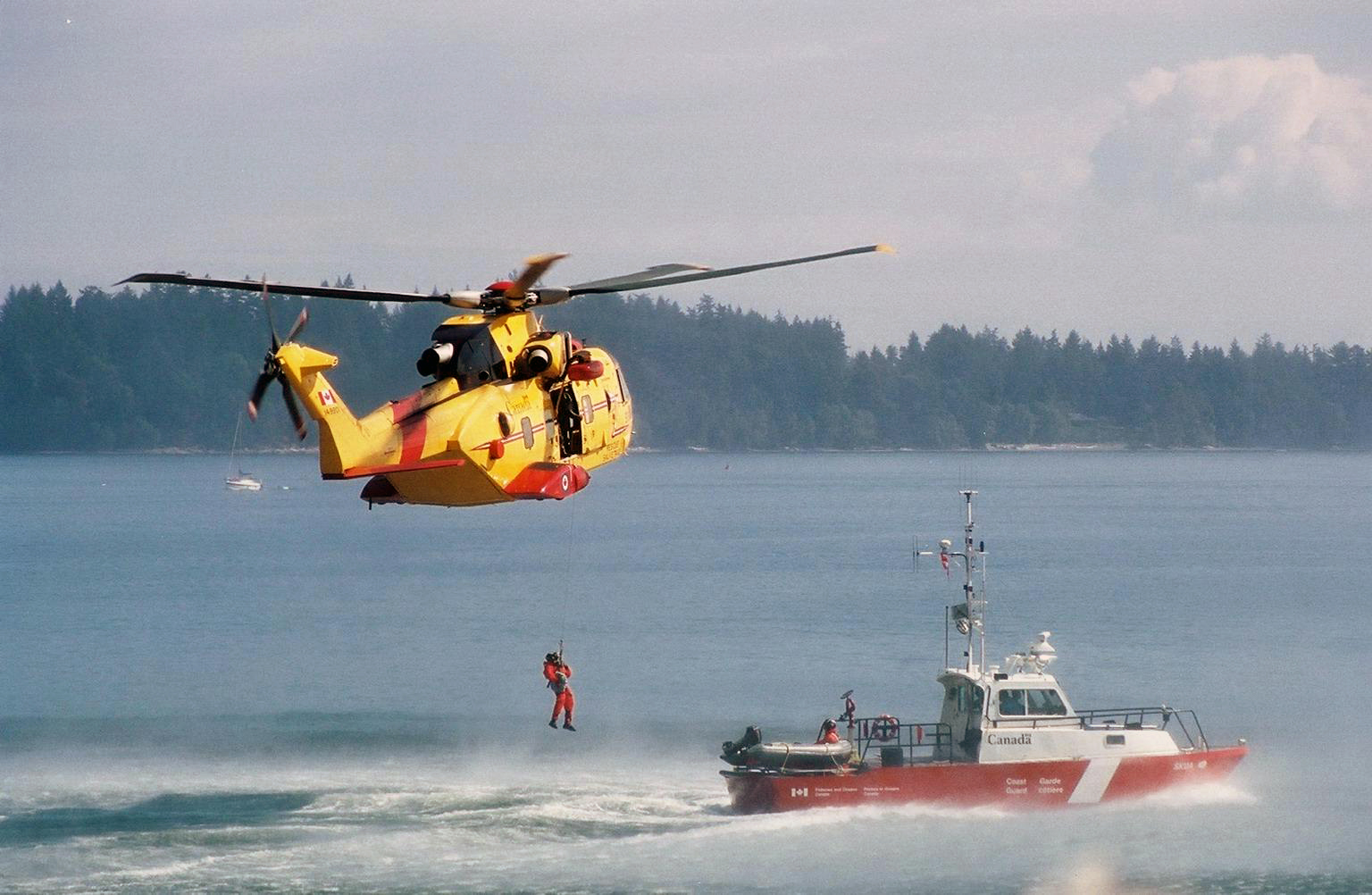
A CH-149 Cormorant training with a Canadian Coast Guard cutter

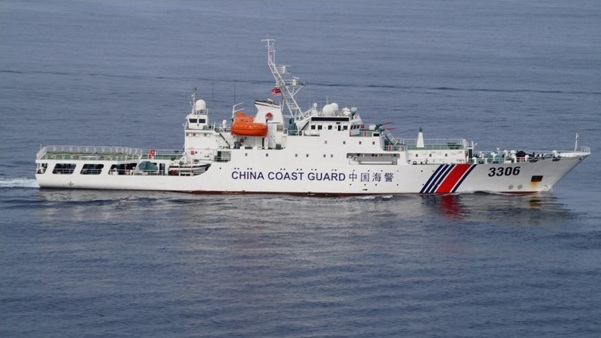
A China Coast Guard ship participating in an international exercise

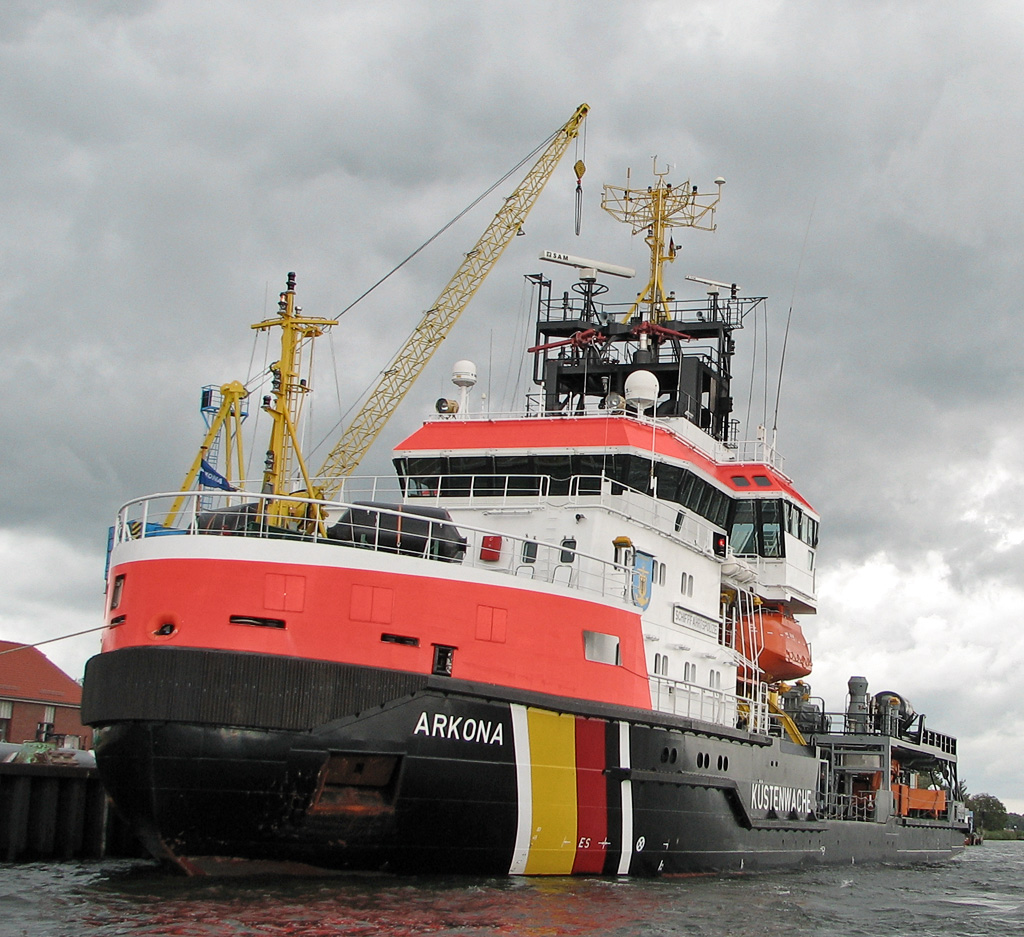
Multi-purpose vessel Arkona of the German Federal Coast Guard

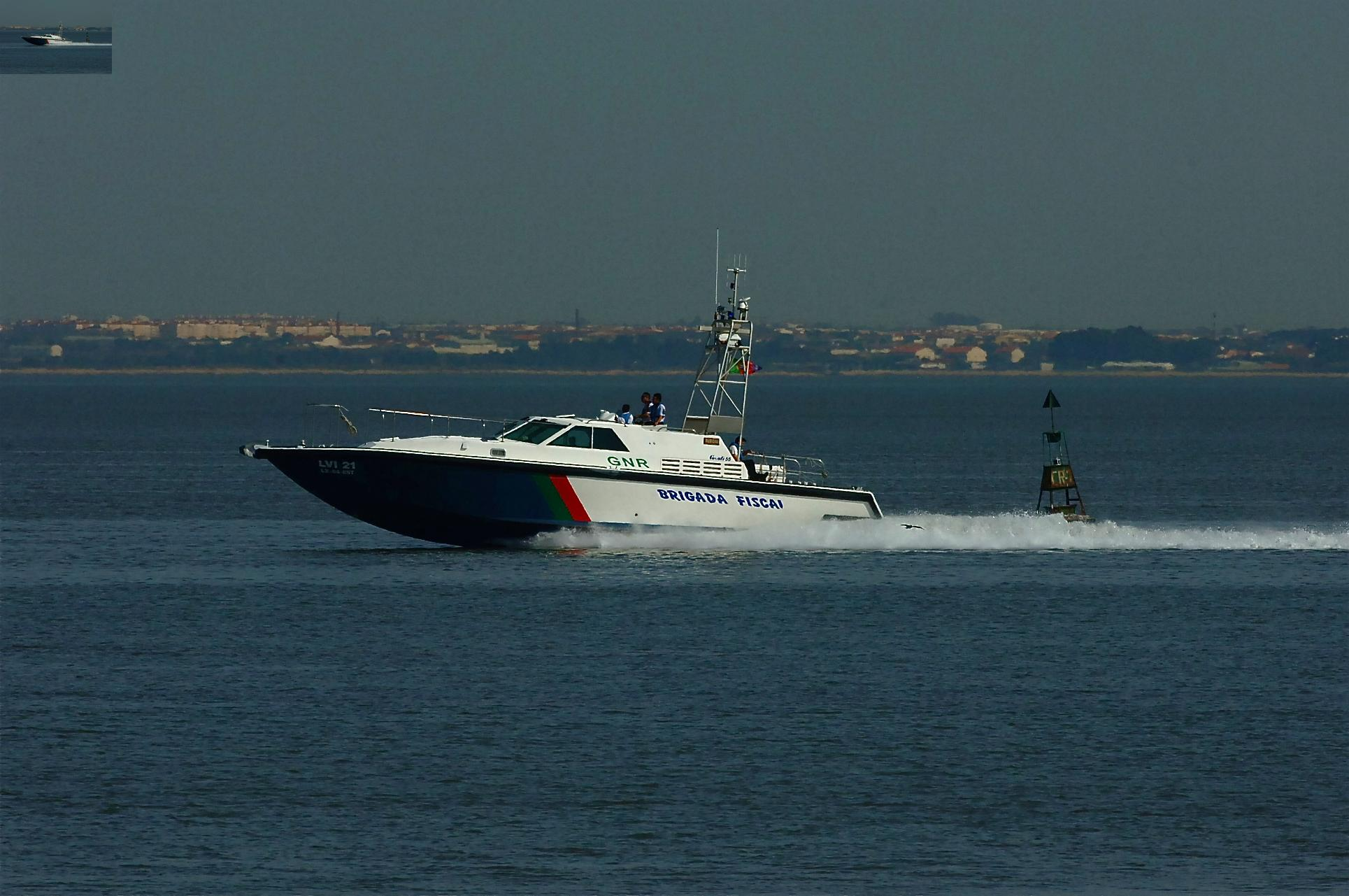
A Portuguese National Republican Guard Coastal Control Unit surveillance boat of the LVI type

A coast guard or coastguard is a maritime security organization of a particular country. The term embraces wide range of responsibilities in different countries, from being a heavily armed military force with customs and security duties to being a volunteer organization tasked with search and rescue without law enforcement authority. In most countries, a typical coast guard's functions are distinct from those of the navy (a military branch) and the water police (a law enforcement agency), while in certain countries they have similarities to both.

== History ==
=== United Kingdom ===
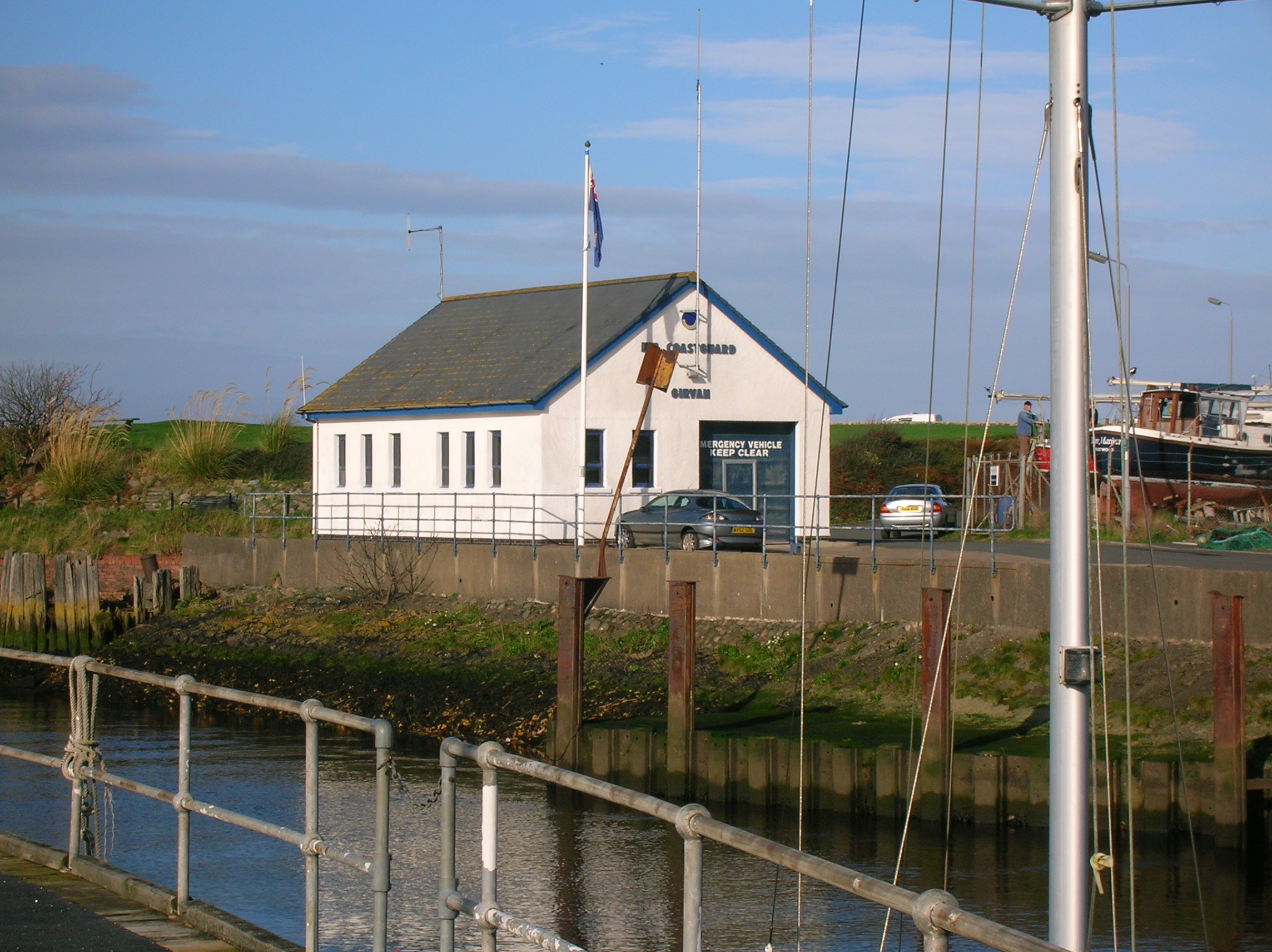
The HM Coastguard station at Girvan, Ayrshire, Scotland

The predecessor of Britain's modern HM Coastguard was established in 1809 as the Waterguard, a department of the HM Customs and Excise authority, which was originally devoted to the prevention of smuggling. At the time, due to high UK taxation on liquors such as brandy, as well as tobacco and other luxuries, smuggling of such cargos from places such as France, Belgium, and Holland was an attractive proposition for criminals. The barrels of brandy and other contraband were landed from the ships on England's beaches at night in small boats and later sold for profit, as later depicted in the Doctor Syn series of books by Russell Thorndike. The Coastguard was also responsible for giving assistance to shipwrecks.

Each Waterguard station was issued with a Manby mortar, which had been invented by Captain George William Manby in 1808. The mortar fired a shot with a line attached from the shore to the wrecked ship and was used for many years. This was the origin of the Coastguard's life saving role. In 1821 a committee of inquiry recommended that responsibility for the Preventative Waterguard be transferred to the Board of Customs. The Treasury agreed and (in a memorandum dated 16 January 1845) directed that the preventative services, which consisted of the Preventative Water Guard, cruisers, and riding officers should be placed under the authority of the Board of Customs and in future should be named the "Coastguard". In 1845 the Coastguard was subordinated to the Admiralty.

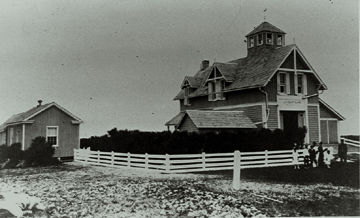
The Cape Hatteras Life-Saving Station, North Carolina, in use from the mid-19th century

In 1829 the first UK Coastguard instructions were published and dealt with discipline and directions for carrying out preventative duties. They also stipulated that, when a ship was wrecked, the Coastguard was responsible for taking all possible action to save lives, to take charge of the vessel and to protect property.

=== United States ===
In the United States, the United States Coast Guard was created in 1915 by the merger of two other federal agencies. The first, the United States Revenue Cutter Service, founded in 1790 and known until 1894 as the United States Revenue-Marine, was a maritime customs enforcement agency that also assumed a supporting role to the United States Navy in wartime. The second, the United States Life-Saving Service, was formed in 1848 and consisted of life saving crews stationed at points along the United States East Coast. The Coast Guard later absorbed the United States Lighthouse Service in 1939 and the functions of the Bureau of Navigation and Steamboat Inspection via a two-step process in 1942 and 1946.

== Role ==
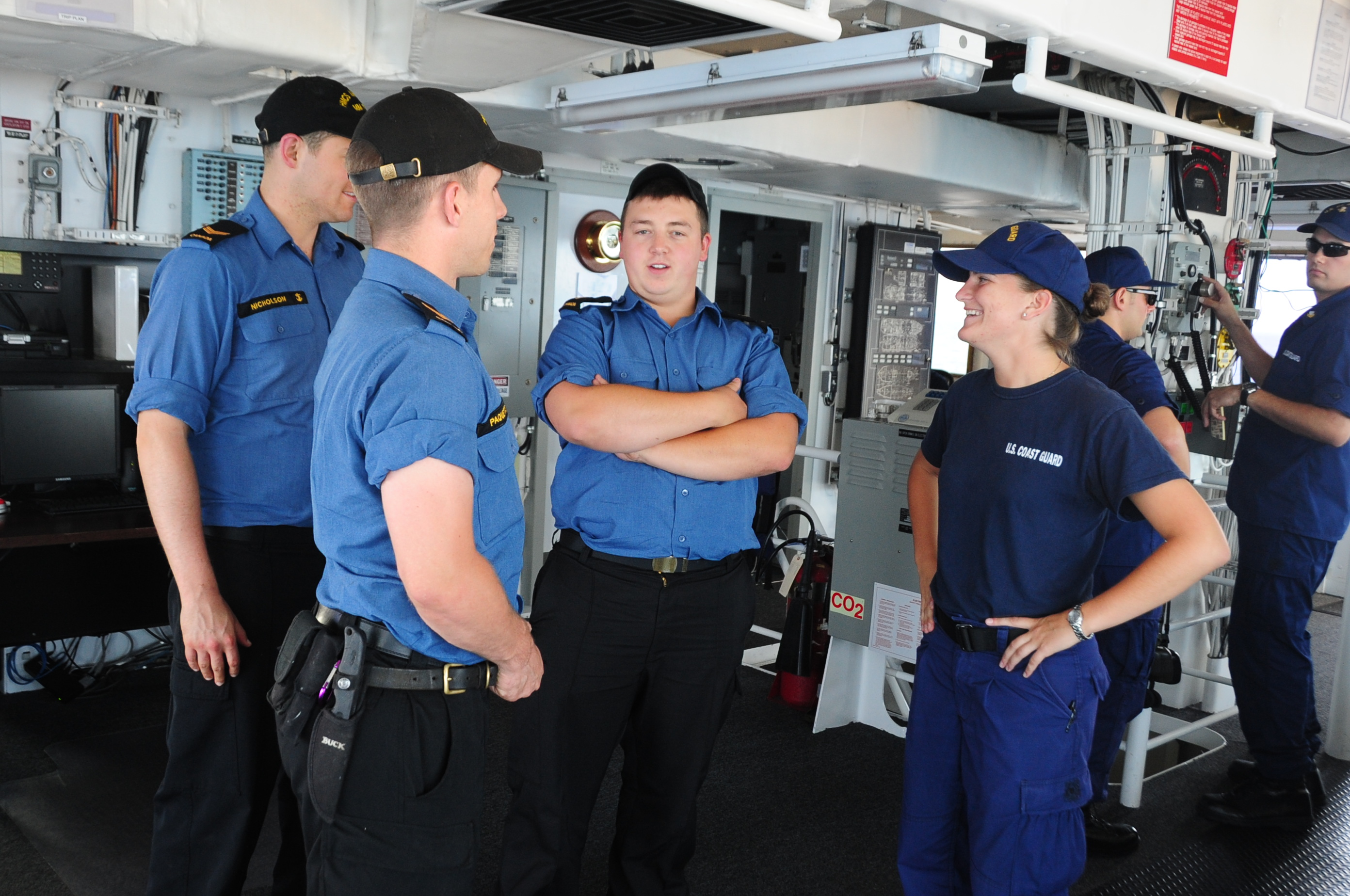
U.S. Coast Guardsmen and Royal Canadian Navy sailors, on the left, working together in 2012

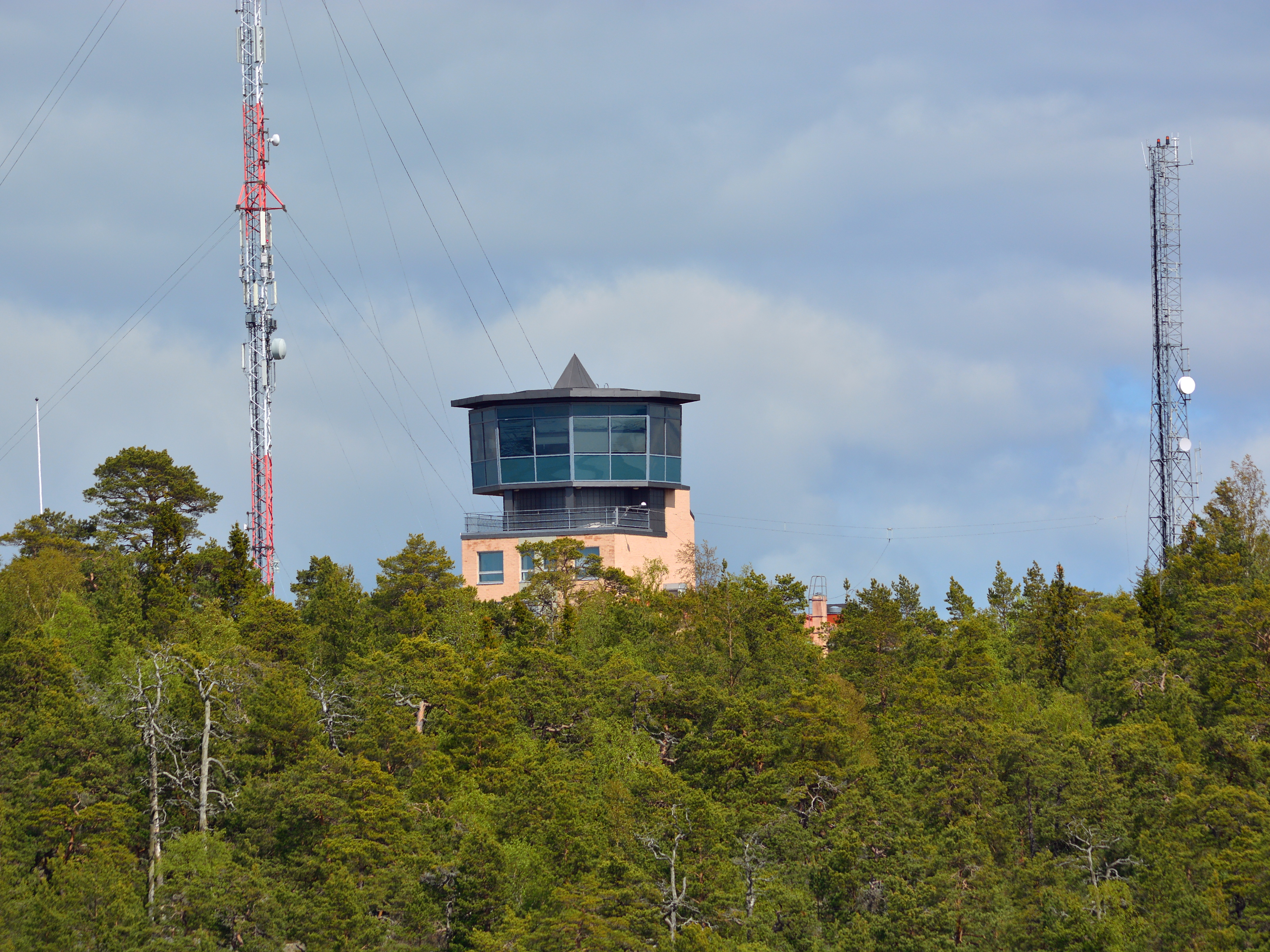
Coast Guard Station in Mariehamn, Åland

Among the responsibilities that may be entrusted to a coast guard service are:

- search and rescue,
- enforcement of maritime law,
- safety of vessels,
- maintenance of sea marks, and
- border control.

During wartime, some national coast guard organisations might have a role as a naval reserve force with responsibilities in harbor defenses, port security, naval counter-intelligence and coastal patrols.

The coast guard may, varying by jurisdiction, be a branch of a country's military, a law enforcement agency, or a search and rescue body. For example, the United States Coast Guard is a specialized military branch with law enforcement authority, whereas the United Kingdom's His Majesty's Coastguard (HMCG) is a civilian organisation whose primary role is search and rescue. Most coast guards operate ships and aircraft including helicopters and seaplanes that are either owned or leased by the agency in order to fulfil their respective roles.

Some coast guards, such as the Irish Coast Guard, have only a very limited law enforcement role, usually in enforcing maritime safety law, such as by inspecting ships docked in their jurisdiction. In cases where the coast guard is primarily concerned with co-ordinating rather than executing rescue operations, lifeboats are often provided by civilian voluntary organisations, such as the Royal National Lifeboat Institution in the United Kingdom and Ireland, whilst aircraft may be provided by the countries' armed forces, such as the search and rescue Sea Kings formerly operated by the Royal Air Force and Royal Navy, in addition to any of the HMCG's own helicopters.

== Racing stripes ==
Beginning in 1964 with the United States Coast Guard, many coast guards around the world have adopted high visibility color schemes to differentiate their coast guard vessels from the vessels of their respective navies. A frequent element is a high contrast "racing stripe" on the outer hull. While no international agreement exists to adopt it as a uniform marking, the 2009/2010 edition of Jane's Fighting Ships showed 61 nations had adopted some form of this stripe pattern for their coastal patrol and rescue vessels.

== List of coast guards by country ==
The following lists a selected number of coast guards around the world, illustrating the varied roles they play in the respective governments and the countries they operate in:

=== Argentina ===
The Argentine Naval Prefecture, in Spanish Prefectura Naval Argentina or PNA, is a service of the Argentine Republic's Ministry of National Security, charged with protecting the country's rivers, lakes and maritime territory. It therefore fulfills the functions of other countries' coast guards, and furthermore acts as a gendarmerie force policing navigable rivers and lakes. They belonged to the Ministry of Defence until the 1980s, and the corps' highest official was a Navy rear-admiral. They have since been transferred to the Ministry of Interior and, more recently, to the newly created Ministry of National Security. However, in the case of armed conflict, they can be put under the Navy's command.

=== Australia ===
Responsibilities for traditional coast guard duties in Australia are distributed across various federal, state and community volunteer agencies.

==== Federal ====
- The Maritime Border Command is the de facto coast guard of Australia. The Maritime Border Command is a joint unit of the Australian Defence Force (the Royal Australian Navy Patrol Force and the Royal Australian Air Force Surveillance and Response Group) and the Australian Border Force (Marine Unit and Coastwatch aircraft). It is responsible for border protection in the exclusive economic zone of Australia and its 19,650 kilometres of coastline and issues such as illegal fishing and exploitation of natural resources, maritime terrorism and piracy, biosecurity threats, and marine pollution.
- The Australian Maritime Safety Authority is responsible for maritime safety and seaworthiness of Australian and foreign vessels in Australian waters including compulsory pilotage, aids to navigation, the Australian Rescue Coordination Centre and coordination of search and rescue operations, and management of Australia's international maritime obligations.
- The Australian Fisheries Management Authority is responsible for the management and sustainable use of fisheries resources and for combating illegal fishing activities in the Australian Fishing Zone.
- The Australian Federal Police supports the Maritime Border Command and particularly the Australian Border Force with criminal investigations, law enforcement and national security matters.
- The Office of Transport Security has various responsibilities for maritime security.

==== State ====
Each State Government also has agencies with coast guard responsibilities. For example, in Queensland, Maritime Safety Queensland is responsible for maritime safety and the Queensland Police Service has a water police unit for law enforcement along the coastline, in waterways, and for Queensland islands.

==== Community ====
In addition, there are several private volunteer coast guard organizations, the two largest organizations being the Royal Volunteer Coastal Patrol (established in 1937) and the Australian Volunteer Coast Guard (established in 1961). These volunteer organizations have no law enforcement powers, and are essentially auxiliary Search and Rescue services. In NSW these two organisations have joined to become Marine Rescue New South Wales (MRNSW) in 2009.

=== Bangladesh ===
The Bangladesh Coast Guard (Bengali transliteration: বাংলাদেশ কোস্ট গার্ড; translated from English: বাংলাদেশ উপকূল রক্ষক); BCG is the maritime law enforcement force of Bangladesh. It is a paramilitary force which is under the jurisdiction of the Ministry of Home Affairs. Its officers are transferred from the Bangladesh Navy. The Bangladesh Coast Guard also performs the duty of maritime border security of Bangladesh. The headquarters is located in Dhaka, Bangladesh. Currently the coast guard has 3,339 personnel

=== Barbados ===
The Barbados Coast Guard (BCG) is the maritime element of the Barbados Defence Force, thus functioning as the navy of Barbados. Its responsibilities and duties include patrolling territorial waters and the exclusive economic zone (EEZ) of Barbados, territorial defence through marine means, counter-narcotics operations, and conducting maritime law enforcement operations.

=== Belize ===
The Belize Coast Guard (BCG) mission includes maritime safety, maritime security, marine resources protection, maintaining sovereignty over Belize sea space, and naval defence of Belize.

Coast Guard men and women are deployed around the clock patrolling the internal waters and territorial seas. On the northern frontier, their joint operating base at Consejo protects the local economy from the negative impacts of illegal contraband and acts as the northern cut off for drug trafficking. On their southern boundary they stand guard at the Sarstoon river ensuring sovereignty and territorial integrity of Belize. Their motto is Utrinque Paratus (Ready for Anything).

The Coast Guard Service coordinates its activities with the Belize Defence Force and the Belize Police Department.

=== Bosnia and Herzegovina ===
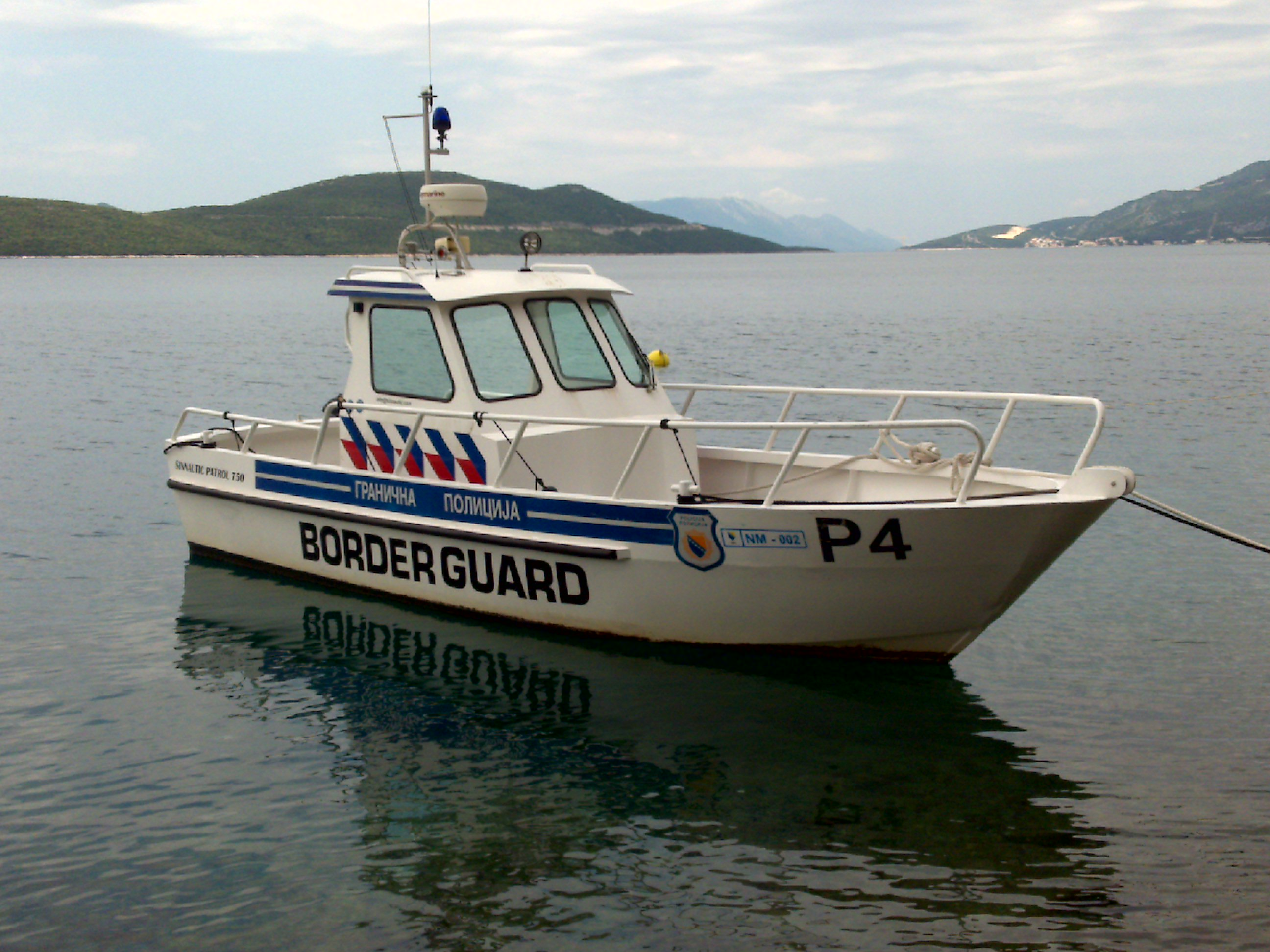
Bosnia and Herzegovina Granična policija surveillance boat (unit P4)

Having 18 kilometres of coastline only, Bosnia and Herzegovina does not have a force dedicated to defend its coast. The duty of patrolling its coastline falls to the Гранична_полиција_Босне_и_Херцеговине (English: Border Police).

=== Brazil ===
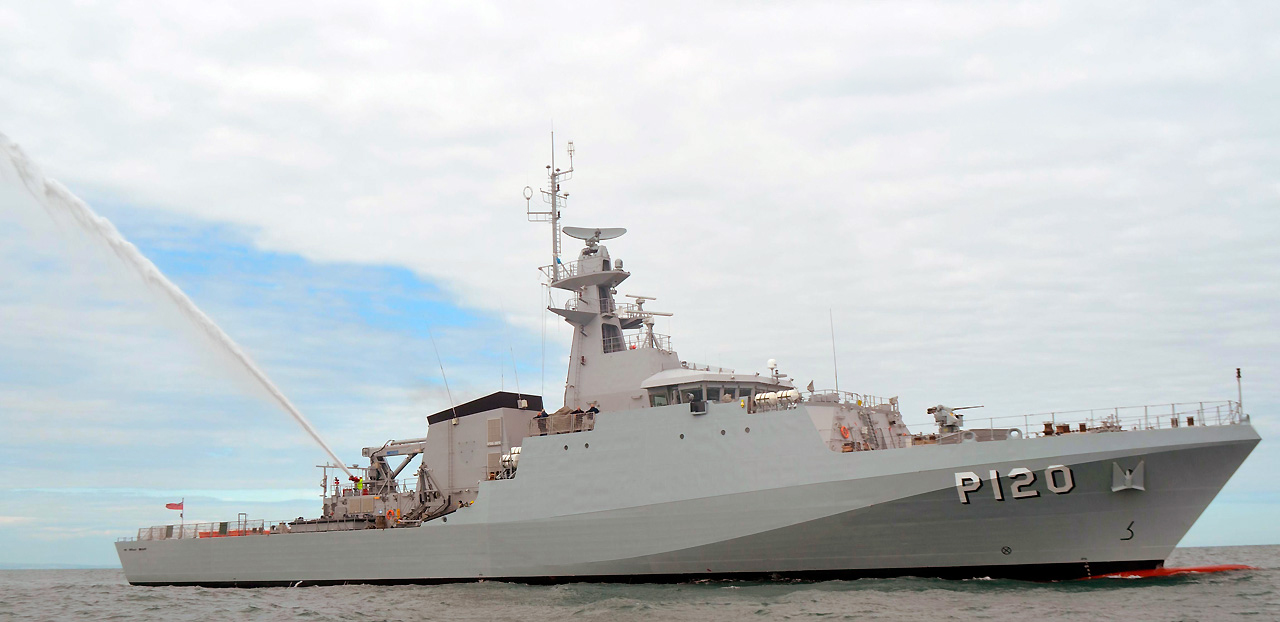
Brazilian coastguard ship

In addition to the roles of a traditional navy, the Brazilian Navy also carries out the role of organizing the merchant navy and other operational safety missions traditionally conducted by a coast guard. Other roles include: Conducting national maritime policy, and implementing and enforcing laws and regulations with respect to the sea and inland waters.

=== Canada ===
The Canadian Coast Guard (CCG) is a civilian service under the Department of National Defence responsible for patrolling the world's longest coastline of 243,042 km (~151,000 mi).

The CCG holds responsibility for all marine search and rescue throughout Canada. The CCG coordinates search and rescue operations with the Canadian Armed Forces, Royal Canadian Mounted Police (RCMP), and other organizations. The CCG maintains and operates seamarks, coastal light stations, vessel traffic services, marine pollution response services, marine communications systems, and provides icebreaking services. The CCG also operates all Federal scientific research and hydrographic survey vessels. To accomplish these tasks, the CCG has a sizable fleet of vessels and aircraft, all serviced from various bases and smaller stations located on three coasts (Atlantic, Arctic, Pacific) and the Great Lakes and St. Lawrence River.

The Canadian Coast Guard Academy is located near Sydney, Nova Scotia.

=== China ===
The China Coast Guard (CCG) (Chinese: 中国海警) serves as a coordinating body for maritime search and rescue in the territorial waters of the People's Republic of China. It was formed on 2013 as an amalgamation of four agencies: the Public Security Border Troops under the Ministry of Public Security, China Maritime Safety Administration, China Marine Surveillance, and China Fisheries Law Enforcement Command. In March 2018, it was placed under the leadership of the People's Armed Police, which is under the direct command of the Central Military Commission (CMC).

==== Hong Kong ====
In Hong Kong, law enforcement duties are carried out by the Marine Region of the Hong Kong Police Force and the Customs and Excise Department (Ports and Maritime Command of the Boundary and Ports Branch). The Hong Kong Maritime Rescue Co-ordination Centre (HKMRCC) co-ordinates search and rescue vessels, aircraft and other resources of the Fire Services Department, Government Flying Service, Marine Department and the Marine Police.

==== Macau ====
In Macau, coast guard responsibilities fall under the purview of the Macau Customs Service, which is in charge of conducting coast guard duties.

The Marine and Water Bureau, which is under the Secretariat for Transport and Public Works, helps in coordinating search and rescue operations in the region. It is done via the Search and Rescue Coordination Centre, formed under the Vessel Traffic Control Centre of Macau (Macao VTS).

=== Croatia ===
The Croatian Coast Guard (Croatian: Obalna straža Republike Hrvatske) is a division of the Croatian Navy responsible for protecting the interests of the Republic of Croatia at sea. The Croatian Navy is composed of classical naval forces structured into a flotilla and the Coast Guard that solely consists of ships with peacetime duties, e.g. protection of ecology, fishing, control of tankers, ballast waters, combat against terrorism, trafficking of people, narcotics, and similar.

On September 13, 2007, the Croatian Parliament passed a bill establishing the Croatian Coast Guard. The Coast Guard's mission is protect sovereign rights and carry out Croatia's jurisdiction in the Ecological and Fisheries Protection Zone, the continental shelf and the high seas. The Coast Guard will also monitor vessels sailing in the Croatian territorial waters. If vessels are caught violating Croatian or international regulations and disregard warnings by the Coast Guard, Coast Guard ships and airplanes are authorized to pursue them and if necessary open fire, while taking care not to jeopardize the lives of the vessel's crew.

Under the law, the commander of the Coast Guard is a Navy officer who is appointed and relieved of duty by the president of the republic at the government's proposal.

=== Cyprus ===
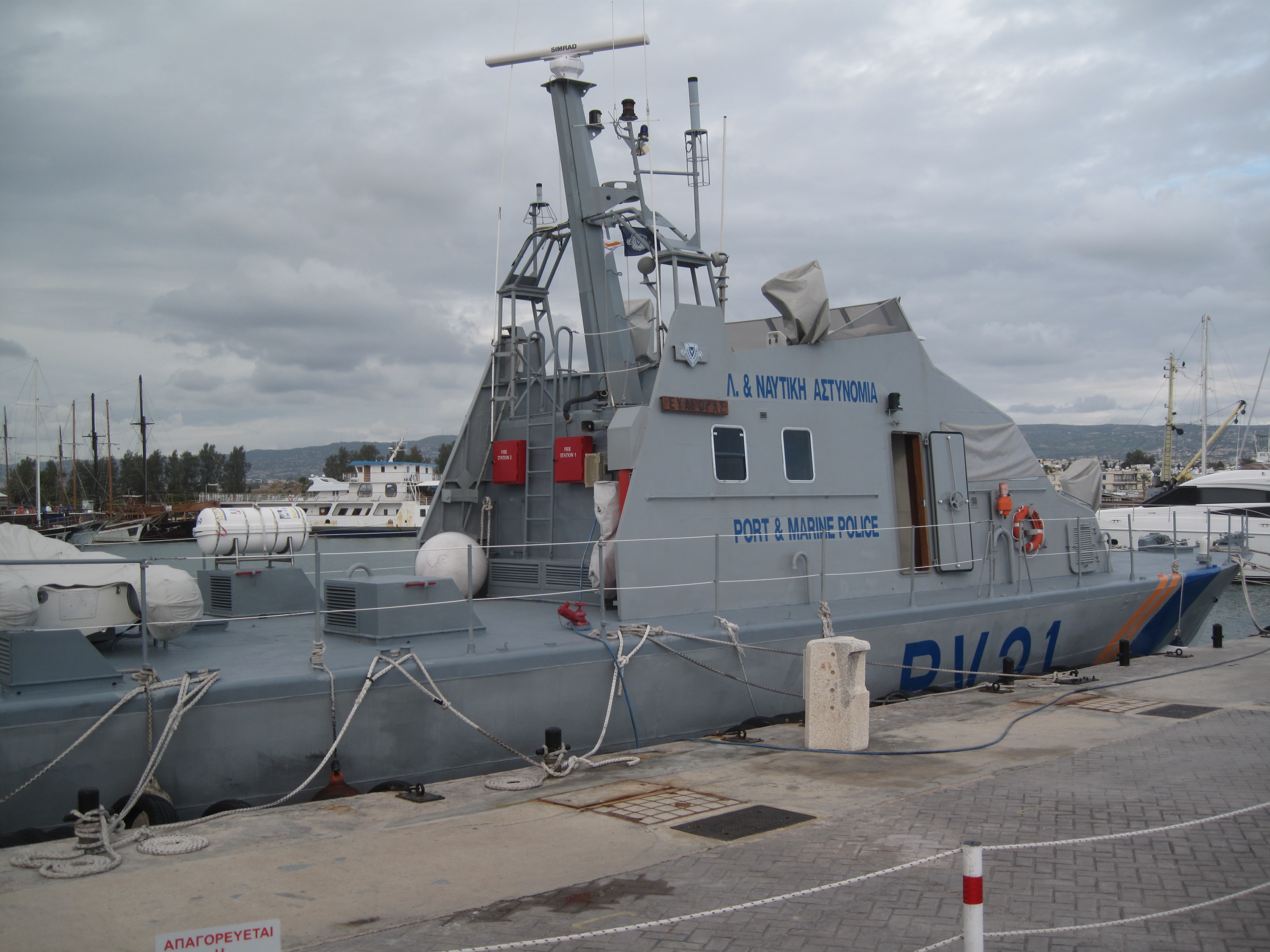
Cyprus Port and Marine Police jet FPB (Fast sea Patrol Boat)

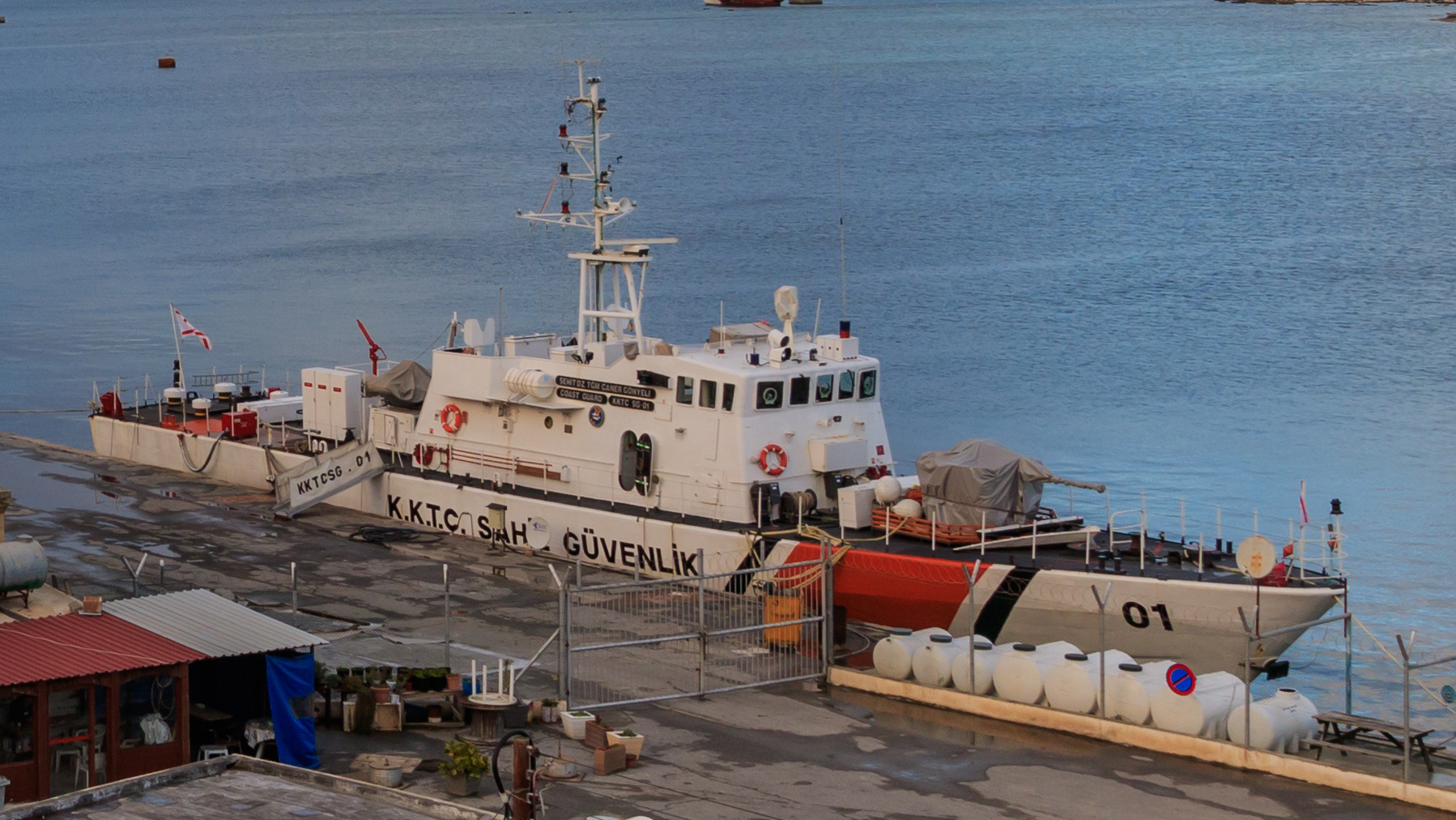
Northern Cyprus coast guard ship KKTCSG-01 at the Port of Famagusta

The Cyprus Port and Marine Police (Greek Λιμενική και Ναυτική Αστυνομία – Limeniki kai Nautiki Astinomia) fulfills the functions of other countries' coast guards for the Republic of Cyprus. Cyprus is an island country in the Eastern Mediterranean with about 1/3 of the island is under control of Turkish Republic of Northern Cyprus after 1974 Cypriot coup d'état and following Turkish military Invasion based on Treaty of Guarantee (1960). Due to the country's geopolitical situation, size, the recent discovery in 2011 of the Aphrodite gas field in its Exclusive Economic Zone and Cyprus Police being the main national law enforcement agency, the duties and responsibilities of the Cyprus Port and Marine Police are many and sometimes complex. It is a unit of the Cyprus Police, which resides under the Ministry of Justice and Public Order. However it can support the Cyprus Naval Command in wartime which resides under the Ministry of Defence. It is staffed by Police Officers which can be transferred to and from other units and agencies of the Cyprus Police and are tasked with the primary mission of policing the country's sea borders and the law enforcement of the waters around it. The unit is equipped with patrol boats and radars but it does not operate its own helicopters. Instead, it operates in combination with the aerial unit of the Cyprus Police, the Cyprus Police Aviation Unit. Main roles include law enforcement against illicit activities such as smuggling (due to the fact that although the Customs and Excise Department is a separate agency under the Ministry of Finance, it does not have an operational or tactical team of its own), terrorism, piracy, illegal fishing, Illegal drug trade, illegal immigration and is also assigned with search and rescue (SAR) duties. For counter-terrorism and anti-piracy operations, the units operate in combination with the Special Anti-Terrorist Squad which is part of the Emergency Response Unit of the Cyprus Police. Although the prominent agencies responsible for all Search and Rescue operations are conducted by Cyprus Police Units, the agency responsible to organize the SAR system, to co-ordinate, to control and direct SAR operations in the region that the Republic of Cyprus is responsible for (which coincides with the Nicosia FIR) is the Cyprus Joint Rescue Coordination Center or JRCC Larnaca, which is an independent agency of the Ministry of Defence.

=== Djibouti ===
The Djiboutian Coast Guard, part of the Djiboutian Armed Forces, is a humanitarian and security service. It protects Djibouti's borders and economic and security interests and defends its territorial waters and its Exclusive Economic Zone.

=== Egypt ===
The Egyptian Coast Guard, part of the Egyptian Navy, is responsible for the onshore protection of public installations near the coast and the patrol of coastal waters to prevent smuggling.

=== France ===
In the French Republic, the Coast Guard Function is a coordination mechanism placed under the authority of the Prime Minister of France and managed by the Secrétariat général de la Mer. The participating agencies are the French Navy, the Maritime Gendarmerie, the Coastguard Service of the French Customs, the Directorate general for Maritime affairs, Fisheries and Aquaculture, the Border Police, and the Sécurité Civile, as well as a charity, the Société Nationale de Sauvetage en Mer.

=== Georgia ===
The Georgian Coast Guard is the maritime arm of the Georgian Border Police, within the Ministry for Internal Affairs. It is responsible for the maritime protection of the entire 310 km (190 mi) coastline of Georgia, as well as the Georgian territorial waters. The primary missions of the service are administration of the territorial waters, marine pollution protection, maritime law enforcement, search and rescue, port security and maritime defense. The former Georgian Navy was absorbed into the Coast Guard in 2009.

The headquarters and a principal Coast Guard base are located at the Black Sea port of Poti. A second smaller base is in Batumi, Adjaria. Besides the Poti-based force, the Coast Guard also includes a special counter-terrorist Detachment. Maritime surveillance radar stations are maintained at Anaklia, Poti, Supsa, Chakvi, and Gonio, providing coverage of all territorial seas.

=== Germany ===
The German Federal Coast Guard, known as the Küstenwache, is both a civilian service and a law enforcement organisation, staffed with both police officers and certain civilians from the various German federal agencies associated with maritime administration with responsibility for the coordination of all law enforcement activities within its jurisdiction in the Federal Republic of Germany.

=== Greece ===
The Hellenic Coast Guard (Greek: Λιμενικό Σώμα-Ελληνική Ακτοφυλακή, romanized: Limeniko Soma-Elliniki Aktofylaki, lit. 'Harbor Corps-Hellenic Coast Guard') is the national coast guard of the Hellenic Republic. It is a paramilitary organization that can support the Hellenic Navy in wartime, but resides under separate civilian control in times of peace. It was founded in 1919 by an Act of Parliament and the legal framework for its function was reformed in 1927.

=== Grenada ===
The Royal Grenada Coast Guard is the maritime security unit of the Royal Grenada Police Force. Operating a small fleet of high speed patrol boats, its remit includes general patrol and protection of territorial waters, search and rescue, and drug interdiction.

=== Haiti ===
The Haitian Coast Guard Commission is an operational unit of the Haitian National Police. It is one of the few law enforcement organisations in the world to combine water policing and coast guard duties while remaining as a policing unit. It operates primarily as a law enforcement agency, with secondary responsibilities in search and rescue.

=== Iceland ===
The Icelandic Coast Guard has primarily been a law enforcement organisation, but is also in charge of national defences. It has also been involved with the Republic of Iceland's contributions to expeditionary operations and conducted military exercises: for example, Operation Enduring Freedom and Northern Challenge.

=== India ===
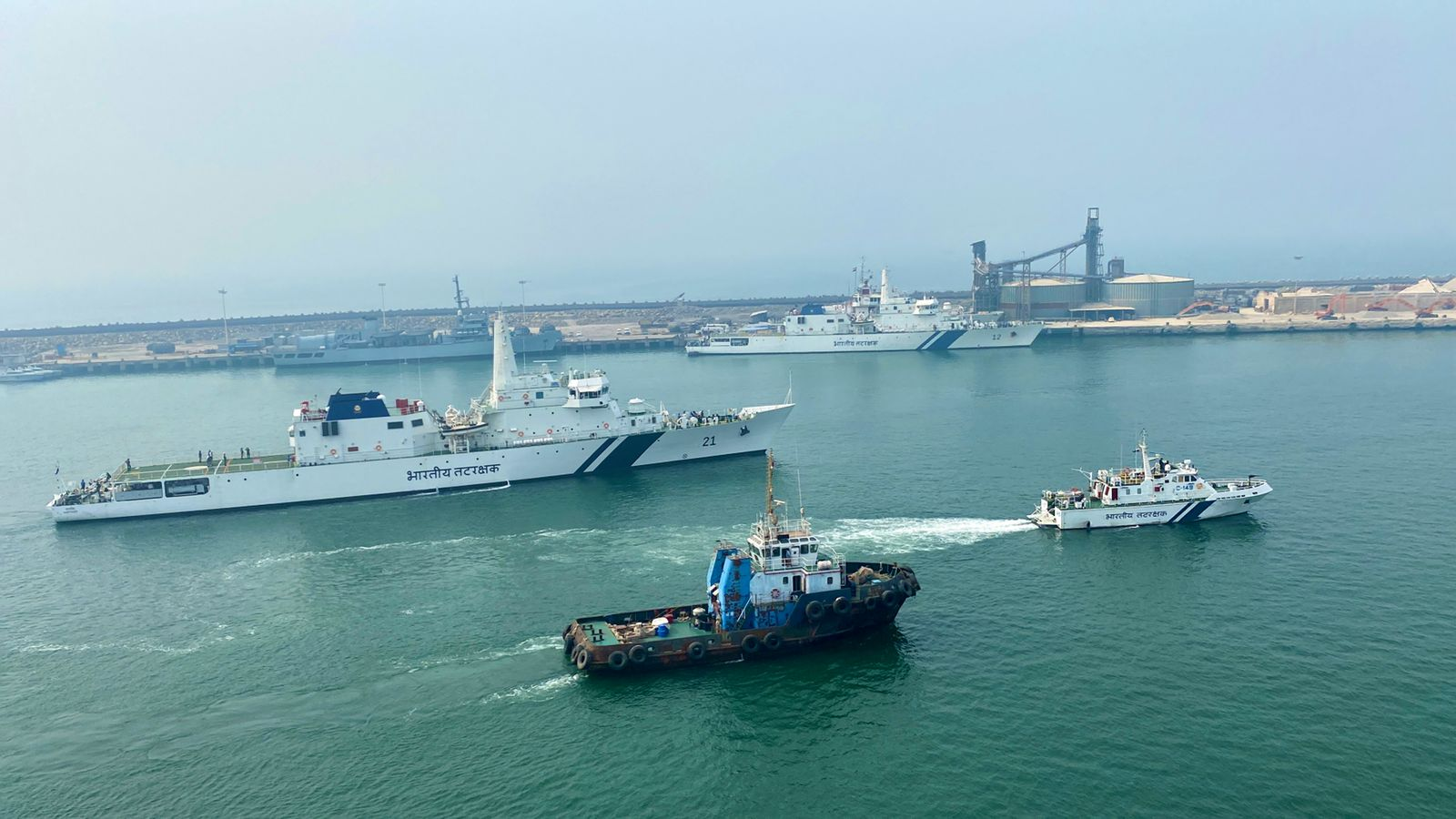
Indian Coast Guard flotilla in Porbandar

The Indian Coast Guard (ICG) is under the Ministry of Defence. It has responsibility for search and rescue, enforcing the maritime law of anti-smuggling, immigration and shipping regulations and protecting the country's maritime and offshore resources. With 78 plus aircraft and drones, 182 plus vessels and ships, the Indian Coast Guard defends one of the longest coastlines of the Indian Ocean region.

=== Iran ===
The Iranian NEDSA controls the south entry point. The Border Guard Command Marine faraja sea also performs maritime duties in the north alongside the Iranian Navy.

=== Indonesia ===
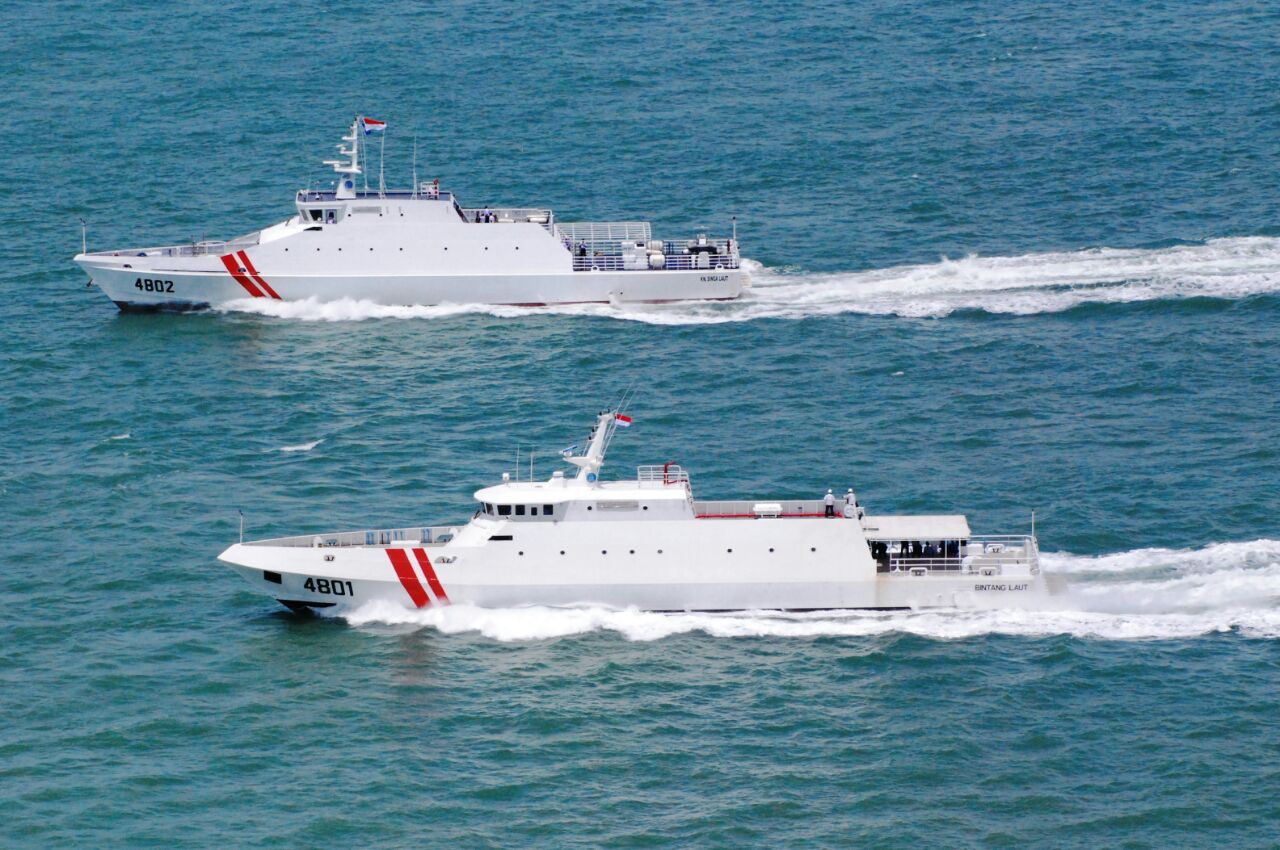
Two patrol ships of the Indonesian Maritime Security Board during a patrol.

Maritime Law Enforcement in Indonesia is conducted by multiple government agencies, including the Indonesian Navy, Indonesian Maritime Security Agency, Indonesian Sea and Coast Guard, Directorate General of Marine and Fisheries Resources Surveillance, and National Police Water Unit. There has been plans to amalgamate these different maritime law enforcement agencies to become a singular national 'sea and coast guard agency'. In March 2022, the government issue regulation on Governance of Maritime Security, Safety and Law Enforcement at Indonesia's Territorial Water and Jurisdiction and designate Maritime Security Agency as coordinating body for all maritime law enforcement agencies.

=== Ireland ===
The Irish Coast Guard (IRCG) makes up one arm of the Maritime Safety Services, the other being the Maritime Safety Directorate. Both arms are due to merge into a new "one stop shop" agency for all maritime safety matters.

The purpose of the Irish Coast Guard is:

To reduce the loss of life within the Irish Search and Rescue Region and on rivers, lakes and waterways and to protect the quality of the marine environment within the Irish Pollution Responsibility Zone, Harbours and Maritime Local Authority areas and to preserve property. To promote safety standards, and by doing so, prevent, as far as possible, the loss of life at sea and on inland waters and other areas, and to provide an effective emergency response service.

=== Isle of Man ===
The Isle of Man is a Crown dependency in the Irish Sea between Ireland and the United Kingdom. It is not part of the United Kingdom, but historically relied upon the UK Coastguard. However, the UK Coastguard withdrew in 1988, and the Isle of Man Government formed its own Coastguard in 1989. Its key functions are coastal patrol, pollution control, and shore-based search and rescue. It also co-operates with other agencies as part of the Isle of Man Inland Search and Rescue Group. It maintains the Isle of Man's Marine Operations Centre (control room), but it has no aircraft, and contracts air-sea rescue to the UK Coastguard.

=== Italy ===
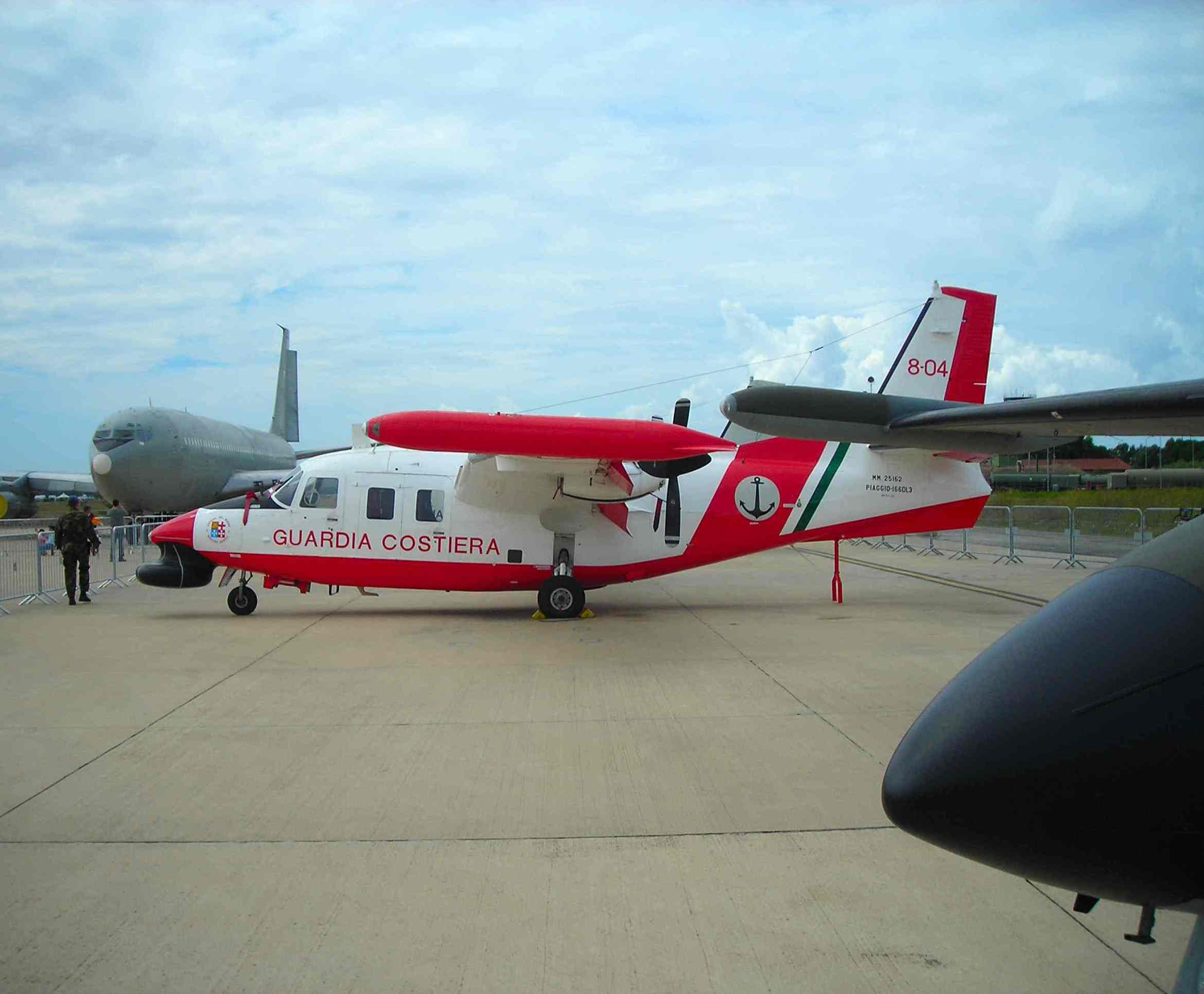
Piaggio P.166 aircraft used by Italian Coast Guard

In the Republic of Italy, the Guardia Costiera is part of the Italian Navy under the Ministry of Infrastructure and Transport. They have responsibility for enforcement of shipping and maritime safety regulations, as well as performing search and rescue duties

=== Japan ===
In Japan, the Japan Coast Guard is under the oversight of the Ministry of Land, Infrastructure, Transport and Tourism, and is responsible for the protection of the coast-lines and islands of Japan.

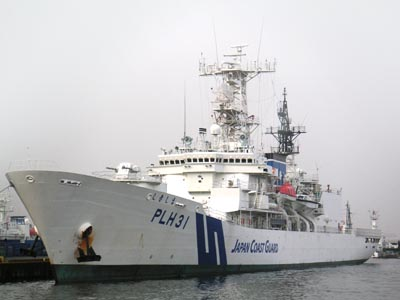
Shikishima (PLH 31), a patrol vessel of the Japan Coast Guard

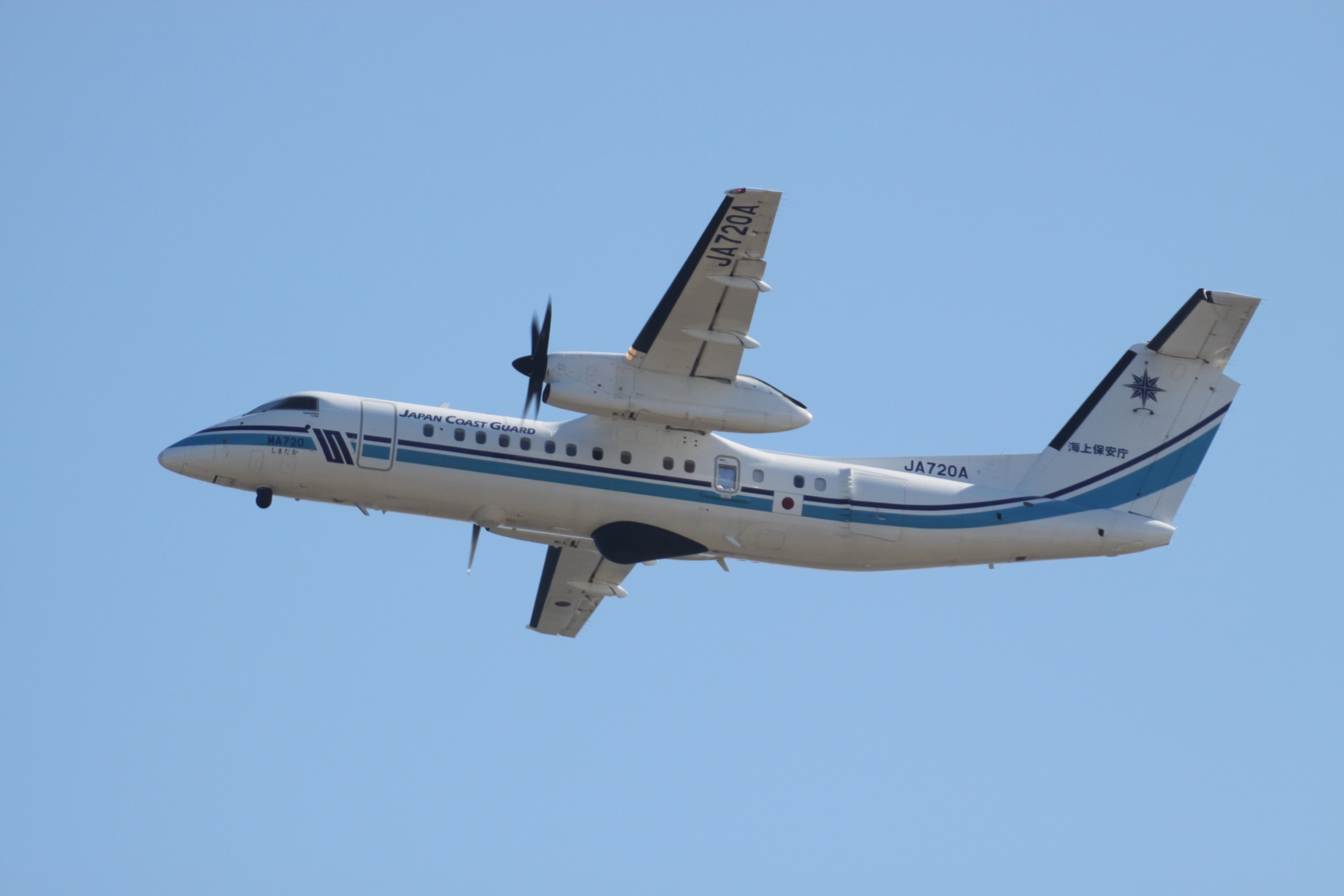
A Bombardier Dash 8, modified to act as a Maritime Patrol Aircraft, in Japan Coast Guard service

=== Jersey ===
The Island of Jersey Coastguard is the coastguard service of the Government of Jersey, an independent Crown dependency located near to northern France. Its main responsibilities are safety at sea, maritime security and law enforcement, search and rescue services (with partner agencies), and protection of the marine environment. "Channel Islands AirSearch" works with the Coastguard service on search and rescue operations, and therefore the Coastguard does not maintain its own aircraft.

=== Kenya ===
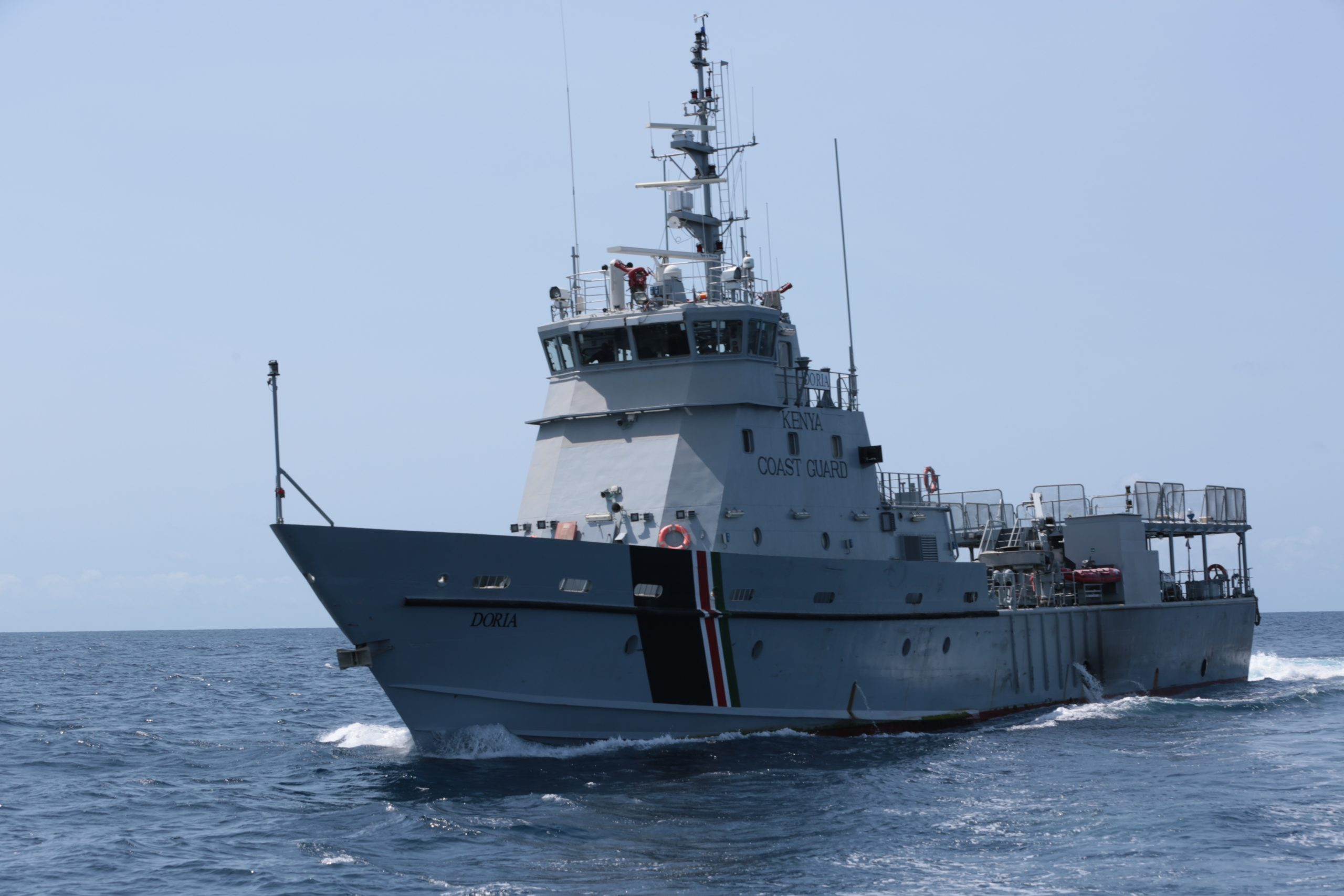
The offshore patrol vessel, MV Doria, used by the Kenya Coast Guard Service (KCGS)

The Kenya Coast Guard Service is a specialised maritime force of the Republic of Kenya, responsible for law enforcement on national waters, including on lakes and rivers, as well as in the Indian Ocean. The force is mandated to maintain maritime safety, security, pollution control and sanitation. It is also responsible for apprehending and prosecuting offenders.

=== South Korea ===
The Korea Coast Guard (Korean: 해양경찰청; Hanja: 海洋警察廳, Revised Romanization: Haeyang-gyeongchal-cheong, Maritime Police Agency) is responsible for maritime safety and control off the coast of the Republic of Korea/South Korea. The KCG is an external branch of the R.O.K.'s Ministry of Maritime Affairs and Fisheries during peacetime.

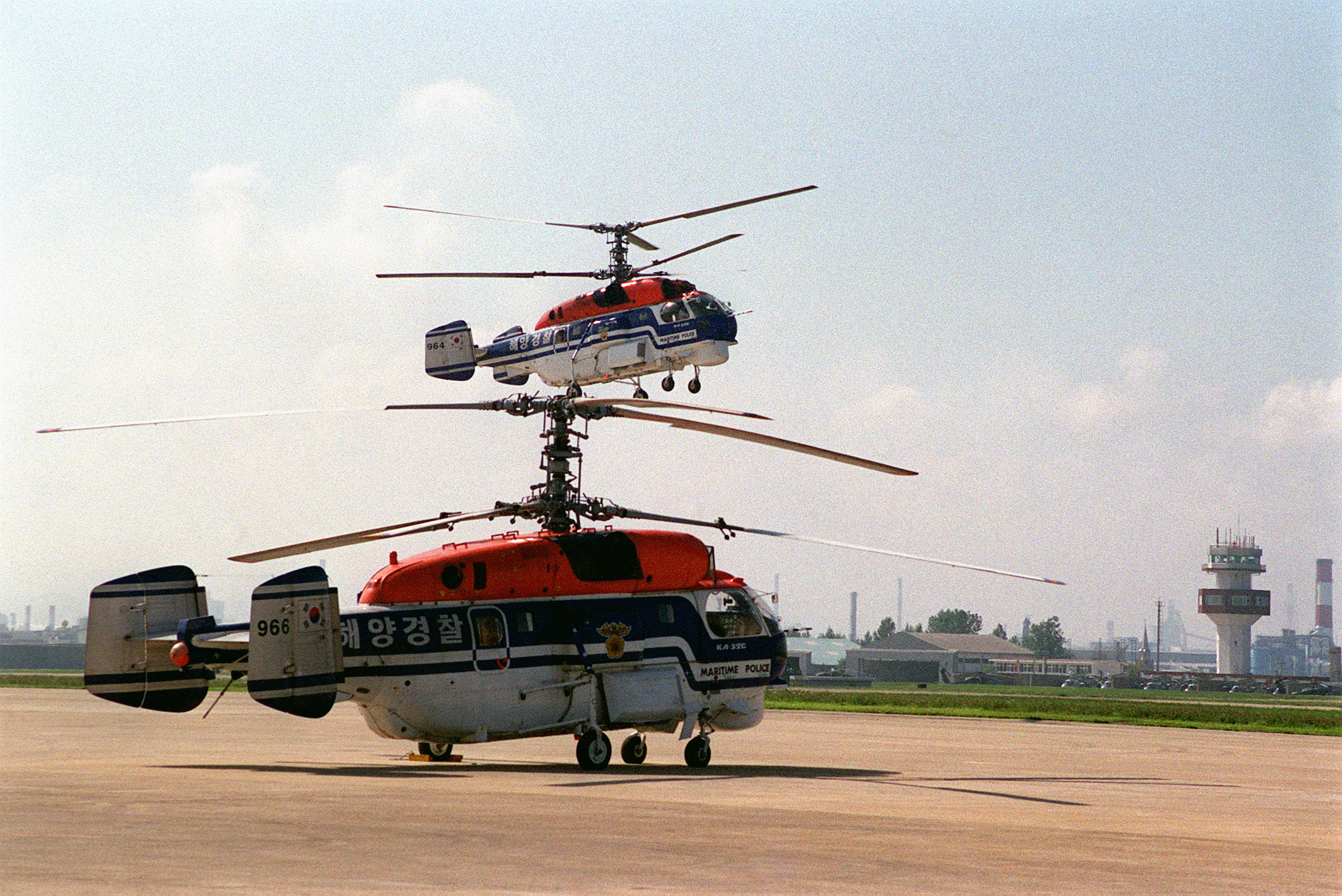
Kamov Ka-32 helicopters of the Republic of Korea Coast Guard

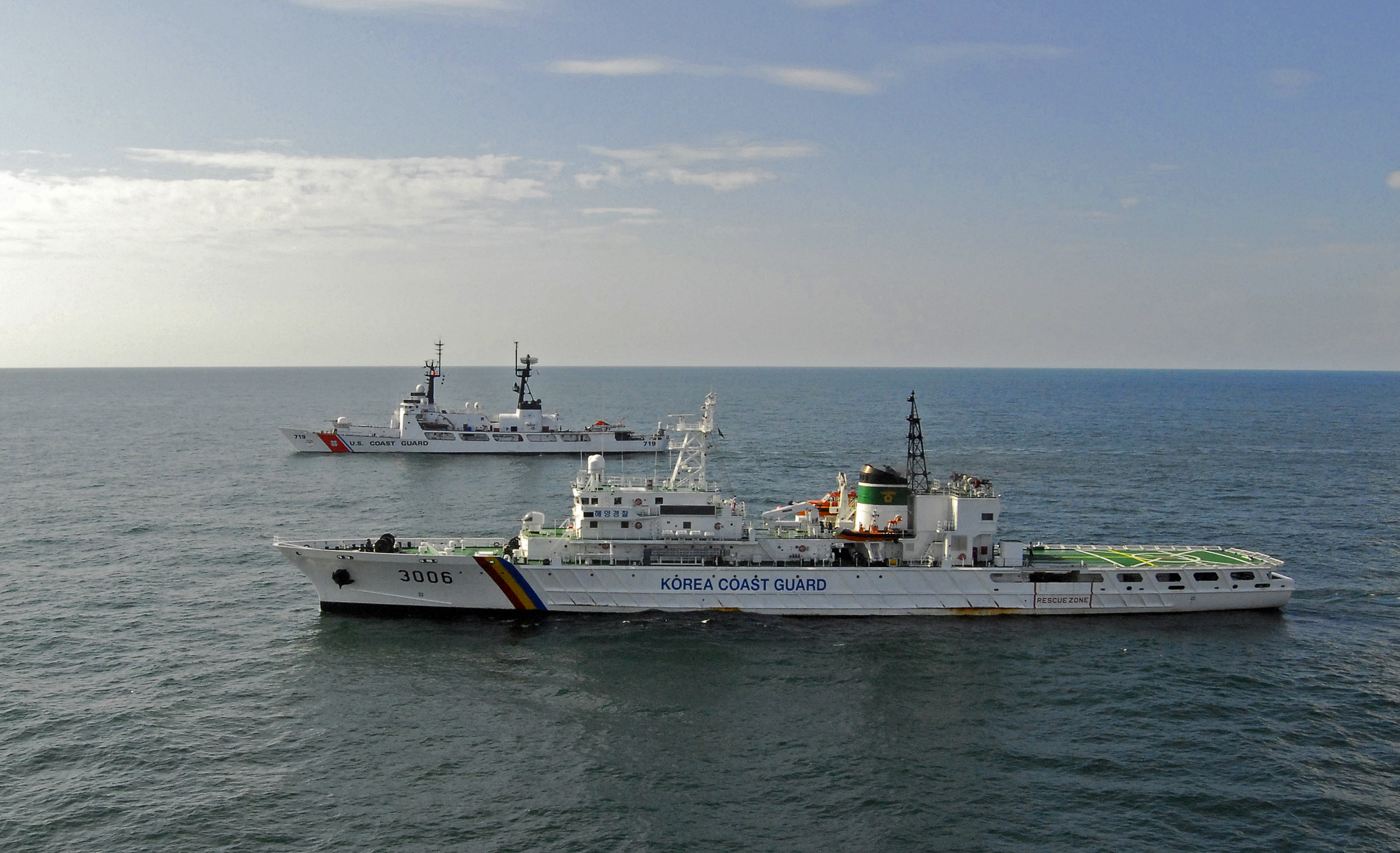
A Korea Coast Guard vessel training with a US Coast Guard vessel, in the distance

=== Libya ===
The Libyan Coast Guard, part of the Libyan Navy, is responsible for the onshore protection of public installations near the coast and the patrol of coastal waters to prevent smuggling.

=== Malaysia ===
In Malaysia, the Malaysian Maritime Enforcement Agency is part of the Malaysian Coast Guard and is under the Ministry of Home Affairs.

The agency is headed by a director general who is appointed by the Yang Di Pertuan Agong on the advice of the prime minister while other personnel are appointed by the Public Services Commission.

In times of war, crisis or emergency, the agency may be placed under the command of the Malaysian Armed Forces. It was formed to combat the rise of piracy in the Strait of Malacca. Personnel often work very closely with the Royal Malaysian Navy and Royal Malaysian Air Force. The agency utilizes its resources in a maritime law enforcement and search and rescue capacity.

=== Mexico ===
The Maritime Search and Rescue (Búsqueda y Rescate Marítimo) is a coast guard-type unit of the Mexican Navy. Its primary mission is search and rescue operations within 50 miles (80 km) of the Mexican coastline.

=== Myanmar ===
The Myanmar Coast Guard or MCG is the coast guard of Myanmar, founded on 6 October 2021, and its legal framework was legalised on 17 July 2025, with the 2025 Myanmar Coast Guard Law which was enacted by the State Administration Council (SAC). Its primary duties are anti-piracy operations, securing maritime infrastructure, fisheries control as well as maritime safety and security responsibilities. Before the MCG's founding, coast guard duties were handled by the Myanmar Navy and the Myanmar Police Force's Maritime Police.

=== Netherlands ===
The Kingdom of The Netherlands Coastguard (Dutch: Kustwacht Nederland) is a national organization responsible for various services along The Netherlands' ocean coastline (mainly search and rescue services).

==== Caribbean Netherlands ====
The Dutch Caribbean Coastguard (Dutch: Kustwacht Caraïbisch Gebied) is the coast guard of the Kingdom of the Netherlands in the Caribbean, providing search & rescue, and maritime law enforcement in Aruba, Curaçao, Sint Maarten, Bonaire, Sint Eustatius and Saba.

=== New Zealand ===
The Royal New Zealand Coastguard is a civilian volunteer charitable organisation, providing search and rescue services to coastal waterways and some lakes in New Zealand. Smaller incidents are coordinated by the New Zealand Police, who may call on the services and resources of the coastguard. Larger incidents are managed by the Rescue Coordination Centre New Zealand (RCCNZ), with support from the Royal New Zealand Defence Force.

=== Norway ===
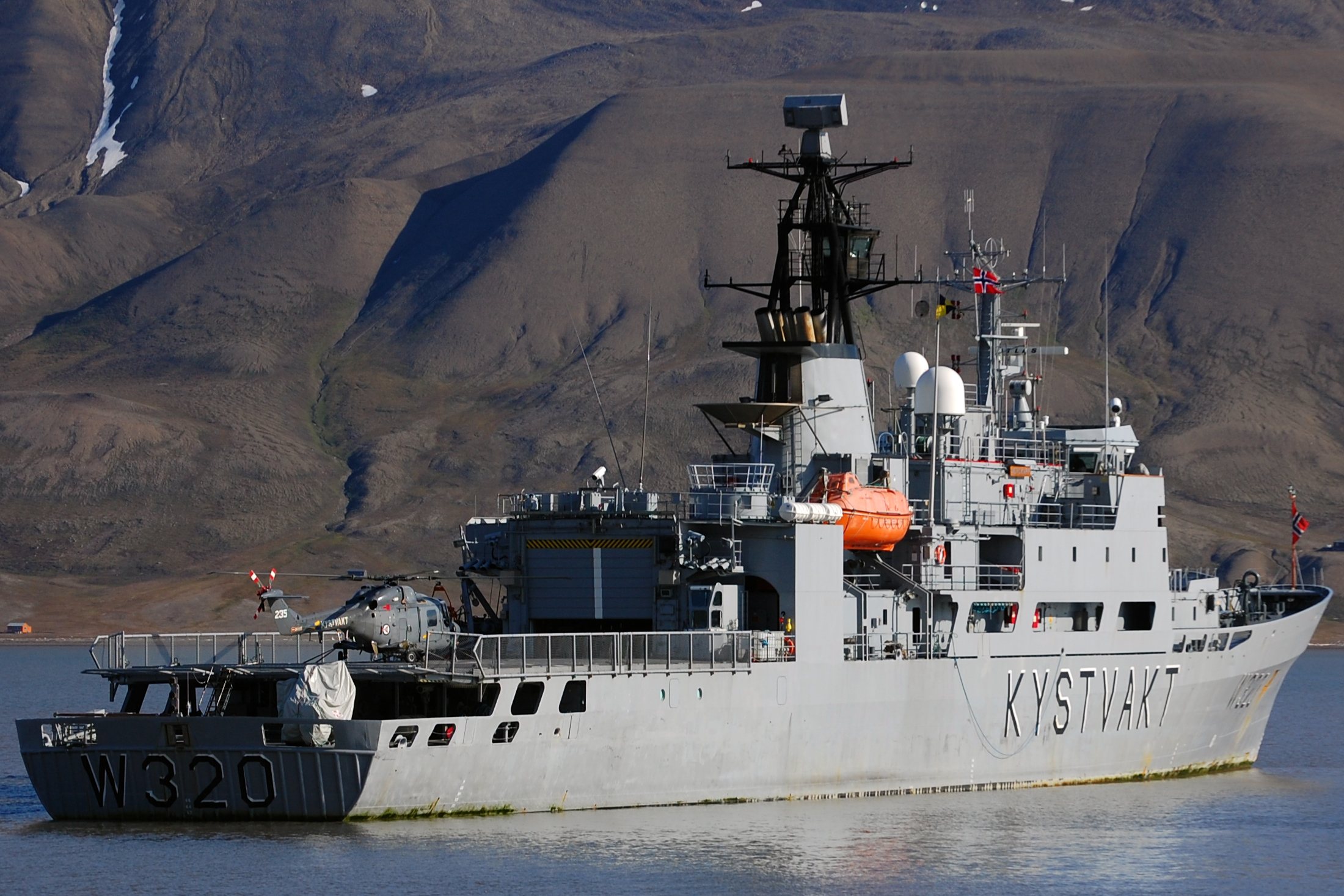
NoCGV Nordkapp, a Nordkapp-class offshore patrol vessel of the Royal Norwegian Coast Guard off Svalbard

The Royal Norwegian Coast Guard, or Kystvakten in Norwegian, is a part of the Royal Norwegian Navy, but has separate vessels, many of which are purpose-built. Coast guard vessels have the prefix KV. Four of these vessels are capable of embarking one or more helicopters. Norway's exclusive economic zone, the Coast Guard's area of responsibility, is about 2.2 million square kilometers, one of the largest in Europe.

=== Pakistan ===
In Pakistan, there are two agencies operating on the coast:

- Pakistan Maritime Security Agency (PMSA) under the Pakistan Navy
- Pakistan Coast Guards (PCG) under the Pakistan Army.

The MSA is a military force operated by the Navy under the direction of Ministry of Defence. It is responsible for the strategic security of Pakistan's coastlines, as well as law enforcement within the country's exclusive economic zone. The Pakistani Coast Guard is placed under the Pakistan Army and has responsibilities for conducting riverine operations, protecting coastal areas and shores of Karachi.

=== Peru ===
The Peruvian Coast Guard, officially known as the Directorate General of Captaincies and Coast Guard of Peru is a force attached to the Peruvian Navy and is the coast guard of the Republic of Peru, responsible for search and rescue tasks, maritime law enforcement, fisheries protection, marine environmental protection and vessel safety.

=== Philippines ===
In the Republic of the Philippines, the Philippine Coast Guard (PCG) is a maritime law enforcement agency operating under the Department of Transportation of the Republic of the Philippines government. It is tasked with the broader enforcement of maritime laws, especially against smuggling, illegal fishing, drug trafficking, and piracy. It patrols the country's 36,289-kilometer coastline and hundreds of islands, and is also involved in maritime search and rescue (SAR) missions, as well as the protection of the marine environment. The Philippine Coast Guard also serves as an attached service of the Armed Forces of the Philippines in wartime.

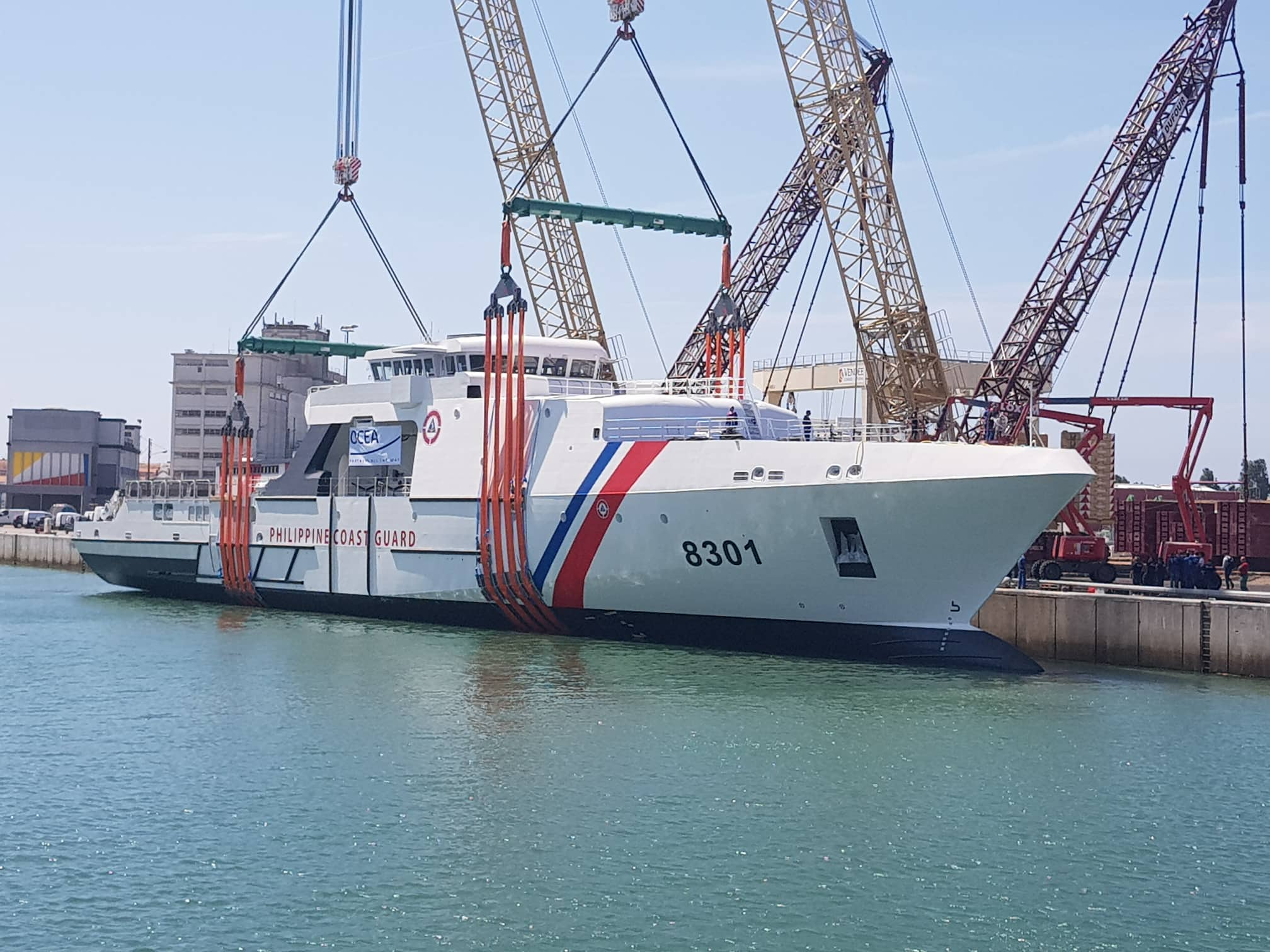
BRP Gabriela Silang (OPV-8301), an offshore patrol vessel of the Philippine Coast Guard

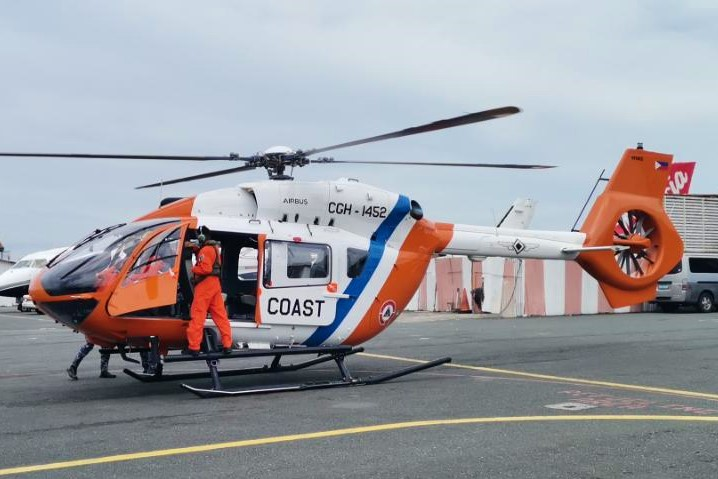
Airbus H145 Helicopter of the Philippine Coast Guard

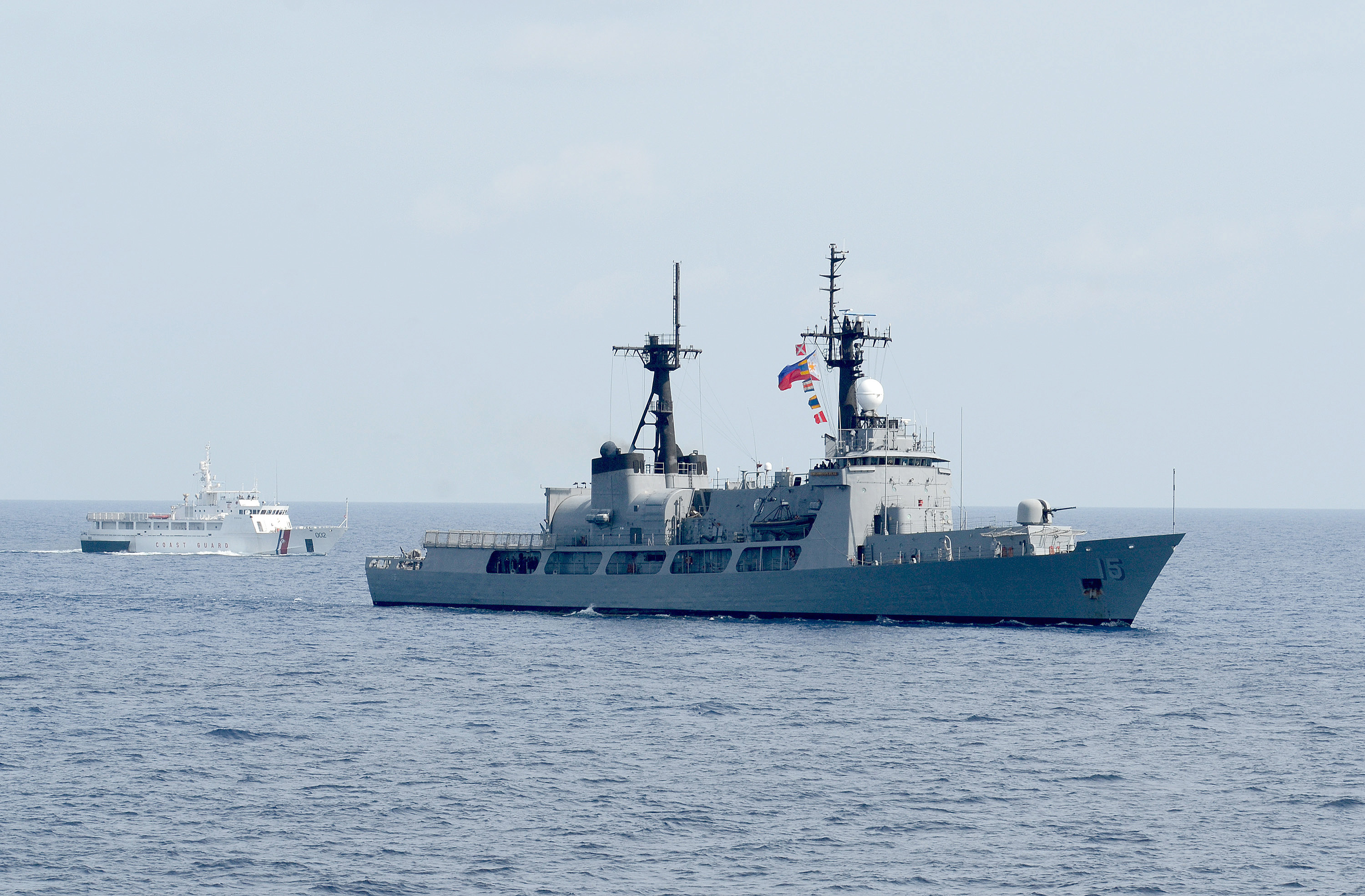
The Philippine Coast Guard vessel BRP EDSA II (SARV-002) and the Philippine Navy offshore patrol vessel BRP Gregorio del Pilar (PS-15) steam in formation during Cooperation Afloat Readiness and Training (CARAT) Philippines 2013

=== Poland ===
In Poland, the law enforcement coast guard role is performed by the Maritime Branch of the Polish Border Guard (Morski Oddział Straży Granicznej). It is part of the Polish Border Guard. Search and Rescue (SAR) role of coast guard is performed by Maritime Search and Rescue Service (Morska Służba Poszukiwania i Ratownictwa). Recently, government published plans to integrate Maritime SAR Service within Maritime Authorities (the two remaining local offices: Maritime Office in Gdynia and Maritime Office in Szczecin), as supposedly efficiency and cost improving measures (already disbanded Maritime Office in Slupsk and split operational area between remaining two Offices). Operational structure (SAR assets, etc.) shall remain mostly unchanged, moving only administrative duties to Maritime Authorities' two local offices.

=== Portugal ===
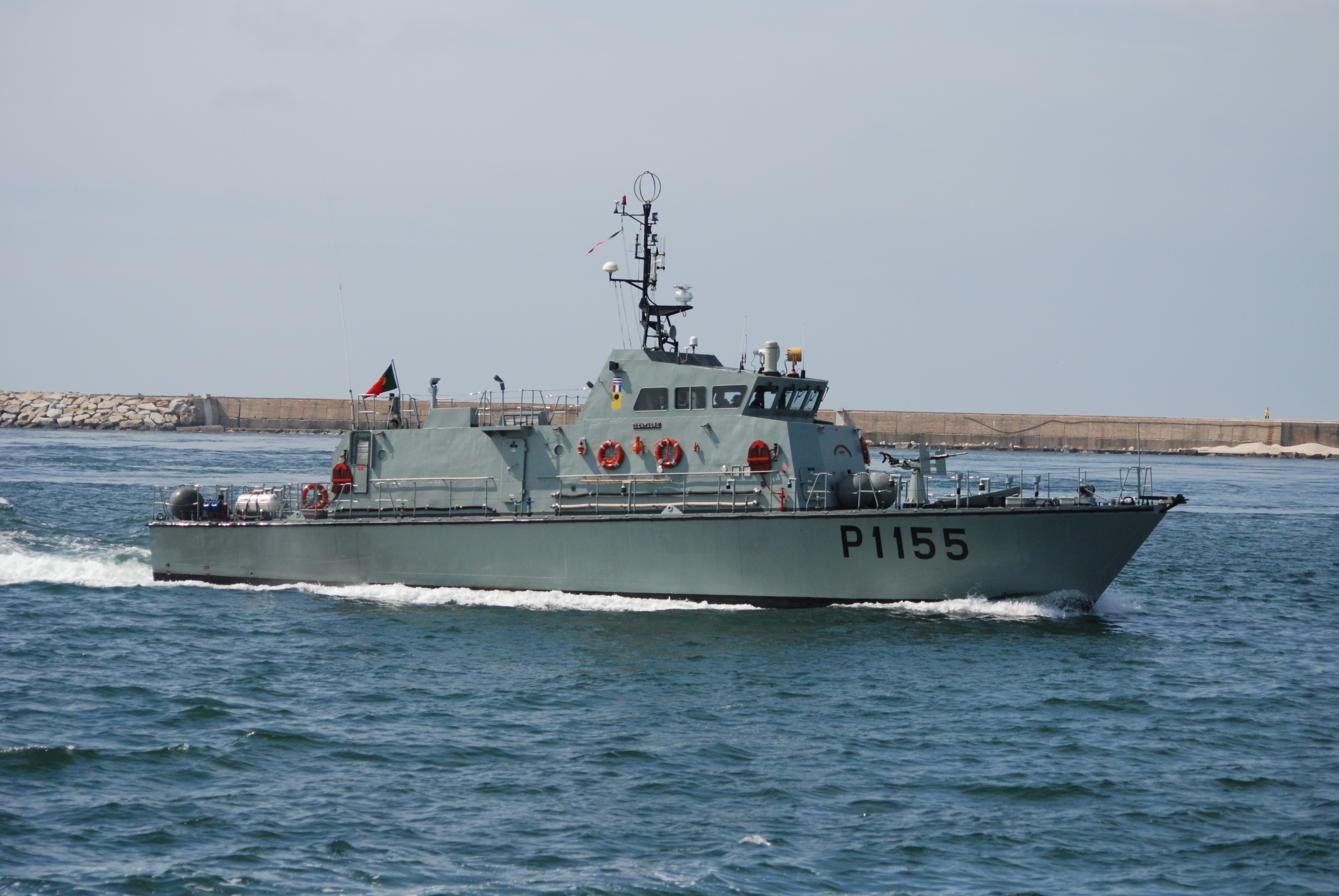
A Portuguese Navy Centauro-class patrol boat, one of its assets employed in the coast guard role under the Portuguese National Maritime Authority

In Portugal, the coast guard role is performed by several government agencies that, together, form the Maritime Authority System (Sistema de Autoridade Marítima or SAM). The SAM includes the Portuguese Navy, the National Republican Guard (GNR), the Portuguese Air Force, the Border and Immigration Service (SEF), the Civil Protection Authority, the National Medical Emergency Institute and the Criminal Investigation Police (PJ).

The National Maritime Authority (Autoridade Marítima Nacional or AMN) is the branch of the Portuguese Navy responsible for its coast guard role. The function of AMN is performed by the Chief of Staff of the Navy himself, supported in this role by the Directorate of the Maritime Authority, which includes the Maritime Police, the Lifeguard Institute, the Lighthouse Department and the several harbourmasters. Besides the specific assets of the Directorate of Maritime Authority entirely dedicated to the coast guard role, the AMN also has at its disposal the other Portuguese Navy's assets that can be used both for military and public service missions.

The vessels operated within the SAM include the Maritime Police patrol boats, the Lifeguard Institute lifeboats, the harbourmasters harbour boats, the GNR Coastal Control Unit' surveillance boats and the Portuguese Navy's naval ships. The aircraft operated within the SAM include fixed-wing aircraft from the Portuguese Air Force and helicopters from the Navy, the Air Force and the Civil Protection Authority.

=== Russia ===
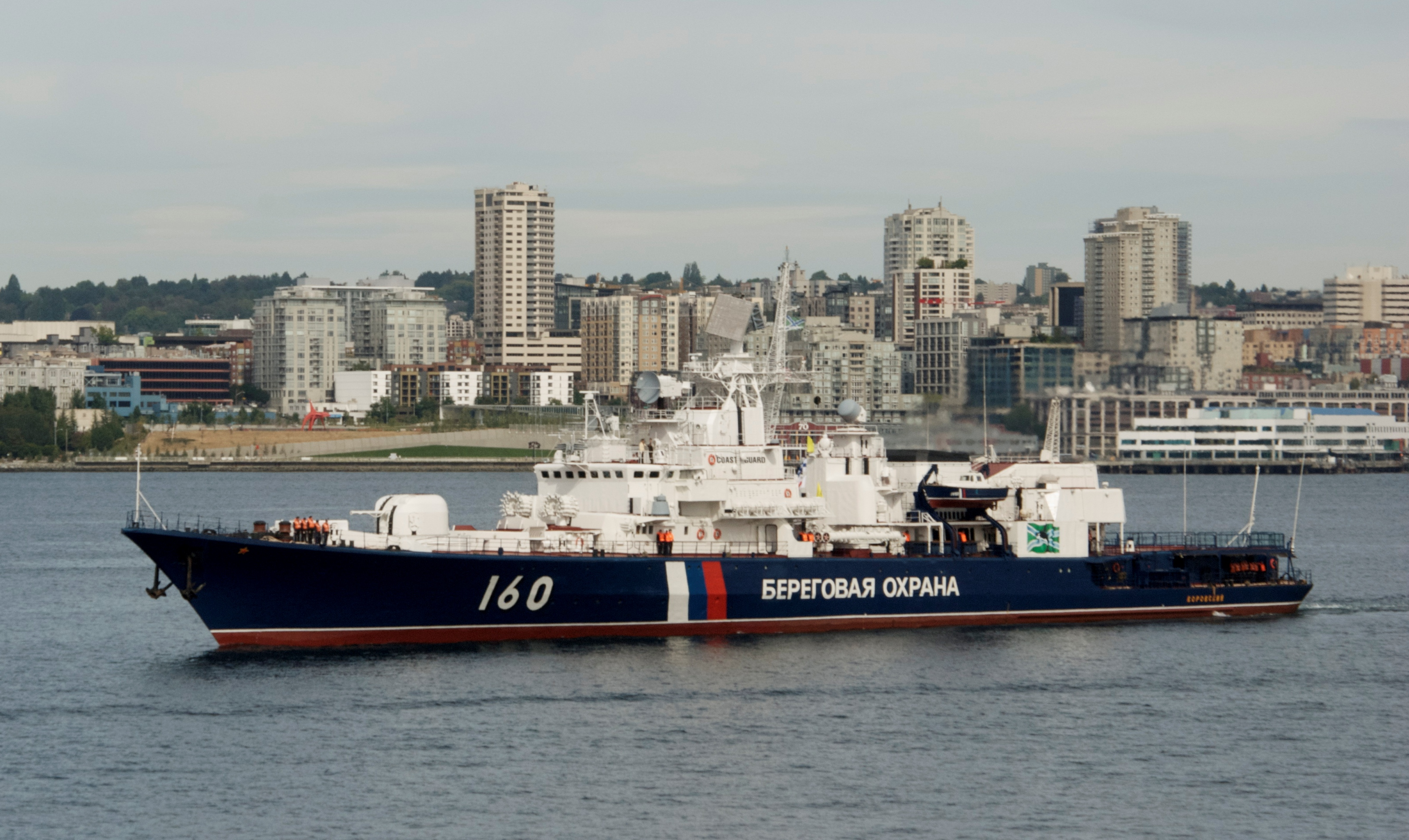
Russian Border Guard vessel Vorovskiy in Seattle

Russia's Coast Guard (Береговая охрана России), officially the Coast Guard of the Border Service of the Federal Security Service of the Russian Federation, operates under the auspices of the Border Service of the Federal Security Service of the Russian Federation (itself a branch of the FSB or Federal Security Service). Its remit encompasses the twelve-mile limit of all Russian territorial and coastal waters and, being equipped with frigates, corvettes, fast patrol boats, hydrofoils, helicopters, and light aircraft, it has considerable combat capability on behalf of the continent-wide border guard of the Russian Federation.

For inland waters operations, Russia has the National Guard Naval Service Corps, established in 1978. The National Guard Naval Service Corps is a part of the Federal Service of Troops of National Guard of the Russian Federation. Inland waters SAR operations are also under the purview of the Ministry of Civil Defence, Emergencies and Disaster Relief.

=== Singapore ===
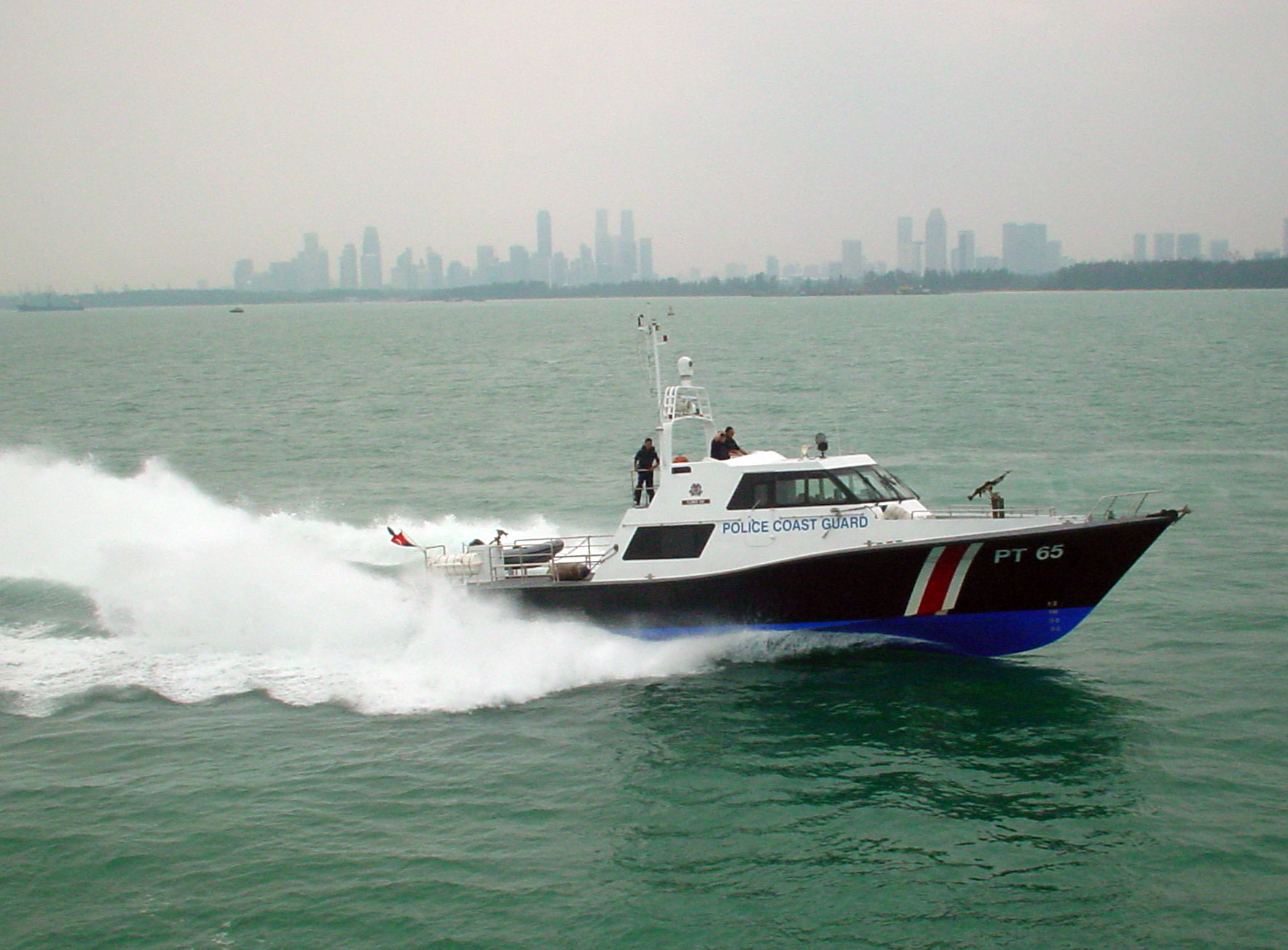
A third generation patrol craft of the Police Coast Guard conducting a sea-rescue demonstration off the southeastern coast of Singapore

In Singapore, the Police Coast Guard (PCG) is an operational department of the Singapore Police Force. Functions of the coast guard were transferred from the Republic of Singapore Navy to what was then the Marine Police in February 1993. The Marine Police was thus restructured and renamed as the Police Coast Guard, one of the few law enforcement organizations in the world to combine water policing and coast guard duties while remaining as a policing unit. It operates primarily as a law enforcement agency, with secondary responsibilities in search and rescue.

=== South Africa ===
South Africa does not have a dedicated coast guard service in its military; the South African Navy handles coast guard-like duties. In 2017 it was reported that the Republic of South Africa was looking into establishing a coast guard.

=== Spain ===
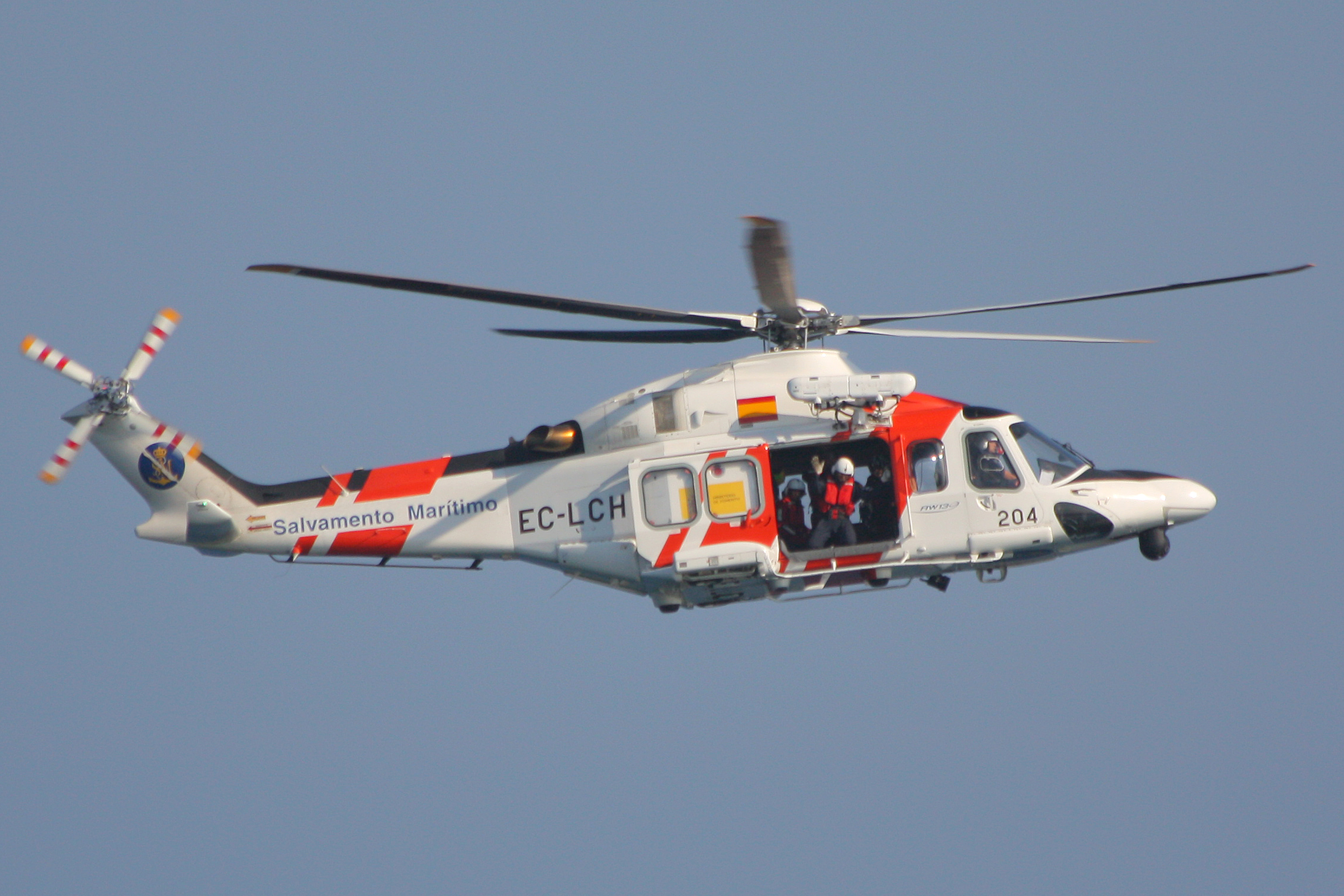
An AW139 helicopter of Spain's Sociedad de Salvamento y Seguridad Marítima

The Kingdom of Spain operates several coast guard agencies.

The Sociedad de Salvamento y Seguridad Marítima, also known as Salvamento Marítimo, or by its acronym SASEMAR, is the body in charge of maritime traffic control, safety and rescue operations, as well as protection of the maritime environment, but lacks any law enforcement responsibilities. The agency runs 20 rescue coordination centres (RCC), employs a staff of 1500 and operates a fleet of 19 vessels, 54 boats, 11 helicopters and 3 airplanes.

Border protection functions in the Kingdom of Spain are carried out by the Civil Guard (Servicio Marítimo de la Guardia Civil), with a staff of 1100 and a fleet of 67 patrol vessels and speedboats. Maritime customs functions are the responsibility of the Servicio de Vigilancia Aduanera with 13 aircraft and a surface fleet of 2 high seas cutters; 18 high speed patrol vessels; and 21 medium-sized and smaller patrol vessels.

Salvamento Marítimo operates in the four international SAR areas assigned to Spain: Atlántico, Canarias, Estrecho and Mediterráneo, covering a combined extension of 1.5 million square kilometers. During a maritime emergency, Salvamento Marítimo is responsible for the coordination of other possible responders, like the Spanish Navy or the Servicio Aéreo de Rescate, that comprises squadrons 801, 802 and 803 of the Spanish Air Force. Coordination on land, sea and air are made with the North Atlantic Treaty Organization (NATO), and cooperative European Union

==== Galicia ====
The autonomous community of Galicia has its own separate coast guard service, the Servizo de Gardacostas de Galicia or simply Gardacostas de Galicia. It is the Galician Government agency responsible for coastal and fisheries surveillance; maritime search and rescue; and protection of the sea environment. The Gardacostas de Galicia operates a fleet of more than 20 vessels and two helicopters, from the bases of Viveiro, Ferrol, A Coruña, Muxía, Porto do Son, Ribeira, Vilagarcía de Arousa, Pontevedra and Vigo.

The Gardacostas de Galicia was created in 2004, by the amalgamation of the former Servizo de Vixilancia Pesqueira (Galician Fisheries Surveillance Service) and the Servizo de Busca e Salvamento (Galician Search and Rescue Service).

=== Sri Lanka ===
In Sri Lanka, until 2009 a Coast Guard Unit existed under the Ministry of Fisheries and Aquatic Resources, responsible for fishery and natural resource protection coastal areas. A new Department of Coast Guard was created under the Department of Coast Guard Bill presented to parliament in 2009. The department would be under the purview of the Ministry of Defense and be staffed by civilian personnel. The department's responsibilities include search and rescue, law enforcement within the country's Exclusive economic zone, conducting anti-smuggling and anti-immigration operations, suppression of terrorist activities in territorial waters of Sri Lanka.

=== Sweden ===
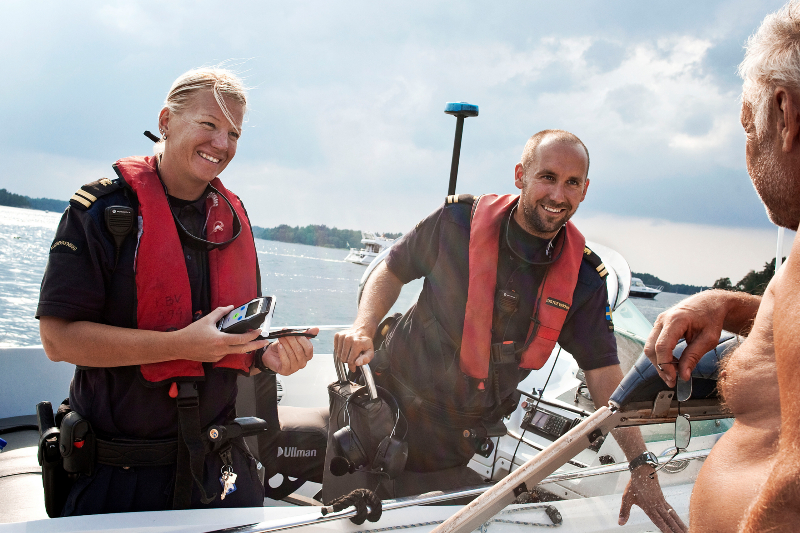
Swedish coast guards conducting an alcohol test

The Swedish Coast Guard (Swedish: Kustbevakningen) is a Swedish civilian government agency with combination of police tasks, border control, maritime rescue and environmental control. Coast Guard officers carries the same equipment to regular Swedish police officers. Tasks:

- maritime surveillance and other control and inspection tasks as well as environmental cleanup after oil spills at sea
- co-ordinate the civilian needs for maritime surveillance and maritime information
- follow international development within the field and take part in international efforts to establish border controls, law enforcement at sea, environmental protection at sea and other maritime surveillance tasks.

The Swedish Coast Guard carries out some of its surveillance by air (from its base in Skavsta near Stockholm), and some on ice and snow (from its Luleå station). It also has marine duties on Lake Vänern, Europe's third largest lake, operating out of Vänersborg.

=== Taiwan ===
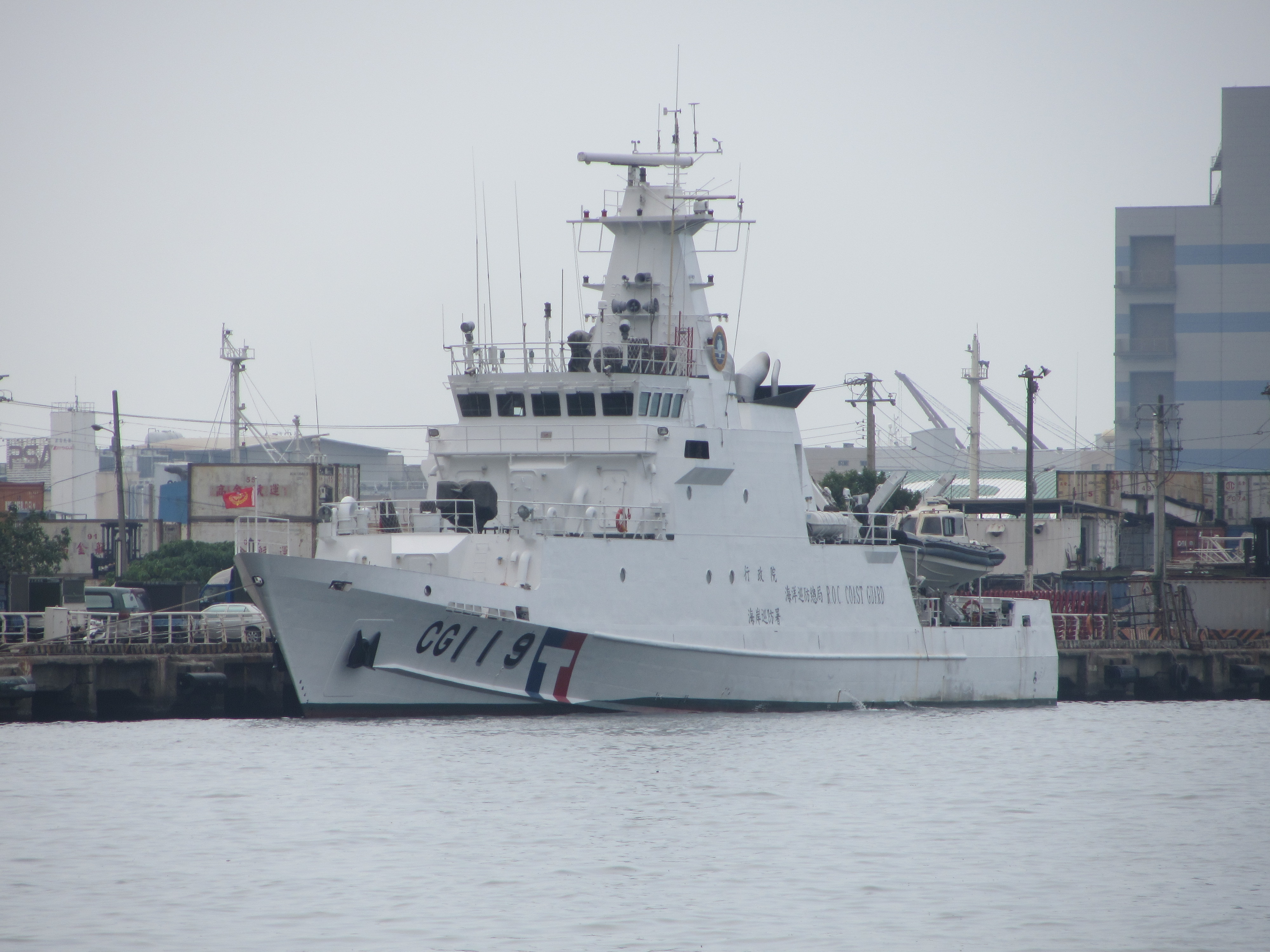
Coast Guard Administration (Taiwan) patrol vessel

The Coast Guard Administration is both a military and a law enforcement organization. The CGA is considered a civilian law enforcement agency under the administration of the Executive Yuan, though during wartime it may be incorporated as part of the ROC military. Its primary roles are ensuring the safety and security of territorial waters and coordinating search and rescue efforts.

The CGA includes a Maritime Patrol Directorate General and a Coast Patrol Directorate General. Officers of the Maritime Patrol Directorate General are law enforcement officials, but officers of the Coast Patrol Directorate General are considered soldiers who have partial law-enforcement power.

=== Trinidad and Tobago ===
The Trinidad and Tobago Coast Guard (TTCG) is the maritime division of the Trinidad and Tobago Defence Force. It is within the government portfolio of the Ministry of National Security. The Commanding Officer of the Coast Guard reports to the Chief of Defence Staff. The TTCG is responsible surveillance, search and rescue, fisheries enforcement, pollution enforcement, and counter-narcotics operations for maritime jurisdiction of Trinidad and Tobago.

=== Turkey ===
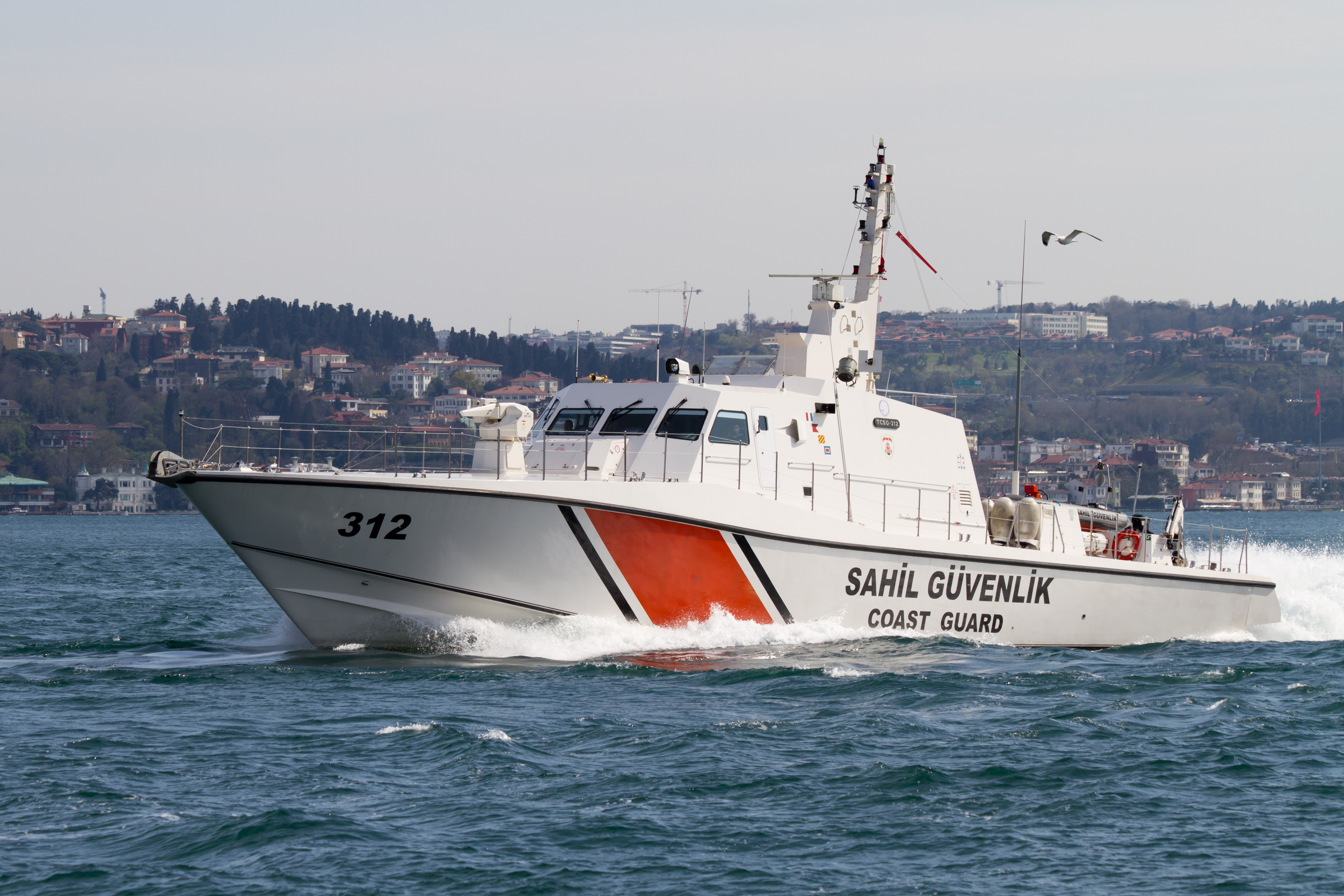
Patrol boat of the Turkish Coast Guard

The Coast Guard Command (CGC) of the Republic of Turkey (Turkish: Sahil Güvenlik Komutanlığı) is a branch of the Turkish Armed Forces and was initially founded in 1859. During peacetime, it is under the command of the Ministry of Interior. However, during war or emergency time, it falls under the command of the Turkish Naval Forces. On July 13, 1982, it was assigned to the Gendarmerie General Command becoming both a military and a law enforcement service. Finally, the organization obtained its current form on January 1, 1985.

The Coast Guard is responsible for enforcement of Turkish maritime law and controlling of the Republic of Turkey's coasts in the responsibility area. It is also the main search and rescue coordination authority for the Turkish coastal zone. The CGC consists of four area commands, as the Black Sea, the Sea of Marmara and adjacent straits, the Aegean Sea, and the Mediterranean Sea.

The Coast Guard Command maintains a fleet of coastal patrol ships and small craft, as well as helicopters and fixed-wing aircraft.

=== Ukraine ===
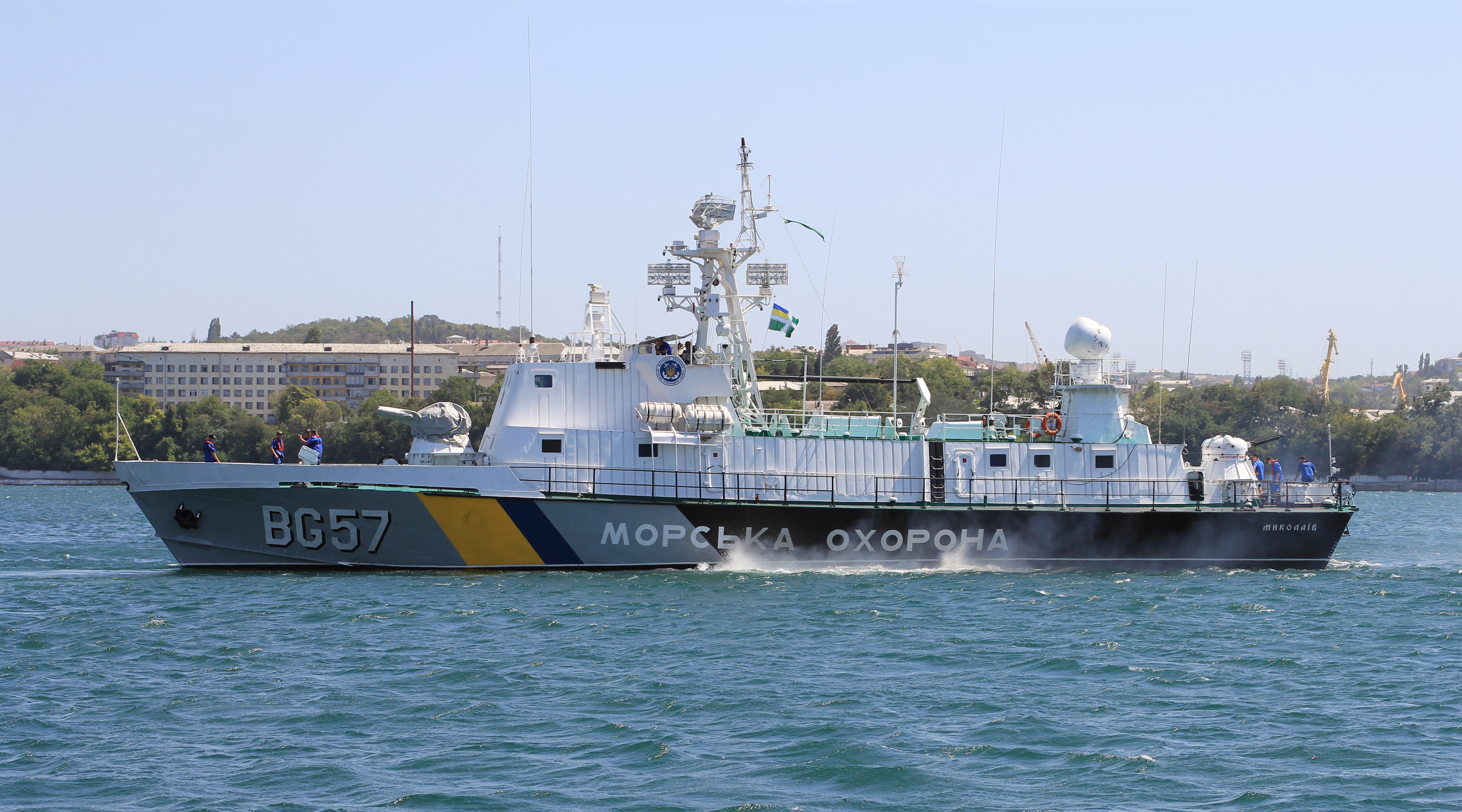
Stenka-class patrol boat BG57 Mykolaiv

Ukrainian Sea Guard is the coast guard service of Ukraine, subordinated to the State Border Guard Service of Ukraine, the local successor of the Soviet Border Troops Naval Units that have been similarly responsible for coast guard tasks. However, there were some interchanges in units, ships and personnel between Sea Guard and the Ukrainian Navy. Operates four sea guard detachment; a sea guard cutters division in Mariupol; a special-purpose sea guard cutters division in Yalta; and a riverine Dnieper sea guard cutters division in Kyiv. Sea guard administration is split between the Azov-Black seas regional administration in Simferopol and the Southern regional administration in Odesa. Service persons of the Sea Guard wear either the black uniform similar to Ukrainian Navy, but decorated with some green elements (traditional for border guard), or a common uniform of the Border Guard.

=== United Kingdom ===
In the United Kingdom, His Majesty's Coastguard fulfill six of the nine functions required by the IMO; Search and Rescue, Pollution Response, Vessel Traffic Management, Maritime Safety, Accident and Disaster Response, and Maritime Security. The other three IMO functions; Customs/Border Control, Fisheries Control and Law Enforcement, are undertaken by the UK Border Force, Environment Agency and local police forces, respectively. The maintenance of seamarks is the responsibility of Trinity House (in England and Wales), the Northern Lighthouse Board (in Scotland) and the Commissioners of Irish Lights (in Northern Ireland). HM Coastguard is a civilian agency - as the duties traditionally associated with a military coast guard service are spread around the Civil Service and British Armed Forces, unlike other coast guard services around the world. It is a Category 1 emergency responder alongside the United Kingdom's regional police, fire, and ambulance services.

Lifeboat services are provided by the Royal National Lifeboat Institution, or other independent lifeboat stations not affiliated with the RNLI, all under the coordination of the Coastguard. HM Coastguard wet leases commercial helicopters — Sikorsky S-92s and AgustaWestland AW189s — to provide aerial search and rescue cover around Great Britain and Northern Ireland, as well as the United Kingdom's emergency towing vessel fleet in areas not served by tug brokers. On the coastline, HM Coastguard maintains a network of cliff and mud rescue teams, comprising around 4,000 volunteers, and can call upon the National Coastwatch Institution which mans many former Coastguard lookout stations around the coast. It is part of the Maritime and Coastguard Agency, which in itself is an executive agency of the Department for Transport.

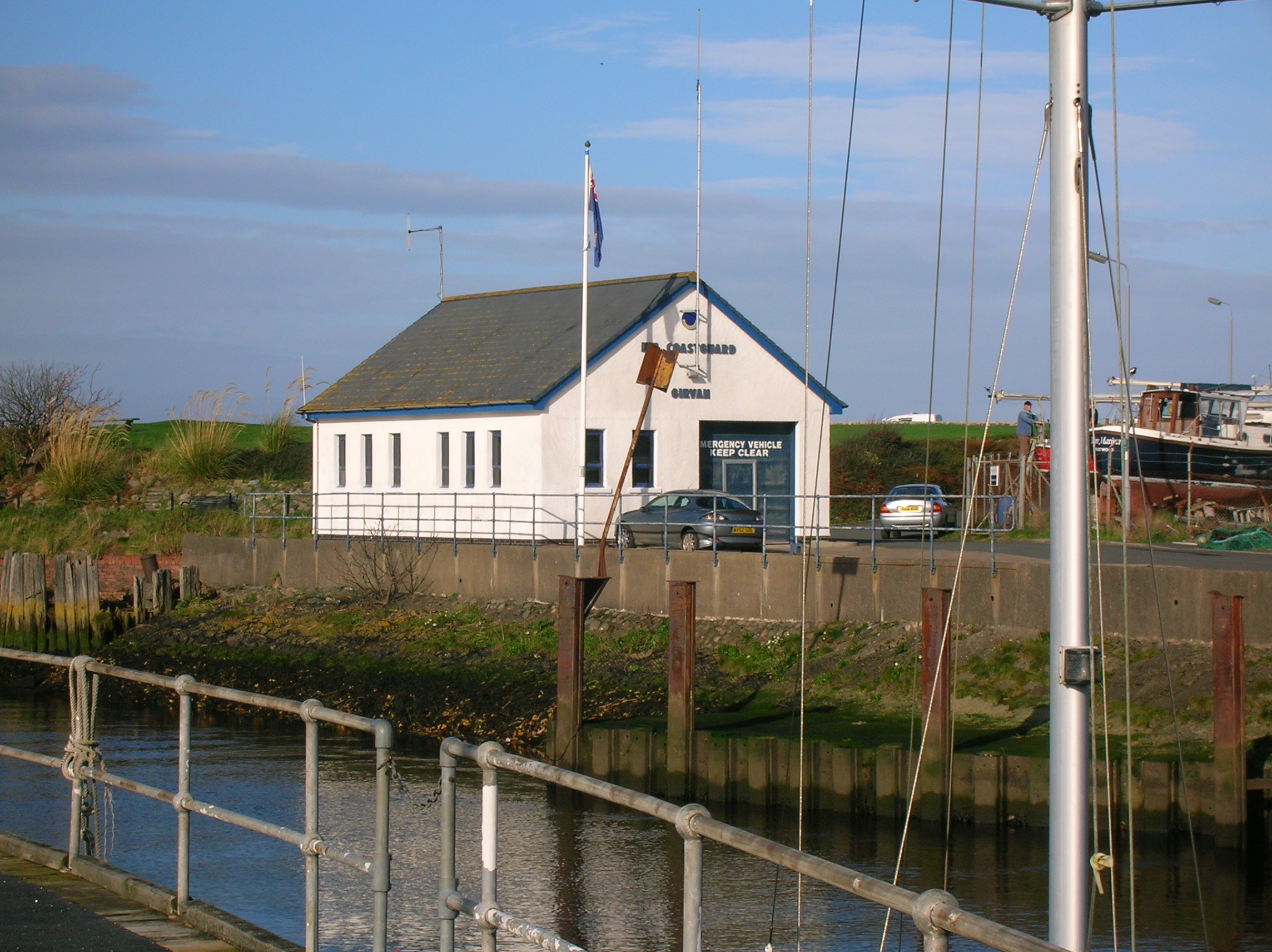
Station building of Girvan Coastguard Rescue Team, on the west coast of Scotland.

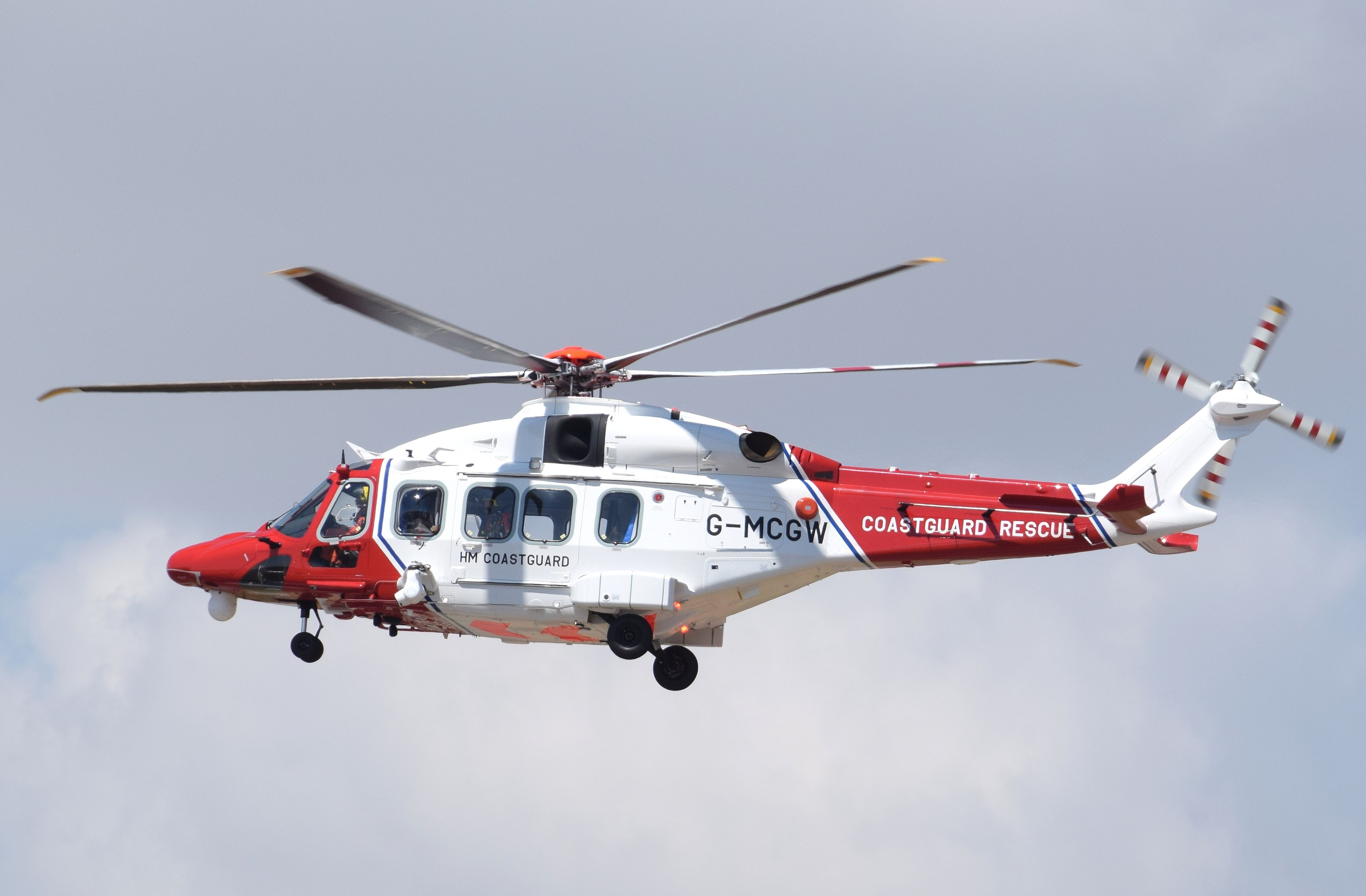
AgustaWestland AW189 in HM Coastguard livery.

==== Scotland ====
The Scottish Fisheries Protection Agency (SFPA) is responsible for both deterring illegal fishing in Scottish waters, as well as monitoring the compliance of the fisheries industry in Scotland with the relevant Scottish and European Union laws on fisheries.

==== British Overseas Territories ====
Royal Bermuda Regiment The Bermuda Regiment Coast Guard is responsible for Maritime Law Enforcement and Search & Rescue in Bermudian Territorial waters. BRCG works in partnership with the Bermuda Police Service.

Cayman Islands Coast Guard The Cayman Islands Coast Guard is responsible for Maritime Law Enforcement and Search & Rescue in Caymanian Territorial waters. CICG works in partnership with Royal Cayman Islands Police Service, Cayman Islands Regiment, Cayman Islands Customs & Border Control, and Cayman Islands Immigration Service.

=== United States ===
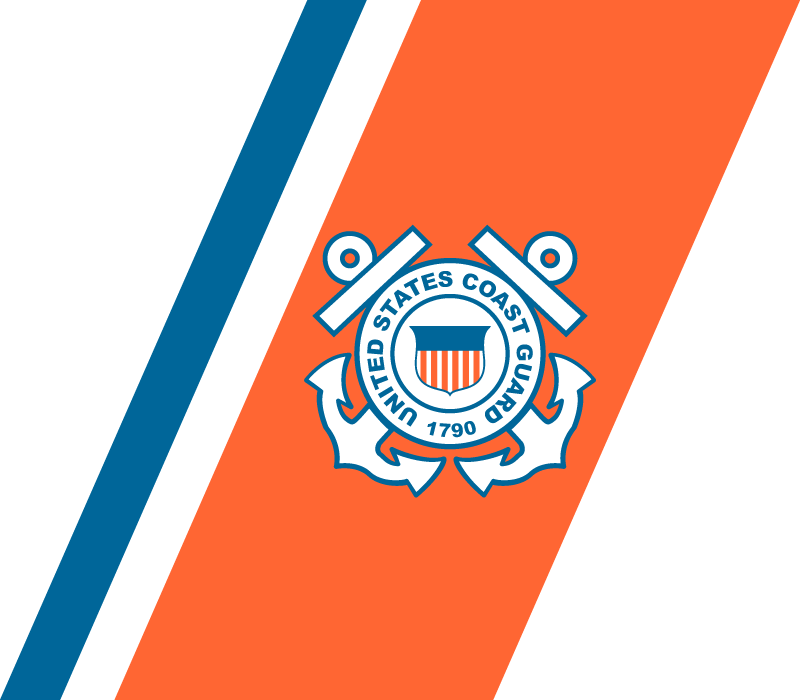
USCG racing stripe

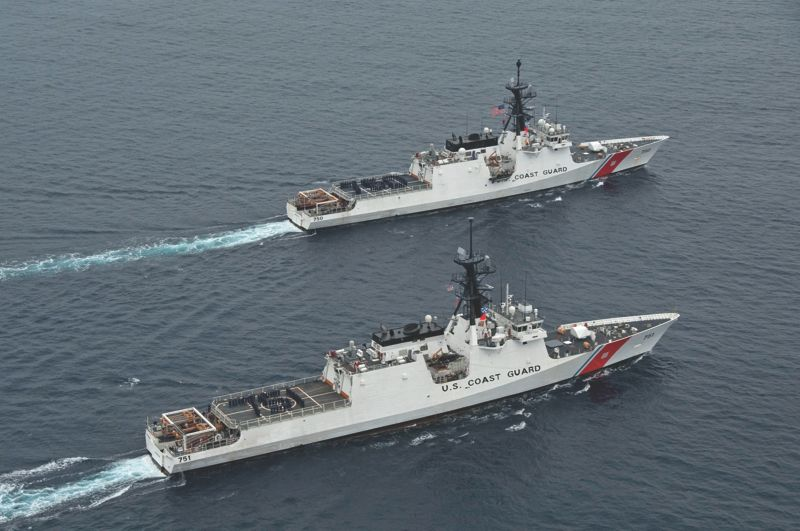
National Security cutters, the USCGC Bertholf and USCGC Waesche, cruise together.

Formed in 1915 by the merger of the United States Revenue Cutter Service (established as the United States Revenue-Marine in 1790 and renamed in 1894) and the United States Life-Saving Service (established in 1848), and later absorbing the United States Lighthouse Service in 1939 and the functions of the Bureau of Marine Inspection and Navigation in 1942 and 1946, the United States Coast Guard (USCG) is a military service, a law enforcement agency, and regulatory agency. It is one of the eight uniformed services of the United States and one of the six services of the United States Armed Forces. Its role includes enforcement of U.S. maritime law, coastal defense, search and rescue, environmental protection, aids to navigation, and regulation of maritime industries.

During peacetime the USCG falls under the administration of the United States Department of Homeland Security (previously the U.S. Department of Transportation, 1967–2003, and the United States Department of the Treasury, 1915–1967). During wartime, the USCG may, at the direction of the president of the United States, report to the Secretary of the Navy; its resources, however, are integrated into U.S. military operations in wartime (see 14 U.S.C. §§ 3–4).

As of 2022, the Coast Guard had 40,757 coast guardsmen on active duty, 6,240 reservists, approximately 26,000 auxiliarists, and over 7,100 full-time civilian employees. The Coast Guard maintains an extensive fleet of 243 coastal and ocean-going patrol ships, tenders, tugs and icebreakers called "Cutters", and 1650 smaller boats, as well as an extensive aviation division consisting of 201 helicopters and fixed-wing aircraft. While the U.S. Coast Guard is next to the smallest of the U.S. armed service branches, in terms of size, the U.S. Coast Guard is the world's largest coast guard.

USCG helicopters are equipped with hoists to rescue survivors and also play a major role in law enforcement. The helicopters are able to land and take off from USCG cutters, making them an indispensable tool in fighting illegal drug traffic and the influx of undocumented immigrants attempting to illegally enter the country. The fixed-wing aircraft are used for long range search and rescue and law enforcement patrols. A construction and repair shipyard has been maintained since 1899 in the Baltimore Harbor area at Curtis Bay, United States Coast Guard Yard at Curtis Bay, Maryland.

Today's lighthouses on the American coasts are all maintained by the U.S. Coast Guard, from the previous old U.S. Lighthouse Service. The list of active light houses, lighted beacons, etc. that provide detailed information on aids to navigation with their locations and characteristic signals is currently maintained by the U.S. Coast Guard in its Light List issued each year.

The USCG has a small service academy, equivalent to both the United States Military Academy and the United States Naval Academy in terms of students earning a 4-year degree and commission upon graduation. The United States Coast Guard Academy is much smaller in size (approx. 1,000 students) and is located at New London, Connecticut. All enlisted coast guardsmen attend boot camp at Cape May, New Jersey.

Several other federal, state and local agencies operate maritime police and security units with law enforcement and search and rescue functions similar to the Coast Guard. Examples include the New Hampshire Marine Patrol and the U.S. Customs and Border Protection, Air and Marine Operations, along with state Naval Militia.

=== Uruguay ===
In the Republic of Uruguay, the Coast Guard (Spanish: Prefectura Nacional Naval-PRENA) is a part of the National Navy of Uruguay. It is tasked with the broader enforcement of maritime laws, especially against smuggling, illegal fishing, drug trafficking and piracy. It patrols the country's coastline, and is also involved in maritime search and rescue (SAR) missions, as well as the protection of the marine environment. The Uruguayan Coast Guard also frequently patrols coast areas via-foot and on patrol vehicles which they are assigned jurisdictions which are called Subprefecturas. Prefectura is also responsible for the International Port of Montevideo operability. Even though the Uruguayan Coast Guard is a military organization, they frequently help out law enforcement agencies

It must also maintain the safety of navigation and be a maritime authority on rivers, the Atlantic Ocean, the River Plate, and lakes in the jurisdiction of the Navy and intervene in the flagging of vessels.

In 2015, there are plans for the Uruguayan Coast Guard to pass and depend entirely on the Ministry of the Interior, meaning it would not be a military unit anymore.

=== Vietnam ===
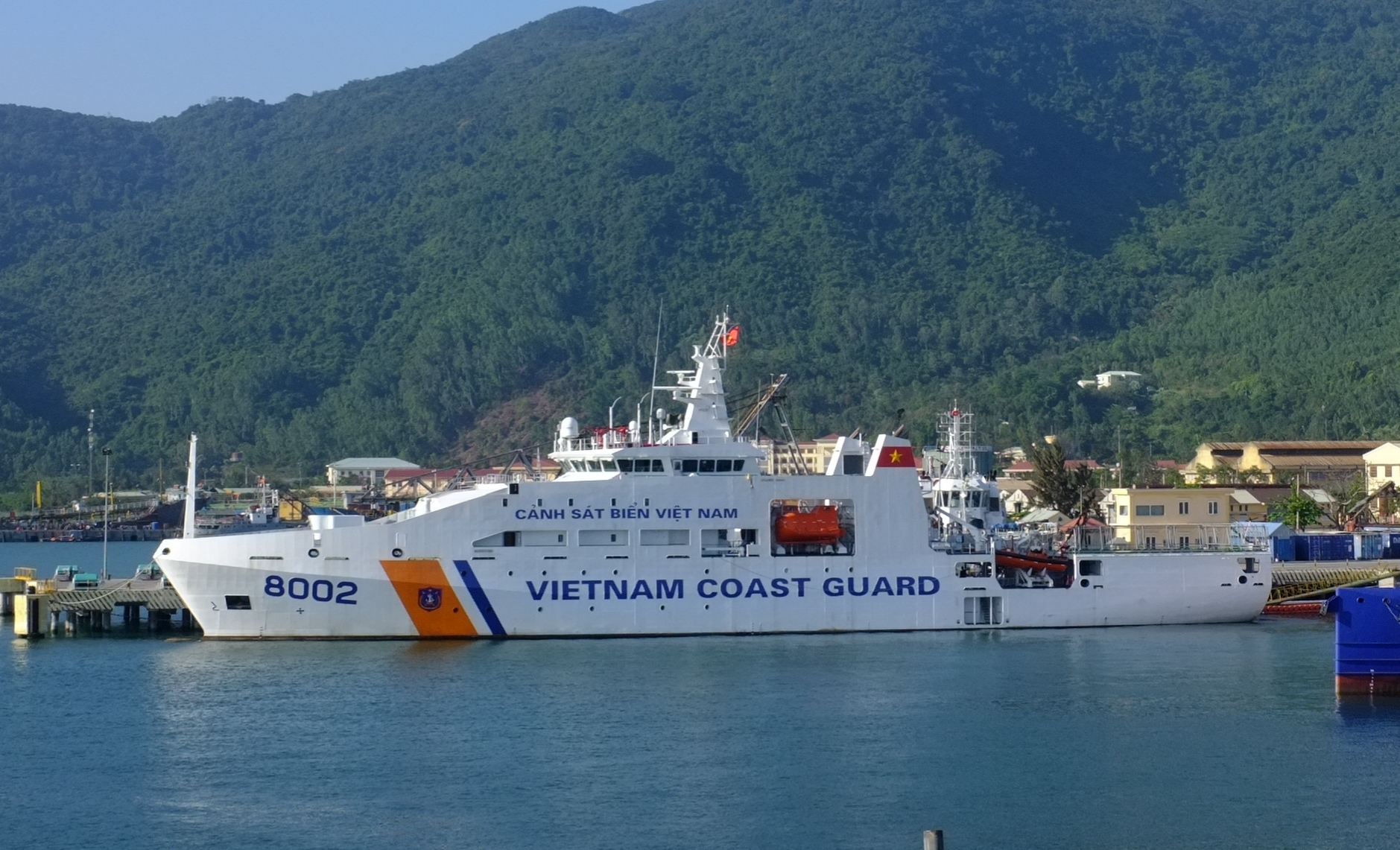
An offshore patrol vessel of Vietnam Coast Guard.

Vietnam Coast Guard (VCG; Vietnamese: Cảnh sát biển Việt Nam) is directly under the administration of the Vietnamese Government, and it patrols and controls in accordance with the laws of the Socialist Republic of Vietnam and international treaties concerned such as the United Nations Convention on the Law of the Sea (UNCLOS). Besides maritime search and rescue (SAR) missions, Vietnam Coast Guard missions include protection the sovereignty and jurisdiction of the waters of Vietnam; protection of natural resources; prevention of environmental pollution; detection and prevention of acts of smuggling, piracy and illegal transportation and trafficking of illegal narcotics or precursors.

Besides the mentioned "official coast guard", Vietnam also organizes an alternative maritime law enforcement force, which is the Vietnam Fisheries Surveillance. While theoretically focusing at counter illegal fishing behaviors and administer fisheries activities in the Vietnamese water corresponding to its name, the Fisheries Surveillance also shares VCG's missions to perform SAR and represents Vietnam's national interest and sovereignty exercises in the sea with its strong fleet of more than 100 medium-sized patrol vessels.

== See also ==
- Border guard
- Chief Coastguard
- Maritime Security Regimes
- Port security
