= École du service public de la mer =

French maritime administration school

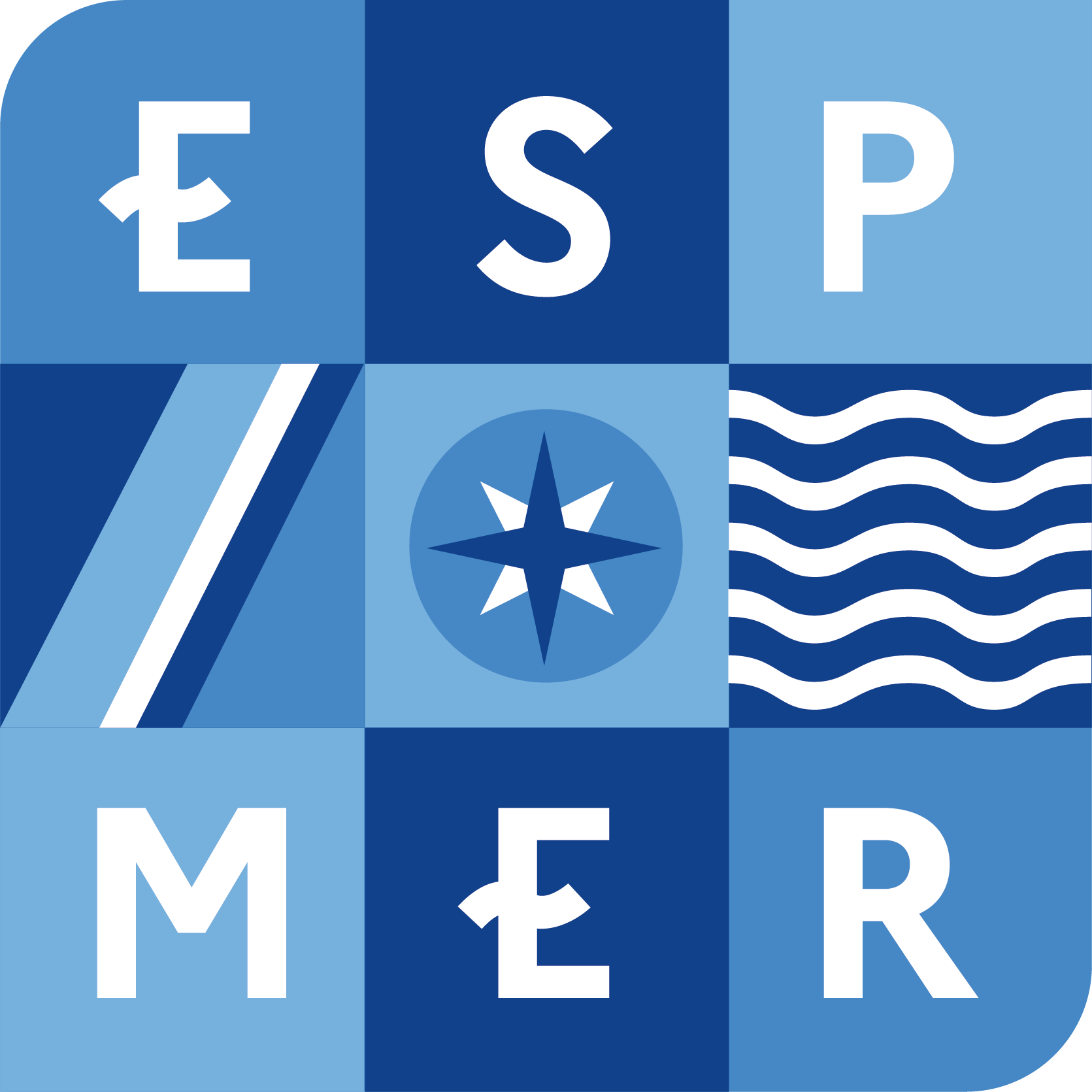

The École du service public de la mer, (Public Maritime Service School) is a Grande Ecole of the French Ministry of the Sea. It trains civil and military officers for the Directorate general for Maritime affairs, Fisheries and Aquaculture. This school is currently located in Le Havre, within the campus of the French Maritime Academy “École nationale supérieure maritime”, since September 2021 when it moved from the former site in Nantes.

== Programs ==
In this school are trained both military officers and civil servants in the administrative, operational and technical fields of the maritime administration:

- The Administrateur des Affaires maritimes are a military corps trained and intended to work in MRCC or in executive positions responsible for monitoring public policies within the French maritime administration.
- The Ingénieur des Travaux Publics de l'Etat (ITPE) recruited among the engineering students of the ENTPE (French engineering school for the technical civil servants) and trained for the position of Marine Surveyor in the Centres de Sécurité des Navires (Ship Safety Center), where they work both as Flag surveyors and auditors (ISM, ISPS, MLC) for ships under the French Flag and also as Port State Control Officers for foreign vessels calling to French ports.

Within the framework of cooperation, the school also trains civil and military officers for the maritime administration of foreign countries, especially from Africa (Congo, Madagascar, Comoros ...).

== See also ==
- Port state control
- Rescue coordination centre
- ENTPE
- Ship registration
