= Marine surveyor =

Person who inspects, surveys, or examines marine vessels

A marine surveyor (also referred to as a "yacht & small craft surveyor", "gasoline engine surveyor", diesel engine surveyor", "hull & machinery surveyor" and/or "cargo surveyor") is a person who inspects, surveys, or examines marine vessels in order to assess damage, inspect aberrations, or monitor their condition and that of any cargo on board. Marine surveyors also inspect equipment intended for new or existing vessels to ensure compliance with various standards or specifications. Marine surveys typically include the structure, machinery, and equipment (navigational, safety, radio, etc.) in addition to the general condition of a vessel and/or cargo. They also involve judging materials on board and their condition. Though a largely unregulated profession, marine surveyors are generally trained specifically for the role and usually selected after thorough evaluation procedures. Their duties apply to a wide range of seafaring vessels.

Marine surveying is closely associated with marine insurance, damage and salvage, and accident and fraud investigation as insurers generally rely on the specific training and skills of a marine surveyor to perform a detailed assessment of the condition of a vessel. Marine surveyors may be hired on a fee basis by customers seeking insurance directly and maintain professional autonomy in order to provide an unbiased view. Independent marine surveyors are often employed by the clients of marine insurers to provide evidence in support of damage claims made against the insurer. Insurance companies cannot require customers to use specific marine surveyors and risk legal scrutiny and potential recourse if they impose surveyor requirements.

Marine surveyors use many credentials, letters, and terms such as "accredited," "certified," "qualified," "USSA," "ACMS," "AMS," "CMS," etc. There are many ways to train to become a marine surveyor including taking correspondence courses, apprenticing, and/or utilizing prior marine experience. Marine surveyors pursue their profession independently of required organizations, and there is currently no national or international licensing requirement for marine surveyors. The United States Coast Guard U.S. Coast Guard does not approve or certify marine surveyors; National Association of Marine Surveyors was founded in 1962 and requires members to adhere to strict survey guidelines. All association terms and initials represent training and certification by private organizations, and the end users of boats seeking to comply with their insurance company's underwriting process dictate surveyor demand.

== Qualities and qualifications ==
Marine surveying continues to be a largely unregulated industry, allowing individuals from various backgrounds to practice as surveyors. The profession generally involves a working knowledge of the ship's electrical and mechanical systems, and a fundamental understanding of boat design and construction. Moreover, it is customary for marine surveyors to carry errors and omissions insurance, also referred to as professional indemnity insurance, as a form of protection against potential liabilities.

A marine surveyor who is a member of a professional body such as the Society of Accredited Marine Surveyors (USA) or the International Institute of Marine Surveying is more likely to be hired by a client.

When it comes to defining the qualities and qualifications of a marine surveyor, a memorandum of 1834 states:

“The utmost care and discrimination have been exercised by the Committee in the selection of men [and women] of talent, integrity, and firmness as Surveyors, on whom the practical efficacy of the system and the contemplated advantages must so materially depend; the Committee has in their judgment appointed those persons only…who appeared to them to be most competent to discharge the important duties of their situations with fidelity and ability, and to ensure strict and impartial justice to all parties whose property shall come under their supervision.”

— Classification societies – their key role – IACS, 2012

== General duties of a Classification Society marine surveyor ==
A marine surveyor may perform the following tasks:

- Conduct surveys throughout the ship's life (building new ship, annual survey, interim survey, special survey) to ensure standards are maintained;
- Perform inspections required by domestic statutes and international conventions by the International Maritime Organization (IMO);
- Witness tests and operation of emergency and safety machinery and equipment;
- Measure ships for tonnage and survey them for load line assignment;
- Attend court as an expert witness and assist in coroner's inquiries;
- Investigate marine accidents;
- Determine "Fair Market Value", "Damage Repair Costs", and "Replacement Value".

== Types of marine surveyor ==
=== Government surveyor ===
A government surveyor performs ship registration surveys, surveys of foreign-going ships and local draft, and generally enforces ship safety standards to ensure marine industrial safety. Government-appointed marine surveyors, also called marine inspectors in some countries, belong to two groups that are not mutually exclusive: Flag State surveyors report to the government with whom the vessel is registered, and Port State surveyors report to the government into whose territory the vessel has entered. The Port State surveyors usually have the authority to detain vessels considered to have defects that may result in adverse impacts on life or the environment. Based on their government's legal framework, Flag State surveyors can impose conditions on the vessel such that failure to comply will result in the registration of the vessel being suspended or withdrawn. In this event, the vessel will find it almost impossible to trade.

=== Cargo surveyor ===
A Cargo surveyor is normally appointed by the Cargo Owner, usually for bulk/grain cargo. Their job is to perform a draft survey to determine the actual cargo loaded on board. They also confirm that the cargo loading is performed according to the law and is within the loadable limits. The vessel's safety is also assessed by the surveyor, which includes minimizing momentum due to cargo shift, which may render the vessel unsafe during the passage. An example of cargo surveyor is INSPECTION BUREAU [IB] @ www.inspection-bureau.com

=== Classification surveyor ===
A classification surveyor inspects ships to make sure that the ship, its components, and machinery are built and maintained according to the standards required for their class. Classification surveyors generally have two roles: one is a representative of the classification society; and the other as an inspector on behalf of the country with which the vessel is registered (the flag state). The classification role is to ensure that during construction the vessel initially complies with the classification society's rules for construction and outfitting, and thereafter is maintained fit to proceed with trading. The Flag State role is based on a clear set of guidelines issued by the registering country. On satisfactory completion of any survey, the classification surveyor makes recommendations to the classification society and/or the flag state. These may be that the vessel has a clean bill of health, or that various defects must be corrected within a given time.

Increasingly, both government and classification surveyors are becoming involved in confirming compliance with international treaties associated with such concerns as pollution, international security, and safety management schemes. They may also examine cargo gear to ensure that it meets various requirements or regulations. Government and classification surveyors are usually marine professionals, such as a qualified ship's master, engineer, naval architect or radio officer.

=== Independent surveyor ===
An independent marine surveyor may be asked to carry out a wide range of tasks, including examining a ship's cargo or onboard conditions such as fuel quality; investigating accidents at sea (e.g., oil spillages or failure of machinery or structures which are not considered to be critical); and preparing accident reports for insurance purposes, and conducting draught surveys to analyze how much cargo has been lost or gained.

Independent surveyors also carry out condition surveys or per-purchase surveys (also known as "Condition and valuation" surveys (C&V)) to determine the condition of the ship prior to charter or an acquisition. Many companies, ship-owners, brokers, etc. employ or contract the services of a private marine surveyor in order to determine the condition of the ship. An example of marine and cargo surveyor worldwide is INSPECTION BUREAU [IB], www.inspection-bureau.com

=== Yacht and small craft surveyor ===
Yacht and small craft (Y&SC) surveyors specialize in inspecting smaller vessels, typically less than 24 metres, that are most often used for pleasure boating (both power and sail). Y&SC surveyors may be employed directly by larger marine insurance companies, but most often they are independent practitioners engaged directly by the boating public. Since using boats for pleasure (or "yachting") is a relatively recent phenomenon, having only been widely practiced for the last century or so, Y&SC surveying has many unique aspects that are not shared with the more traditional forms of marine surveying described above. In the UK, the Yacht Designers and Surveyors' Association has a broad professional membership dealing with the range of craft below and above 24 metres (excluding ships and cargo/container ships). The International Institute of Marine Surveying is the leading worldwide professional body for the marine surveying profession and has over 1,000 members in more than 100 countries. The Institute provides regular face-to-face and online training seminars for both members and non-members at various UK and overseas locations. It is ISO 9001 certified by DNV with a scope of 'Training services in marine surveying'.

=== MCA coding surveyor ===
All UK vessels in commercial use up to 24 metres load line length, which go to sea, are required by law to comply with one of the Maritime and Coastguard Agency (MCA) Small Craft Codes. The Workboat 3 Code came into regulation on 13 December 2023. More recently, the Sport or Pleasure Vessel code became law on 12 December 2025. Existing vessels may be coded under the stringent requirements of MGN 280 code, or one of the other specialist small craft codes, but new vessels being coded must adopt the new Sport or Pleasure Vessel code. Vessels are issued with license certificates by one of several UK Certifying Authorities that are approved under contract by the MCA. Code surveyors have been interviewed, assessed, and authorized as being competent by the Certifying Authorities, which include organizations such as the International Institute of Marine Surveying.

== Marine surveyor training ==
There are very few institutions providing education and training in this specialized field. One such organization is the International Institute of Marine Surveying (IIMS), a professional body that has been providing surveyor education courses for nearly 20 years. The IIMS provides Diploma Professional Qualification courses in both yacht and small craft as well as commercial ship surveying. The IIMS membership consists of marine surveyors, cargo surveyors, yacht and small craft surveyors and other professionals in the field. IIMS has developed a specialist standalone training portal . There are over 150 short and long courses available to study from marine corrosion to lithium-ion batteries, synthetic rigging, and much more. Suny Maritime College provides online survey classes in Cargo, Hull and Yacht and small craft.

In Australia, the Australasian Institute of Marine Surveyors has the first accredited course under the Mar 13 training package which meets the requirements for AMSA Accreditation. They offer Certificate 4 to Diploma level qualifications. Lloyd's Maritime Academy offers a Diploma and MSc in Marine Surveying by distance learning since 1998 with the UK National Maritime Training Centre at the North Kent College in Gravesend and Middlesex University. Maritime Training Academy offers a large number of industry recognized vocational distance learning diplomas to students within the marine industry, which includes marine surveyors.

== See also ==
- National Association of Marine Surveyors
- Vessel safety survey
