= General Inspectorate of Maritime Affairs =

General Inspectorate of Maritime Affairs (Inspection générale des affaires maritimes) is a French General Inspectorate in the areas of the sea. The office is placed under the authority of the State Secretariat for the Sea.

== Mission ==
The General Inspectorate of Maritime Affairs informs and advises the ministers, in particular the ministers in charge of the armed forces, ecological transition, agriculture and food sovereignty, overseas territories, for the exercise of their powers in the areas of the sea. On their behalf, it carries out a general inspection mission which relates to the regularity, quality and efficiency of the action of the services with competence in the fields of the sea, as well as an advisory mission for the operation of the services.

The Inspectorate helps to monitor and guide maritime affairs administrators and maritime education teachers. The Inspector General exercises the function of Chief of the Corps of Maritime Affairs Administrators as well as the function of Chief of the Corps of Instructors of Maritime Education.

== Organization ==
The Inspectorate is headed by the Inspector General of Maritime Affairs and includes an Inspector General of Maritime Education who is responsible for organizing the missions of the General Inspectorate in the field of maritime education.

- Inspector General of Maritime Affairs: Guillaume Sellier, Senior Administrator General of Maritime Affairs
- Inspector General of Maritime Education: Laurent Galy, Professor General 2nd Class
- Direction of the Corps of Maritime Affairs Administrators, under the Inspector General
- Maritime Education Inspection, under the Inspector General of Maritime Education
- Inspections and Audits, under Marc Chapalain, Administrator General of Maritime Affairs 2nd Class
