= French Corps of Instructors of Maritime Education =

The French Corps of Instructors of Maritime Education (Les Corps des Professeurs de l’enseignement maritime) is a corps of career officers of the French Navy. The primary mission for members of the Corps is teaching and educational administration.

== Status ==
The Corps of Instructors of Maritime Education constitutes a corps of career officers of the French Navy. This Corps is administered by the ministry responsible for the sea. Recruitment and admission into the Corps have not been carried out since 1 January 2009. The Corps should eventually be integrated into the Corps of Maritime Affairs Administrators, which has taken over the functions of maritime education and training in maritime establishments.

== Mission ==
The primary mission for members of the Corps is teaching at the École nationale supérieure maritime (ENSM). They also perform administrative and management functions at the ENSM, in the maritime vocational high schools and participate in the operation of the central administration.

== Ranks and rank insignia ==
Ranks in the general naval hierarchy	Ranks in the Corps of Instructors of Maritime Education	Rank insignia
Vice-amiral	Professur général de 1re classe	
Contre-amiral	Professeur général de 2e classe	
Capitaine de vaisseau	Professeur en chef de 1re classe	
Capitaine de frégate	Professeur en chef de 2e classe	
Capitaine de corvette	Professeur principal	
