= MISLE =

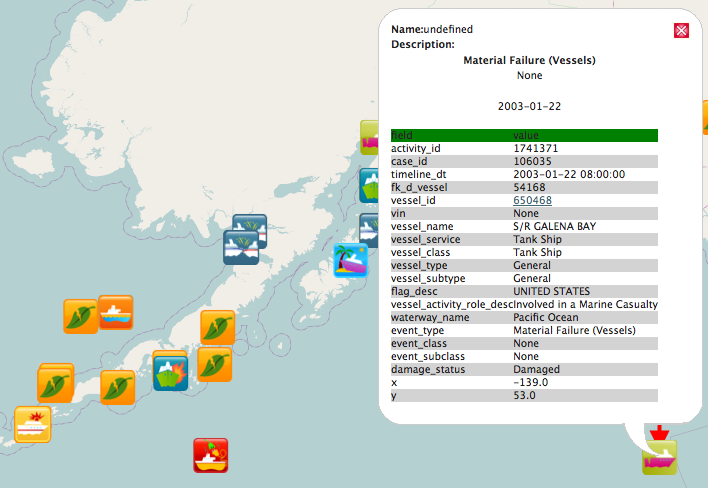
Public incident data from 2001 to 2010 in south central Alaska over an OpenStreetMap base

The Marine Information for Safety and Law Enforcement (MISLE) is a database system managed and used by the United States Coast Guard (USCG). The MISLE is used to store data on marine accidental and deliberate pollution and other shipping and port accidents in US territorial waters. It accounts for vessels and other facilities, like port terminals and shipyards. The system has now been operational for a few years. It was introduced in December 2001 to replace the previous Marine Safety Information System (MSIS).

The public may access portions of the data contained on the MISLE system through the Port State Information eXchange (PSIX). Originally, the PSIX system was designed to provide other countries with Port State Intervention data on foreign-flagged vessels. Currently, it contains information on over 650,000 U.S. and foreign flagged vessels (including those used for recreational purposes). The PSIX system contains vessel specific information derived from the United States Coast Guard's Marine Information Safety and Law Enforcement System (MISLE). The information contained in PSIX represents a weekly snapshot of Freedom of Information Act (FOIA) data on U.S. flag vessels, foreign vessels operating in U.S. waters, and Coast Guard contacts with those vessels. Information on unclosed cases or cases pending further action is considered privileged information and is precluded from the PSIX system.
