= Marc Fontoynont =

Professor in illumination engineering at Aalborg University

- Born: 20 March 1956 (age 70); Lyon, France

Academic background
- Education: ENTPE (BA); University of California, Berkeley (MSc); Mines Paris – PSL (PhD)

Academic work
- Institutions: Aalborg University

Marc Fontoynont is French academic who has been professor in the Danish national building research institute (SBI) at Aalborg University in Copenhagen, Denmark and Ecole nationale des travaux publics de l’Etat (ENTPE) in Lyon, France. He led research energy efficient lighting, window and shading systems, innovative electric lighting and lighting quality assessment using visual psychometric tests.

Fontoynont was involved in the lighting design of the Salle des Etats. He led a team that developed a light projector using 7 color LEDs to improve the rendering of the painting Mona Lisa. He also coordinated the development of a new version of the lamp, using 32 color channels.

Fontoynont has been coordinator of European research programs related to daylighting of buildings. He was appointed by the International Energy Agency to act as coordinator of the task IEA 4E SSL-Quality assurance of LEDs. He also acted as convenor of the CEN standardization work group CEN TC189-WG11 “Daylight”.

== Early life and education ==
Born in Lyon, France on March 20, 1956, Fontoynont studied civil engineering, specializing in building sciences. He obtained his BA in Civil Engineering at the National School of State Public Works (ENTPE) in Lyon in 1980. In 1981, he obtained a Masters of Sciences in Mechanical Engineering at the University of California, Berkeley. Then he moved back to France to get his PhD in Energetics from Ecole Nationale Supérieure des Mines de Paris in 1987. He became a professor in 1992 with the Habilitation to lead Research obtained from University of Savoie in Chambéry.

== Career ==
From 1983 to 1995, Fontoynont pursued research activities dealing with energy efficient lighting strategies, focusing on both daylighting optimization and development of energy efficient electric lighting solutions. Starting in 1990, he studied the Climate-based daylight modelling (CBDM) and led the European program "Satel-Light". From 1995 until 2005, he participated at the development of field testing procedures, including low vision testing. In 1996 he wrote “Properties of glazings for daylighting applications", the final report of the EU Joule project and proposed techniques to characterize daylight performance of buildings on site.

Starting in 2000, Fontoynont has been studying the development and use of calibrated photorealistic imaging for lighting quality assessment, with high-resolution displays, Virtual reality (VR) and Augmented reality (AR) experiences. From 2011 to 2021, he has been professor with special assignment at the Department of Energy and Environment in the Danish national building research institute at Aalborg University.

From 2014 to 2021, Fontoynont was Convenor of CEN TC 169-WG 11 Daylight, at CEN, European Standardization. He co-founded the Masters in lighting design' at Aalborg University which won the "best International Lighting education award", at PLDC in 2017.

Fontoynont is the vice-president at the European Lighting Cluster Alliance since 2012. Since 2005, he works as international consultant, as President of Light & Innovation in France. He manages open innovation seminars in lighting, value creation and strategic development.

In 2018, Fontoynont created VisualSense, a company proposing visual experiences with calibrated photorealistic images to involve stakeholders and users in decisions about lighting. He is president of the company.

== Awards ==
- Fresnel Medal and the Alfred Monnier Lighting Awards (France)
- Winner of international competition to light the room of Mona Lisa in Louvre Museum in Paris (2005). He has led a consortium to design a revolutionary lamp, using cluster of 32 LEDs, to light again Mona Lisa in 2013.
- Nomination for the ELFORSK Prize 2017 (Denmark) for best innovative service related with energy performance (using VR solution) with Anders Lumbye and Anne Bay.
- 2017 Best International Lighting education, PLDC award 2017, Masters of Lighting Design, AAU Denmark

=== Books ===
- Building with Daylight, Construire avec la Lumière Naturelle, CSTB Publishers, 2010, with Michel Perraudeau and Pascale Avouac
- Co-author of: Michel Deleuil, « Eclairer la ville autrement ( Innovation and field testing of outdoor lighting installations) », Presses polytechniques et universitaires romandes, Swizzerland, 2009
- Co-author of: «Energy efficient lighting in buildings », International Energy Agency, Annex 45, 2009.
- Daylighting Performance of Buildings , James and James Publishers, London, 1997.
- Daylight design of building Taylor & Francis Lt
- Construire avec la lumière naturelle, Centre Scientifique et Technique du Bâtiment (CSTB), Pascale Avouac, Marc Fontoynont, Michel Perraudeau
- Co-author, Leds / The new Revolution in Lighting, Compte-rendus de l’Académie des Sciences, Paris, Elsevier Publisher, 2018
- Co-author, Daylight in Buildings, Lawrence Berkeley Laboratory Publications, LBNL 47493, US
