= Chantal Bouloux =

French politician (born 1961)

Member of the National Assembly for Côtes-d'Armor's 2nd constituency
- In office 5 August 2022 – 9 June 2024
- Preceded by: Hervé Berville
- Succeeded by: Hervé Berville

Deputy Mayor of Dinan for Social Affairs and Health
- Incumbent
- Assumed office 26 May 2020
- Mayor: Didier Lechien

Personal details
- Born: 23 June 1961 (age 64) Lamballe, France
- Party: Renaissance
- Profession: Manager, Ehpad

Chantal Bouloux (French pronunciation: [ʃɑ̃tal bulu]; born 23 June 1961) is a French politician. Substitute for Hervé Berville, she served as a deputy in the National Assembly for the second constituency of Côtes-d'Armor from 2022 to 2024.

== Biography ==
Chantal Bouloux is Director of the Pleslin-Trigavou home for dependent elderly people (Ehpad), in the Dinan intercommunity (Côtes-d'Armor). She is also a member of the Board of Directors of the Centre communal d'action sociale (CCAS) in Dinan.

She was elected Dinan municipal council in the 2020 municipal elections, on the list of outgoing mayor Didier Lechien. She is appointed Deputy for Social Affairs and Health.

She joins the Renaissance group.
