= YSB =

YSB or YSb may refer to:

- YSB (magazine)
- Yonsei School of Business
- Sudbury Airport
- Yacht Safety Bureau
- Yokohama Specie Bank
- Yttrium(III) antimonide
