= Centres de Sécurité des Navires =

Specialised service of French Directorate General

The Ships Safety Centers or in French "Centres de Sécurité des Navires" are specialized services of the French Directorate general for Maritime affairs, Fisheries and Aquaculture. They are responsible for ships surveying and participate in the protection of human life at sea and the prevention of pollution from ships. They are located along the French coast and overseas. Within these centers, ship safety inspectors are responsible for both surveys of French flag vessels (as Flag State surveyor) and of foreign vessels under Port State Control.

== Missions ==
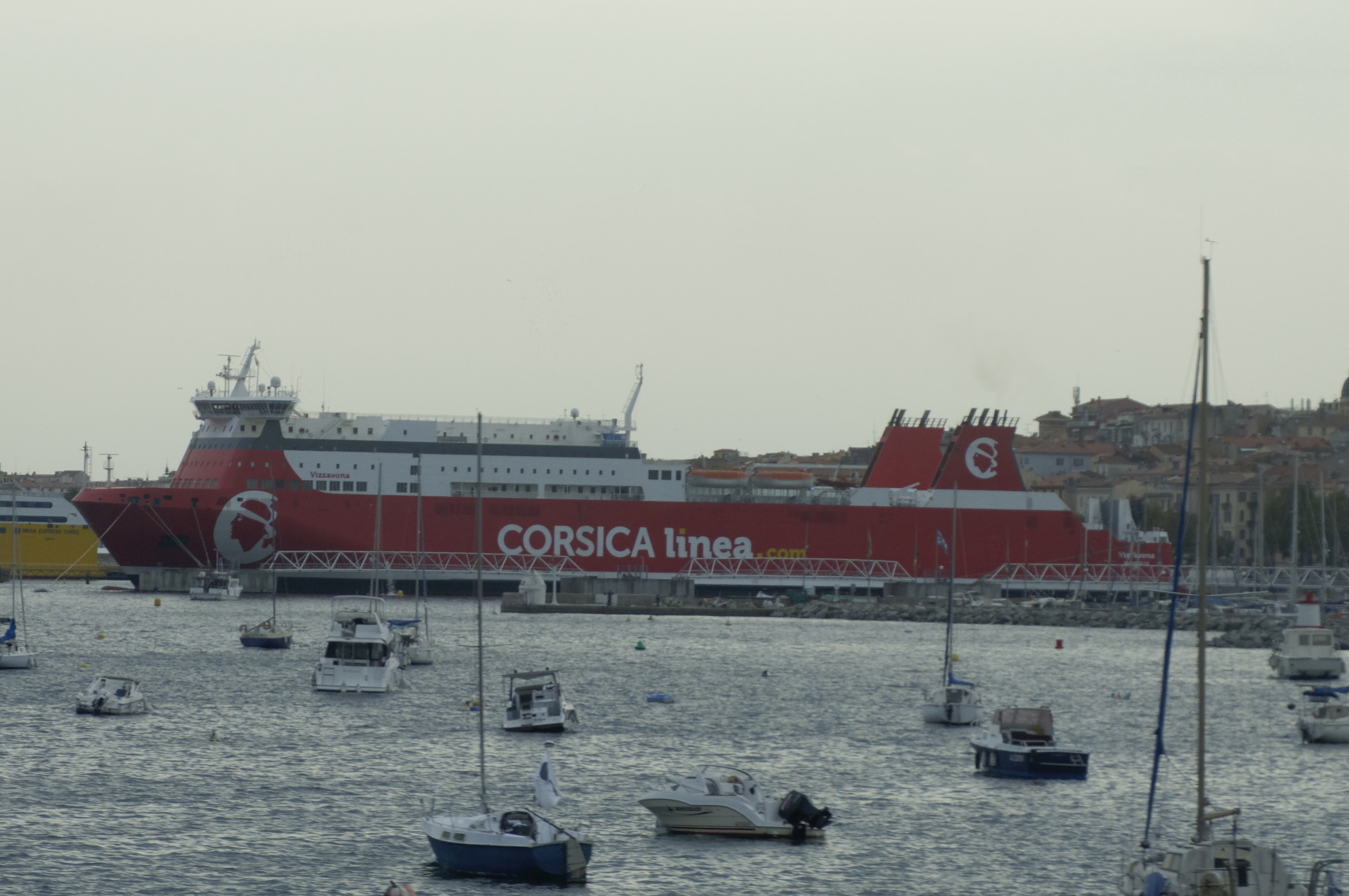
The French ferry Vizzavona in Ajaccio (Corsica)

For vessels under the French flag, the inspectors are responsible for monitoring construction, commissioning and periodic safety surveys for vessels not delegated to authorized classification societies such as Bureau Veritas or RINA. These are currently passenger ships regardless of their size (ferry to Corsica or the English Channel, cruise ships, shuttles to the coastal islands) as well as ships less than 24 m in length, this mainly involves fishing vessels, pleasure craft for commercial use and support vessels (tugboats, pilot boats, dredges). To carry out these inspections, the inspectors base themselves on the technical standards published by the French maritime administration as well as IMO international conventions such as SOLAS or MARPOL for larger ships. Ship safety inspectors are also responsible for auditing and issuing certificates on all French vessels with a tonnage greater than 500 GT for ISM (safety management), ISPS (security management) as well as MLC (social certification).

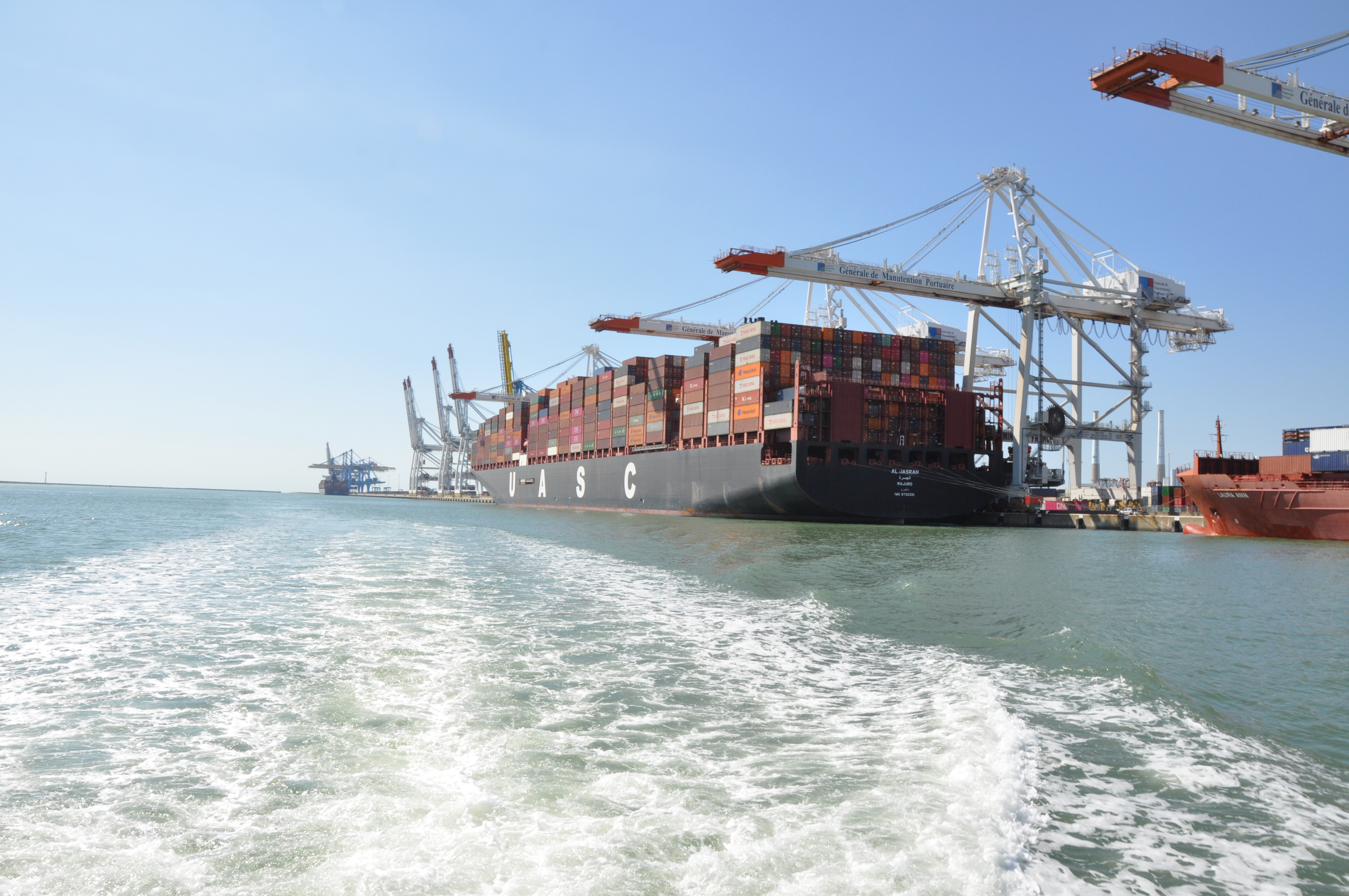
Container ship registered in Marshall Islands at the Port of Le Havre and subject to Port State Control inspection

Inspectors from ship safety centers are Port State Control Officer for the Paris Mou. As such, inspectors visit foreign ships touching French ports and check the conformity of ship and seafarer certificates (STCW), check the proper functioning of safety equipment (fire, rescue, GMDSS, etc.), and those related to pollution prevention (OWS, ballast), they also ensure the respect of social conditions of seafarers (cleanliness of the premises, prevention of accidents and working hours on board). In the event of a serious breach, the vessel may be detained until the deficiencies identified are corrected. In 2018, 1073 PSC inspections were carried out, more than half of them revealed deficiencies on board and 35 ships were detained in French ports. These inspections concern all types of cargo ships, commercial yachts as well as passenger ships. The inspectors also carry out checks on the compliance of the fuels used by ships with regard to international regulations concerning sulfur content, for this, samples are taken by inspectors for laboratory analysis or by using drones

== Inspectors ==
The inspectors working in Ships Safety Center belong to the French Civil Service, they are either members of a military corps "Administrateurs des affaires maritimes" or the technical corps of the "Ingénieurs des Travaux Publics de l'Etat". These inspectors are trained in the specialized school "École nationale de la sécurité et de l'administration de la mer" and through training sessions organized by the European Maritime Safety Agency.

== See also ==
- Flag state
- Marine surveyor
- Port state control
- European Maritime Safety Agency
- IMO
