= Ensam =

Ensam or ENSAM may refer to:

- École nationale supérieure d'arts et métiers, former name of Arts et Métiers ParisTech
- École nationale de la sécurité et de l'administration de la mer, a grande école for the French maritime administration
- Ensam, an 1886 play by Swedish writer Alfhild Agrell
- Frida ensam, a 1975 album by Anni-Frid Lyngstad
- Alone (Strindberg novella) (Swedish: Ensam), a 1903 novella by Swedish writer August Strindberg
