= Ship oil pollution emergency plan =

Oil spill emergency response plan

The Shipboard Oil Pollution Emergency Plan, or SOPEP, is a prevention plan carried on board tankers >150 GT and other vessels >400 GT. In this plan you get an overview of possible procedures in case of an oil spill. In the plan is also mentioned who you should contact (list of authorities, oil cleanup teams and port state control) and how to report this event to the nearest coast guard station.

A typical shipboard oil pollution plan contains:

- An action plan with instructions for the oil pollution prevention team. This is a list of duties the crewmembers have to fulfil in case of an oil spill.
- General information about the ship
- Procedures to contain the discharge of the oil into the sea in accordance to MARPOL regulations (regulation 37 of annex I)
- Drawings of fuel/oil lines
- Location of SOPEP boxes

The plan should be written in accordance to the International Maritime Organization regulations.

== Panama Canal Ship Oil Pollution Emergency Plan ==
The PCSOPEP (Panama Canal Ship Oil Pollution Emergency plan), which became effective 1 January 2005. Under these regulations, vessels present a plan for Canal waters and pay tariffs for the availability of personnel and equipment for oil spill response. In return, the ACP (Panama Canal Authority) acts as the sole Oil Spill Response Organization (OSRO) for vessels in transit or awaiting transit of the Panama Canal.

== Oil spill box ==
This box is equipped with anti- pollution equipment.

Consists of :

- 1 x 4 WB510SN, oilboom 3m x dia. 13m
- 1 x WSWL100F, oil sweep 48 cm x 30 cm
- 6 x WSO410, oil socks 120 cm x dia. 7.5 cm
- 2 x oil Truckpack KTO 100
- 200 x WP200S, oil pads 50 x 40 cm
- 50 x YPB200S, oil pads 50 x 40 cm
- 1 x PPE105, PVC protective gloves
- 2 x MTL103, disposal bags

Oil Spill box 7 barrel is equipped with anti- pollution equipment.

Consists of :

- 4 x WB510SN-03, oilboom 3m x dia. 14m
- 1 x WSWL100F, oil sweep 48 cm x 30 cm
- 6 x WSO120-20, oil socks 120 cm x dia. 7.5 cm
- 2 x TP40, oil Truckpack 40 litre
- 200 x WP200, oil pads 40 x 40 cm
- 50 x GBP100H, universal pads 50 x 40 cm
- 1 x PPE105, PVC protective gloves
- 2 x OCS6012-100, IMO disposable bags
- 1 x VB-0103, Safety goggle
- 1 x Non sparking hand pump
- 1 x 10 steps action plan
- 1 x screw driver
