= PSCO =

PSCO may refer to:

- Police Community Support Officer
- Port State Control Officer
- Public Service Company of Colorado (PSCo), a subsidiary of Xcel Energy
