= École nationale des travaux publics de l'État =

French engineering school

Coordinates: 45°46′44″N 4°55′22″E

École Nationale des Travaux Publics de l'État
- Motto: "L'Ecole des choix"
- Type: Établissement public à caractère scientifique, culturel et professionnel
- Established: 1954
- Budget: €20 M
- Head: Jean-Baptiste Lesort
- Students: 604
- Location: Vaulx-en-Velin (Paris until 1975), France
- Website: http://www.entpe.fr

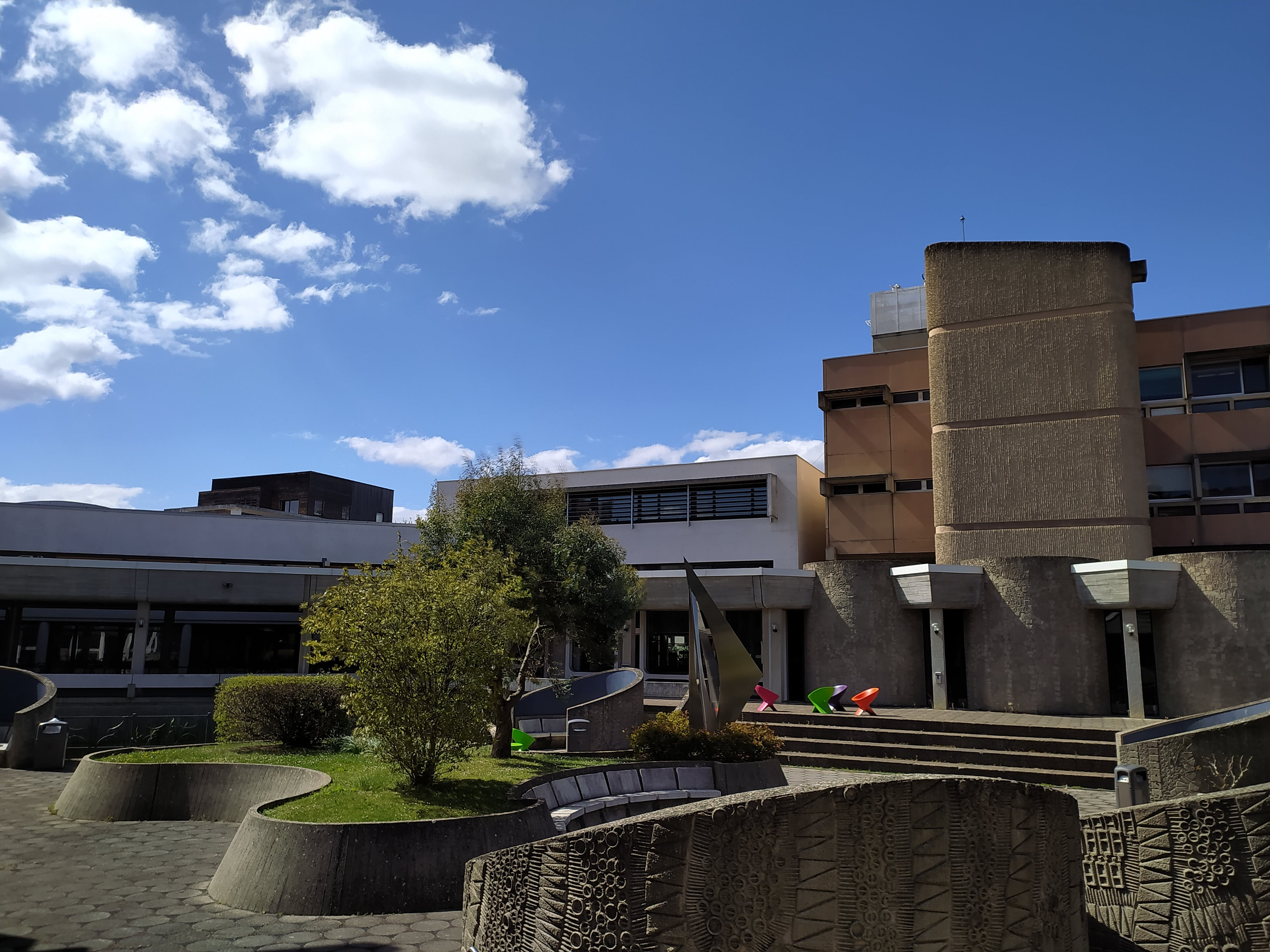
Campus of ENTPE

The École nationale des travaux publics de l'État or ENTPE (English: National School of Public Works of the State) is an engineering school part of the French Grandes Écoles founded in 1954 in Paris by the Ministry of Public Works and Transport and located since 1976 in Lyon Metropolitan Area (Vaulx-en-Velin). The main vocation of ENTPE is to train engineers who will serve as technical managers within the French civil service into the State Public Works Engineering Corps or "Ingénieurs des Travaux Publics de l'Etat (ITPE)", even though nowadays half of the students are intended for the private sector, in particular in large French companies in the construction or transport sectors (Eiffage, Bouygues, Vinci, Keolis ...).

== Admission ==
=== Recruitment ===
- External exams for three quarters of the students. Admission to the ENTPE is made through a nationwide very selective entrance examination, and requires a minimum of two years of preparation after high school in Scientific Preparatory Classes (a two-year highly selective undergraduate program in Mathematics, Physics, Chemistry and Engineering). The ENTPE recruits on average among the top 15% of the students in these preparatory classes. About 180 students per year are recruited in this way; half of them have the status of civil servants.
- Also exists an exam exclusively made for civil servants having served a minimum of four years, generally technicians wishing to evolve in their careers. Each year, 10 to 15 civil servants are selected by this way
- Recruitment after another degree, a direct admission in second year (Master I equivalent) is possible, for French students or students with citizenship from the European union. It is necessary to already withhold a Master I diploma cum laude in Civil Engineering, Mathematics, Mechanics or Physics. Only a dozen students are selected each year.
- Foreign students (outside EU) have access through the "classical" external way (they can't be French civil servant though) or can access with special conditions through agreements with foreign schools or by a commission deciding on academic files. Foreign students are generally Moroccans, Vietnamese, Chinese, Brazilian or Syrians.

=== Student Status ===
Students can be civil servants or not:

- The civil servants engineering students are paid starting on their first year of school but they sign an engagement to work for the French State for 8 years starting at the end of their scholarship. The netto salary of one of these is around from €1300 to €1500 for the students accepted through the external exam.
- The non-civil servants engineering students are simply called "civilians". They don't get paid during school and work mainly for the private sector once graduated.

== Curriculum ==
=== Initial Curriculum ===
The ENTPE trains engineers in 3 years in all the fields of civil engineering, town and country planning and sustainable development. The teaching is the same, regardless of the admission way.

The training goes the following way :

First Year	Second Year	Third Year
Common Courses : Continuum mechanics, mechanics of materials, ...; Geology, Hydrology...; Economics, Sociology ...; Foreign languages; Sport	Common Courses : Planning project for the benefit of local areas; Road and rail infrastructure, Geotechnical engineering, Statistics ...; Public law, Government procurement,...; Foreign languages; Sport	Common Courses : Management control system, Human Management, ...; Foreign languages; Sport
	Specialization courses among the 5 fields : Urban Planning; Civil Engineering; Transportation; Buildings; Environment and Risk Management	Specialization courses among the 6 fields : Urban Planning; Civil Engineering; Transportation; Buildings; Risk Management; Rivers, coasts and waterways
Internship of 4 weeks : construction worker; temporary worker in a state service in metropolitan France and overseas; Volunteer in a humanitarian mission abroad	Internship as an engineer assistant (5 months)	Masters thesis or internship as engineer for a duration of 6 months

The ENTPE also proposes a large panel of complementary courses, mainly enabling students to obtain a second degree. It is for instance possible for students to obtain degrees from the following schools:

- "Double" curriculum as engineer & architect with an architecture degree from the École nationale supérieure d'architecture de Lyon, common course with students from the INSA de Lyon and the école Centrale de Lyon
- "Double" curriculum as engineer & geologist with an engineering diploma in geology from the École nationale supérieure de géologie of Nancy
- "Double" curriculum as engineer & manager with a partnership with the Institut d'Administration des Entreprises of Lyon
- "Double" curriculum in the field of political sciences with the Institut d'études politiques de Lyon

=== Doctoral school ===
The ENTPE is also entitled to deliver PhDs inside one of the 6 laboratories it shelters. Up to 20 PhDs are delivered each year.

== Partnerships ==
=== French partnerships ===
The School is member of the following:

- Ministry of Ecology, Energy, Sustainable Development and Sea
- Conférence des grandes écoles
- PRES Université de Lyon: Pôle de recherche et d'enseignement supérieur

=== International partnerships ===
The School also enables students to attend classes and obtain degrees from foreign universities, through many partnerships:

- New York University – United States (Master of Science – 9 months)
- University College Cork – Ireland (Master of Engineering – Environment – 18 months)
- University of Westminster in London – UK (Master of Science – 12 months)
- University of Manchester Institute of Science and Technology (UMIST) in Manchester – UK (Master of Science – 12 months)
- Université de Sherbrooke – Canada (Maîtrise – 18 months)
- Université Laval de Québec – Canada (Maîtrise – 18 months)
- École Hassania des Travaux Publics (EHTP) – Royaume du Maroc
- Université autonome de Madrid – Espagne
- Institut universitaire d'architecture de Venise – Italy
- University of California Berkeley – United States (Master of Science and Mechanical Engineering)

== Research ==
Along with teaching, the ENTPE also deploys a strong activity in research. There are actually 6 different laboratories in the school, each one specialized in one of the fields of study evoked before. It has over 200 staff. 4 of its 6 laboratories are part of the CNRS.

== Openings ==
As its name goes, the School trains in the fields of civil engineering ("Travaux Publics"), but also those mentioned before: Building, City Planning, Environment, Transportation, and to sum it up, all the fields of engineering linked to sustainable development.

=== Non-civil servant students ("civilians") ===
After School, they are mainly hired by large civil engineering firms such as Egis, Eiffage, Vinci, Arcadis, Bouygues...

=== Civil servants ===
There are different possibilities:

- They can keep on obtaining a PhD either at one of the laboratories of the School, or one of the research labs of the Ministry.
- They can be selected by a jury to obtain another degree, through a "fourth year", which will either be another Master II equivalent, or a Mastère Spécialisé in an other French "Grandes Ecoles" (usually ENAC, ENPC, ENSAM ...) or abroad (Imperial College London, University of Nottingham, ...). This mainly concerns the technical areas where the employing ministry needs specific expertise as the civil aviation or the maritime safety.
- Those attending a double diploma as engineer & architect have to attend architecture school for another 2 years minimum
- Finally, most students take up directly their first position as technical management staff in the civil service. For instance as Real Estate project manager, Natural and technological risks specialist, Research Officer in the field of Transport ....
- Still, it is possible for civil servants to go work for a private company, but then they will have to break the contract they have signed with the State, and therefore will have to refund all the money involved by the State in their scholarship (pays and tuitions fees), which sums up to around €90000. These amounts are usually paid by the private company.

== Student life ==
=== Life on Campus ===
It was established in Vaulx-en-Velin on a common campus with the school of architecture of Lyon. Numerous sports infrastructures exist, among which can be mentioned a 25 meters and 4 meters deep swimming pool, a dojo, a fitness room, 4 tennis courts. There is naturally also a cafeteria, a students' bar (Grimbergen, 1664) with its patio, a music room.

Thanks to an agreement with the local HLM office, students are housed in cheap and comfortable apartments near the school.

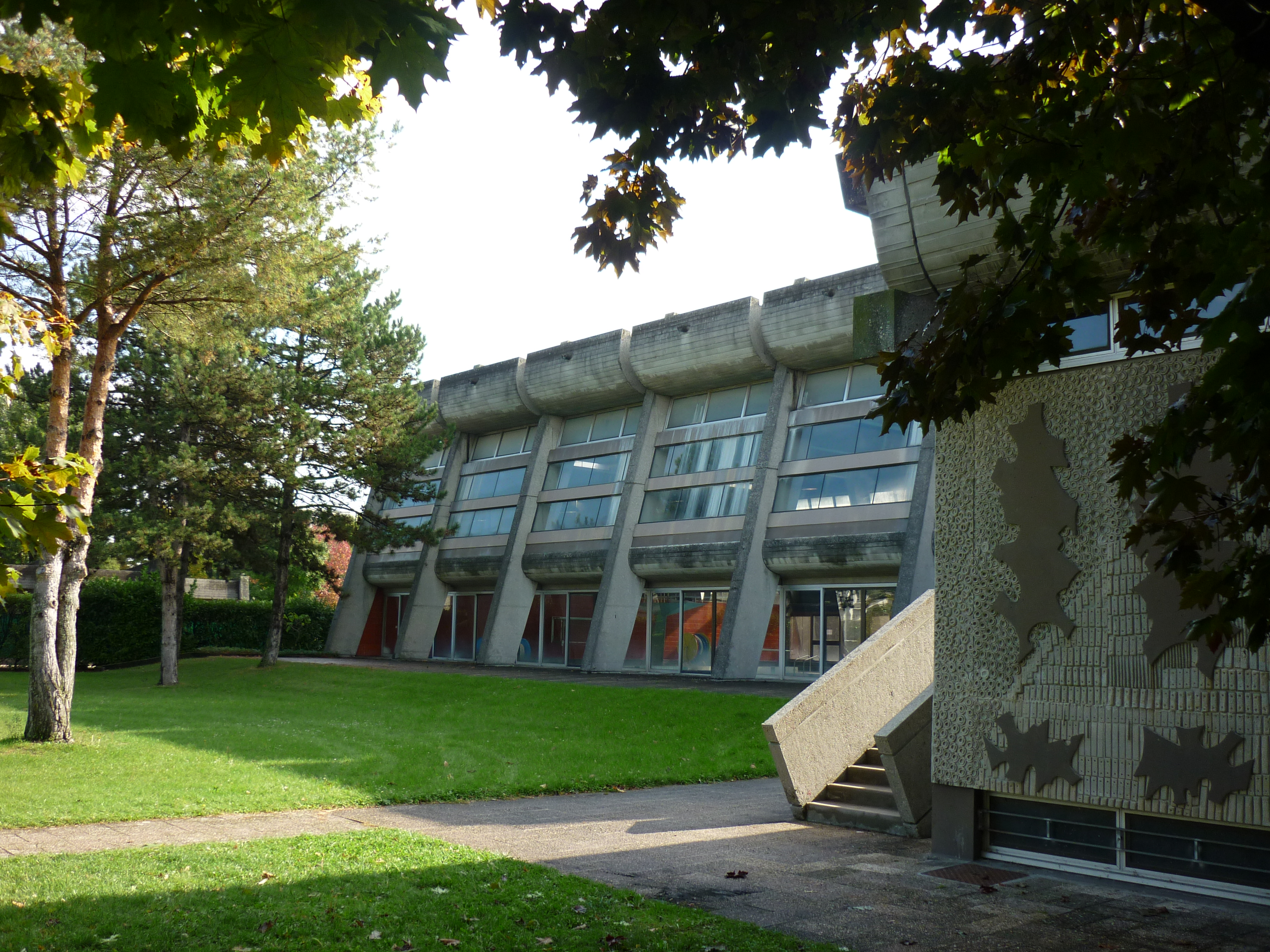
Swimming Pool in the campus of ENTPE

=== Community life ===
Like many other schools, the ENTPE focuses a lot on community life through different sport activities:

- indoor sports: volley, basketball, indoor-football, badminton, etc.
- outdoor sports : football, rugby, sailing, rowing, golf, etc.
- water sports : diving, water polo, etc.
- mountain sports : hiking, skiing, etc.
- dance, fitness.
- etc.

But also :

- Music
- Annual School Gala preparation
- The Rencontre Théatrales de Lyon (Reuteuleu), an international festival of student theater
- Oenology
- Cheese sampling
- Poker
- etc.

== Former Students ==
- Jean Mallot
- Emmanuel de Buretel
- Yannick Bestaven
- Patrick Jaillet

== See also ==
=== Other Civil Engineering Schools ===
- École spéciale des travaux publics
- École des ingénieurs de la ville de Paris
- Institut national des sciences appliquées de Lyon
- École nationale des ponts et chaussées
- Centre des études supérieures industrielles
