= National Association of Marine Surveyors =

The National Association of Marine Surveyors Inc. (NAMS) is a Houston, Texas–based not-for-profit professional association that advances and supports the marine surveying profession by certifying marine professionals with at least five years surveying experience. NAMS functions as an international certification organization in that their members are required to pass a discipline specific certification examination. Recertification is accomplished through annual and semi-annual meetings and workshops held in some of the world’s major seaports and maritime hubs. Finally, NAMS engage in educational efforts whose scope extends beyond their membership and into the industry at-large.

== History ==
NAMS was formed in 1962 as the culmination of a 14-year process that began when the Underwriters Laboratories Marine Dept (Yacht Safety Bureau, as it was known at the time), convened a body of independent expert surveyors to conduct equipment-review and consult with the YSB. The group remained in existence until YSB’s reorganization in 1960. During that time, a reputation for professionalism and competence accrued to them, and, in the year following the restructuring of the YSB, the group continued to convene. A formal committee for oversight was formed and nearly a year later, the National Association of Marine Surveyors was formally convened. Since then, it has garnered a reputation for industry acumen that has even resulted in its members being solicited as expert witnesses. In 1980, the NAMS-Certified Marine Surveyor (CMS) membership level was enacted, which denotes that a marine surveyor has been certified by the organization to practice in certain area of expertise. NAMS has expanded since that time to an international membership with members in Puerto Rico, the Caribbean Islands, Canada, Europe, South America, the Middle East, and Asia.

== Certification ==
NAMS certified surveyors are considered to be as highly qualified within their specific area as anyone else in the industry. They are qualified to serve as consultants, special project directors, and educators. The amount of knowledge and experience required to become a NAMS-CMS in part explains their slow numeric growth over the last 45 years. The certification process begins when a member has “served as [a] professional marine [surveyor] for not less than five years,” although provisions are made for those with less surveying experience when it is coupled with extensive industry experience in other capacities. Candidates for certification are then screened by NAMS governing bodies for professional ethics, technical work products, and reputation. Finally, they are examined for high competence in the portion or discipline of the industry they practice in. NAMS surveyors work in one or more of five disciplines: Yachts & Small Craft, Hull & Machinery, Cargo, Marine Warranty, and Fishing Vessels. Surveyors often specialize further within these three categories, subdividing into NAMS Codes of Service. Once certified, NAMS Surveyors are required to earn 24 continuing education credit hours every two years. Once certified, NAMS members are not to practice in disciplines in which they are not certified in.

== Continuing Education ==
One of NAMS’ goals is the continuing education of marine surveyors worldwide, and, once a surveyor has obtained the CMS designation, they are required to receive 24 hours of continuing education and ethics training per two-year period in order to maintain their membership. NAMS holds national and regional education conferences in the United States and internationally to update its members’ scope and depth of professional knowledge and ethics but also to commend that knowledge to the industry as a whole. One of NAMS’ long-term goals is the enhancement of the industry through coordinated “free exchange of information” with all interested parties. As it is not a trade organization (i.e. not formed for the particular advancement of its own members) but rather an agent for improvement throughout the industry, it is not hindered by any consideration in its dissemination of an updated knowledge base; it is for this reason that the expertise of NAMS members is so highly regarded. Its educational focus has made it a welcomed part of the entire industry.

== Ethics ==
Marine surveyors, as independent third-party standard-setters and evaluators of marine safety, serviceability, and asset valuation of marine vessels and cargo. Marine surveyors hold the trust of government, maritime industry, and their clients. As a result, the industry places strict ethical standards on surveyors. NAMS’ own ethical code is even more stringent. NAMS’ ethical stance can basically be understood as bifocal: firstly, they aim to ensure that no NAMS surveyor practices outside of his/her discipline, and secondly, that within their specialty, no consideration prompts them to take a position against their professional judgment, as is stated in their credo: “No surveyor shall take any position contrary to his or her own knowledge or opinion for any direct or indirect monetary gain or its equivalent.” In both ways, ethical standards are intended to ensure reliability and objectivity on the part of surveyors, from whom utmost professionalism is demanded in all “dealings with clients, associates, and fellow members.” The Code of Ethics outlines general best-practice principles for surveyors, professional conduct standards, and protocol for investigation in the event of an accusation. In this way, it is hoped, ethical business can become the norm for all surveyors in accordance with the goal stated within the code: “the enhancement of the marine industry and the marine surveying profession.”

== Current Oversight ==
The national officers are President, Vice President, National Secretary, Treasurer, and Immediate Past President (see NAMS website for current officeholders). A staff of regional vice presidents assists executive leadership. Numerous chaired committees monitor and oversee special purposes within the association (e.g. Qualification and Certification, Technical, Ethics, Education, Conference, and Finance). Regional vice presidents represent major marine regions and many of the most important port cities in the world.
