= French Corps of Maritime Affairs Administrators =

The French Corps of Maritime Affairs Administrators (Le corps des administrateurs des affaires maritimes) is a corps of career officers of the French Navy. Members of the Corps contribute within national, international and European Union bodies to the design, development and implementation of French maritime public policies.

== Status ==
The corps of maritime affairs administrators constitutes a corps of career officers of the French Navy. This Corps is administered by the ministry responsible for the sea. Its role is to ensure the direction of the services of the territorial administration of the State in charge of the sea and the coast, the organizations which depend on them and the maritime higher education establishments. They are also intended to provide teaching and research in these establishments.

== Mission ==
The Corps participate, within national, international and European Union bodies, in the design, development and implementation of maritime public policies and in particular:

- The safety and security of maritime activities, within the framework of State action at sea.
- The sustainable development of resources, communications and maritime and coastal spaces.
- Research, teaching, training, social protection and promotion in the professional sectors concerned.
- The general organization of defense and maritime defense transport.

The members of the Corps are, in their territorial jurisdictions, the representatives of the maritime prefects, within the limits of the delegations of powers granted to them for this purpose by government decree. They represent the French Navy there and ensure the exercise of its services under the conditions set by the Minister in charge of the Sea and the Minister of the Armed Forces.

== Recruitment ==
The Corps is recruited from the universities and the Grande écoles, from maritime professionals, from the civil service and from the military.

Three different routes of recruitment exists as of 2023:

1. A competition based on tests open to candidates holding one of the diplomas required of candidates for the external competition of the École nationale d'administration and aged twenty-six at most on 1 January 2023, aimed at recruiting student administrators (midshipmen).

2. An internal and external competition intended to recruit candidates to be commissioned as Administrateur de 1re classe (Lieutenant). This competition is open to:

(a) Officers of Lieutenant's rank or officers of corresponding rank, with at most eight years in grade, and not on the promotion list for Lieutenant Commanders, and to Lieutenants junior grade or officers of corresponding rank, aged forty years at most and having at least five years of military service.

(b) Civil servants category A and non-tenured civil servants of an equivalent level of State, local and public establishments, aged forty years at most and having five years of public service.

(c) Officers of the Merchant Navy, holders of a maritime diploma of higher studies, aged forty at most, and having at least thirty months of service at sea.

3. An internal and external competition intended to recruit candidates to be commissioned as Administrateur principal (Lieutenant Commander). This competition is open to:

(a) Officers of the Merchant Navy, aged forty-five at the most, holders of a maritime diploma of higher studies and a valid licence giving at least the prerogatives of captain without limitation of tonnage, or of chief engineer without power limitation, and with at least eighteen months of service at sea in a managerial capacity.

(b) Officers of the Merchant Navy, aged forty-five at the most, holders of the Merchant Navy 1st Class Cadet Officer diploma and a valid licence giving at least the prerogatives of captain without limitation of tonnage, or chief engineer without power limitation, and with at least thirty months of service at sea in a managerial capacity.

(c) Naval officers of the rank of Lieutenants on the promotion list for Lieutenant Commanders or of the rank of Lieutenant Commander not on the promotion list for Commanders, having accomplished at least four years of service at sea and holding an appropriate diploma.

== Training ==
Midshipmen recruited through Route 1 (above) are going through a two-year training period. The first year is spent at the École nationale de la sécurité et de l'administration de la mer (ENSAM), at the French Naval Academy for initial officer training and the officer in charge of the watch course, and during internships in the services of state territorial administration and on shipboard. The second year provides training related to one of the three professional specialities of the future administrators: general administration and operational functions, risk prevention, safety and security of ships, and maritime higher education. The second year is spent at ENSAM and during interships and on shipboard. For the first two specialities it includes an onboard course carried out within the framework of the school of application for naval officers, and for the specialty maritime higher education an internship at the École nationale supérieure maritime.

Officer Candidates recruited through Route 2 (above) take part in a one-year training period, adjusted according to the Candidates previous career as civil servant, military officer or officer in the merchant navy.

Officer Candidates recruited through Route 3 (above) for the specialty maritime higher education follows a one-year training period alternating educational contributions and internships in administrative services and teaching.

== Ranks and rank insignia ==
Ranks in the general naval hierarchy	Ranks in the Corps of Maritime Affairs Administrators	Rank insignia
Vice-amiral	Administrateur général de 1re classe	
Contre-amiral	Administrateur général de 2e classe	
Capitaine de vaisseau	Administrateur en chef de 1re classe	
Capitaine de frégate	Administrateur en chef de 2e classe	
Capitaine de corvette	Administrateur principal	
Lieutenant de vaisseau	Administrateur de 1re classe	
Enseigne de vaisseau de 1re classe	Administrateur de 2e classe	
Enseigne de vaisseau de 2e classe	Administrateur de 3e classe	
