= Hervé Berville =

French politician (born 1990)

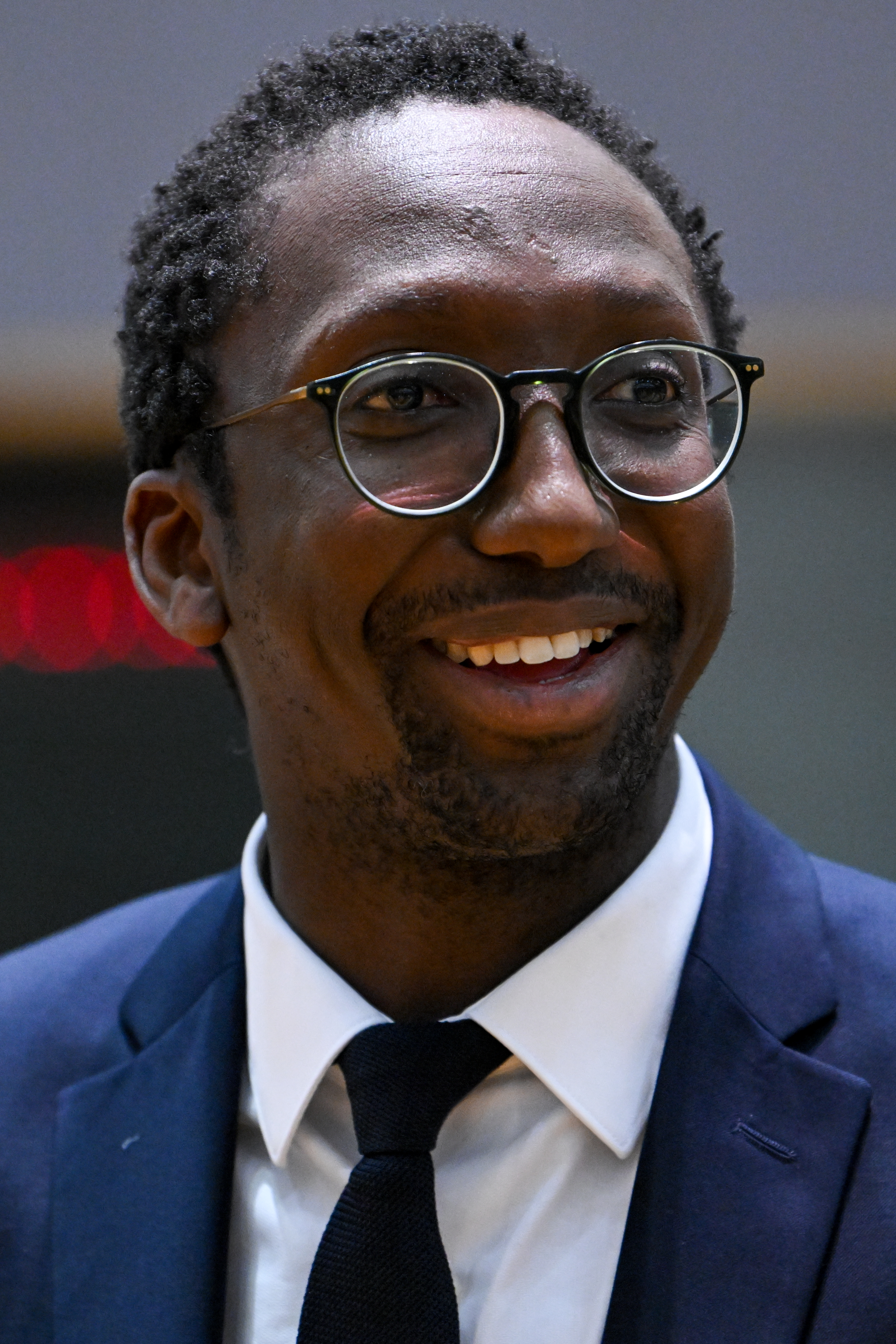

Secretary of State for the Sea and Biodiversity
- In office 8 February 2024 – 21 September 2024
- Prime Minister: Gabriel Attal
- Preceded by: Himself (Sea); Sarah El Haïry (Biodiversity)
- Succeeded by: Fabrice Loher
- In office 4 July 2022 – 11 January 2024
- Prime Minister: Élisabeth Borne
- Preceded by: Justine Benin
- Succeeded by: Himself

Member of the National Assembly for Côtes-d'Armor's 2nd constituency
- Incumbent
- Assumed office 8 July 2024
- Preceded by: Chantal Bouloux
- In office 21 June 2017 – 5 August 2022
- Preceded by: Viviane Le Dissez
- Succeeded by: Chantal Bouloux

Personal details
- Born: 15 January 1990 (age 36) Madanzh-Buhimga, Rwanda
- Party: Renaissance
- Education: Sciences Po Lille; London School of Economics

Hervé Berville (French pronunciation: [ɛʁve bɛʁvil]; born 15 January 1990) is a French economist and politician of Renaissance (RE) who has served as a member of the National Assembly from 2017 to 2022 and again since 2024, representing the department of Côtes-d'Armor.

From 2022 to 2024, Berville served as Secretary of State for the Sea and Biodiversity in the governments of successive Prime Ministers Élisabeth Borne and Gabriel Attal.

== Early life and education ==
A survivor of the genocide against the Tutsi in Rwanda, Berville was adopted by a French couple in Brittany, graduated from the London School of Economics and worked for Stanford University. During his studies, he conducted research in Kenya in 2016. Berville is active in the French intellectual circles.

== Political career ==
In the French National Assembly, Berville was a member of the Committee on Foreign Affairs. In addition to his committee assignments, he served as vice chairman of the French Parliamentary Friendship Group for relations with Burundi and Rwanda.

In April 2020, Berville was dispatched by President Emmanuel Macron to Kigali to officially represent the French government at the commemorations on the occasion of the 26th anniversary of the Genocide against the Tutsi of Rwanda.

== Political positions ==
In July 2019, Berville voted in favor of the French ratification of the European Union’s Comprehensive Economic and Trade Agreement (CETA) with Canada.

== Other activities ==
- Bill & Melinda Gates Foundation, Member of the Advisory Group of the Goalkeepers Initiative (since 2022)
- French Development Agency (AFD), Member of the Supervisory Board (since 2018)

== See also ==
- 2017 French legislative election
