= Jean Gaubert =

French politician (born 1947)

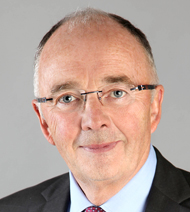
Jean Gaubert

Jean Gaubert (born 3 March 1947) was a member of the National Assembly of France. He represented Côtes-d'Armor's 2nd constituency for three periods, 1985-1986, then 1992-1993 and then 1997-2012, as a member of the Socialiste, radical, citoyen et divers gauche.
