= Hassania School of Public Works =

School in Casablanca, Morocco

École Hassania des Travaux Publics
- Type: Moroccan Grande Ecole; Member of Conférence des Grandes Écoles
- Established: 1971
- Budget: 11 376 000 DH (2012)
- Chairman: Najib El Karkouri
- Students: 850
- Location: Casablanca, Morocco; 33°32′53″N 7°39′05″W
- Website: www.ehtp.ac.ma
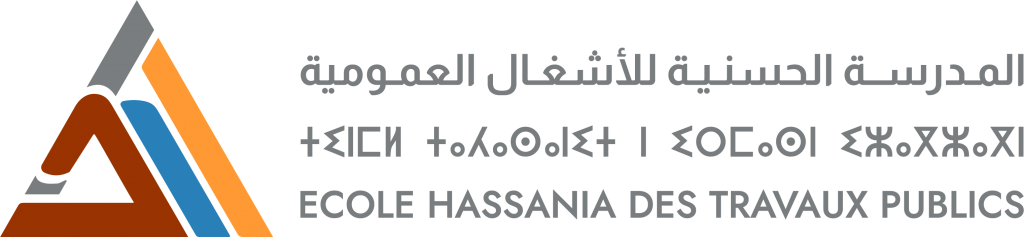

The Hassania School of Public Works (Arabic: المدرسة الحسنية للأشغال العمومية, romanized: Al-Madrasah al-Ḥasanīyah lil-Ashghāl al-ʻUmūmīyah, French: École Hassania des Travaux Publics, EHTP), is one of Morocco's oldest engineering schools, a member of the Conférence des grandes écoles, and remains to this day one of the most prestigious Moroccan Grande Ecole in engineering. It is located in Casablanca few miles from the Casablanca Technopark.

It was established in 1971 by the Public Ministry of Public Works to provide the Moroccan Kingdom with engineers of high potential in the sectors of civil engineering, electrical engineering and regional planning.

In 1993, the status of EHTP was set up as publicly owned engineering establishment under the supervision of the Moroccan Ministry Of Equipment and Transport.

The school offers an initial training of Specialized master's degree in "Gestion et exploitation des systèmes de transport" (Management and Exploitation of Transportation Systems). Created in 2004 in partnership with the École des Ponts ParisTech, the École nationale des travaux publics de l'État and the Polytechnic University of Catalonia, It was accredited by the Ministry of Education in 2008.

In terms of scientific research, the EHTP has a number of laboratories and research centers endowed with all the necessary equipment for scientific and technical studies.

== Academics ==
With core competences in civil engineering and regional planning EHTP offers programmes in a range of fields, from Computer Science - Software engineering, Electrical engineering to Meteorology engineering and Geographical Information Systems engineering.

In addition to its technical education, the EHTP founded in 2001 a cultural modulus entitled "Personal Initiation Project" (PIP). It offers an occasion for young students to carry out a cultural and associative project in the course of their studies.

Besides Academic training, the Hassania School of Public Works is the leader in terms of in-service training. The school offers a multidisciplinary MBA training in International Management in partnership with ENPC in France.

Three major types of programmes are on offer :

- Engineering programmes: leading to a 5-year postgraduate engineering degree (accessible, after competitive examinations, by both undergraduate-graduate curriculum and the 2-year master course) or to masters of science
- Professional programmes for postgraduates: Mastères spécialisés (M.S.), MBA (Master of Business Administration).

== Engineering fields ==
- Civil engineering
- Computer science, Software engineering
- Electrical engineering
- Meteorology
- Geographical Information Systems
- Hydraulic, urban and environmental engineering
- Logistics and transport engineering

== Master ==
Specialized master's degree MAGEST : « Master Gestion et exploitation des systèmes de transport » (Master in Management and Exploitation of Transportation Systems) was created in 2004 under the TEMPUS - MEDA programme. The master's degree was developed in partnership with 3 other schools : the École des Ponts ParisTech, the École nationale des travaux publics de l'État in France and the Polytechnic University of Catalonia in Spain. It's an initiation training of 3 semesters (1 year and a half) after 4 years of obtaining the Baccalauréat, with a goal of providing necessary tools and training in the management of the transportation system in Morocco, a sector that shows dynamic development in the country.

Since 2008, the training was accredited by the Ministry of Education in Morocco.
