= Caribbean MOU =

Regional organization

The Caribbean Memorandum of Understanding on Port State Control (Caribbean MoU) is an international regional organization whose purpose is to organize and harmonize Port State Control inspections on ships calling at ports of its member states. The possibility of inspecting ships flying a foreign flag was formalized by the Montego Bay Convention of 1982, then various texts from the IMO (International Maritime Organization) made it possible to specify the extent of the fields of competence of authorized inspectors. This is for them to check the compliance of the ship vis-à-vis international regulations on both technical plans (SOLAS), related to the prevention of pollution (MARPOL), safety management (ISM ), security (ISPS) and living conditions on board (MLC). In order to promote regional cooperation for the sharing of the task of ships to be inspected as well as the exchange of information, the IMO has encouraged the creation of regional agreements for Port State Control, like the two main ones, Paris Mou (Europe and East-Canada zone) and Tokyo Mou (Asia-Pacific zone). The Caribbean Memorandum was born on February 9, 1996, in Barbados and currently has twenty Member States with the ambition of eliminating the operation of sub-standard ships through a harmonized port State control system.

== See also ==
- International Association of Ports and Harbors
