= State Public Works Engineering Corps (France) =

French public works agency

The State Public Works Engineering Corps (French: Ingénieurs des Travaux Publics de l'Etat (ITPE)) is a corps of civil servants (fonctionnaires) with a degree from the National School of State Public Works of the State (ENTPE), working for the Government of France. Its members are mainly employed as team or project managers in the French Civil Service, overseeing areas such as infrastructure, environment, transportation, and energy.

== Structure ==
Public works engineers are civil servants who form the main technical supervisory body of the ministries responsible for the environment, housing, territories, transport, and the maritime sector. ITPEs, belonging to an interministerial body, may also work in most other French civil service ministries (Ministries of Justice, Foreign Affairs, National Education, Interior, Defense, Culture, Prime Minister's Office, etc.) and be assigned throughout France, including the French overseas territories and territories, as well as to certain positions within French embassies abroad.

The ITPE corps comprises three grades:

- Ingénieur des TPE
- Ingénieur divisionnaire des TPE, which provides access to senior management positions. This grade is accessible after six years of service and is subject to selection based on the engineer's background;
- Ingénieur des TPE hors classe, which allows for positions corresponding to a particularly high level of responsibility.

During their studies at ENTPE, civil servant students (not yet tenured) are classified as:

- Élève ingénieur des TPE during their first and second year of study.
- Ingénieur des TPE stagiaire from their third year of study.

== Missions ==
The members of the corps are in charge of the supervision and management of public policies requiring technical and scientific skills; their work is not restricted to traditional public works areas, but include areas as :

- Civil engineering
- Real estate management
- Security of the national road network
- Sustainable development
- Transportation
- Management of natural and technological risks
- Urban planning
- Biodiversity
- Hydrology and Hydrometry
- Air quality
- Geology and Mining
- Energy
- Civil Aviation within the DGAC
- Rail safety
- Maritime Safety and Security within French Ships Safety Centers
- Port Facility
- Maintenance and Safety of inland waterways
- IT and big data
- Economic development
- Education and Research
- ...

Engineers carry out their assignments and responsibilities throughout France, including French overseas territories. They could also be stationed in French embassies abroad, as well as in international and European Union organizations, such as the World Bank and European Commission.

== Formation ==
The majority of the engineers are recruited directly during their 2-years post secondary studies in classes préparatoires by taking a competitive examination in mathematics, physics, and engineering. If accepted they join the National School of Public Works (French: École nationale des travaux publics de l'État) as a paid civil servant in training for 3 years.

During their studies in this engineering school (grandes écoles d'ingénieurs), they receive a multidisciplinary education in the fields of competences in which they will be brought to work once graduated. They also carry out a professional internship per year of study, in France or abroad. After graduation, they can go directly to an assigned position in the civil service. It is also possible for them to be selected to do a thesis in a field of interest of the Government or to carry out an additional year of specialization study to occupy certain positions requiring specific technical skills.

== See also ==
- French Civil Service
- Ministry for the Ecological Transition (France)
- Corps of Bridges, Waters and Forests
