= École nationale supérieure maritime =

École nationale supérieure maritime (French pronunciation: [ekɔl nɑsjɔnal sypeʁjœʁ maʁitim]; abbr. ENSM) is the French National Maritime Academy, which trains merchant navy officers. It issues engineering degrees to Navigation Engineers who obtain the Merchant Navy Graduate Diploma (DESMM) and to students who follow courses in maritime engineering, majoring in ship eco-management (EGN) and deployment and maintenance of offshore systems (DMO).

== Organization ==
ENSM campus at Le Havre.

Heir to the schools of hydrography created by Charles IX in 1571 and the national schools of the merchant navy, the ENSM is a public school which was established in 2010. It is placed under the supervision of the Secretary of State in charge of the Sea. ENSM is certified by Lloyd's Register for its quality management system.

== Programs ==
=== Navigating engineer ===
The ENSM navigating engineer program is a scientific and technical education consisting of theoretical courses, professional situations on real and simulated installations and on-board internships. The program takes five and a half years after the baccalauréat, and qualifies the graduate as navigating engineers, for licensing as dual-purpose officers of the first class of the Merchant Navy (master mariner and chief engineer). The graduate receives the diplôme d’études supérieures de la marine marchande (DESMM) and the title of Engineer recognized by CTI (the French Commission for engineering).

=== Maritime engineering ===
The program in "Maritime Engineering Specialty, Vessel Eco-management" (EGN) and "Specialization in Maritime Engineering, Deployment and maintenance of offshore systems" (DMO) are two years master's programs in engineering accessible after the first three years of the DESMM program. It is also accessible by holders of a level II or higher merchant navy certificate: chief engineer 8000 kW, chief engineer, captain, officer in charge of the watch of a seagoing ship, and to holders of the DESMM or of a bachelor's degree in a scientific or a technical field. The program is also open to graduates of a Classe préparatoire aux grandes écoles in the physics and technology sector, to graduates of a Classe préparatoire adaptation technicien supérieur, to holders of a two-year technical college degree, and to technical university students after two years of study, after having passed a one-year maritime course at ENSM.

Master students have a minimum 4-week internship at technician level to be carried out outside the school period before entering the second year of Master studies, and a 24-week (6-month) end-of-study internship at engineer level integrated into their training course (this internship takes place during their last school year from January to June).

=== Engineers ===
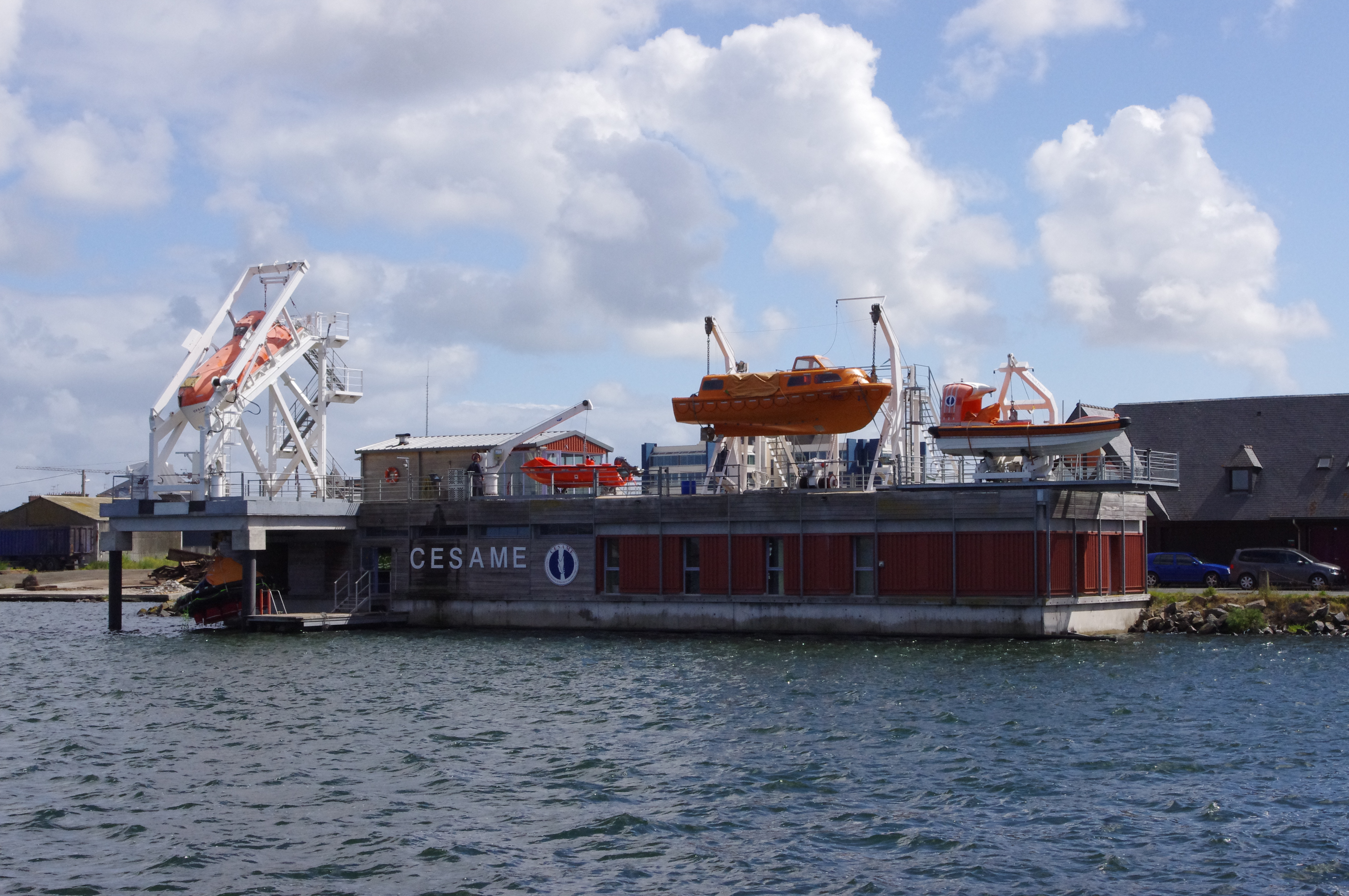
Training Center for Survival and Rescue at Sea, linked to the ENSM Saint-Malo campus.

A three-year program trains watch keeping engineers for the Merchant Navy, responsible for operating and repairing main and auxiliary machinery as well as various service installations. After six months at sea as a cadet and then as an engineer, obtaining the chief engineer's certificate associated with this training makes it possible become chief engineer on ships with a power of less than 8000 kW. The program is open to persons with a baccalauréat, to holders of a BTS in "maintenance of electro-marine systems", and to holders of other two-year degrees.

=== Deck officers ===
A three-year program trains international watch keeping officers for the Merchant Navy. After 12 months at sea, the OCQPI can complete their ENSM training to access the unlimited Master's certificate. The program is open to persons with a baccalauréat and to holders of two-year degrees.

=== Cyber security ===
The master program in "Cyber security of maritime and port systems" is a program sponsored by four schools: The IMT Atlantique, the ENSTA Bretagne, the Naval Academy and the ENSM. It is open for holders of a master's degree, or a bachelor's degree with at least three years professional experience.

=== Continuing education ===
In addition to the above programs, ENSM has a large number of professional programs for holders of maritime degrees and certificates. Among them are: Captain, 3000 ton; Chief Engineer 3000KW; Chief Engineer 8000KW; Unlimited Chief Engineer; Electro-Technical Engineer; Unlimited Master; Chief Deck Officer.
