= IMT Atlantique =

Technological university in France

IMT Atlantique Bretagne-Pays de la Loire
- IMT Atlantique Bretagne-Pays de la Loire
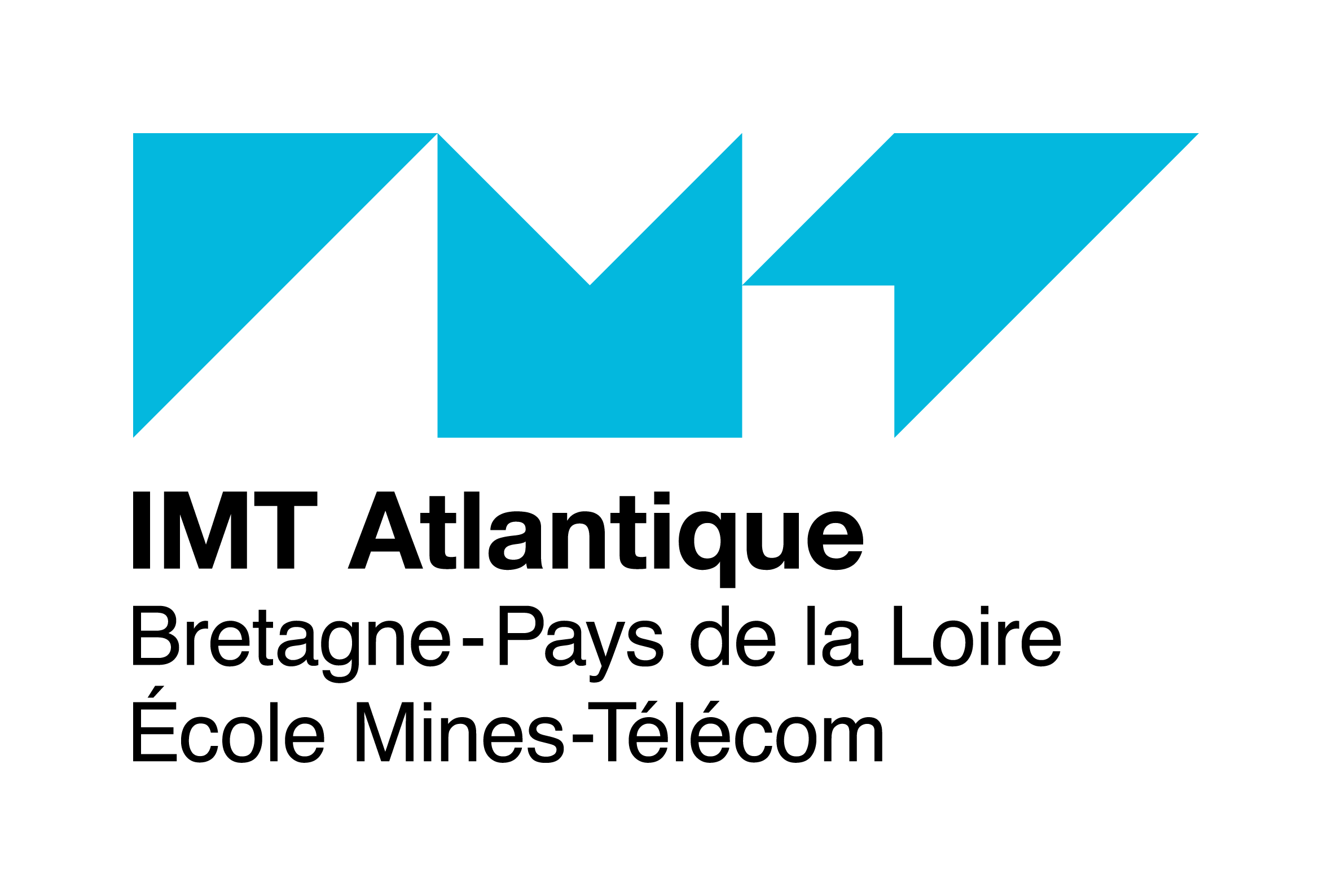
- IMT Atlantique
- Type: Grande école d'ingénieurs (public research university Engineering school)
- Established: January 1, 2017
- Parent institution: Institut Mines-Télécom
- Academic affiliations: Conférence des Grandes écoles Université Bretagne Loire
- Budget: 70 million euros
- Chairman: Guillaume Texier
- Director: Christophe Lerouge
- Academic staff: 260 with 115 HDR
- Students: 1800
- Location: Brest, Nantes, Rennes, France
- Campus: Brest, Nantes and Rennes
- Colors: Dark blue, light blue
- Website: www.imt-atlantique.fr/en

IMT Atlantique (also known as École Nationale Supérieure Mines-Télécom Atlantique) is one of the leading French engineering Grandes Écoles and a technological university, created on January 1, 2017 through the merger of Télécom Bretagne and its smaller sibling École nationale supérieure des mines de Nantes. It consists of three campuses in Brest, Nantes, Rennes. IMT Atlantique is part of the Institut Mines-Télécom and is a member of the Université Bretagne Loire.

IMT Atlantique offers a generalist Engineering curriculum with concentrations in the key fields of Applied Mathematics, Telecommunications and Energy. Students from Grandes Écoles preparatory classes may apply through the competitive Concours Commun Mines-Ponts entry exam.

Despite its small size (less than 2000 students), the school maintains consistently a high ranking both nationally and globally.

== History ==
=== École Nationale Supérieure des Télécommunications de Bretagne ===
The École Nationale Supérieure des Télécommunications de Bretagne (Télécom Bretagne), was a premier engineering school established in 1977 by Pierre Lelong, the Secretary of State for PTT. It is best known for the invention of the turbo code and the iterative decoding concept. In 1991, researcher Claude Berrou filled his first patent for the Turbo Codes, which are now essential for mobile and satellite communications. For his breakthrough, Claude Berrou was awarded the prestigious Marconi prize in 2005 and was elected as a member of the French Academy of Sciences in 2008.

=== École Nationale Supérieure des Techniques Industrielles et des Mines de Nantes ===
The École Nationale Supérieure des Techniques Industrielles et des Mines de Nantes (Mines Nantes) was established in 1991, significantly later than Télécom Bretagne, making it one of the youngest Grandes Ecoles in the Mines-Telecom group, with a special focus on energy and environment. In 2009 it came under the administrative supervision of the General Council for the Economy, Industry, Energy and Technologies. Mines Nantes was a major hub for nuclear engineering and research. It hosted the SUBATECH laboratory, a joint research unit with CNRS and the University of Nantes, which celebrated recently over 20 years of operation.

In 2012 the Institut Mines-Télécom was created, marking a significant restructuring of France's leading engineering schools. By 2014, the merge of Mines Nantes and Télécom Bretagne was formally envisaged. In 2015, both institutions reached a definitive agreement, paving the way for the creation of a single entity in January 2017. The merge provides the new institution with the critical mass and research power to compete with other engineering schools, both nationally and globally.

On February 2, 2017, IMT Atlantique formalised a strategic partnership with ENSTA Bretagne in the presence of the French Minister of Defence, Jean-Yves Le Drian. This agreement established a major regional engineering and cross-sectional hub, aiming at advancing research and innovation in high-stake fields, particularly within the defence, maritime engineering and cybersecurity sectors.

=== The Prestige Gap (Pre-2017) ===
The hierarchy of French engineering schools (Grandes Écoles) is rigidly defined by the selective nationwide entrance exams (concours).

=== Télécom Bretagne ===
It belonged to the Concours Mines-Ponts. Historically, it sat solidly as a Group A / Tier 1 school.

=== Mines de Nantes ===
Established much later in 1991, it initially recruited from the less-selective Concours Commun des Mines d'Albi, Alès, Douai, Nantes. It was widely considered a Group B / Tier 2 school. It lacked the historic deep-rooted networks in the elite French Corps d'État (state technical administrative bodies) that older schools enjoyed. When the merger was announced, Télécom Bretagne students and alumni openly revolted because they felt their degree’s market value was being artificially deflated to elevate a less prestigious, younger regional academy.

=== How the post-merger played out ===
To prevent prestige dilution, the administration had to align the selective admission requirements. They integrated the entire newly formed school, IMT Atlantique, into the highly competitive Concours Mines-Ponts. For the Nantes campus, this meant a massive leap in selective criteria. For the Brest/Rennes campuses, it meant a slight downward adjustment in average rank entry points for a few transition years, satisfying neither side initially.

Moreover, in the French system, "generalist" engineering degrees (like those from École Centrale or Mines Paris) carry more cultural prestige than specialized ones. The merger forced Télécom Bretagne to abandon its specialized pure-telecom identity to become a generalist tech school, leading eventually to a massive surge in global international rankings.

== Admission ==
Most of the Engineering students admitted to the school are selected via the competitive Concours Mines-Ponts from French preparatory classes, following a two to three-year highly intensive post-secondary curriculum focusing on Mathematics, Physics and Engineering sciences. IMT Atlantique offers 90 seats for each of the MP (Mathematics/Physics), PC (Physics and Chemistry) and PSI (Physics and Engineering Science) streams, maintaining a rigorous acceptance rate of 2%. Additionally, the school recruits top achieving students through its network of international partners.

In addition to the traditional Engineering program, IMT Atlantique offers a diverse range of academic and professional programs:

=== Apprentice engineer (FISA) ===
Apprentice engineer training programs in partnership with the regional authorities of Brittany and the Pays de la Loire region:

- Digital transformation of industrial systems,
- Software engineering,
- Computer science, networks and telecommunications

=== Masters ===
- Master of Science (MSc)
  - Information Technology
    - Track Communication system and network engineering
    - Track Data Science
    - Track Architecture and engineering for the internet of things
  - Management of production, logistics and procurement
    - Track Management and optimization of supply chains and transport
  - Process and bioprocess engineering
    - Track Project management for environmental and energy engineering
  - Nuclear Engineering
    - Track Advanced Nuclear Waste Management
    - Track Nuclear Energy Production and Industrial Applications
    - Track Medical applications
- Erasmus Mundus Joint Master Degree
  - Management and Engineering of Environment and Energy
  - Safe and Reliable Nuclear Applications
- Masters
  - Innovation management
  - Electronic, electrical energy and automation
  - Complex systems engineering
  - Fundamental physics
  - Information technology
  - Actuariat
  - Process and bioprocess engineering
  - Computer science

=== Post-masters degrees ===
- Cybersecurity
- Cybersecurity of maritime and port systems
- Cloud infrastructure and Devops
- IT applied to banking and actuarial decision-making
- Renewable Marine Energies

=== Doctoral programme ===
IMT Atlantique covers 30 doctoral specialities within the five doctoral schools in the Brittany and Pays de la Loire regions with which it is co-accredited.

== Academic ranking ==
At the national level, IMT Atlantique is consistently ranked within the prestigious A+ group of L'Etudiant's ranking list, securing its place among France's top 10 engineering schools. The school has demonstrated a strong upward trajectory in the past years, rising to the 4th place in 2024 and further placing in the 3th place in 2025 and 2026.

On the global stage, IMT Atlantique maintains a prominent standing, consistently appearing in Times Higher Education (THE).As of 2026, the institution is specifically recognised for its subject-level excellence:

- Engineering: ranked in the 251-300 band worldwide and 6th in France
- Computer Science: ranked in the 301-400 band globally and 7th in France.
- Interdisciplinary Science: achieved a prestigious 1st rank in France and a 124th place worldwide

The school's international visibility is further validated by its integration of the top 6% of the CWUR World University Rankingand the top 5% of the Webometrics ranking, which evaluates an institution's influence base on its Web presence (online content, scientific publications and citations, etc.).

Furthermore, IMT Atlantique remains a high performer in U-Multirank, a multi-dimensional ranking tool supported by the EU, which evaluates academic institutions based on their performance in teaching and learning, research, international orientation, knowledge transfer and regional engagement. In 2017, this ranking included 1497 institutions in 99 nations. IMT Atlantique has historically held a prominent place in France, reflecting its strength in bridging academic research and industrial applications.

International University Rankings
QS – Computer Science and Information Systems	98
QS – Electrical and Electronic Engineering	151-200
THE – Engineering	126-150
ARWU – Physics	401-500
ARWU – Management	201-300
Webometrics	1266/27000
French engineering school rankings
L'Étudiant	4
Usine Nouvelle	10
Le Figaro	10

== Research ==
=== Research departments ===
Research is organized into thirteen departments of teaching and research

- Automation, Computer-Integrated Manufacturing and IT (Nantes)
- Information Technology (Brest)
- Image and Data Processing (Brest)
- Languages and International Culture (Brest)
- The Logic of Practices, Social and Information Sciences (Brest)
- Mathematical and Electrical Engineering (Brest)
- Microwaves (Brest; Toulouse)
- Optics (Brest)
- Subatomic Physics and Related Technologies (Nantes)
- Social Science and Management (Nantes)
- Energy and Environmental Systems (Nantes)
- Network Systems, Cyber Security and Digital Law (Rennes)

=== National research and development ecosystem ===
The school is also linked to different joint research units:

- GEPEA - Process Engineering for Environment and Food (with the CNRS (French National Center for Scientific Research), ONIRIS (National College of Veterinary Medicine, Food Science and Engineering) and the University of Nantes.
- IRISA - Research Institute of Computer Science and Random Systems (with the CNRS, École Normale Supérieure de Rennes, the INRIA (French Institute for Research in Computer Science and Automation), the INSA of Rennes (French National Institute of Applied Sciences), the University of South Brittany, the University of Rennes-I and the École Supérieure d'Electricité (CentraleSupélec).
- Lab-STICC - (Research laboratory in the field of information and communication science and technology) with the CNRS, the University of West Brittany and the University of South Brittany, the ENSTA (graduate and post-graduate engineering school and research institute) of Brittany and the ENIB (graduate school of engineering) of Brest.
- LaTIM - Laboratory of Medical Information Processing, with the INSERM (French National Institute of Health and Medical Research) and the University of West Brittany associated with the CHRU (regional university hospital) of Brest.
- LS2N - Laboratory of Digital Science, Nantes, with the CNRS, the University of Nantes, the École Centrale de Nantes and INRIA.
- Subatech - Laboratory of subatomic physics and associated technologies, with the IN2P3 of the CNRS and the University of Nantes.

=== Chairs and industry partners ===
IMT Atlantique is a certified Institut Carnot for its collaborative research and is developing a policy of long-term partnerships with businesses through the creation of research facilities.

The school is a member of seven industrial chairs:

- Cybernavale (Cyber defence of naval systems) with the École Navale, Naval Group (formerly DCNS) and Thales.
- Cyber CNI (Cyber security of critical infrastructures) with Orange, Nokia, BNP Paribas, La Poste, EDF, Airbus Defense, Amossys and the Société Générale.
- Pracom (Cluster on Advanced Research in Communication) in collaboration with Safran, Mitsubishi and GDF Suez.
- C2M (Characterization, modeling and control of electromagnetic wave exposure) with Orange and Télécom ParisTech.
- STOCKAGE (Storage of radioactive waste) with EDF, the ANDRA and Areva.
- RESOH (Security at the level of inter-organizational relationships) with the IRSN, Areva and Naval Group.
- MERITE (teaching chair for the diffusion of scientific, technological and industrial culture), with Assystem.

It is also a member of two academic chairs:

- Medical imaging for interventional therapy with the Inserm.
- RITE (Risks and emerging technologies: from technological management to social regulation).

Lastly, it is also a member of 7 joint laboratories:

- ADMIRE (Distributed deep learning for the classification of Multimodal, Uncertain and Rare data in ophthalmology), with the company Evolucare Technologies.
- ATOL (Aeronautics Technico-Operational Laboratory): Started in 2005, it is a joint laboratory dedicated mainly to Man-Machine Interface prototyping with, as partners, the École Navale, Thalès Systèmes Aéroportés and Thales Underwater Systems.
- CRC-Lab with the company 4S Network and its subsidiary CRC Services, aims to optimize freight transport in the presence of hazards.
- LATERAL (Labsticc Thales research alliance on Smart On-board Sensor) with Thales-active 3D antennas for new generations of RF autosteering based on new additive technologies.
- SEPEMED (SEcurity & Processing of Externalized MEdical image Data), a joint laboratory with the MEDECOM Company.
- TESMARAC The SUBATECH laboratory and the company TRISKEM INTERNATIONAL have created this joint laboratory (LabCom) to develop new resins and new methods for separating radioisotopes, particularly in complex media.
- Lab-CIS is a joint laboratory of IMT Atlantique and the global engineering group SEGULA Technologies.

== IMT Atlantique Campus ==
=== Brest campus ===
The Brest campus, located in Plouzané, on the sea coast, is part of the major Brest-Iroise Technology hub, spanning approximately 59.65 acres, along with other universities (ENIB and ESIAB). It consists of:

- The school buildings and teaching facilities, including cutting-edge laboratories for Image and Information Processing, Microwaves, Optics, and Medical Information Processing (LaTIM), and the Arago platform (named after the famous French physicist and astronomer François Arago), which serves as a technology transfer accelerator.
- The sport facilities: an extensive infrastructure consisting of a gymnasium, an outdoor Rugby and Football pitches, a Tennis court, a weight lifting room and a dance studio.
- The restaurant: The Kernévent.
- The student housing facilities, the Maisel, consisting of 484 units.
- An incubator: a dedicated space for startup support and research-to-business development.
- An astronomical observatory: a unique scientific facility located on the Brest campus.

=== Nantes campus ===
The 13.15 hectare campus is situated on the Erdre riverbank in the Atlanpole technology hub, on the Chantrerie campus near other higher learning institutions (Oniris, École supérieure du bois, Polytech Nantes, École de design Nantes Atlantique). It consists of school buildings, sports facilities (gymnasiums, stadiums, tennis courts, and a weight lifting room), a restaurant, the student residence, and an academic incubator. The school also has student accommodation in the town center.

=== Rennes campus ===
The Rennes campus is located in Cesson-Sévigné, in Rennes Atalante, and is close to research and development centers of major companies (Orange, Technicolor) and other major players in a wide range of fields ranging from image processing, IT networks, Internet of things (IoT) and cyber security (Acklio, Broadpeak, Enensys, NexGuard, Kerlink), along with the technological research institute, b<>com. Third year options include "Networks", "International Business" and "Business and Finance". The campus is composed of the school buildings, a student residence and an incubator.

== Notable alumni ==
- Pierre Gattaz (Télécom Bretagne): Former Chairman and CEO of Radiall and former President of MEDEF, the largest federation of French employers.
- Laurence LIKFORMAN-SULEM (Télécom Bretagne): Prominent French computer scientist and Associate Professor (HDR) at Télécom Paris. Since joining the institution in 1991, her academic work has heavily influenced the fields of pattern recognition, document analysis, and artificial intelligence.
- Alioune Ndiaye (Télécom Bretagne): CEO of Orange Middle East and Africa, managing one of the largest telecommunications footprints in the world.
- Thierry Marigny (Télécom Bretagne): CEO of Orange Jordan.
- Pierre-Eric Saint-André (Télécom Bretagne): CEO of Asia Pacific for Bouygues Bâtiment International.
- Nicolas Colin (Télécom Bretagne): Co-founder of The Family and a well-known essayist on the digital economy.
- Michel Paulin (Télécom Bretagne): Current CEO of OVHcloud, the leading European cloud provider. He previously served as CEO of SFR and Orange Business Services.
- Nathalie Errard (Télécom Bretagne): Senior Vice President and Head of Europe and NATO Affairs at Airbus.
- Claude Berrou (Télécom Bretagne): While primarily known as a researcher at the school, his invention of Turbo Codes is the school’s most globally recognized technical legacy, essential for modern satellite and 3G/4G mobile communications.
- Jean-Marc Jézéquel (Télécom Bretagne): A prominent computer scientist and former director of IRISA, recognized for his influential work in software engineering.
- Imad Sabouni (Télécom Bretagne): Former Minister of Communications and Technology for Syria.

== Administration ==
=== Director ===
- January 2017 - April 2022: Paul Friedel
- From May 2022 : Christophe Lerouge

=== Chairman ===
- From January 1, 2017: Guillaume Texier, Chief Executive Officer of Rexel11

== See also ==
=== Related articles ===
- Télécom Bretagne
- École nationale supérieure des mines de Nantes
- Institut Mines-Télécom
