= Flag state =

Jurisdiction where a merchant vessel is registered

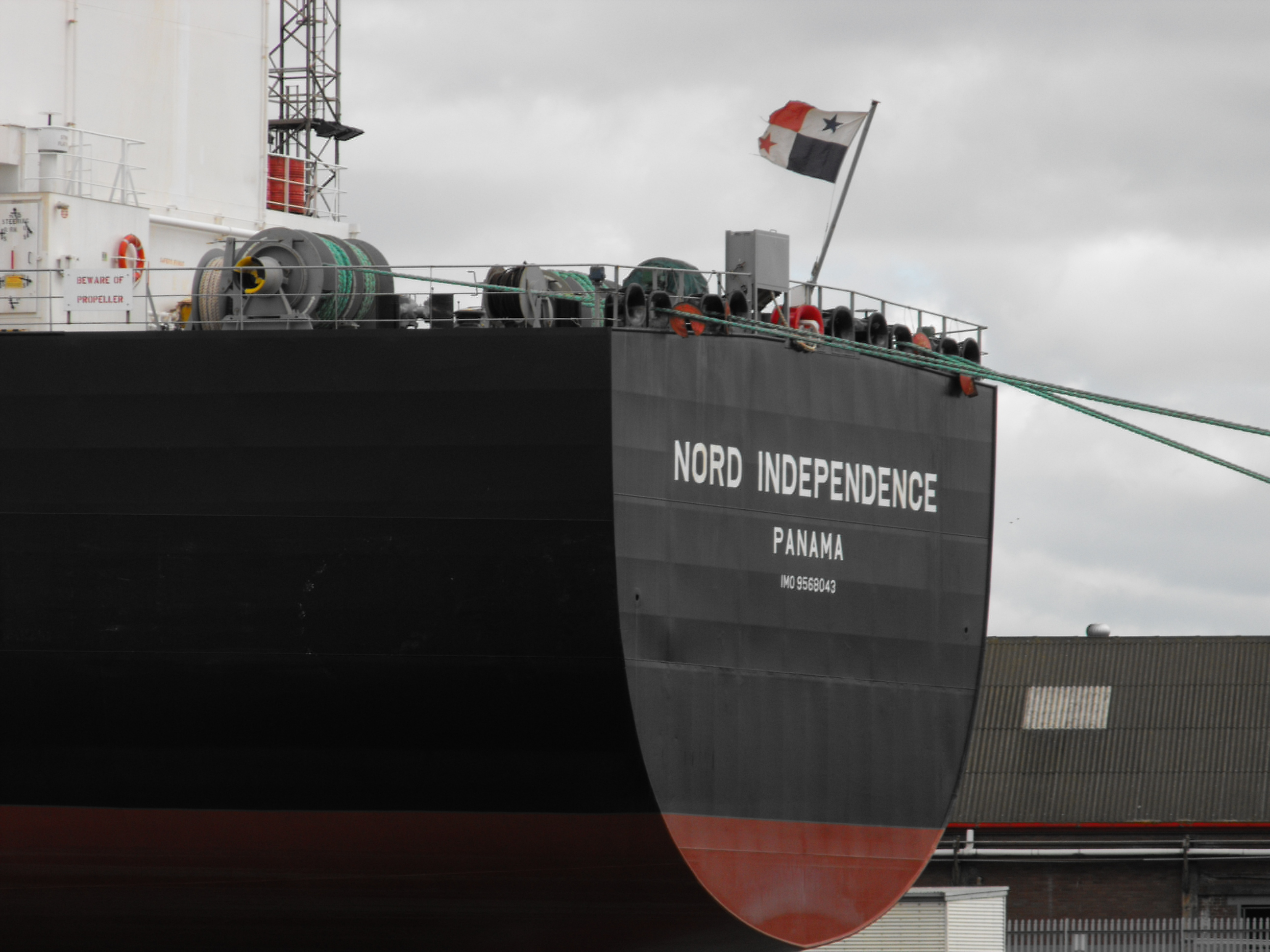
Stern of the container ship Nord Independence, showing the ship's flag state (Panama)

The flag state of a merchant vessel is the jurisdiction under whose laws the vessel is registered or licensed, and is deemed the nationality of the vessel. A merchant vessel must be registered and can only be registered in one jurisdiction, but may change the jurisdiction in which it is registered. The flag state has the authority and responsibility to enforce regulations over vessels registered under its flag, including those relating to inspection, certification, and issuance of safety and pollution prevention documents. As a ship operates under the laws of its flag state, these laws are applicable if the ship is involved in an admiralty case.

The term "flag of convenience" describes the business practice of registering a merchant ship in a state other than that of the ship's owners, and flying that state's civil ensign on the ship. Ships may be registered under flags of convenience to reduce operating costs, or else to avoid the regulations of, or inspection and scrutiny by, the country of the original owner. Normally the nationality (i.e., flag) of the ship determines the taxing jurisdiction.

Since the Flag Right Declaration of 1921, it has been recognised that all states—including land-locked countries—have a right to maintain a ship register and be a ship's flag state. Because of the failure of some flag states to comply with their survey and certification responsibilities, especially flag-of-convenience states that have delegated their task to classification societies, a number of states have since 1982 established port state controls of foreign-registered ships entering their jurisdiction.

As of May 2025, the largest flag registry was Liberia with 5052 ships

== History ==
Until World War II nations were able to maintain their dominance, or in some cases, even improve their position in maritime trade by offering vessels exclusive protection for flying their flags, which would in turn give the nation exclusive control over the vessels. Shipowners during this time needed protection from pirates and privateers which was provided by naval vessels of the flag state. In some cases, states offer subsidies to shipbuilding industries. In addition to these incentives, states might impose restrictions based on flag state, closing ports to other ships. One well known example of how this was applied is the case of England, which restricted the import of Asian goods only to American and British vessels. England only opened its ports after it had maneuverered itself into a position of strength, and then most like only to gain access to other continental ports. Similarly, France imposed a trade monopoly on its colonies which remained in place until 1869.

== Ship register ==
Ships must be registered in the ship register of the jurisdiction whose flag it is flying. Flag registers in many countries are open to ships with foreign owners. Normally, each flag state has only one ship register, but several countries have more than one register:

- Denmark, France, Norway and Portugal maintain an international register to compete with flags of convenience.
- The Kingdom of the Netherlands allows the different constituent countries to set up their own registers under the Dutch flag.
- Several territories over which the British Crown holds sovereignty have their own register. Most notably, the Isle of Man has a significant register.
- Hong Kong, the special administrative region of China, has a separate ship register, the fourth largest in the world, in addition to China's own ship registry.

== Flag state enforcement ==
Flag states must, in accordance with the United Nations Convention on the Law of the Sea (UNCLOS), ensure that ships under their flag comply with international regulations, often adopted by the UN's International Maritime Organization (IMO), on matters of safety, navigation, crewing etc. Part XII entails special provisions on protecting the marine environment, which includes placing special obligations on flag states to ensure compliance with international environmental legislation such as MARPOL. Failure to do so can result in the flag state losing jurisdiction over ships under its flag, even when they commit violations on the high seas.

== Flag state control ==
Each flag state has set up its own flag state control system:

- In Australia, the Australian Maritime Safety Authority (AMSA) provides flag state control.
- In Canada, Transport Canada is responsible for flag state control under the Canada Shipping Act, 2001.
- In France, the Ships Safety Centers are in charge of Flag state control.
- In Hong Kong, the Marine Department is responsible for flag state control and enforcement under the Flag State Quality Control Scheme.
- In India, the Directorate General of Shipping is responsible for life, health, vessel and the environment for Indian registered ships and ships at Indian ports.
- In the United Kingdom, the Maritime and Coastguard Agency (MCA) is responsible for flag state control.
- In the United States, the Coast Guard, under the authority of various federal laws, regulations and international conventions and treaties, the Officer in Charge Marine Inspections is responsible for the inspection of US flag vessels to ensure compliance operating throughout the world.
- In Vanuatu, the Vanuatu Maritime Authority has the responsibility to enforce maritime laws and exercise flag state control.

== Abuse of ship registers ==
Some flag-states are known as flags of convenience. These are the flags of states in which foreign ship owners or shipping companies register in order to reduce costs, avoid or reduce taxes, and take advantage of lower social and safety regulations.

Ships of Russia’s shadow fleet, which transport sanctioned cargo, especially crude oil, frequently change their flag registrations. Because of this, previously tiny ship registries including Gabon, Eswatini, the Comoros, and Guinea-Bissau have become significant participants in global shipping since 2022. According to a report of the Atlantic Council, the registration process is so permissive that virtually any vessel can register, even ones turned down by other flag-of-convenience states. Small registers have a lack of maritime expertise and infrastructure and often refuse to or cannot take the action required of flag states if one of their vessels causes an accident or incident.

== Sources ==
- Mansell, J.N.K. (2009): Flag State Responsibility: Historical Development and Contemporary Issues, Springer.
- Jesper Jarl Fanø (2019). Enforcing International Maritime Legislation on Air Pollution through UNCLOS. Hart Publishing.
