= Draft survey =

A draft survey is a calculation of the weight of cargo loaded or unloaded to or from a ship from measurements of changes in its displacement. The technique is based on Archimedes' principle. The procedure is standardized by the United Nations Economic Commission for Europe for the measurement of coal cargoes.

== Procedure ==
The draft survey is performed by reading the ship's draft on the draft markings at six standard points on the hull: forward, midships and aft on both port and starboard sides. Corrections for factors such as trim, water density and non-cargo weight changes are made before calculating the cargo weight change.
