= Patrick Jaillet =

French-American electrical engineer and computer scientist

Patrick Jaillet is an American electrical engineer and computer scientist. He is the Dugald C. Jackson Professor in the Department of Electrical Engineering and Computer Science at Massachusetts Institute of Technology. His research interests include online and data-focused optimization.

Jaillet was elected to the 2013 class of Fellows of the Institute for Operations Research and the Management Sciences. He gave the Wasserstrom Lecture at Northwestern University in 2014, the Warren Lecture at the University of Minnesota in 2008, and the Tow Lecture at the University of Iowa in 2008.

== Education ==
Jaillet received a PhD from MIT in 1985.
