= Côtes-d'Armor's 2nd constituency =

Constituency of the National Assembly of France

2nd constituency of the Côtes-d'Armor
- inline Constituency of the National Assembly of France

- Constituency in department

- Côtes-d'Armor in France
- Deputy: Hervé Berville; RE
- Department: Côtes-d'Armor
- Cantons: Châtelaudren, Langueux, Plérin, Ploufragan, Saint-Brieuc Nord, Saint-Brieuc Ouest, Saint-Brieuc Sud.

The 2nd constituency of the Côtes-d'Armor is a French legislative constituency in the Côtes-d'Armor département. Like the other 576 French constituencies, it elects one MP using the two-round system, with a run-off if no candidate receives over 50% of the vote in the first round.

== Deputies ==
| Election | Member | Party |
|---|---|---|
| 1958 | René Pléven | Entente Démocratique |
| 1962 | René Pléven | CD |
| 1967 | René Pléven | CD |
| 1968 | René Pléven | CD |
| 1973 | Charles Josselin | PS |
| 1978 | René Benoît | UDF |
| 1981 | Charles Josselin | PS |
| 1986 | Proportional representation - no election by constituency | |
| 1988 | Charles Josselin | PS |
| 1993 | Charles Josselin | PS |
| 1997 | Charles Josselin | PS |
| 2002 | Jean Gaubert | PS |
| 2012 | Viviane Le Dissez | PS |
| 2017 | Hervé Berville | LREM |
| 2022 | Hervé Berville | LREM |
| 2024 | Hervé Berville | RE |

== Election results ==
=== 2024 ===
| Candidate | Party | Alliance | First round | | | Second round | | |
| Candidate | Party | Alliance | Votes | % | +/– | Votes | % | +/– |
|---|---|---|---|---|---|---|---|---|
| Hervé Berville | RE | Ensemble | 25,730 | 33.61 | -3.30 | 47,119 | 63.63 | +7.80 |
| Antoine Kieffer | RN | | 23,707 | 30.96 | +14.50 | 26,935 | 36.37 | new |
| Jérémy Dauphin | LE | NFP | 19,685 | 25.71 | -0.12 | withdrew | | |
| Michel Desbois | LR | UDC | 5,946 | 7.77 | -2.46 | | | |
| Logan Maheu | REG | | 859 | 1.12 | new | | | |
| Lucie Herblin | LO | | 636 | 0.83 | -0.05 | | | |
| Votes | | | 76,563 | 100.00 | | 74,054 | 100.00 | |
| Valid votes | | | 76,563 | 97.91 | -0.07 | 74,054 | 94.47 | +1.92 |
| Blank votes | | | 958 | 1.23 | -0.11 | 3,090 | 3.94 | -1.03 |
| Null votes | | | 676 | 0.86 | +0.19 | 1,244 | 1.59 | -0.89 |
| Turnout | | | 78,197 | 74.82 | +18.81 | 78,388 | 74.99 | +19.96 |
| Abstentions | | | 26,320 | 25.18 | -18.81 | 26,140 | 25.01 | -19.96 |
| Registered voters | | | 104,517 | | | 104,528 | | |
| Result | | | RE HOLD | | | | | |

=== 2022 ===
Legislative Election 2022: Côtes-d'Armor's 2nd constituency
| Party | Candidate | Votes | % | ±% |
|---|---|---|---|---|
| LREM (Ensemble) | Hervé Berville | 20,946 | 36.91 | -1.94 |
| EELV (NUPÉS) | Bruno Ricard | 14,659 | 25.83 | -1.25 |
| RN | Antoine Keiffer | 9,340 | 16.46 | +6.87 |
| LR | Michel Desbois* | 5,807 | 10.23 | N/A |
| REC | Eugénie Crokaert | 1,928 | 3.40 | N/A |
| Others | N/A | 4,065 | 7.16 | |
| Turnout | | 56,745 | 56.01 | −2.00 |
2nd round result
| LREM (Ensemble) | Hervé Berville | 29,411 | 55.83 | -8.34 |
| EELV (NUPÉS) | Bruno Ricard | 23,264 | 44.17 | N/A |
| Turnout | | 52,675 | 55.03 | +6.10 |
| LREM hold | | | | |

=== 2017 ===
| Candidate | Label | First round | | Second round | |
| Candidate | Label | Votes | % | Votes | % |
|---|---|---|---|---|---|
| Hervé Berville | REM | 21,317 | 38.85 | 26,834 | 64.17 |
| Didier Déru | LR | 7,576 | 13.81 | 14,980 | 35.83 |
| Viviane Le Dissez | PS | 6,696 | 12.20 | | |
| Didier Giffrain | FI | 6,572 | 11.98 | | |
| Odile de Mellon | FN | 5,264 | 9.59 | | |
| Michel Desbois | DVD | 2,979 | 5.43 | | |
| Jocelyne Leclerc | ECO | 1,590 | 2.90 | | |
| Louis Bouan | DVD | 607 | 1.11 | | |
| Stuart Lesvier | REG | 569 | 1.04 | | |
| Serge Monrocq | ECO | 489 | 0.89 | | |
| Erwan Le Garlantezec | REG | 426 | 0.78 | | |
| Josette Grimaud | EXG | 358 | 0.65 | | |
| Nathan Malissen | DIV | 285 | 0.52 | | |
| David Douet | DVG | 148 | 0.27 | | |
| Votes | | 54,876 | 100.00 | 41,814 | 100.00 |
| Valid votes | | 54,876 | 97.75 | 41,814 | 88.30 |
| Blank votes | | 878 | 1.56 | 3,992 | 8.43 |
| Null votes | | 384 | 0.68 | 1,550 | 3.27 |
| Turnout | | 56,138 | 58.01 | 47,356 | 48.93 |
| Abstentions | | 40,638 | 41.99 | 49,420 | 51.07 |
| Registered voters | | 96,776 | | 96,776 | |
Source: Ministry of the Interior

=== 2012 ===
2012 legislative election in Cotes-D'Armor's 2nd constituency
| Candidate | Party | First round | | Second round | |
| Candidate | Party | Votes | % | Votes | % |
|---|---|---|---|---|---|
| Viviane Le Dissez | PS | 25,090 | 42.43% | 33,812 | 57.96% |
| Michel Vaspart | UMP | 16,355 | 27.66% | 24,523 | 42.04% |
| Gérard De Mellon | FN | 5,471 | 9.25% | | |
| Didier Lechien | AC | 4,383 | 7.41% | | |
| Didier Giffrain | FG | 2,813 | 4.76% | | |
| Michel Forget | EELV | 2,375 | 4.02% | | |
| Yves Pelle | PB | 701 | 1.19% | | |
| Nadia Chikh | ?? | 600 | 1.01% | | |
| Julien Roger | NPA | 506 | 0.86% | | |
| Alexandra Leroy | LO | 318 | 0.54% | | |
| Drifa Belarbi | NC | 274 | 0.46% | | |
| Christophe Ollivier | POI | 245 | 0.41% | | |
| Valid votes | | 59,131 | 98.16% | 58,335 | 96.66% |
| Spoilt and null votes | | 1,110 | 1.84% | 1,816 | 3.01% |
| Votes cast / turnout | | 60,241 | 64.23% | 60,351 | 64.36% |
| Abstentions | | 33,547 | 35.77% | 33,427 | 35.64% |
| Registered voters | | 93,788 | 100.00% | 93,778 | 100.00% |

=== 2007 ===
Legislative Election 2007: Côtes-d'Armor's 2nd constituency
| Party | Candidate | Votes | % | ±% |
|---|---|---|---|---|
| UMP | Michel Vaspart | 23,563 | 38.87 | |
| PS | Jean Gaubert | 23,561 | 38.86 | |
| MoDem | Anne-Marie Crolais | 4,560 | 7.52 | |
| LV | Anne-Marie Boudou | 2,204 | 3.64 | |
| LCR | Marion Doucet | 1,625 | 2.68 | |
| FN | Tiéphaine Marcais | 1,473 | 2.43 | |
| PCF | Alain Guerin | 1,272 | 2.10 | |
| Others | N/A | 2,365 | - | |
| Turnout | | 61,731 | 67.57 | |
2nd round result
| PS | Jean Gaubert | 34,636 | 54.68 | |
| UMP | Michel Vaspart | 28,705 | 45.32 | |
| Turnout | | 64,824 | 70.97 | |
| PS hold | | | | |

=== 2002 ===
Legislative Election 2002: Côtes-d'Armor's 2nd constituency
| Party | Candidate | Votes | % | ±% |
|---|---|---|---|---|
| UMP | Michel Vaspart | 23,583 | 39.75 | |
| PS | Jean Gaubert | 22,164 | 37.35 | |
| FN | Charles du Bois Hamon | 3,508 | 5.91 | |
| LV | Martine Lucas | 2,359 | 3.98 | |
| PCF | Henri Faucheur | 1,477 | 2.49 | |
| Others | N/A | 6,243 | - | |
| Turnout | | 60,747 | 70.57 | |
2nd round result
| PS | Jean Gaubert | 29,752 | 50.12 | |
| UMP | Michel Vaspart | 29,605 | 49.88 | |
| Turnout | | 61,115 | 71.01 | |
| PS hold | | | | |

=== 1997 ===
Legislative Election 1997: Côtes-d'Armor's 2nd constituency
| Party | Candidate | Votes | % | ±% |
|---|---|---|---|---|
| PS | Charles Josselin | 25,744 | 44.48 | |
| FD (UDF) | Didier Lechien | 9,611 | 16.61 | |
| RPR | Michel Vaspart* | 9,334 | 16.13 | |
| FN | Charles de Boishamon | 4,277 | 7.39 | |
| PCF | Henry Faucheur | 3,412 | 5.89 | |
| LV | Martine Lucas | 2,175 | 3.76 | |
| GE | Bernard Hesry | 1,804 | 3.12 | |
| LDI | Dominique Boilot | 1,012 | 1.75 | |
| UDF | Bernard Aubin** | 315 | 0.54 | |
| DVD | Daniel Houres | 196 | 0.34 | |
| Turnout | | 60,800 | 74.41 | |
2nd round result
| PS | Charles Josselin | 35,806 | 60.18 | |
| FD (UDF) | Didier Lechien | 23,693 | 39.82 | |
| Turnout | | 62,915 | 77.01 | |
| PS hold | | | | |

* RPR dissident
** UDF dissident

== Sources ==
- Official results of French elections from 1998: "Résultats électoraux officiels en France" (in French). Archived from the original on 20 December 2011.
