= Yacht Safety Bureau =

The Yacht Safety Bureau, Inc. (YSB) was a non-profit corporation organized under the membership corporation law of the State of New York that provided safety and testing standards for the marine industry in the United States. Located in Westwood, New Jersey, the YSB developed boat safety tests, developed test equipment for these tests, and wrote standards for such testing, completely independently of commercial interests. It later became the Marine Department of Underwriters' Laboratories.

The Yacht Safety Bureau created test standards. Another company, the American Boat and Yacht Council set performance standards.

== History ==
The Bureau was established in 1947/48 by Ed S. Terwilliger based on work begun by E. D. Wright, a marine surveyor, as an independent, privately owned organization. The funding came from a group of insurance companies (yacht underwriters) and from National Association of Engine & Boat Manufacturers, Inc. (NAEBM). The board of directors was evenly divided between marine insurance companies and boat manufacturers.

Early work included inspecting boat yards and writing reports on boat storage yards. Investigations into marine accidents lead to standards for testing of individual items of marine equipment. Reports developed as a result of these investigations became guides to underwriters and their surveyors and to boat builders.

With United States Coast Guard cooperation, the American Boat and Yacht Council was formed to develop recommended practices and standards for boats and their equipment with reference to safety.

In 1959, the Yacht Safety Bureau was reorganized as a non-profit public service membership corporation in the State of New York with no change of its name. It provided a testing laboratory and labeling service for boats and their equipment.

In 1969, it became the Marine Department of Underwriters' Laboratories.

== Sources ==
- Product Safety: The Story of the Yacht Safety Bureau, by E.S. Terwilliger as told to Art Stout, July 1962 Issue of The Boating Industry.
