= State Secretariat for the Sea =

French State Secretariat

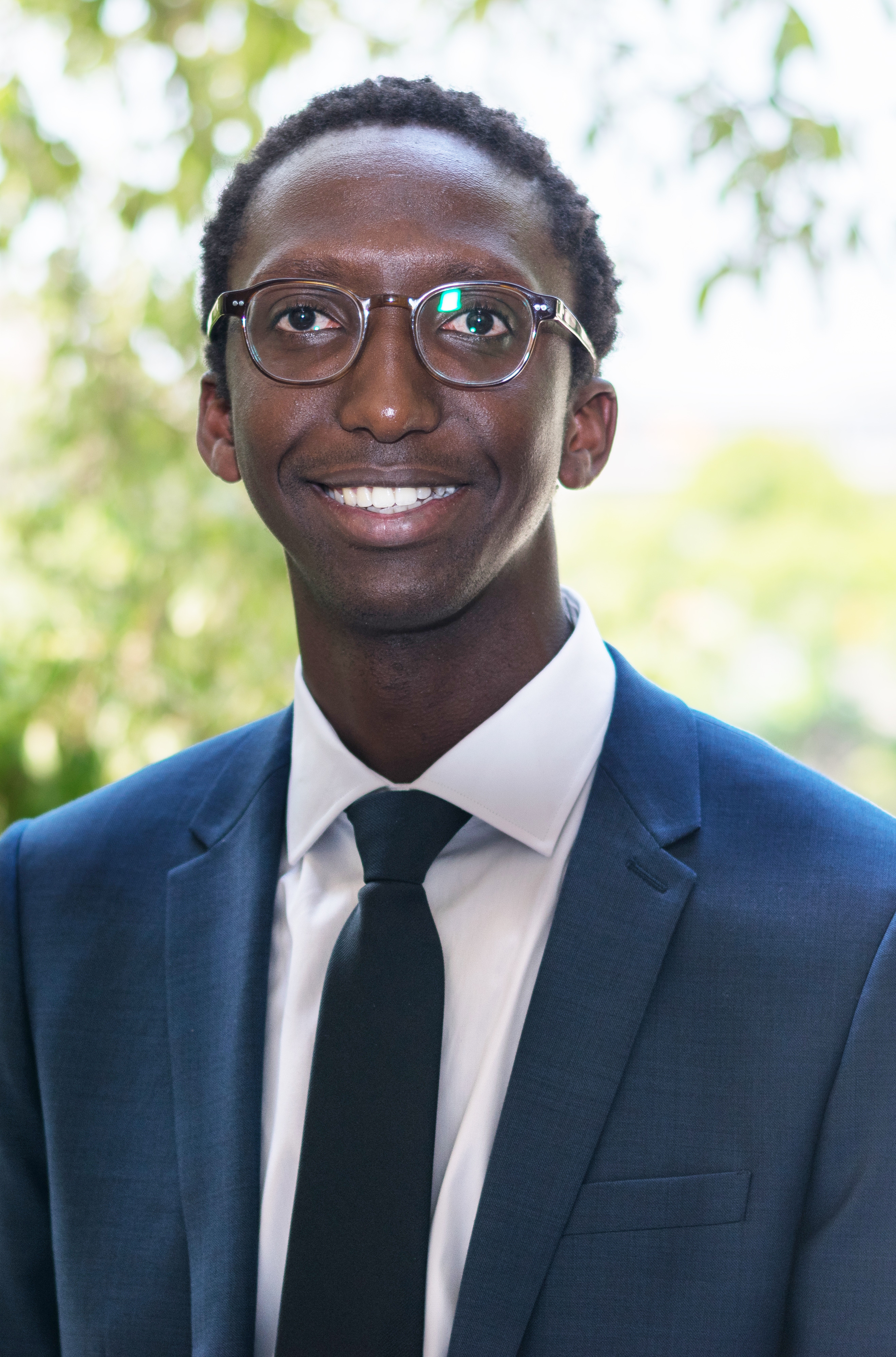
Hervé Berville, Secretary of State in charge of the Sea.

State Secretariat for the Sea (Secrétariat d'État chargé de la Mer) is a French State Secretariat directly under the authority of the Prime Minister of France. Its mission is to develop and implement the government's policy in the field of the sea in its various aspects.

== Mission ==
The Secretariat of State for the Sea develops and implements the government's policy in the field of the sea in its various aspects, national and international, particularly in terms of maritime economy, maritime influence and impact.

== Organization ==
- Secretary of State to the Prime Minister, in charge of the Sea: Hervé Berville.

The Secretary of State for the Sea has authority, by delegation from the Prime Minister, over the General Inspectorate of Maritime Affairs and, jointly with the Minister of Agriculture and Food Sovereignty, over the Directorate general for Maritime affairs, Fisheries and Aquaculture. He has authority, by delegation from the Prime Minister, jointly with the Minister for Ecological Transition and Territorial Cohesion and the Minister for Energy Transition, over the general secretariat and the general commission for sustainable development.

In particular, the General Secretariat for the Sea is at his disposal. The State Secretariat for the Sea relies, in metropolitan France and overseas, on services and departments present in the regions and departments.
