= Port state control =

Mechanism for international shipping inspection

Signatories to the Paris MOU (blue), Tokyo MOU (red), Indian Ocean MOU (green), Acuerdo de Viña del Mar (yellow), Caribbean MOU (olive), Abuja MOU (dark red), Mediterranean MOU (dark green), Black Sea MOU (cyan), and Riyadh MOU (navy).

Port state control (PSC) is an inspection regime for countries to inspect foreign-registered ships in port other than those of the flag state and take action against ships that are not in compliance. Inspectors for PSC are called PSC officers (PSCOs), and are required to investigate compliance with the requirements of international conventions, such as SOLAS, MARPOL, STCW, and the MLC. Inspections can involve checking that the vessel is crewed and operated in compliance with applicable international law, and verifying the competency of the ship's master and officers, and the ship's condition and equipment.

== History ==
In 1978, a number of European countries agreed in The Hague on a memorandum for the audit of labour conditions on board vessels as to whether they were in accordance with the rules of the ILO. After the Amoco Cadiz sank that year, it was decided to also audit safety and pollution practices. To this end, in 1982 fourteen European countries agreed on the Paris Memorandum of Understanding on Port State Control (Paris MoU) to establish port state control. Currently, 26 European countries and Canada are signatories of Paris MoU. PSC was a reaction to the failure of those flag states – especially flag of convenience states – that had delegated their survey and certification responsibilities to classification societies.

Modeled on the Paris MOU, several other regional MOUs have been signed, including the Tokyo MOU (Pacific Ocean), Acuerdo Latinoamericano de Viña del Mar (South and Central America), the Caribbean MOU, the Mediterranean MOU, the Indian Ocean MOU, the Abuja MOU (West and Central Atlantic Africa), the Black Sea MOU, and the Riyadh MOU (Persian Gulf).

== Inspection and enforcement ==
The port state control (PSC) makes inspection of ships in port, taken by a port state control officer (PSCO). Detention of the ship is the last course of action that a PSCO would take upon finding deficiencies aboard the vessel.

Courses of action a PSCO may impose on a ship with deficiencies (in order of ascending gravity) are:

1. Deficiencies can be rectified within 14 days for minor infractions.
2. Under specific conditions, deficiencies can be rectified when the ship arrives at the next port.
3. Deficiencies must be rectified before the ship can depart the port.
4. Detention of the ship occurs.

== Jurisdiction ==
The countries that implement PSC are referred to as port states. This term was established in UNCLOS, but the approach had been applied since ancient times.

Port states effectively establish jurisdiction over foreign-flagged seagoing vessels visiting the ports of a port state. This jurisdiction is distinct from the one set up by the coastal states in their maritime zones, primarily due to two considerations:

- from the legal point of view, vessels that voluntarily entered a port can no longer claim the right of innocent passage;
- at the practical level, port represents a convenient point of control.

Port states can, in addition to detention, sanction violations with fines. Port states can also in certain cases, for example if a ship violates the 0.5% sulphur limit of MARPOL Annex VI, assert jurisdiction for such violations which occur on the high seas. The extraterritorial jurisdictional basis for such enforcement and sanctioning is found within the special provisions of part XII of the United Nations Convention on the Law of the Sea (UNCLOS).

== Sources ==
- Marten, B. (2013). Port State Jurisdiction and the Regulation of International Merchant Shipping. Hamburg Studies on Maritime Affairs. Springer International Publishing. ISBN 978-3-319-00351-1.
