= Law enforcement in France =

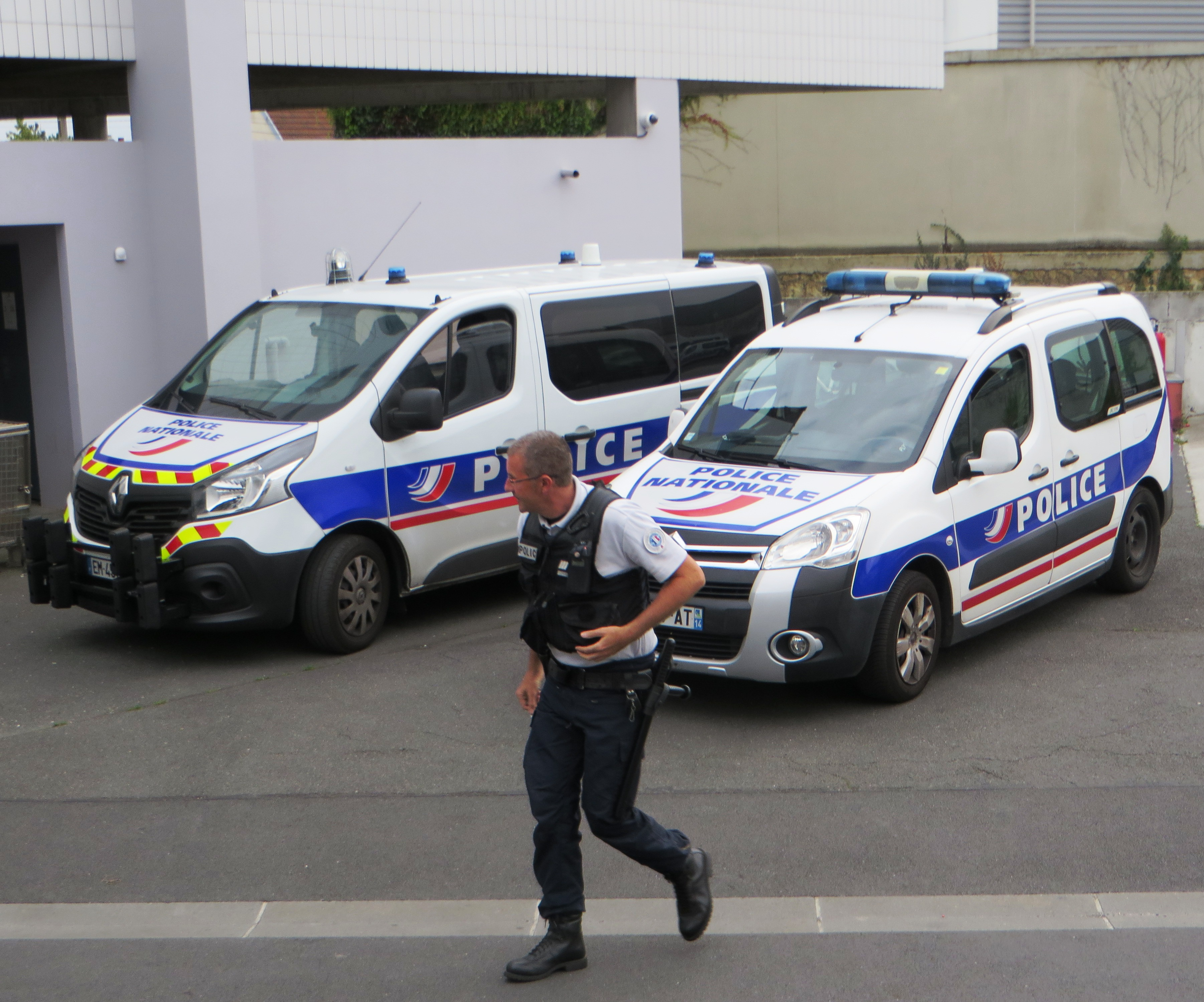
French policeman with van and a car

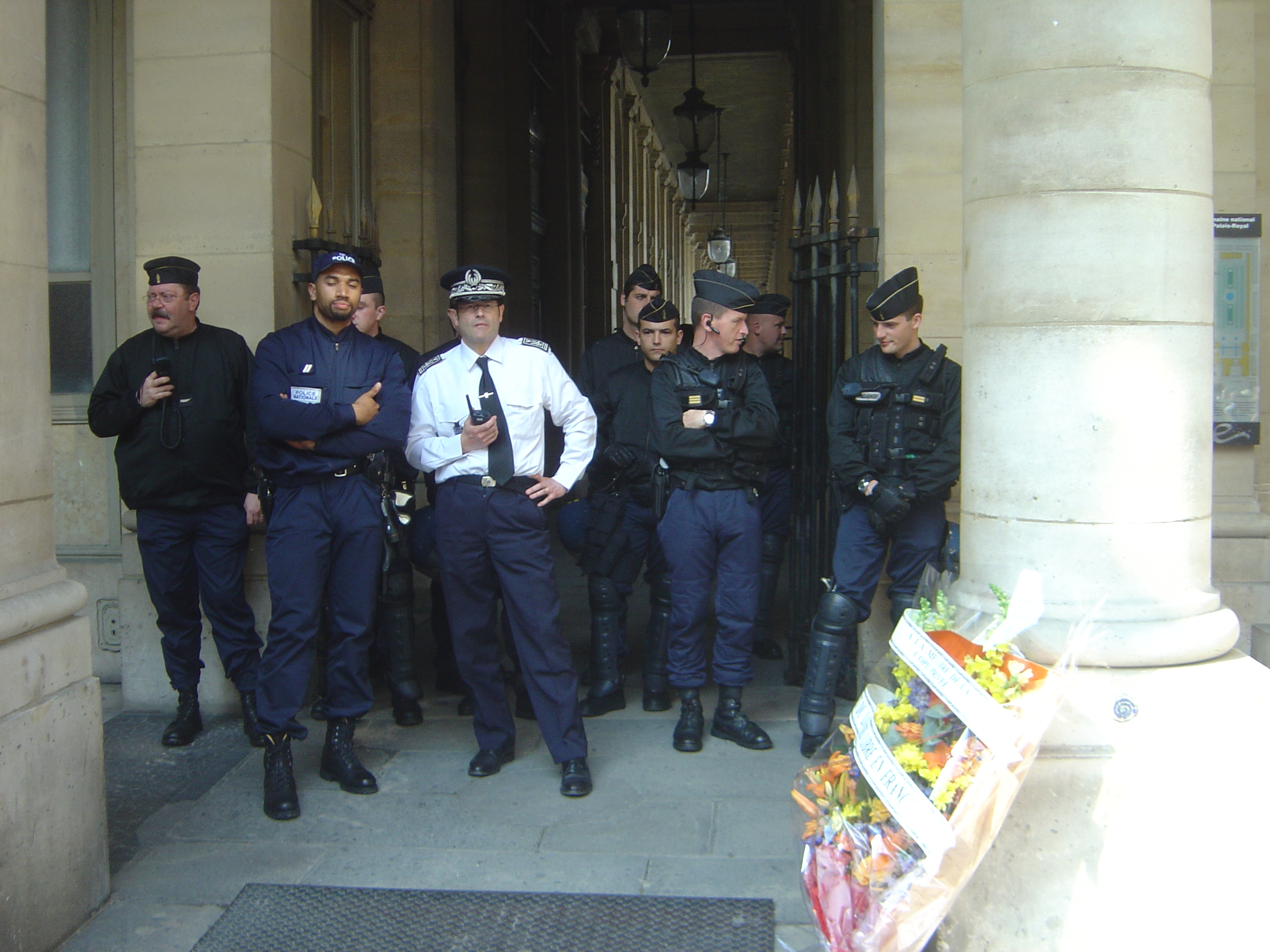
Both French National Police and French Gendarmerie Nationale

Law enforcement in France is centralized at the national level. Recently, legislation has allowed local governments to hire their own police officers which are called the police municipale.

There are two national police forces, the National Police and the National Gendarmerie. The Prefecture of Police of Paris provides policing services directly to Paris as a subdivision of France's Ministry of the Interior. Within these national forces, only certain designated police officers have the power to conduct criminal investigations, which are supervised by investigative magistrates.

== History ==
Law enforcement has a long history dating back to AD 570 when night watch systems were commonplace.

== Organizations ==
=== National agencies ===
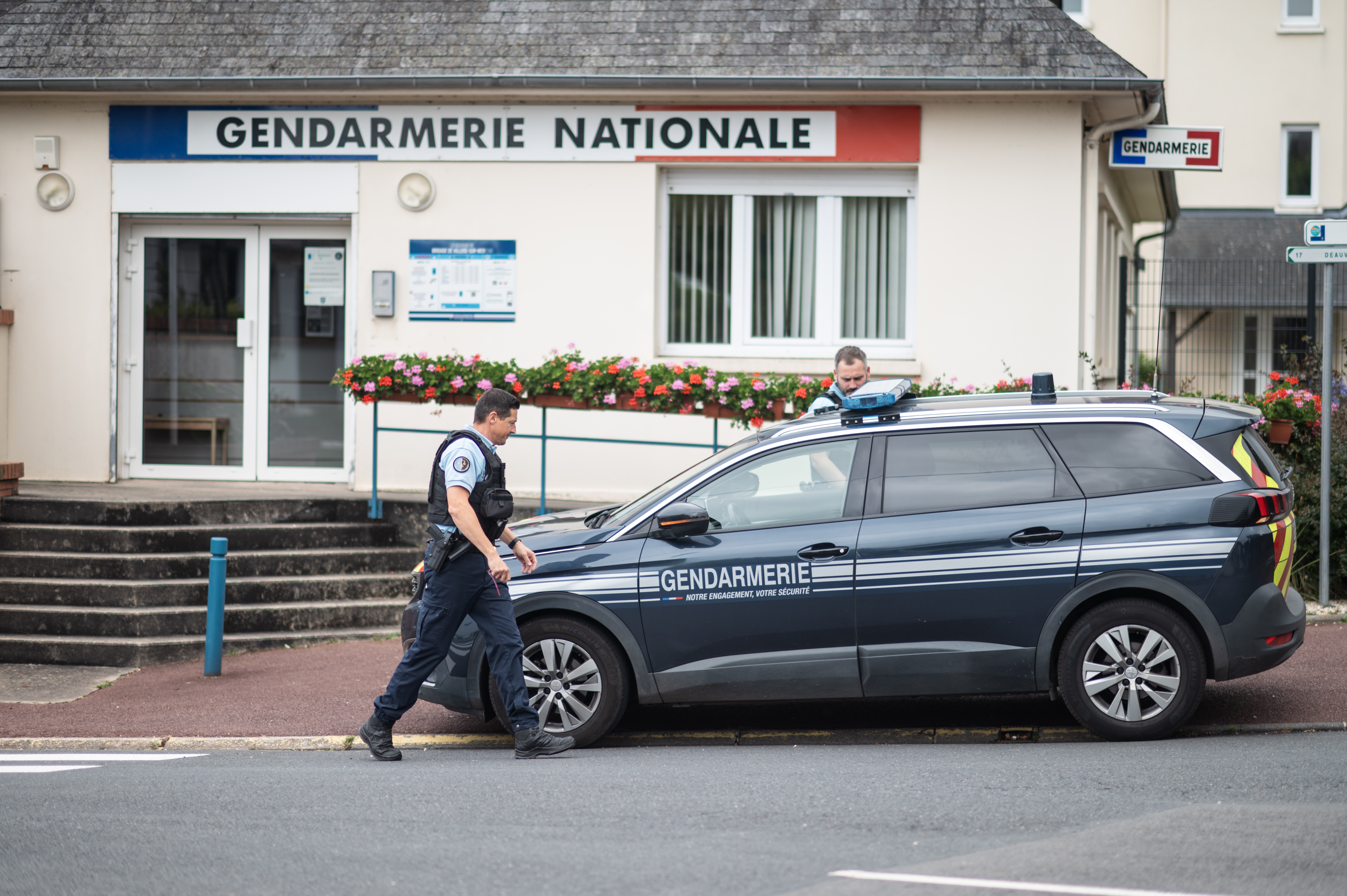
French gendarmes

France has two national police forces:

- The National Police (Police nationale), formerly called the "Sûreté", is considered a civilian police force. Its origins date back to 1812 and was created by Eugène François Vidocq. In 1966, its name was officially changed to "Police nationale". It has primary responsibility for major cities and large urban areas. The Police nationale are under the control of the Ministry of the Interior; its strength is roughly 149,000. The Paris Police Prefecture, directly controlled by the French Minister of the Interior (France), who are assisted by the "Direction de la prévention, de la sécurité et de la protection" (DPSP) (Prevention, Security and Protection Directorate) is composed of Agents with municipal police powers titled inspecteurs de sécurité (Security Inspectors). This is one of the few exceptions to the General Directorate's exclusive control.
- The National Gendarmerie (Gendarmerie nationale) is part of the French Armed Forces. It has the primary responsibility for policing smaller towns and rural areas as well as the armed forces and military installations, airport security and shipping ports. Being a military force, the gendarmerie has a highly centralized organization structure. It is under the control of both the Ministry of Defence and the Ministry of the Interior (as far as its civil duties are concerned). The Gendarmerie's origin dates back to 1306 when King Philippe le Bel (Philip the Fair) formed the first mounted military police force called the "Maréchaussée". Between 1697 and 1699, King Louis XIV asserted his authority over police in France and the Maréchaussée became the formal law enforcement arm of the country. In February 1791, it was renamed gendarmerie nationale by the revolutionary government of France. It includes a coast guard agency, the Maritime Gendarmerie (Gendarmerie maritime). Today, there are about 102,000 gendarmes in France.

Their main tasks include the fight against drug trafficking, terrorism, gang activities, damages to property and persons, riots, illegal immigration, money laundering and road traffic offenses, maintaining public safety, securing important events, solving criminal cases, helping and rescuing victims of human-made and natural disasters and for the Gendarmerie only, the surveillance of some important infrastructures, like airports, nuclear power plants and military sites.

=== Other agencies ===
==== National level ====
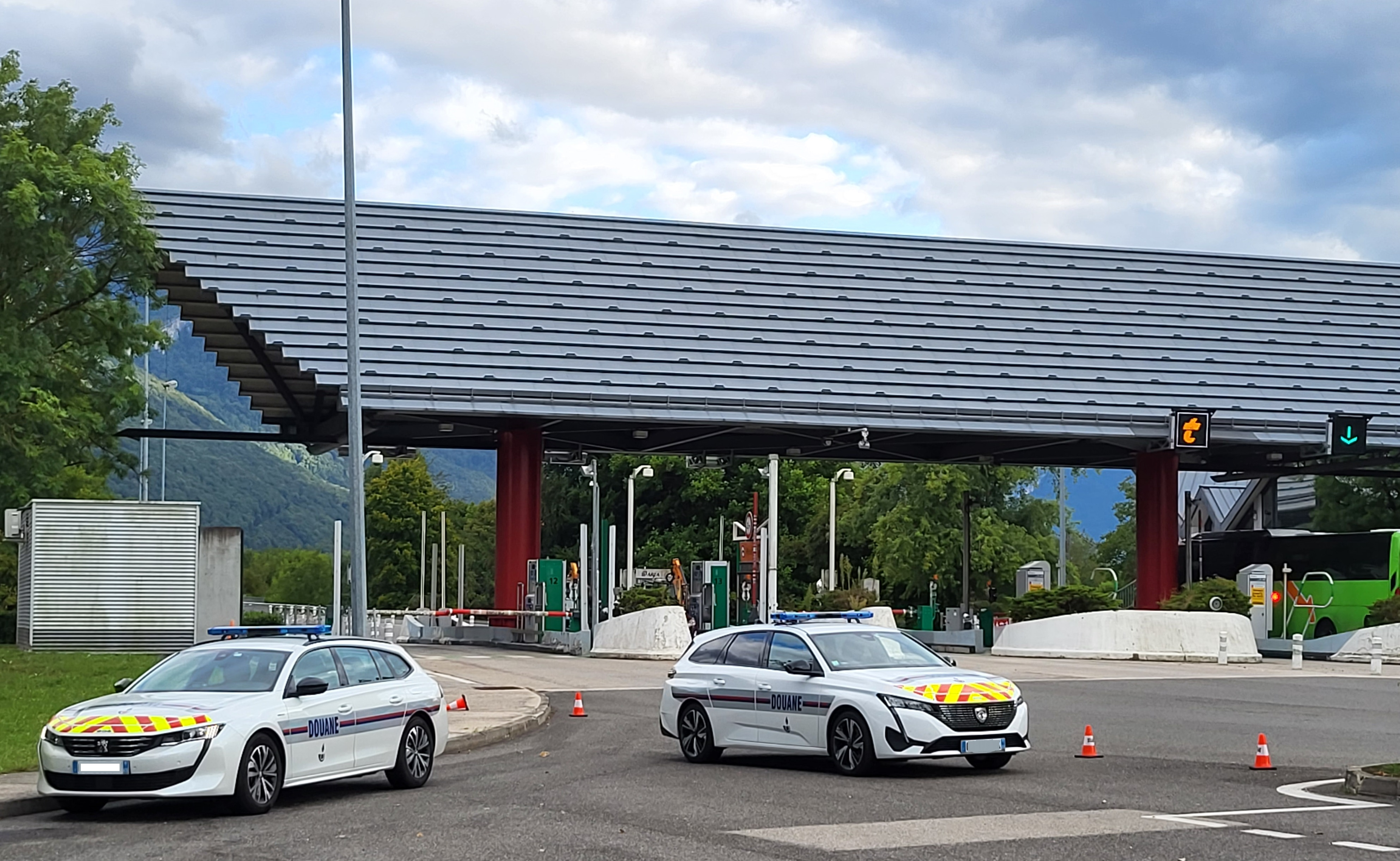
Cars of the Customs administration, at a French toll

- The General Directorate for Internal Security (Direction générale de la Sécurité Intérieure or DGSI) came into existence in 2008, initially as the Central Directorate of Internal Intelligence (Direction centrale du renseignement intérieur (DCRI)). The DCRI combined two services of the National Police HQ. The Central Directorate for General Intelligence (Direction Centrale des Renseignements généraux (RG)) was tasked with intelligence data gathering, classification and analysis. The Directorate for Surveillance of the Territory (Direction de la surveillance du territoire (DST)) was a plainclothes operational service tasked with counterespionage, counterterrorism and economic security. In 2014 the DCRI was taken out of the structure of the National Police and directly subordinated to the Ministry of the Interior as a separate agency and the name of the DCRI was changed to General Directorate of Internal Intelligence. The service is informally known as the RG by the abbreviation of the former Central Directorate of General Intelligence.
- The Directorate-general of Customs and Indirect Taxes (Direction générale des Douanes et Droits indirects or DGDDI), a nowadays civilian customs service more commonly known as the "Douanes", under the minister of budget, public accounting and civil servants; its strength is roughly 17,000 customs officers. It operates mainly on a different framework of the other agencies. Its main tasks regarding law enforcement are the fight against drug, counterfeit goods and protected species trafficking, evasion of customs duties, importation of non-compliant goods, alcohol and tobacco smuggling, money laundering and illegal immigration and the surveillance of French borders and territorial waters. It includes a coast guard agency, the Directorate-national of the Customs coast guards (Direction nationale des Garde-côtes des Douanes or DNGCD);
- The judicial tax officers (officiers fiscaux judiciaires, often called by their acronym OFJ) of the Directorate-general of Public Finances (Direction générale des Finances publiques or DGFiP) are armed investigators of the tax administration in charge of repressing serious and potentially dangerous tax crime situations, sometimes linked with organized crime. They are closely working with police and customs services. There are around 50 judicial tax officers;
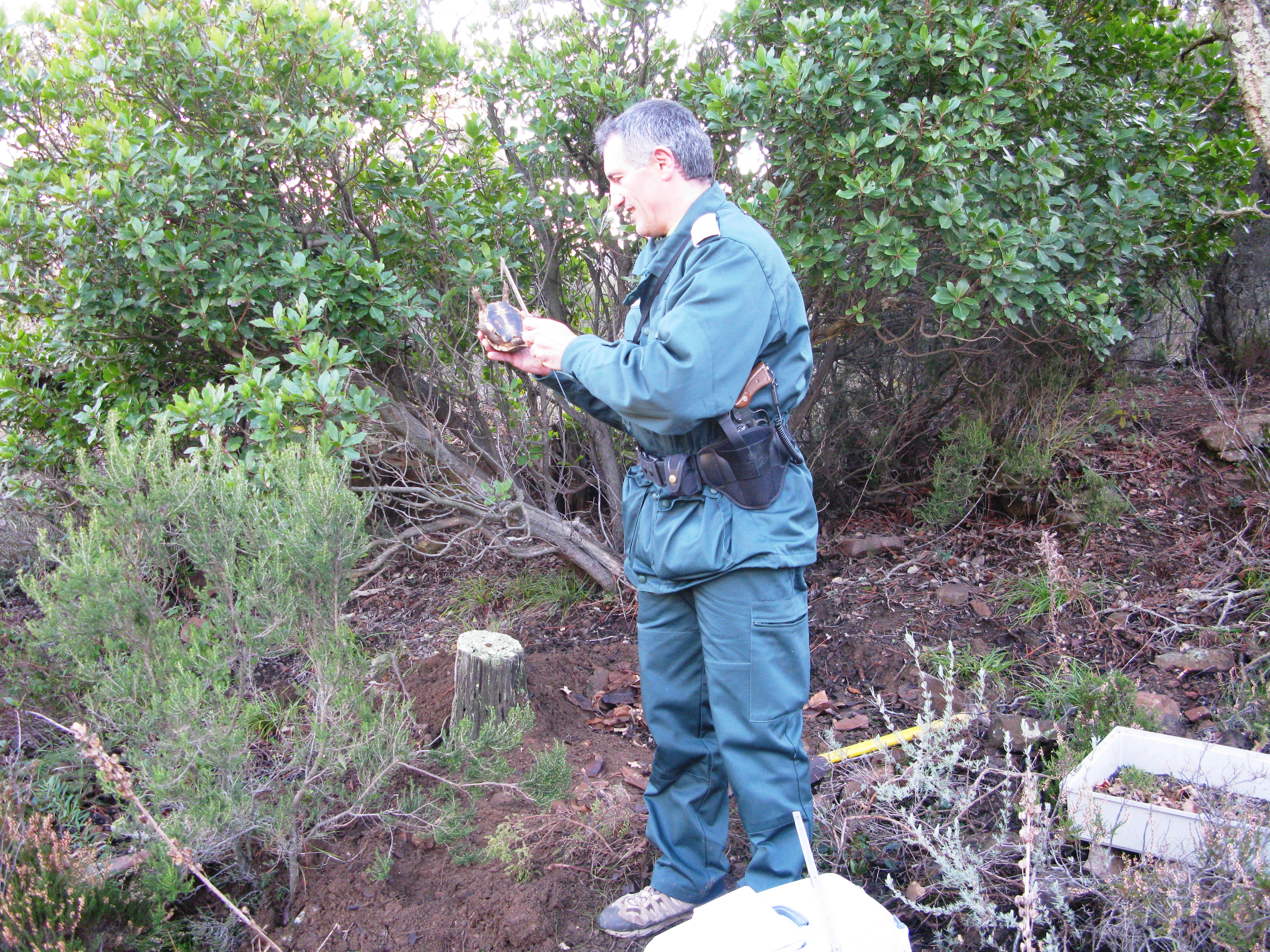
  Captain of the National Forests Office measuring a seized tortoise before releasing it into nature in 2008
- The National Forests Office (Office national des Forêts or ONF) is the continuation of the Water and Forests military corp founded in 1291 and today under both the Ministry of environment and the Ministry of Agriculture. Its main tasks regarding law enforcement are the fight against forest degradation, poaching and pollution, the surveillance of state-owned forests and the control of hunting licenses. Its strength is roughly 8,000 forest rangers;
- The French Office for Biodiversity (Office français de la Biodiversité or OFB) is mainly responsible for the monitoring of French wildlife. Its main tasks regarding law enforcement include the fight against environment degradation, poaching, pollution and protected species trafficking, the control of hunting and fishing licenses and the surveillance of French national parks and marine parks. Its strength is roughly 3,000 wildlife officers, fishery officers, national park rangers and marine park rangers;
- The Prison Administration (Administration pénitentiaire) is the public service of the Ministry of Justice responsible for the execution of court decisions in criminal matters and to promote the social reintegration of persons entrusted to it by the judicial authority. Its action is based on 187 penitentiary establishments and 104 penitentiary integration and probation services (SPIP) distributed within ten interregional directorates of penitentiary services (DISP) in mainland France and overseas, placed under the authority of the Department of Prison Administration (DAP) whose current director is Laurent Ridel. Its strength is roughly 41,000 prison officers. French prison officers are not armed, except when transferring prisoners or when restoring order during prison riots.
- The Directorate general for Maritime affairs, Fisheries and Aquaculture (Direction générale des Affaires maritimes, de la Pêche et de l'Aquaculture or DGAMPA) commonly known as the "Affaires maritimes" is the coast guard agency of the State Secretariat for the Sea. Its main tasks regarding law enforcement are the surveillance of marine traffic and fisheries and the fight against marine pollution and poaching at sea. Today there are about 3,000 coast guards of the Maritime Affairs;
- The Railway Security Agency (Sûreté ferroviaire or SuGe) of the SNCF, the Network Protection and Safety Group (Groupe de Protection et de Sécurité des Réseaux or GPSR) of the RATP Group and the Support and Protection Group (Groupe d'Assistance et de Protection or GAP) of the RTM Group are responsible for maintaining security in stations, on trains and in subway stations of their respective public transport group. Their powers are far more limited than those of the Police, Gendarmerie and Customs officers. The agents of the GAP are not armed contrary to those of the SuGe and the GPSR. Their combined strength is roughly 4,000 railway security officers. The SNCF, the RATP and the RTM are also employing non-armed controllers in charge of checking the validity of the tickets of the passengers;
- The Metropolitan Support and Assistance Ships of the Navy (Marine nationale) carry out missions of law enforcement in the French territorial waters, such as the fight against maritime pollution and illegal immigration, acting as a military coast guard agency;
- The military of the Opération Sentinelle are present in sensitive public areas, such as railway stations and tourist zones, to protect them from terrorist threats, also assisting conventional law enforcement agencies. They are mainly military of the Army (Armée de Terre).

Many other administrations and public bodies carry out investigations and repressions of offenses, but due to the nature of their tasks, they are not regarded as law enforcement agencies.

==== Local level ====
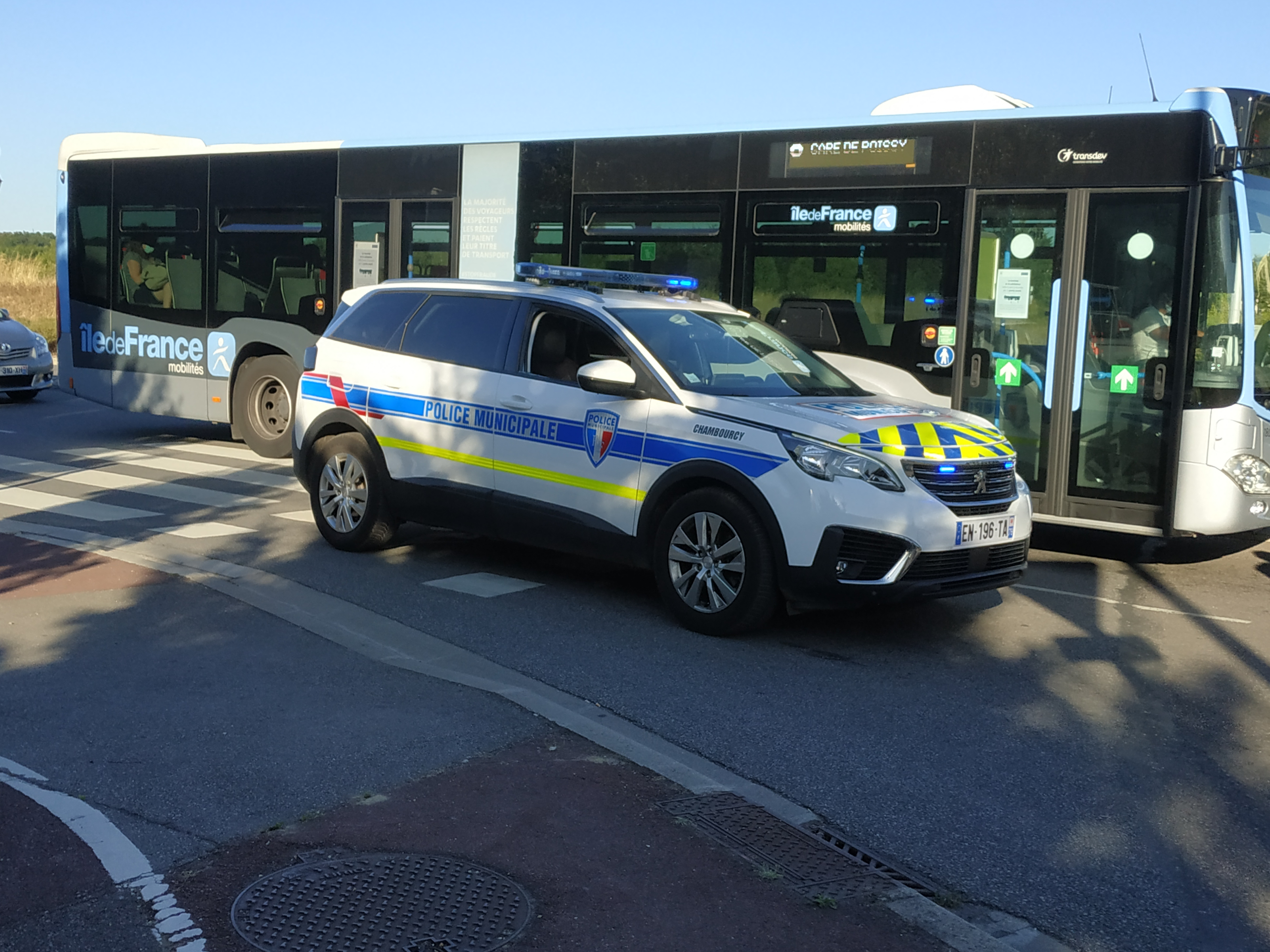
Vehicle of the municipal police of Chambourcy

The municipal policemen are Agent de police judiciaire adjoint (see below). There are also local police in the rural zones, as for the rural policemen the police rurale as such does not exist. Note the heterogeneity of local police both in means and in equipment.

- The municipal police (Polices municipales) are the local police of towns and cities in France, dating back to the Middle Ages. The municipal police officers are under the direct authority of the mayor. They may be armed at the request of the mayor and with the approval of the prefect, but it is not always the case. Their main tasks are the maintenance of safety in town, the fight against environment degradation and road traffic offenses and the reinforcement of the National Police and Gendarmerie forces when it is needed. There are roughly 24,000 municipal police officers in 4,555 communities;
- The rural guards (gardes champêtres) are the equivalent of municipal police officers but for smaller towns and villages. They are under the direct authority of the mayor. Like municipal police officers they may be armed at the request of the mayor and with the approval of the prefect, though it is not always the case. They have the same tasks as their urban counterparts. Today, there are roughly 1,000 rural guards in France;
- The public roads surveillance officers (agents de surveillance de la voie publique, often called by their acronym ASVP) are responsible for the fight against road traffic offenses, environment degradation and minor disturbances in towns and cities, under the direct authority of the mayor. They cannot be armed, even with non-lethal weapons, contrary to municipal police officers and rural guards. Today, there are roughly 8,000 surveillance of public road officers;
- The Coastal Protection Agency (Conservatoire du Littoral) is a public organisation in charge of the protection of outstanding littoral areas and thus, the fight against environment degradation and poaching on coastal areas. Its officers are employed and paid by local communities but working with the uniform of their agency. The strength of the Coastal protection agency is roughly 1,000 coastline officers;
- The French Nature Reserves (Réserves naturelles de France or RNF) is a public organisation in charge of the protection of areas classified nature reserves and thus, the fight against environment degradation. Its officiers are employed and paid by local communities but working with the uniform of their agency. They can only bear non-lethal weapons, contrary to their counterparts of the Coastal Protection Agency. There are less than 1,000 nature reserves officers today in France.
- The Louveterie (lit. 'Wolf-catching agency') is one of the oldest law enforcement forces, dating back to 813 AD when it was founded by Charlemagne. Its officers are independent of each other. Even though their main tasks are the fight against pest and large predators, when it is needed, and the surveillance of driven hunts, they also have law enforcement tasks, such as the fight against poaching and the control of hunting licenses. There are today nearly 2,000 wolfcatchers across the French territory;
- The private guards (gardes particuliers), despite their denomination, are sworn officers, which can be employed by the local Certified Association for Fishing and Protection of Aquatic Environments (Association agréée de pêche et de protection des milieux aquatiques or AAPPMA), the local Departmental Federation of Hunters (Fédération départementale des Chasseurs or FDC) or by the municipalities, in natural areas that are under their direct management. They can be employed by strictly private organisations and land owners to work on private properties, but are not regarded as being part of the law enforcement forces in such a case. They are armed officers, allowed to conduct their activities by the prefect and are placed under the authority of the public prosecutor. Their main tasks regarding law enforcement are the fight against poaching and environment degradation and the control of hunting licenses, although their powers are far more limited than those of the rural guards and of the officers of the French Office for Biodiversity, the National Forests Office, the municipal polices and the Coastal Protection Agency. Some of them are affiliated with the National Federation of Private Guards, but this is not mandatory. There are more than 50,000 private guards in France;
- The military personnel of the Armed Forces in Guiana (Forces armées en Guyane), mainly the military of the Army (Armée de Terre), are participating in law enforcement tasks, such as the protection of the Guiana Space Centre and the fight against illegal gold mining. There are roughly 2,000 military in these forces;
- The Territorial Guard of Wallis and Futuna (Garde territoriale de Wallis-et-Futuna) is the local equivalent of a non-armed municipal police force, under the command of the prefect. Its strength is roughly 20 territorial guards.

=== Police and gendarmerie ===
The leadership of both agencies is centralized and they both have conventional deviance control responsibilities respectively except in different geographical locations in France. The Police Nationale is responsible for Paris and other urban areas whereas the gendarmerie is responsible for small towns and rural areas with fewer than 20,000 inhabitants. The existence of two national police forces with similar goals and attributions, but somewhat different zones of activity, has at times created friction or competition between the two. Their merging has sometimes been suggested.

With the development of suburban dwellings, this had increasingly proved inadequate. Furthermore, the shifting of a town from a police to a gendarmerie zone was often controversial, because, typically, a gendarmerie unit serves a wide area.

A redistribution of authority was thus decided and implemented between 2003 and 2005. Large conurbations are now handled entirely by the police. Rural and suburban areas, and some smaller cities with populations ranging from 5,000 to 16,000, are handled by the gendarmerie.

In addition, the police and the gendarmerie have specific zones of authority:

- the police handle questions about the admittance, monitoring and continuing stay of foreigners (border police);
- the gendarmerie handle all matters regarding the military, the police at sea, the security of airports, and the security of certain public buildings (Republican Guard).

=== French police jurisdictions ===
In French, the term police not only refers to the forces, but also to the general concept of "maintenance of law and order" (policing).

There are two types of police in this general sense:

- administrative police (police administrative), upholding public order, safety checks and traffic controls, assistance to people in imminent danger, protection duties, etc.
- judicial police (police judiciaire), handling penal law enforcement and investigation of crimes and felonies under the authority of a Magistrate (Procureur de la République) in every case.

Also, the mayor (le maire) has administrative police power in a commune (municipality), which means that the mayor can order the police to enforce municipal bylaws.

A judge has police power in his courtroom (i.e. the judge can order people who disrupt the trial to be expelled from the proceedings).

Until 1984, the National Police were involved in prehospital rescue operations and casualty transport (called police-secours). Prehospital aid is now performed by fire services; however, mountain rescue is shared between the gendarmerie's PGHM (pelotons de gendarmerie de haute montagne, High Mountain Platoons of the Gendarmerie) and the National Police's CRS (compagnies républicaines de sécurité; Republican [national] security companies).

Many other countries have followed the French model and have established separate police agencies with the same role but different jurisdictions.

A local precinct of the "police nationale" (called commissariat) or the "gendarmerie nationale" (called brigade) may not be capable of conducting complex investigations. For this reason, both the police and the gendarmerie maintain regional services dedicated to criminal investigations (police judiciaire); these are known as "regional services of judiciary police" (Services régionaux de la Police judiciaire) in the police, "research sections" (Sections de recherche de la Gendarmerie nationale) in the gendarmerie. In addition, both the police and the gendarmerie maintain laboratories dedicated to forensics. The forensics service of the police is called Police technique et scientifique (Technical and Scientific Police). It is the equivalent of the American CSI Units.

Most criminal enquiries are conducted by the police. Justice may choose either service; sometimes, if the judiciary is disappointed by the results or the methods of one service, it may give the enquiry to the other service.

The National Police also features some central offices with national jurisdiction, charged with specific missions, such as the national anti-terrorist division.

Both the police and the gendarmerie have police tactical units. The gendarmerie has the foremost and best-known, the GIGN; the police have the RAID and the BRI groups. The gendarmerie also has armoured and paratroop squadrons.

Both the police and the gendarmerie have crowd and riot control forces: the CRS (Compagnies Républicaines de Sécurité) for the police, the gendarmerie mobile for the gendarmerie. They intervene throughout the country.

One reason for giving commission to a military force to handle matters of civilian police is that the military is not allowed to go on strike, contrary to civilian public servants such as the police personnel, which enables the government to always have an instrument of law enforcement at hand.

Another advantage of the gendarmerie is that, being career soldiers, they have the authority to use armed force in a much less restricted way than the police (in popular culture so-called licence to kill).

The gendarmes have free housing facilities inside their respective gendarmerie brigades (precincts) or live in barracks (casernes), which is not the case for the police.

== Functions ==
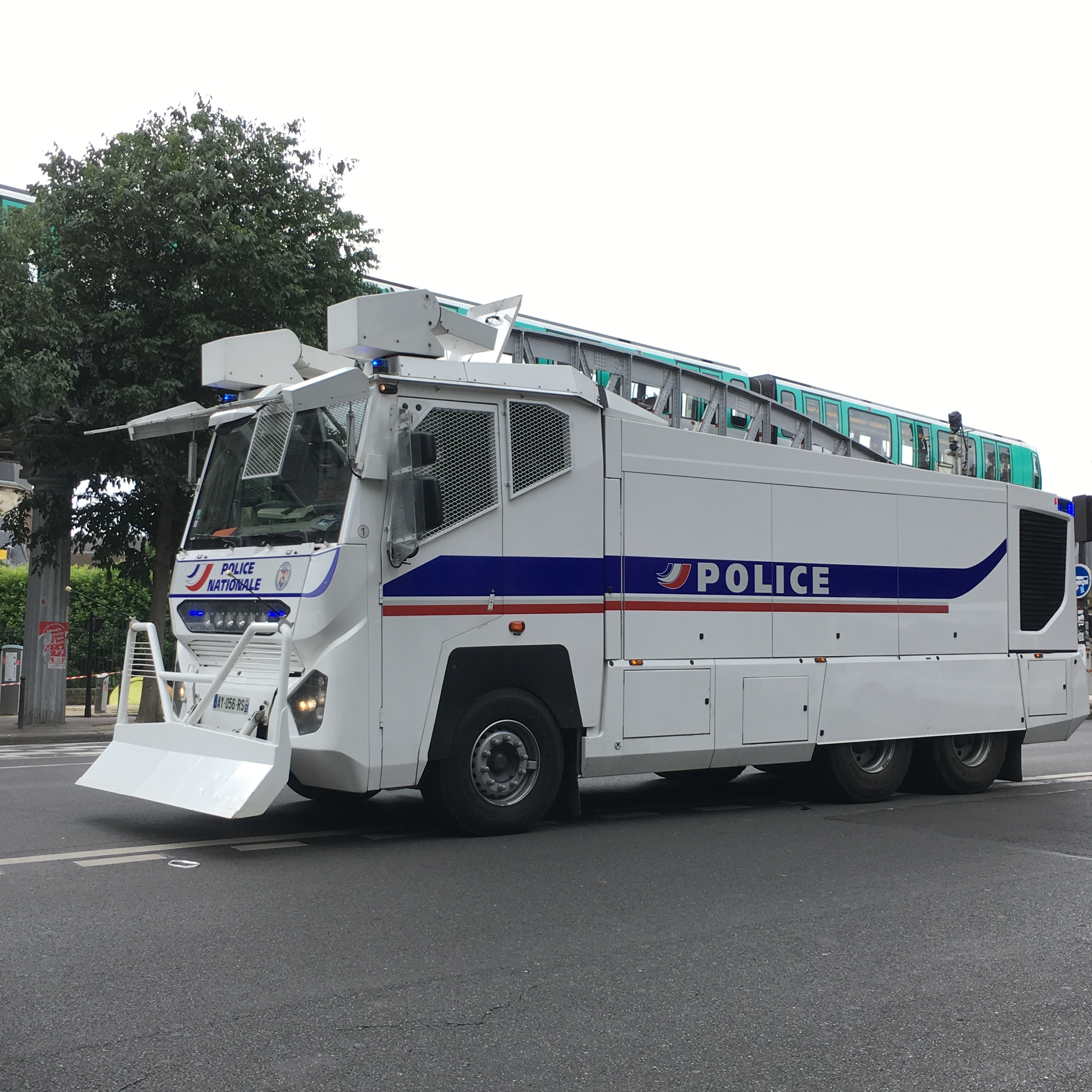
A water cannon of the French National Police

=== Administrative police ===
The Administrative police (French: police administrative) ensure the maintenance of public order and prevent crime, and are not involved the search for, or arrest of perpetrators of a particular offense.

It comprises a variety of actions undertaken under the direction and supervision of the executive branch, notably the prefect, police and gendarmerie forces conduct a variety of actions ensuring public order. They include:

- directing road traffic
- channelling street demonstrations
- positioning riot control forces (CRS or mobile gendarmerie)

=== Judicial police ===
The Judicial police (police judiciaire) is responsible for investigating, prosecuting, and punishing perpetrators of criminal offenses. Responsibilities include:

- pursuing and arresting suspects
- interrogating suspects in some phases of judicial enquiries
- gathering evidence
- serving search warrants

These actions must follow the rules given in the French code of criminal procedure, articles 12 to 29.

In order to better fulfill these missions, the Direction Centrale de la Police Judiciaire of the French National Police regroups all the units specialized in criminal enquiries. The gendarmerie counterpart are the sections de recherche (research sections).

== Rights and limitations ==
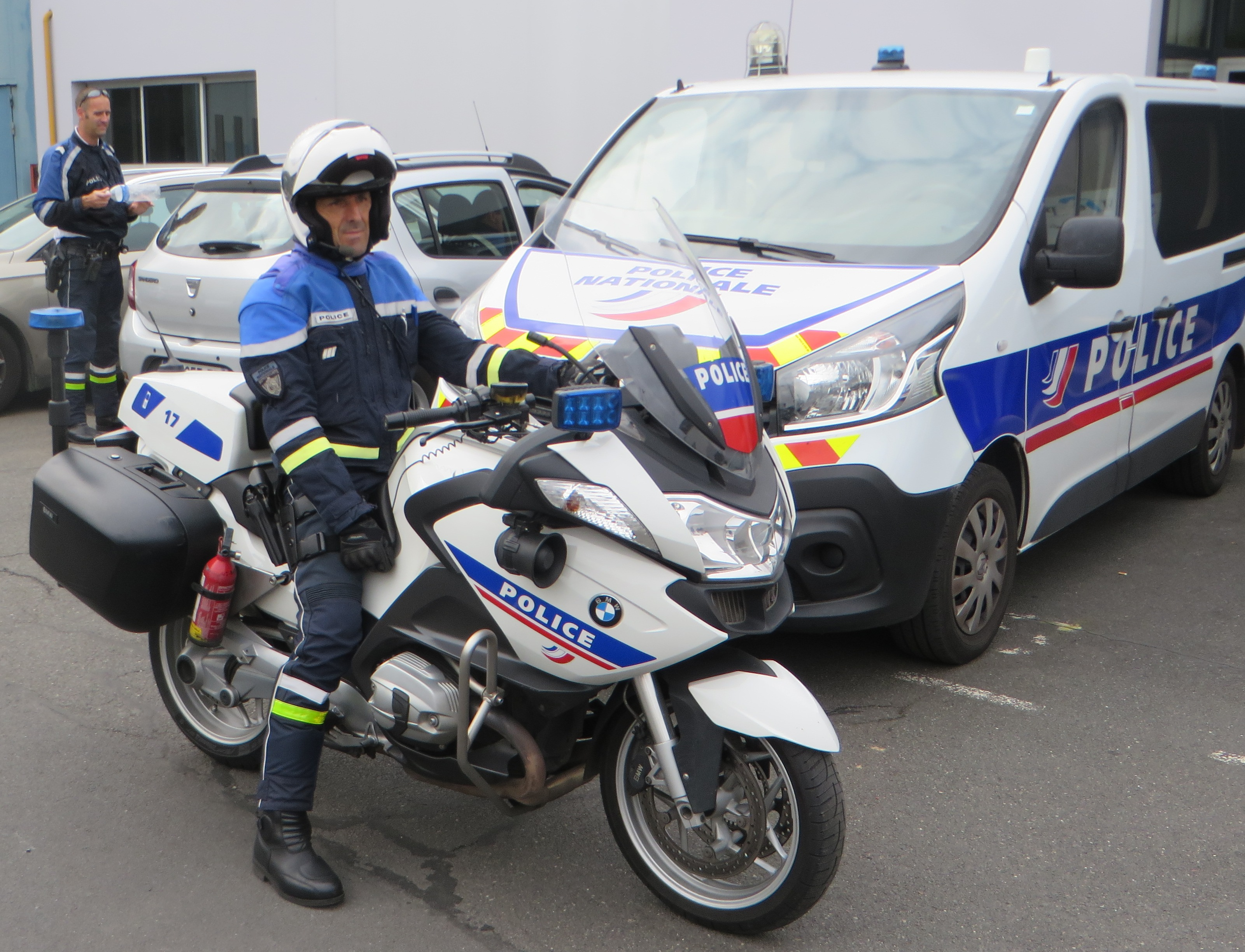
French motorcycle officer

The powers of French police and gendarmerie forces are constrained by statute law. The rules of procedure depend on the stage of enquiry:

- Crimes committed in flagrante delicto, in which a suspect was found committing the crime, or pursued by witnesses, or found in possession of objects from the crime or other probable cause.
- Preliminary enquiries: it is unclear whether a crime, or which crime, has been committed, but there exist good reasons to believe this might be the case.
- Judicial information: an investigative magistrate (a judge, external to the police) supervises an inquiry on a case where it is certain, or at least very probable, that a crime has been committed.

In particular, except for crimes in flagrante delicto, law enforcement forces may not conduct searches or arrests without a specific commission from the investigative magistrate. Depending on legal status of cases, not all law enforcement officers are able to act; some powers are restricted to those with special legal qualifications (see next section).

== Officers and agents of judicial police ==
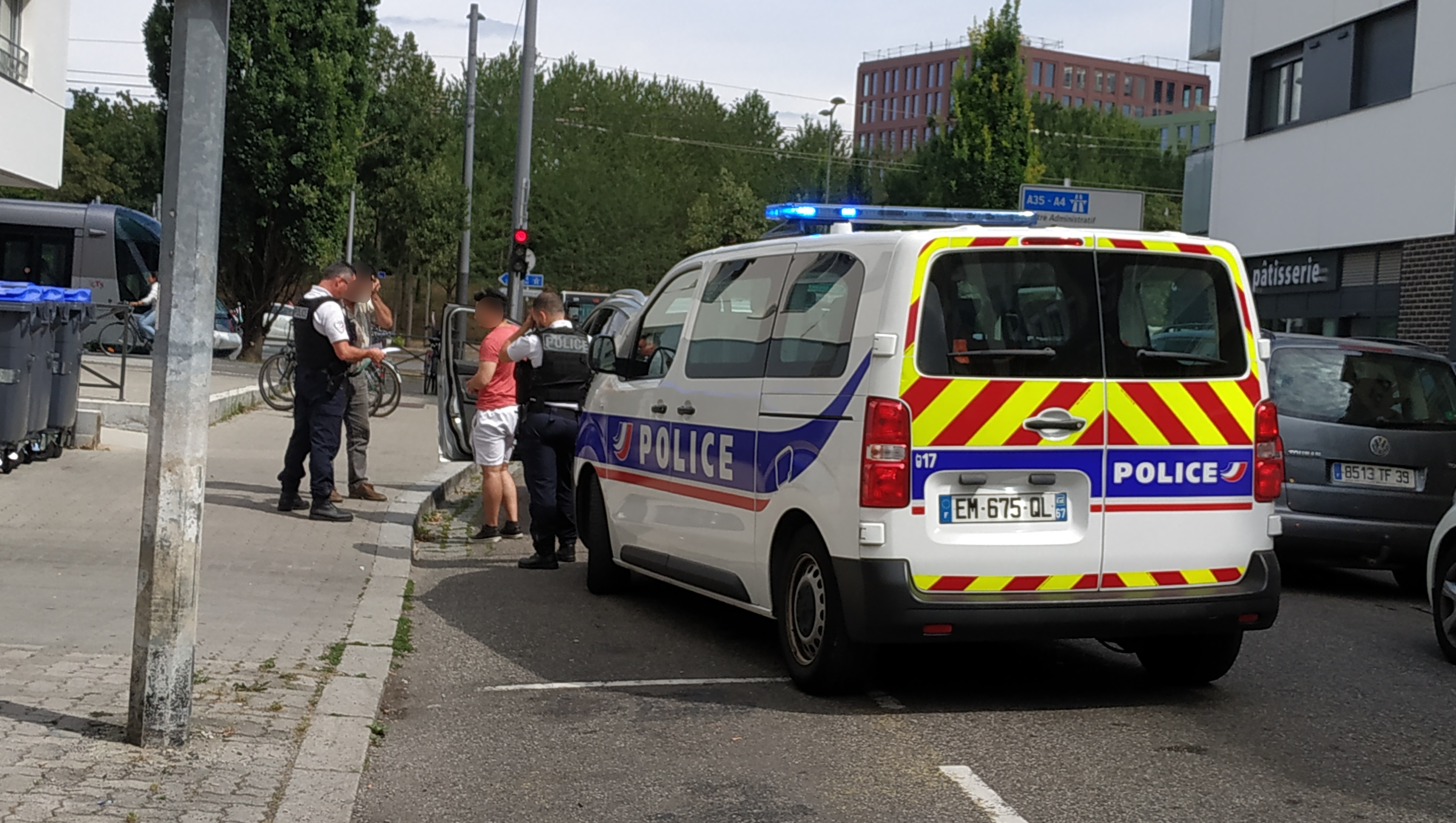
Officers stopping a car

The procedures that police and gendarmerie officers follow when conducting criminal inquiries are set by the French code of criminal procedure (Code de procédure pénale) and applicable jurisprudence. Criminal inquiries are conducted under the supervision of the judiciary (depending on the phase, under the supervision of the public prosecutor or of an investigative judge).

There are three judiciary qualifications: "officer of judicial police" (officier de police judiciaire or OPJ), "agent of judicial police" (agent de police judiciaire or APJ) and "agent of judicial police assistant" (APJ adjoint). The qualifications of OPJ and APJ can only be exercised if they are affected to a position where these are needed, and, for the OPJs by nominal decision of the general prosecutor of their area. These prerogatives are temporarily suspended when they engage, in an organized force, in an operation of public order (i.e. riot control).

- Mayors and deputy mayors are OPJs. This disposition is rarely used.
- In the National Police, these are qualified as OPJs:
  - the commissioners and above ranks;
  - the titular members of the corps de commandement nominally listed in a joint decision by the ministers of justice and of the interior;
  - members of the Corps d'encadrement et d'application who have completed three years of service, and are nominally listed in a joint decision by the ministers of justice and of the interior.
- In the National Gendarmerie, these are qualified as OPJs:
  - commissioned officers
  - non-commissioned officers having completed three years of service, nominally designated by a joint decision by the ministers of justice and of defense.

These ministerial nomination decisions may only be taken after the approval of a specific commission. The current rules also warrant the completion of an examination pertaining to legal matters.

Most other members of the National Police and gendarmerie are APJs. The remaining members of the National Police, as well as members of municipal police forces, are APJ assistants.

Only OPJs may serve search (this includes anybody search more invasive than external palpation) and put somebody in custody ("garde à vue") for 24 hours; APJs may only assist them in these tasks. Suspects apprehended by an APJ must be brought before an OPJ which will in turn have to inform the public prosecutor. According to the law, any citizen can apprehend the author of a crime or of an offense that can be punished by a prison sentence (citizen's arrest) and lead them to an OPJ. However, this is problematic in case of a "simple" citizen due to the estimation of what can be punished by a prison sentence or not, and due to possible abuse (abuses are a restriction of individual freedom and can be sued for illegal confinement).

The quality of officer of judiciary police may be withdrawn by the judiciary if the officer has behaved in an inappropriate fashion. The general prosecutor grades OPJs and these grades are taken into account for possible promotions.

== Summary table of the French law enforcement agencies ==
| Agency | Bearing of lethal weapons by officers | Right of way in traffic | Ministry | Logo |
|---|---|---|---|---|
| Armed Forces in Guiana | ✔ | ✘ | Ministry of Armed Forces | |
| Coastal Protection Agency | ✔ | ✘ | Ministry of Ecological Transition | |
| Directorate general for Maritime affairs, Fisheries and Aquaculture | ✔ | ✘ (except at sea) | Secretary of State for the Sea, Ministry of Ecological Transition and Ministry of Agriculture | / |
| Directorate-General of Customs and Indirect Taxes | ✔ | ✔ | Ministry of Economics and Finance | |
| French Nature Reserves | ✘ | ✘ | / | |
| French Office for Biodiversity | ✔ | ✘ | Ministry of Ecological Transition and Ministry of Agriculture | |
| General Directorate for Internal Security | ✔ | ✘ | Ministry of the Interior | |
| Judicial tax officers of the Directorate-General of Public Finances | ✔ | ✘ | Ministry of Economics and Finance and Ministry of the Interior | |
| Louveterie | ✔ | ✘ | / | |
| Metropolitan Support and Assistance Ships of the Navy | ✔ | ✘ | Ministry of Armed Forces | |
| Military personnel engaged in Opération Sentinelle | ✔ | ✘ | Ministry of Armed Forces | |
| Municipal Police | ✔/✘ (depends on the area) | ✔ | / | |
| National Forests Office | ✔ | ✘ | Ministry of Agriculture and Ministry of Ecological Transition | |
| National Gendarmerie | ✔ | ✔ | Ministry of the Interior and Ministry of Armed Forces | |
| National Police | ✔ | ✔ | Ministry of the Interior | |
| Network Protection and Safety Group (RATP Group) | ✔ | ✔ | / | |
| Private Guards of fishing and hunting federations | ✔/✘ (depends on the area) | ✘ | / | / |
| Public Roads Surveillance Officers | ✘ | ✘ | / | |
| Prison Administration | ✘ (except when transferring prisoners or when restoring order during prison riots) | ✔ | Ministry of Justice | |
| Railway Security Agency (SNCF) | ✔ | ✔ | / | |
| Rural Guards | ✔/✘ (depends on the area) | ✘ | / | |
| Support and Protection Group (RTM Group) | ✘ | ✘ | / | / |
| Territorial Guard of Wallis and Futuna | ✘ | ✔ | / | / |

== See also ==
- Crime in France
- Groupe mobile de réserve, paramilitary police unit of Vichy France
- Judiciary of France
- Police violence in France
- Brigades nautiques et fluviales
