= Commander-in-Chief, Mediterranean (France) =

Senior French Navy commander

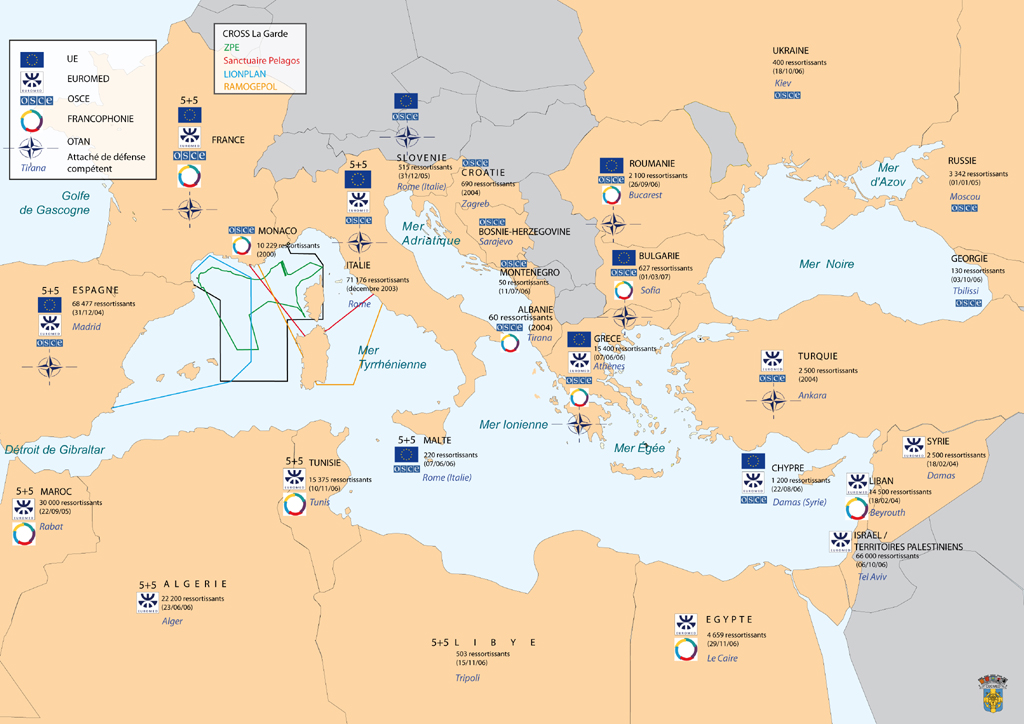
Mediterranean Sea Area under the command of CECMED with the agreements and associations of France with the riparian countries and the number of French nationals in these countries.

The French Commander-in-Chief, Mediterranean, also known as CECMED (French for Commandant en chef pour la Méditerranée), is a French Armed Forces regional commander. The officeholder, who commands the Mediterranean zone, region, and maritime arrondissement, is usually an admiral of the French Navy, under the direct authority of the French Chief of the Defence Staff. As of 2015 the position was held by Admiral Yann Tainguy.

CECMED today is simultaneously:

- Commander of the region and the Mediterranean maritime arrondissement,
- Maritime zone commander,
- Maritime prefect for the Mediterranean.

Today the main French naval combat force in the Mediterranean is the Force d'action navale (FAN) headquartered at Toulon. The admiral commanding the Naval Action Force (ALFAN) is responsible to the Chief of Staff of the French Navy formerly at Rue Royale in Paris.

== History ==
=== Mediterranean Squadron ===
Vice-amiral François Fournier was Commander-in-Chief, Mediterranean Squadron (Commandant en chef l'Escadre de Méditerranée, fr:Escadre de la Méditerranée) in January 1899 aboard Galilée.

On 20 July 1921 after a series of designation changes, the force again became the Mediterranean Squadron. It became the 1st Squadron on 1 January 1927; the Mediterranean Squadron on 30 October 1936; and the Mediterranean Fleet on 1 July 1939. On the outbreak of war the fleet consisted of the 2nd Squadron (Vice Amiral d'Escadre Emmanuel Ollive) at Toulon, with three older battleships (including Bretagne and Provence) and their fleet torpedo boat escorts; the 3rd Squadron of two divisions of 10,000-ton cruisers (Algerie, Dupleix, Foch in 1e DC) and three divisions of contretorpilleurs, also at Toulon, and the 4th Squadron at Bizerte with a light cruiser division and three divisions of contretorpilleurs, under Rear Admiral André Marquis.

In September 1939 the fleet included:

- 2ème Escadre (VAE Ollive) : Provence (VAE Ollive - CV Barois)
  - 2ème DL : Lorraine * (CA Vallée - CV Aurin) - Bretagne (CV Seguin)
  - 1ère FT (CV Longaud) :
    - 1ère DT : La Palme ° (CV Longaud) - Le Mars (CC Lamote) –Tempête (CC Pellegrin)
    - 3ème DT : Le Fortuné ° (CC d’Hespel)– La Railleuse (CC Hourcade) – Simoun (CC Hainguerlot)
    - 7ème DT : Tramontane ° (CF Renault) - Typhon (CC Le Hagre) – Tornade (CC Labat)
- 3ème Escadre (VA Duplat) :-
  - 1ère Division de Croiseurs: Algérie *** (VA Duplat - CV Nouvel de la Flèche) - Dupleix (CV Hameury) – Foch (CV Mathieu) - Colbert (ship list as of 1 July 1939)
  - 2ème DC : Duquesne ** (CA Kerdudo – CV Husson) – Tourville (CV Marloy)
  - 3ème EL (CA Derrien) :
    - 5ème DCT : Tartu ° (CV Chomel) - Chevalier Paul (CF Bonnot) – Vauquelin (CF Jaujard)
    - 7ème DCT : Vautour ° (CF Reboul Hector Berlioz) - Gerfaut (CF Penet) – Albatros (CF Penet)
    - 9ème DCT : Maillé Brézé ** (CA Derrien) - CF Glotin) - Cassard (CF Braxmeyer) – Kersaint (CF Rebuffel)
- 4ème Escadre (CA Marquis) :
  - 3ème DC : Marseillaise ** (CA Marquis – CV Hamon) - Jean de Vienne (CV Missoffe) – La Galissonniere (CV Dupré)
  - Non endivisionné : Emile Bertin (CV Battet)

The twentieth century history of the French Navy in the Mediterranean includes surveillance of actions during the Spanish Civil War. On 14 June 1940, the 3rd Escadre executed Operation Samoyède. The squadron, including the cruisers Foch, Algérie, Dupleix and Colbert, bombarded Genoa, supported by French Naval Aviation.

In 1940, after the fall of France, the Royal Navy launched the attack on Mers-el-Kébir which disabled most of the French surface fleet in 1940 to prevent it from falling into German hands. In 1942 the scuttling of the French fleet in Toulon took place for the same reason. The Navy also protected troop convoys from French Algeria to France in both World Wars, and played a peripheral role in the Algerian War from 1954 to 1962. In 1956 the French Navy joined forces the Royal Navy to take control of the Suez Canal in Egypt during the Suez Crisis. In 1964, the cruiser Colbert became flagship of the Mediterranean squadron. The regional Mediterranean and Atlantic flotillas (Amiral commandant l'escadre de la Méditerranée, ALESCMED, and Atlantic equivalent ALESCLANT), were replaced by ALFAN (the Naval Action Force) and Admiral, Antisubmarine Group (ALGASM) as part of Optimar '95, the post-Cold War restructuring process.

=== Mediterranean naval forces within the Force d'action navale ===
In the 2020s, French naval forces in the Mediterranean are one element within the Force d'action navale of the French Navy. The force d'action navale is composed of ships based both in the Mediterranean and the Atlantic. However, as of 2022 the majority of the fleet's major combatants are based in the Mediterranean, including:

- Six nuclear-powered attack submarines of the Rubis and Barracuda classes
- The aircraft carrier Charles de Gaulle;
- Three Mistral-class amphibious assault ships;
- Two Horizon-class air defence frigates;
- Four Aquitaine-class frigates; and,
- Five La Fayette-class frigates.
