= Maritime prefect =

Prefect in charge of a French maritime arrondissement

A maritime prefect (French: Préfet maritime) is a servant of the French government who exercises authority over the sea in a particular region known as a maritime prefecture (Préfecture maritime). As of 2025, there are three maritime prefects in metropolitan France, based in Cherbourg-en-Cotentin (Channel and North Sea), Brest (Atlantic Ocean) and Toulon (Mediterranean Sea).

== History ==
The dignity was created on 27 April 1800 under the French Consulate to unify the command of harbours (civil administrator) and the command of the Navy (admiral). Two additional maritime prefects were based in Rochefort until 1927 and Lorient until 1941.

Maritime prefectures exist in each of the five overseas departments of France, but are administered by the departments' respective prefects: Cayenne for French Guiana, Basse-Terre for Guadeloupe, Fort-de-France for Martinique, Saint-Denis for Réunion and Mamoudzou for Mayotte.

== Duties and responsibilities ==
The prefect maritime is the representative of the State at sea, government delegate and direct representative of the Prime Minister and each of the ministers. It is vested with "authority in all areas where State action is exercised at sea".

The maritime prefect has general police powers and oversees the defense of sovereign rights and the interests of the Nation, the maintenance of public order, the safeguarding of persons and property, the protection environment and the coordination of the fight against illicit activities.

The maritime prefect is a flag officer in the French Navy, who combines this civil function with the military powers of "commander of the maritime zone" (operational control of the forces deployed in the maritime zone) and "commander of the maritime district" (commands naval units not under another command).

== List of maritime prefects ==
As of 2019, the three maritime prefects in metropolitan France are:

- Channel and North Sea (Cherbourg-en-Cotentin): Vice-amiral Philippe Dutrieux, following the 1924 unification of the commanding position at Dunkirk and prefecture at Cherbourg (COMNORD)
- Atlantic Ocean (Château de Brest, Brest): Vice-amiral d'escadre Olivier Lebas, ex-officio holds the title of Commander for the Atlantic (Commandant en chef pour l'Atlantique, CECLANT)
- Mediterranean Sea (Toulon): Vice-amiral d'escadre Gilles Boidevezi, ex-officio holds the title of Commander for the Mediterranean (Commandant en chef pour la Méditerranée, CECMED)
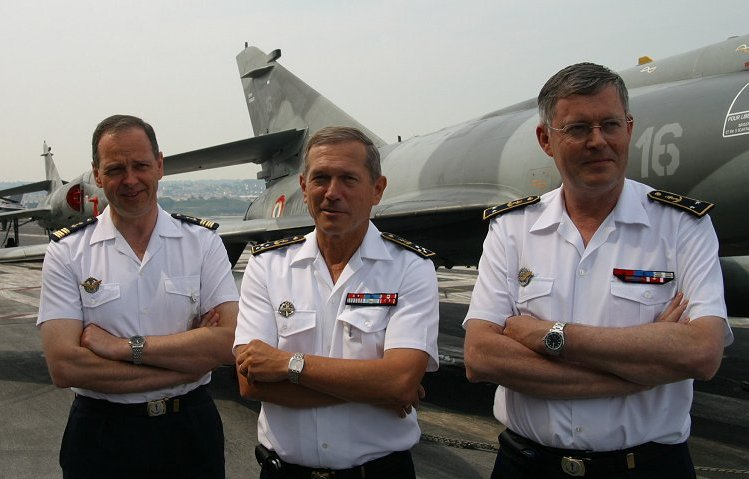
From left to right: Capitaine de Vaisseau Xavier Magne (captain of the Charles De Gaulle), vice-amiral d'escadre Alain Dumontet, commander of the Force d'Action Navale, and contre-amiral Édouard Guillaud, Préfet maritime of the English Channel and North Sea (former captain of the Charles De Gaulle 1999–2001).

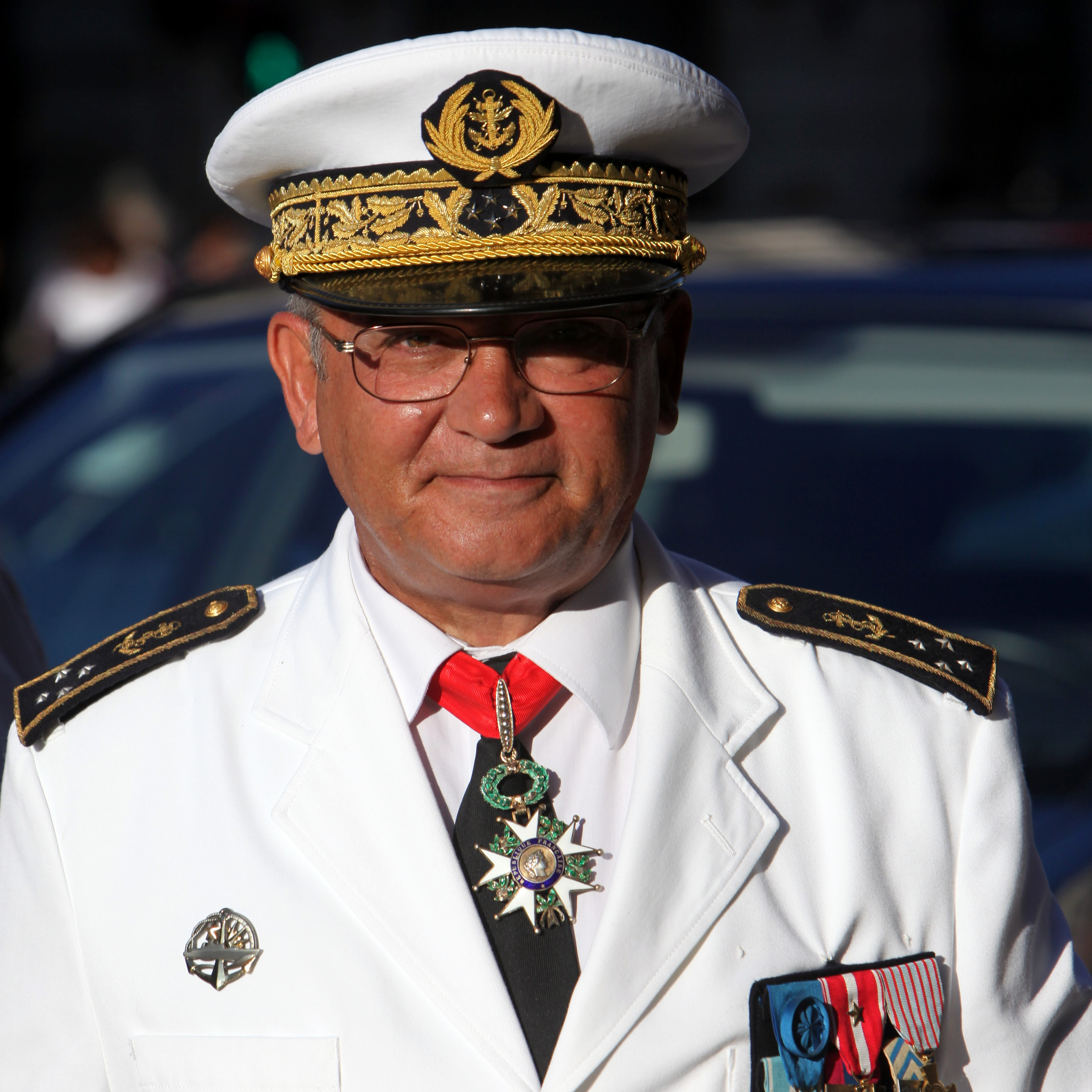
Admiral Yann Tainguy, Maritime prefect for the Mediterranean

== See also ==
- Directorate general for Maritime affairs, Fisheries and Aquaculture
- Maritime Gendarmerie
- Coastguard Service of the French Customs
- Société Nationale de Sauvetage en Mer
