= Coast Guard Function (France) =

The French Coast Guard Function (fonction garde-côtes) is not an government agency, but an interministerial coordination mechanism placed under the authority of the Prime Minister of France and managed by the Secrétariat général de la Mer.

== Participating Agencies ==
The function relies on the pooling of resources from several agencies:

1. The French Navy: Maritime defense, sovereignty, and the high seas.
2. The Maritime Gendarmerie: General law enforcement at sea and criminal investigations.
3. The Coastguard Service of the French Customs, responsible for combating illicit trafficking, tax control, and monitoring EU maritime borders.
4. Directorate general for Maritime affairs, Fisheries and Aquaculture: Fisheries control, vessel safety, and environmental protection.
5. The Border Police: Combat illegal immigration and regulate foreign nationals' entry.
6. Sécurité Civile and the Société Nationale de Sauvetage en Mer (voluntary association): Search, rescue, and salvage at sea.

== Main Missions ==
The missions of the coast guard function cover three main operational pillars:

1. Maritime safety and rescue: Search and rescue of persons in distress. Assistance to vessels in difficulty.
2. Public safety and order (maritime police). Combating drug trafficking, smuggling, and illegal immigration. Maritime policing and surveillance of maritime approaches.
3. Environmental and resource protection: Combating marine pollution (such as oil spills or discharges). Fisheries enforcement to combat illegal fishing.

== Operational Center ==
The Operational Center for the Coast Guard Function coordinates the operations of the coast guard function. Established in 2010, this interministerial center provides 24/7 monitoring. It establishes the reference maritime situation to inform the government in real time and coordinate the management of major crises at sea.
