= Vedette côtière de surveillance maritime =

French military police

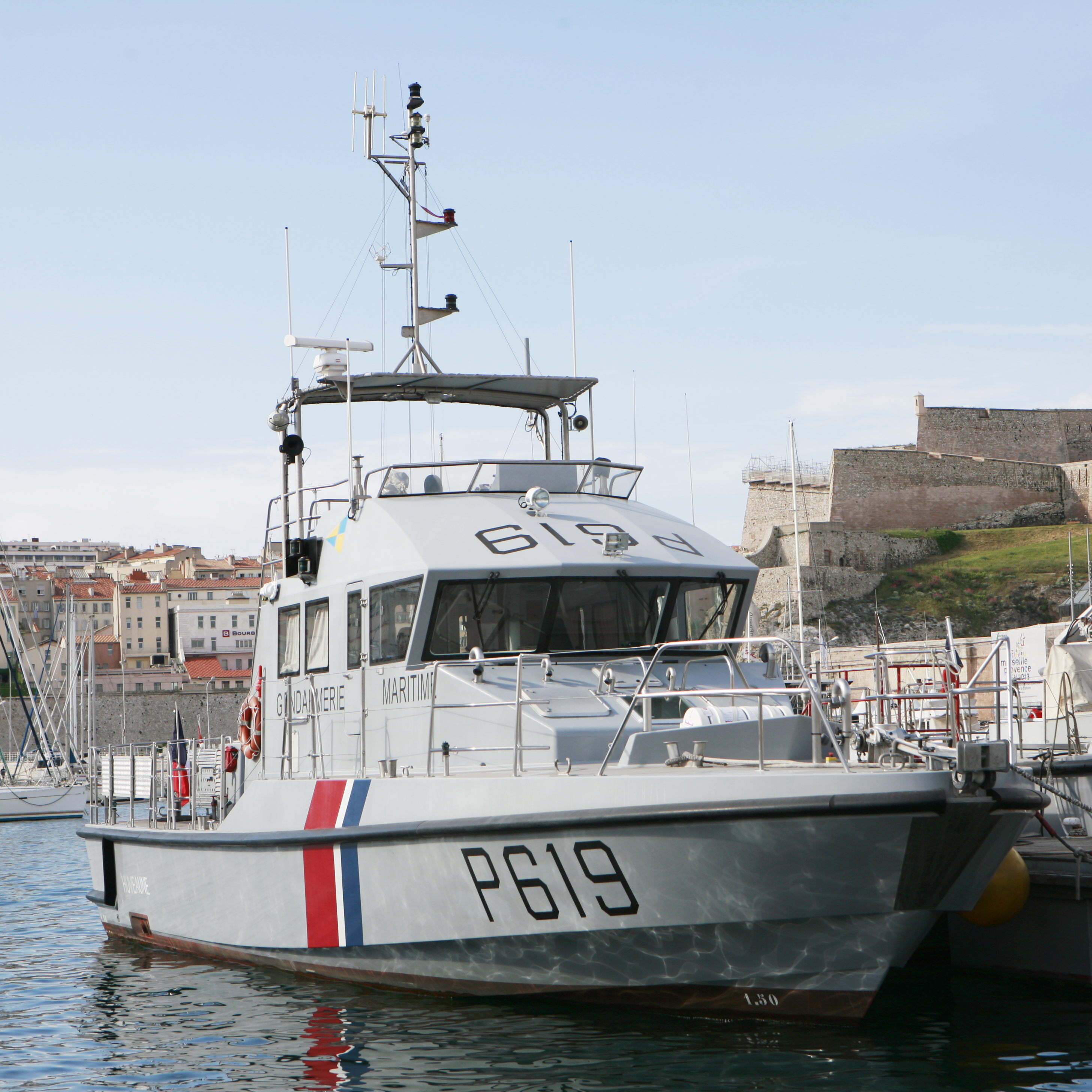
- Patrol boat Huveaune in the old harbour of Marseille.

Class overview
- Name: Vedette côtière de surveillance maritime
- Operators: France (Gendarmerie maritime); Senegal (customs); Moroccan Navy; South African Police Service
- Subclasses: RPB 20 for export
- In commission: 11 June 2003
- Completed: 30
- Laid up: 1
- Lost: 2 (reportedly destroyed in Mayotte by Cyclone Chido in December 2024)

General characteristics
- Type: Swift boat
- Displacement: 31 to 41 t (31 to 40 long tons)
- Length: 20 m (65 ft 7 in)
- Beam: 5.29 m (17 ft 4 in)
- Draught: 2.89 m (9 ft 6 in)
- Speed: 25 knots (46 km/h; 29 mph)
- Range: 500 nmi (930 km; 580 mi)
- Endurance: 4 days
- Complement: 8
- Sensors & processing systems: Radar
- Armament: Light infantry weapons, FM AANF1

The Vedettes côtières de surveillance maritime (VCSM, "coastal boats for sea surveillance") are swift craft of the French Gendarmerie maritime. 24 boats of the type have been commissioned. They are based in various harbours of France, and are used for coast guard duties ranging from rescue to military tasks, including monitoring of pollution, sea police, and interception of illegal immigrants and drug traffickers.

The VCSM carry a custom-designed rigid-hull tender in a well deck. This deck can be converted into a helicopter airlift zone.

The boats do not carry heavy armament, but light machine guns can be installed when needed. In addition, infantry small arms are carried by the crew.

== Ships in Gendarmerie maritime service ==
The ships in Gendarmerie maritime service are named for rivers of the harbours in which they were initially based.

These ships include:

- P601 Élorn (Concarneau)
- P602 Verdon (deployed in Mayotte as of early 2023; reportedly damaged "beyond repair" by Cyclone Chido in December 2024)
- P603 Adour (originally in Anglet; transferred to Mayotte in early 2025 to replace Odet and Verdon)
- P604 Scarpe (Boulogne-sur-Mer)
- P605 Vertonne (Sables d'Olonne)
- P606 Dumbea (Nouméa)
- P607 Yser (Dieppe)
- P608 Argens (Saint Raphaël)
- P609 Hérault (Sète)
- P610 Gravona (Ajaccio)
- P611 Odet (Mayotte; reportedly damaged "beyond repair" by Cyclone Chido in December 2024)
- P612 Maury (Gruissan)
- P613 Charente (Rochefort, transferred to Cayenne in 2022 replacing Mahury)
- P614 Tech (Port Vendres)
- P615 Penfeld (Brest)
- P616 Trieux (Saint Malo)
- P617 Vésubie (Nice)
- P618 Escaut (Dunkerque)
- P619 Huveaune (Marseille)
- P620 Sèvre (Pornichet)
- P621 Aber-Wrach (Brest)
- P622 Esteron (Le Havre)
- P623 Mahury (Cayenne, unserviceable as of 2022)
- P624 Organabo (Kourou)

== Replacement ==
In 2025, the Armaments Directorate General initiated a process to replace the Élorn-class with new vessels that are to have a length of about 22 metres, a minimum speed of 22 knots in sea state 4 and have endurance for about 3 days. In 2026 it was announced that Couach shipyard in Gironde fo 24 new boats to be named the "Musketeer" class. Delivery was expected from 2029.
