= Établissement national des invalides de la marine =

Établissement national des invalides de la marine (ENIM) (National Establishment for Marine Invalids) is a national public institution of France responsible for the special social security scheme for commercial, fishing, and yachting seamen.

== Mission ==
Created in 1930 as a government agency, the ENIM became in 2010 a public administrative establishment. It is placed under the supervision of the ministers responsible for the Sea, Social Security, and the Budget and under the oversight of the new Directorate general for Maritime affairs, Fisheries and Aquaculture.

ENIM manages the special social security scheme for sailors and seafarers in the merchant marine, fishing fleet, marine farming and boating, with regard to the risks of old age, death, accidents at work and occupational diseases, illness, maternity and invalidity. It also ensures the taxation and collection of contributions and social security contributions ensuring the special social security regime for seafarers.

ENIM insures around 40,000 active sailors and around 120,000 pensioners in mainland France and overseas, their dependents as well as high school and university students studying at maritime educational establishments.

== Organization ==
- President of the Board of Directors: Marie-Caroline Bonnet-Galzy, general inspector of social affairs (2021)
- Director: Malika Anger
- Sub-Directorate for Legal Affairs
- Sub-Directorate for Maritime Social Policies
- Sub-Directorate for Information Systems

Headquarters is in Périgny. ENIM is also present in Saint-Malo (Department of Maritime Social Health Policies, Department of Maritime Social Policies in support of employers and the career of seafarers, and the Collection, Abuse, Fault and Fraud department (DRAFF); in Lorient (Department of Maritime Health Social Policies, Department of Maritime Social Policies of Health and Social Action and Prevention, and the Sub-Directorate for Information Systems; as well as in Paimpol (Department of Maritime Social Pension Policies).

== Personnel ==
The ENIM has a personnel cadre of 330 employees spread over the four geographical sites.
