= Secrétariat général de la Mer =

French gov't agency for sea policy

General Secretariat for the Sea
- Secrétariat général de la Mer

Agency overview
- Formed: 1995; 31 years ago
- Jurisdiction: France
- Agency executives: Didier Lallement, secretary general; Benoît de Guibert, deputy secretary general
- Parent department: Office of the Prime Minister of France
- Website: https://www.gouvernement.fr/secretariat-general-de-la-mer-sgmer

The General Secretariat for the Sea (French: Secrétariat général de la Mer, abbreviated SGMer) is a French government agency attached to the Prime Minister of France's Office.

The mission is to exercise control, evaluation and forecasting within the framework of France's public policies concerning the sea and the littoral. It also leads and coordinates the action of the maritime prefects.

== Creation ==
The General Secretatiat for the Sea was created in 1995 and is attached to the office of Prime Minister of France.

== Mission ==
The mission of the General Secretatiat is to exercise control, evaluation and forecasting within the framework of public policies concerning the sea and the littoral and ensures that the decisions of the government of France are designed and implemented in close consultation with the ensemble of professionals concerned, in order to ensure harmonious development of the different maritime activities. In doing so, it coordinates the monitoring of legal texts relating to the sea and proposes the necessary adaptations concerning the evolution of international and European Union law. The General Secretariat leads and coordinates the action of the maritime prefects and overseas Government delegates for State action at sea.

== Organization ==
The Secretariat General is headed by a Secretary General of the Sea appointed by decree in the Council of Ministers, assisted by a Deputy Secretary General, a flag officer of the Navy. The Secretary General for the Sea is also assisted by three advisors for each of the major themes (state action at sea; maritime and port economy; Europe and the environment), themselves supported by thematic mission managers. These senior civil servants are seconded or made available to Secretariat General by several ministries or public establishments, guaranteeing the interministerial role of the Secretariat General and the plurality of its expertise.

- Secretary general: Didier Lallement, senior prefect
- Deputy secretary general: Benoît de Guibert, vice admiral
- Subordinate organisations:
  - Maritime Prefecture of the Atlantic
  - Maritime Prefecture of the Channel and the North Sea
  - Maritime Prefecture of the Mediterranean Sea
  - Operational Center of the Coast Guard Function
