= Maritime Gendarmerie =

Maritime branch of the French National Gendarmerie

Maritime Gendarmerie Gendarmerie maritime

Agency overview
- Formed: 1832 – present
- Employees: 1,157

Jurisdictional structure
- Operations jurisdiction: France
- General nature: Gendarmerie
- Specialist jurisdiction: Coastal patrol, marine border protection, marine search and rescue

Operational structure
- Parent agency: National Gendarmerie

The Maritime Gendarmerie (French: Gendarmerie maritime) is a component of the French National Gendarmerie under operational control of the chief of staff of the French Navy. It employs 1,157 personnel and operates around thirty patrol boats and high-speed motorboats distributed on the littoral waterways of France. Like their land-based colleagues the Gendarmes Maritime are military personnel who carry out policing operations in addition to their primary role as a coast guard service. They also carry out provost duties within the French Navy.

The uniforms and insignia of the Gendarmerie Maritime are very similar to those of the French Navy, but the ranks used are those of the rest of the Gendarmerie (which are the same as the traditional ranks of the French Cavalry).

== Mission ==
The mission of the Maritime Gendarmerie is as follows:

- Maritime safety and of general police force duties in the territorial waters and EEZ, under the authority of the maritime prefect.
- Criminal Investigation Department under the authority of public prosecutor.
- Protection of the naval shore establishments.
- Search and rescue.
- Participating agency in the Coast guard function

== Organisation ==
The Maritime Gendarmerie is commanded by a colonel who is assisted by a staff located in Paris. The coastguard is divided into 3 groupings, 7 companies and 64 units (brigades of research, brigades of monitoring of the littoral, group of safety of the protected zones, group of monitoring of intervention and reinforcement, patrol craft, coastal high-speed motorboats of maritime surveillance) whose geographical distribution is as follows:

- Metropolitan France :
  - grouping of the English Channel and the North Sea in Cherbourg (2 companies)
  - grouping of the Atlantic in Brest (4 companies);
  - grouping of the Mediterranean in Toulon (2 companies);
  - company from Paris to the Career-on-Seine (under the authority of the headquarters);
  - national instruction center of the GM (C.N.I.G.M) in Toulon.
- Overseas:
  - Guadeloupe: 1 patrol craft (Violette);
  - French Guiana: 2 high-speed 20-metre motorboats (Charente and Organabo);
  - Mayotte: 2 high-speed 20-metre patrol boats Verdon and Odet (replaced by Adour in early 2025 due to damage to both by Cyclone Chido in December 2024)
  - French Polynesia: 1 patrol craft (Jasmin) and a brigade;
  - New Caledonia: 1 high-speed motorboat of 20 meters (Dumbéa) and 2 brigades;

== Personnel ==
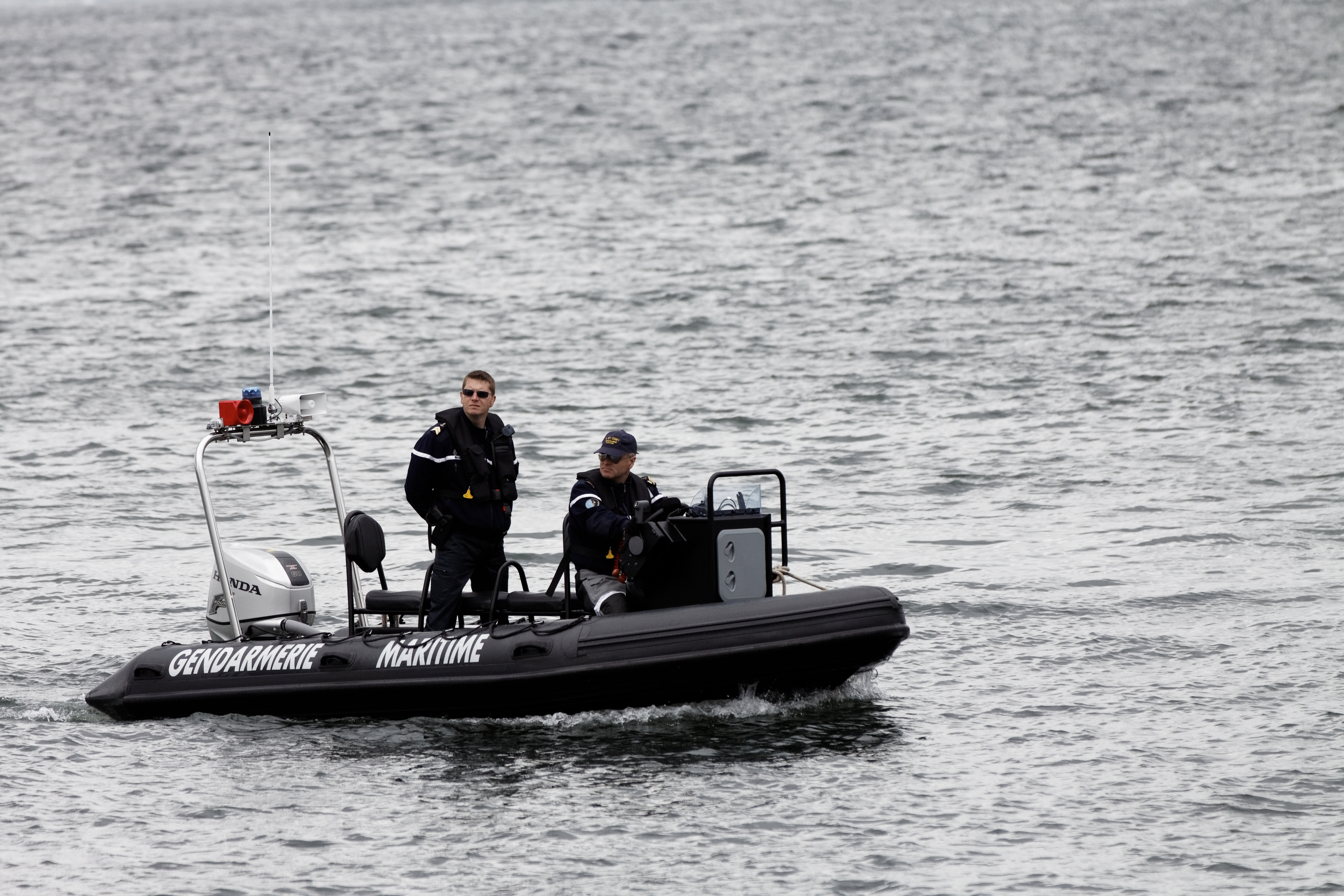
Two members of the Maritime Gendarmerie in a rubber boat.

Commissioned officers are recruited from holders of a master's degree; non-commissioned officers from holders of a high school diploma giving access to university studies; auxiliary gendarmes are recruited without any specific educational prerequisite. Members of the maritime gendarmerie are recruited among officers, nco's and auxiliary gendarmes with a few years of general gendarmerie service. Certificate of competency for sea or inland water navigation and training in scuba diving is a merit for those who wants to join. Within the maritime gendarmerie there exists further specializations such as coxswain, mechanic, diver, underwater investigation technician, maritime and port security operative and watch-keeping officer.

NATO code	OF-10	OF-9	OF-8	OF-7	OF-6	OF-5	OF-4	OF-3	OF-2	OF-1
Maritime Gendarmerie
Rank title					Général de brigade	Colonel	Lieutenant-Colonel	Chef d'Escadron	Capitaine	Lieutenant

NATO code	OR-9		OR-8	OR-7	OR-6	OR-5			OR-4	OR-3	OR-2	OR-1
Maritime Gendarmerie
Rank title	Major	Adjudant-chef	Adjudant		Maréchal des Logis-Chef	Gendarme	Élève Sous-officer	Gendarme Adjoint Maréchal-des-logis	Gendarme Adjoint brigadier-chef	Gendarme Adjoint brigadier	Gendarme Adjoint première classe	Gendarme Adjoint deuxième classe

== Patrol boats ==
Class	Picture	Type	Boat	Displacement	Note
PCG-NG class		Patrol boat	P727 Rozel; P728 Beuzeval	350 tonnes	P727 based in Cherbourg, joined by P-728 (temporarily assigned to the navy); up to four more vessels planned to replace Géranium and Jonquille classes between 2026 and 2029
Géranium class		Patrol boat	P719 Armoise; P720 Géranium; P722 Violette	100 tonnes	P719 based in Cherbourg is former Directorate for Maritime Affairs vessel pending arrival of PCG-NG boats starting 2025 P720 based in Lorient; P722 in Pointe à Pitre
Jonquille class		Patrol boat	P721 Jonquille; P723 Jasmin	98 tonnes	P721 based in Toulon; P723 in Papeete
Maroni class		Patrol boat	P692 Maroni; P693 Oyapock; P694 Aber Ildut	72.5 tonnes	Based in English Channel/North Sea region: Cherbourg, Dunkirk and Boulogne-sur-Mer
Elorn class		Patrol craft	P601 Elorn; P602 Verdon; P603 Adour; P604 Scarpe; P605 Vertonne; P606 Dumbéa; P607 Yser; P608 Argens; P609 Hérault; P610 Gravona; P611 Odet; P612 Maury; P613 Charente; P614 Tech; P615 Penfeld; P616 Trieux; P617 Vésubie; P618 Escaut; P619 Huveaune; P620 Sèvre; P621 Aber Wrac'h; P622 Esteron; P623 Mahury; P624 Organabo	41 tonnes	As of 2023: 11 units reported based in the Atlantic/English Channel/North Sea region; 7 in the Mediterranean; 2 in French Guiana; 2 in Mayotte; 1 in New Caledonia (one vessel - Mahury, P623 - reported unserviceable as of late 2022; Odet and Verdon - P602 & P611 - reportedly damaged "beyond repair" in Mayotte by Cyclone Chido in December 2024; replaced by P603 Adour in early 2025)
Pavois class		Patrol craft	P692 Pavois; P693 Ecu; P964 Rondache; P695 Harnois; P696 Haubert; P697 Heaume; P698 Brigantine; P699 Gantelet	10.2 tonnes	All boats in service since 2011; reported based in: Le Havre (2 units), Port de Bouc (2 units), Marseille, Cherbourg, Brest and Toulon
Armet class		Training vessel	P801 Armet	17.2 tonnes	Assigned to the maritime gendarmerie training center in Toulon

== See also ==
- Coastguard Service of the French Customs
- Directorate general for Maritime affairs, Fisheries and Aquaculture
- Société Nationale de Sauvetage en Mer
- Brigades nautiques et fluviales
