= Coastguard Service of the French Customs =

Coastguard Service of the French Customs Service garde-côtes de la douane française
- Ensign

Agency overview
- Formed: 1681
- Employees: 900

Jurisdictional structure
- Operations jurisdiction: France
- Legal jurisdiction: As per operations jurisdiction
- Specialist jurisdictions: Coastal patrol, marine border protection, marine search and rescue; Customs, excise, gambling

Operational structure
- Headquarters: Le Havre
- Elected officer responsible: Gabriel Attal, Junior Minister for the Budget, Ministry of Economics and Finance
- Agency executives: State Administrator-General Ronan BOILLOT, Director of the National Directorate of the Coastguard of the French Custom Service; Administrator of Customs and Indirect Taxes Frédérique LOUIS, Assistant Director
- Parent agency: Directorate-General of Customs and Indirect Taxes
- Services: French West Indies and French Guiana; English Channel and North Atlantic; Mediterranean Sea

Facilities
- Patrol boats: 31
- Helicopters: 7
- Aeroplanes: 7

The Coastguard Service of the French Customs is a civil administration in charge of the surveillance and protection of the maritime border of France. It ensures a wide variety of offshore and semi-offshore missions, including tax and environmental missions, but also the fight against fraud and offering public service at sea. It also exercises customs and tax control at the maritime borders of the European Union.

== Mission ==
The Coastguard Service of the French Customs implements, throughout the national territory, excluding the area of competence of the regional directorate of customs and indirect rights of Mayotte, the maritime and land surveillance missions of the customs administration requiring the use of maritime and air means. It contributes to the action of the State at sea and to the coast guard function and participates, within this framework, in national and international missions.

== Organization ==
The Coastguard Service of the French Customs is a service with national competence which brings together, since July 1, 2019, under a unified command, the various services in charge of the strategic and operational management of the aero-maritime means of the French Customs. Established on all of France's coastlines and French West Indies and in French Guiana, it is led by a headquarters at Le Havre, governing and coordinating the three Coast Guard Services based in Nantes, Marseille and Fort-de-France.

== Vessels and aircraft ==
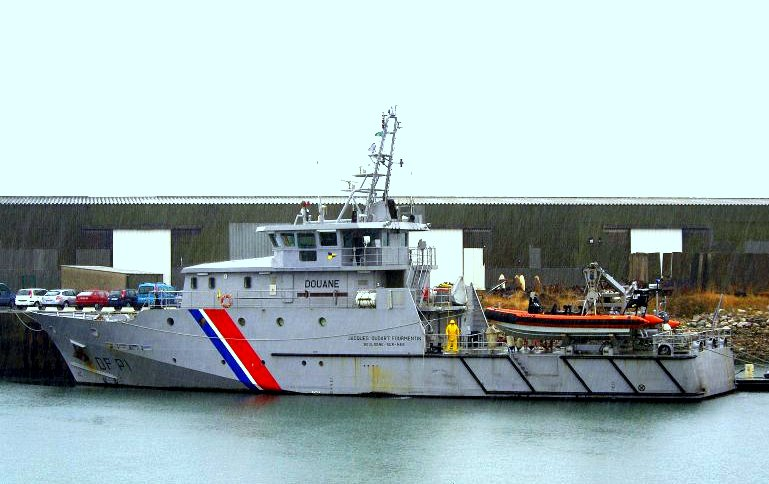
The French customs coastguard patrol boat Jacques Oudart Fourmentin based in the port of Boulogne-sur-Mer.

In order to carry out its missions, the Coastguard Service of the French Customs has intervention and interception resources, including 18 speedboats and patrol boats sailing within 200 nautical miles and 13 coastal speedboats that operate within a radius of 20 nautical miles. These naval resources are informed by an aircraft component with an autonomy of more than 04h30 of flight and high-performance sensors, capable of working in depth and readjusting, in real time, the naval system in the light of the threats identified. The helicopter component participates in the support of coastal and semi-offshore resources by allowing repositioning of resources, ensuring close monitoring of targets and contributing to their interception. Coastguard planes and helicopters remain, moreover, fully mobilized by land Customs in order to respond to national territory protection and surveillance missions.

== Personnel ==
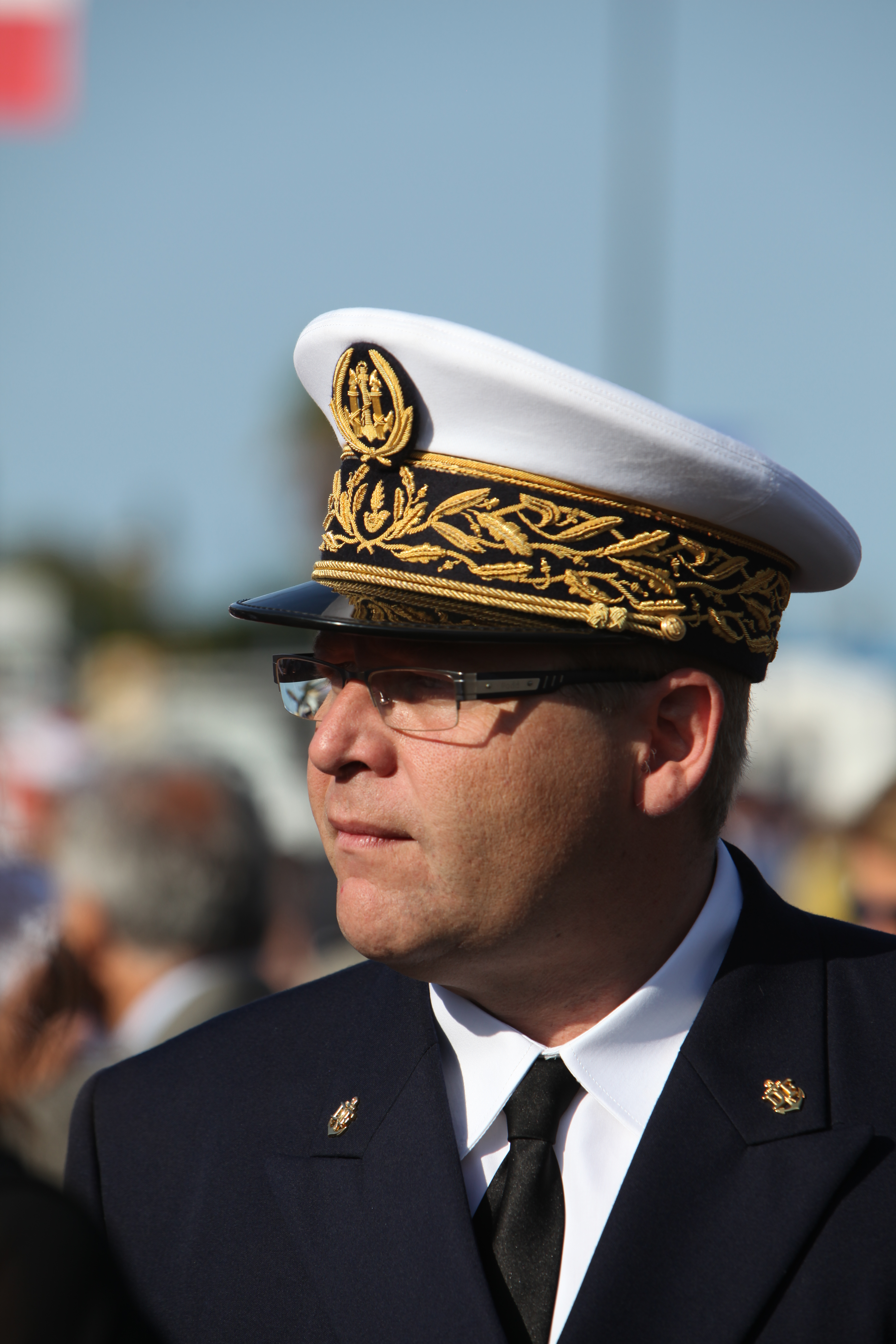
Senior officer of the French Customs Coast Guard Service.

With nearly 900 agents in areas ranging from the maintenance of resources to their operational use, including the analysis of maritime information, the Coastguard Service of the French Customs participates in the fight against large trafficking and is part of the State Action at Sea (AEM) system led by the Maritime Prefects of Brest, Cherbourg and Toulon as well as the Government Delegates for State Action at Sea in the French West Indies.

Customs agents category A (inspecteur des douanes ) are recruited from holders of a bachelor's degree; category B from holders of a high school diploma giving access to university studies; category C from holders of a vocational high school diploma.

The different positions of customs agents at sea are:

- Diver (B, C)
- Seaman (B, C)
- Engineer (B)
- Second in command (B)
- Watch-keeping officer (B)
- Commanding officer (A, B)

== See also ==
- Directorate general for Maritime affairs, Fisheries and Aquaculture
- Maritime Gendarmerie
- Société Nationale de Sauvetage en Mer
