= Yann Tainguy =

French admiral

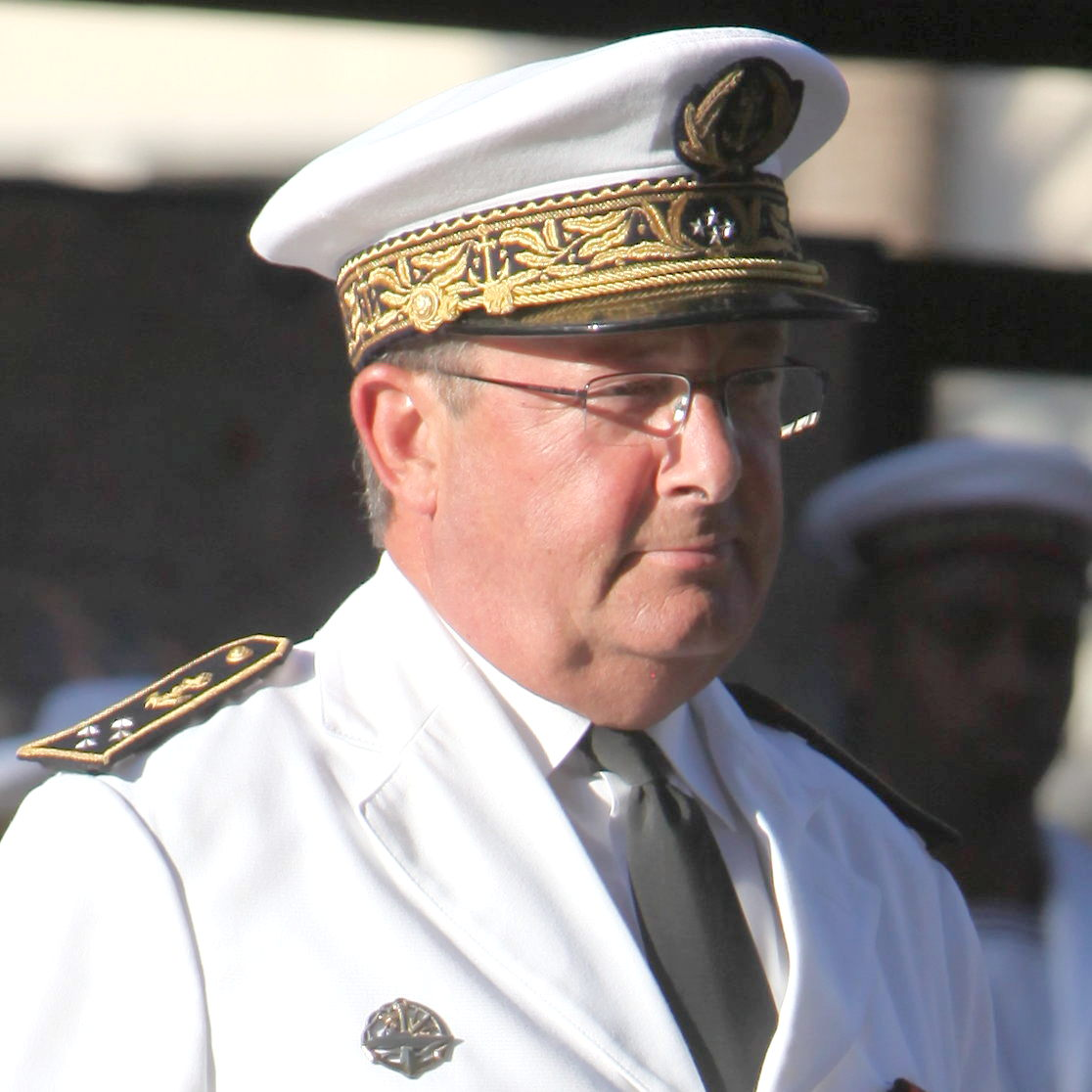
- Admiral Yann Tainguy at a ceremony of the 14th of July 2011 in Toulon.
- Born: 24 August 1955 (age 70)
- Allegiance: French Fifth Republic
- Branch: Navy
- Service years: 1974-present
- Rank: Admiral
- Commands: La Boudeuse, Prairial (F731), Jean Bart (D615)
- Awards: Officer of the Légion d'honneur

Yann Tainguy (born 24 August 1955) is a French admiral, as of 2015 commanding officer for the Mediterranean maritime defence zone and Maritime Prefect for the Mediterranean.

== Sources and references ==
- Amiral Yann Tainguy, Préfecture maritime de la Méditerranée
