= Société Nationale de Sauvetage en Mer =

Sea rescue organization in France

Société nationale de sauvetage en mer
- Abbreviation: SNSM
- Formation: 1967
- Type: Life savers
- Legal status: NGO
- Purpose: The SNSM is the charity that saves lives at sea
- Headquarters: Paris
- Region served: France
- Official language: French
- President: Emmanuel de Oliveira
- Budget: €20.2 million
- Staff: 1,200
- Volunteers: 5,800
- Website: www.snsm.org

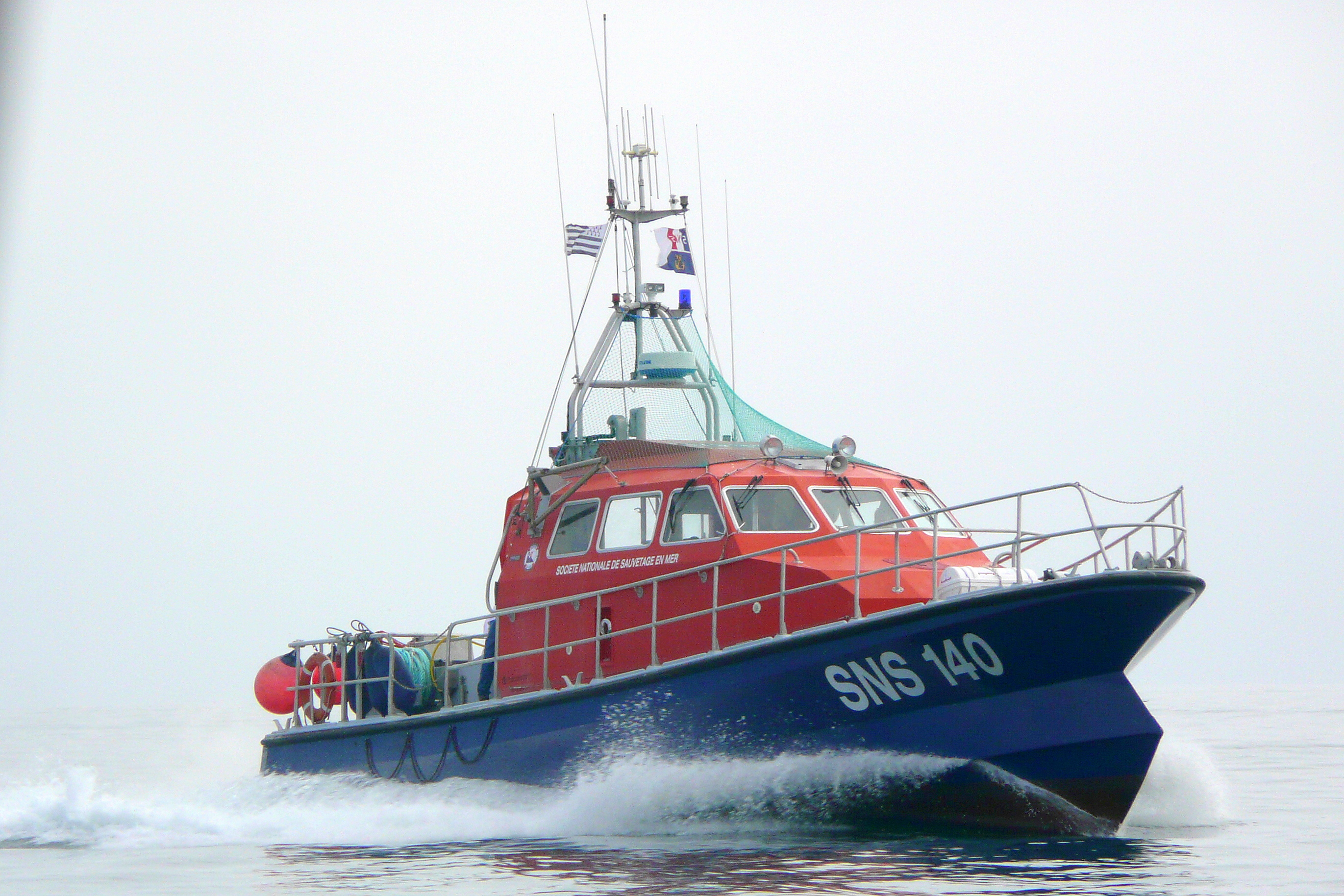
First class swift boat

The Société Nationale de Sauvetage en Mer (SNSM) is a French voluntary organisation founded in 1967 by merging the Société Centrale de Sauvetage des Naufragés (founded in 1865) and the Hospitaliers Sauveteurs Bretons (1873). Its task is saving lives at sea around the French coast, including the overseas départments and territories.

In 2009 the SNSM was responsible for about half of all sea rescue operations and saved 5,400 lives in 2,816 call-outs and assisted 2,140 boats in distress. 65% of funding comes from the private sector (donations, bequests and sponsorship) and 35% comes from the national government, the regions, the départements and the local communities.

== Fleet ==
The SNSM has the following boats:

40 All weather lifeboats
34 Class 1 lifeboats (up to 40 knots/force 8)
76 Class 2 lifeboats (up to 33 knots/force 7)
20 Class 4 lifeboats
425 Inshore lifeboats (including jetskis)

All these boats are unsinkable by injection into the hull of closed cell polyurethane foam in reserved spaces, this material is very light compared to water (about 30 times less heavy): with these buoyancy reserves, the boat itself full of water always remains in positive buoyancy; they also have a tight sealed compartment. All-weather lifeboats from 15 meters to 18 meters are self-righting. The first class lifeboat have capacities close to the all-weather rescue boats, the second class lifeboat are intended for slightly less difficult conditions. The first and second class lifeboat, respectively 14 meters and 12 meters, which are the most recent boats, are self-righting, these boats having an all weather type design. The boats are dispersed in 185 stations (including 15 in overseas territories).

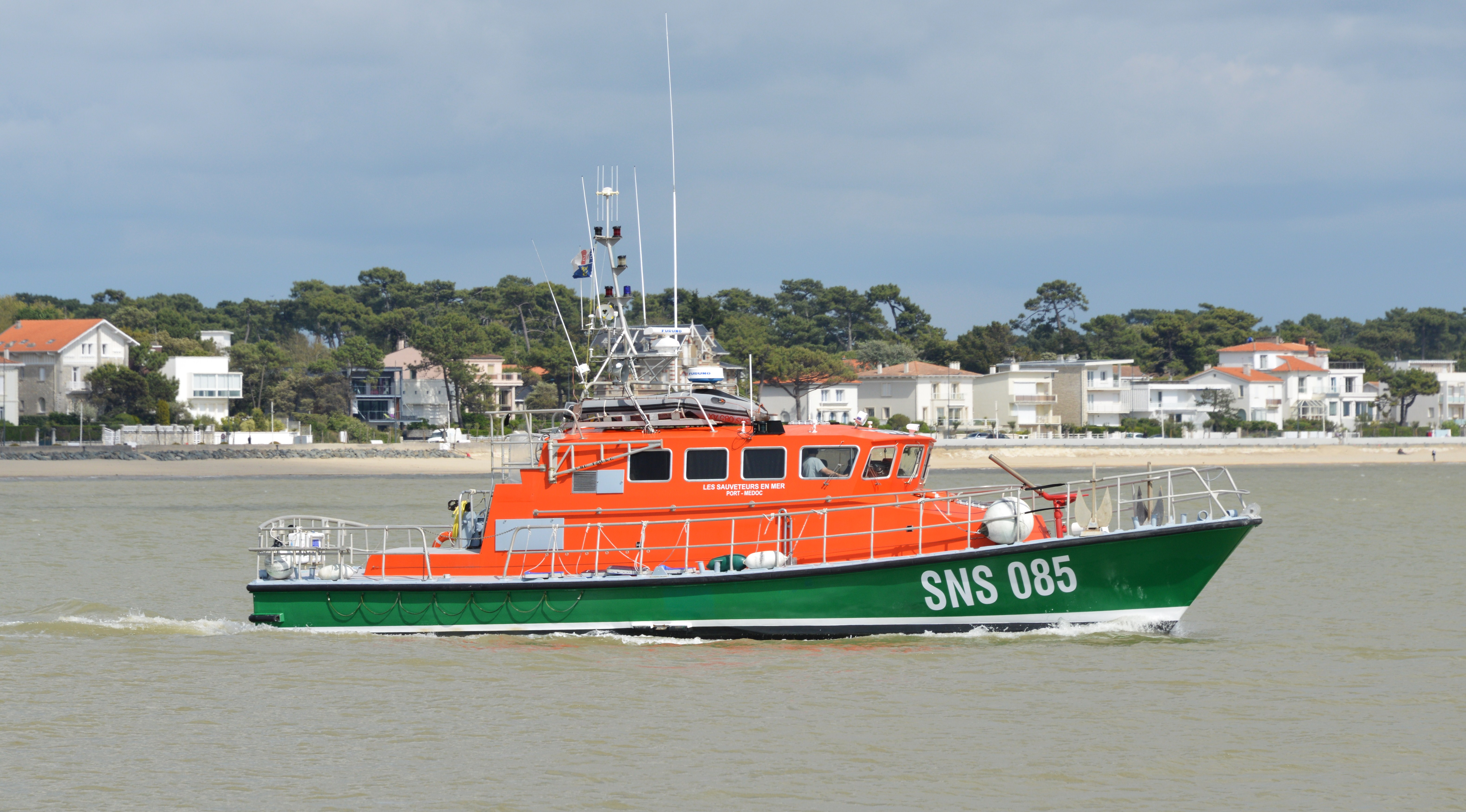
An all-weather rescue boat, unsinkable and self-righting.

== Incidents ==
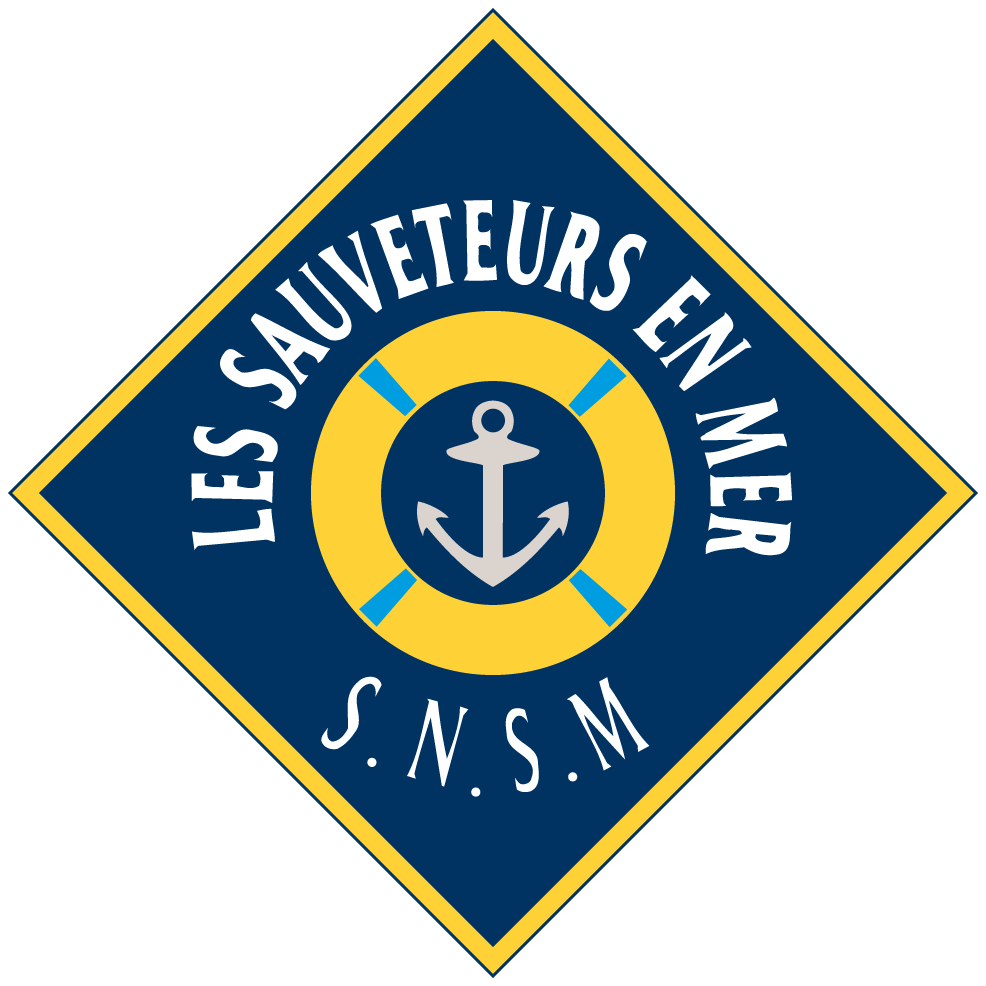
SNSM logo from 1967 to 2022

On 7 Jun 2019, the lifeboat Jack Morisseau set out to rescue a fishing vessel in distress during a storm off the Atlantic coast of France. Twenty minutes after launch, someone reported that the lifeboat was upside down on rocks close to its launch point in Les Sables-d'Olonne. Three of the crew died, one was airlifted out of the sea and three others swam to shore. The fisherman was unaccounted for.

== See also ==
- Coast Guard Function (France)
- Coastguard Service of the French Customs
- Directorate general for Maritime affairs, Fisheries and Aquaculture
- Maritime Gendarmerie
