= Directorate general for Maritime affairs, Fisheries and Aquaculture =

French executive agency

The Directorate general for Maritime affairs, Fisheries and Aquaculture (DGAMPA) (La direction générale des affaires maritimes, de la pêche et de l'aguaculture) is a French executive agency created in 2022. It comes under the authority of the State Secretariat for the Sea and the Ministry of Agriculture and Food Sovereignty. The DGAMPA merges the two main directorates dealing with the maritime sector at the central level of the government, namely the Directorate of maritime affairs (DAM) and the Directorate of maritime fisheries and aquaculture (DPMA), but also the staff of the captaincies of the state ports. Éric Banel was appointed the first Director General of Maritime Affairs, Fisheries and Aquaculture by the Council of Ministers.

== Mission ==
The creation of the DGAMPA aims to consolidate the means allocated to the sea and to improve the visibility of maritime issues within the government. The goal of the new organization is to meet the challenges of maritime planning and the sustainable development of the blue economy, but also to support the ecological and energy transition of maritime activities, promote knowledge of the marine environment and encourage innovation. The purpose of this new agency is to make it possible to better support changes in maritime transport, fishing and aquaculture as well as the shipbuilding industry. The objective is also to improve the development of data and maritime services, consolidate surveillance capacities, increase the efficacy of rescue and control at sea and, more generally, to support territorial projects, promote maritime employment and more effectively defend the French maritime interests domestically and internationally. DGAMPA is a pariticipating agency of the coast guard function.

== Organization ==
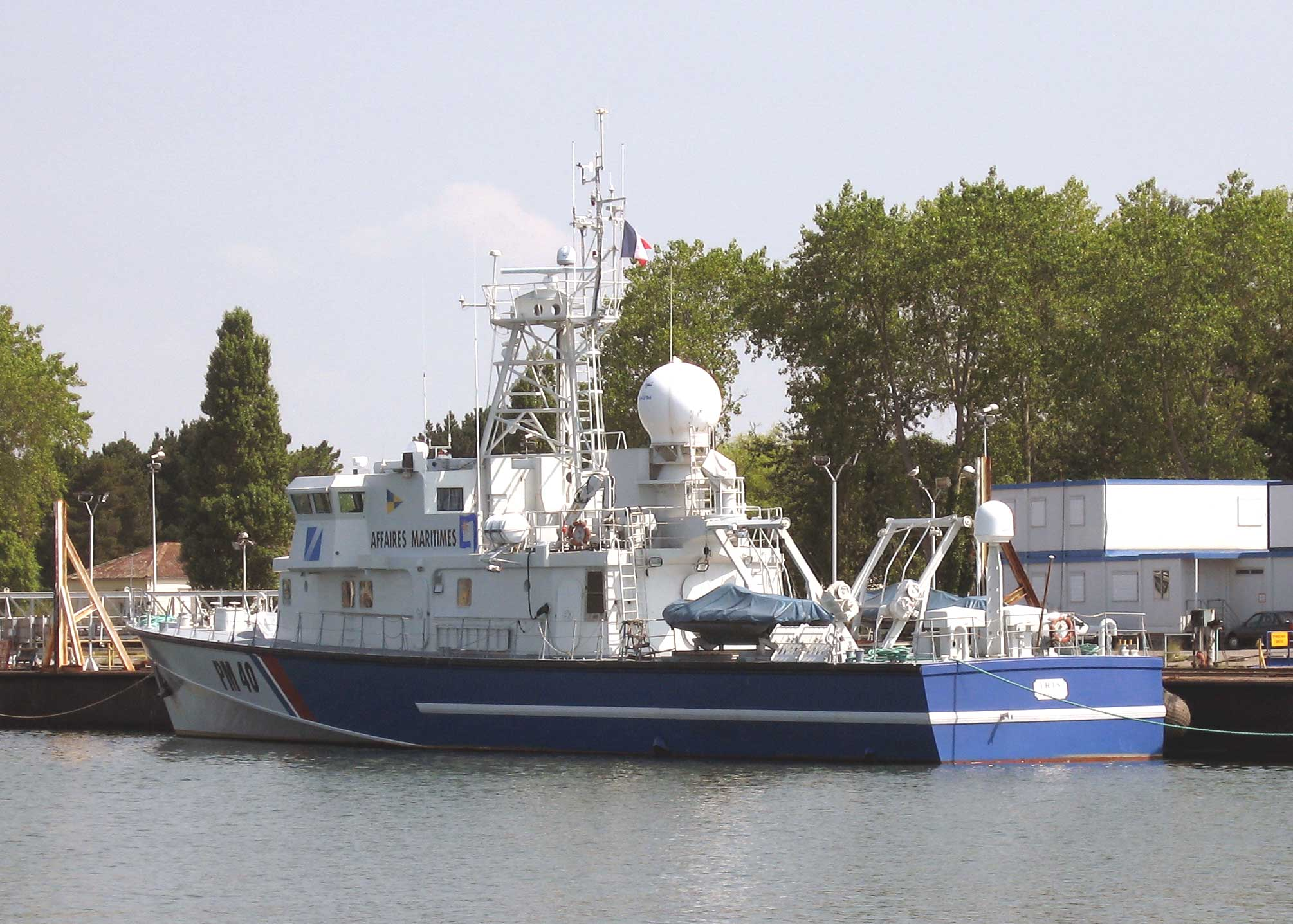
Patrol boat Iris

Leadership

- Director General: Éric Banel, General Administrator of Maritime Affairs
- Assistant Director General: Noémie Le Quellenec, Chief Engineer of Bridges, Water and Forests
- Director of the project implementation and follow-up of the French Presidency of the Council of the European Union: Matthias Bigorgne, Chief Maritime Affairs Administrator

Organizational elements

- Cabinet
- Services and human resources
- Budget and acquisition
- Superior Council of Seafarers (secretariat)
- Sustainable Marine Fisheries and Aquaculture Service
- Fleet and Marine Service
- Maritime and Coastal Areas Service
- Information System Sub-Directorate
- National School of Maritime Safety and Administration (ENSAM)

== Personnel ==
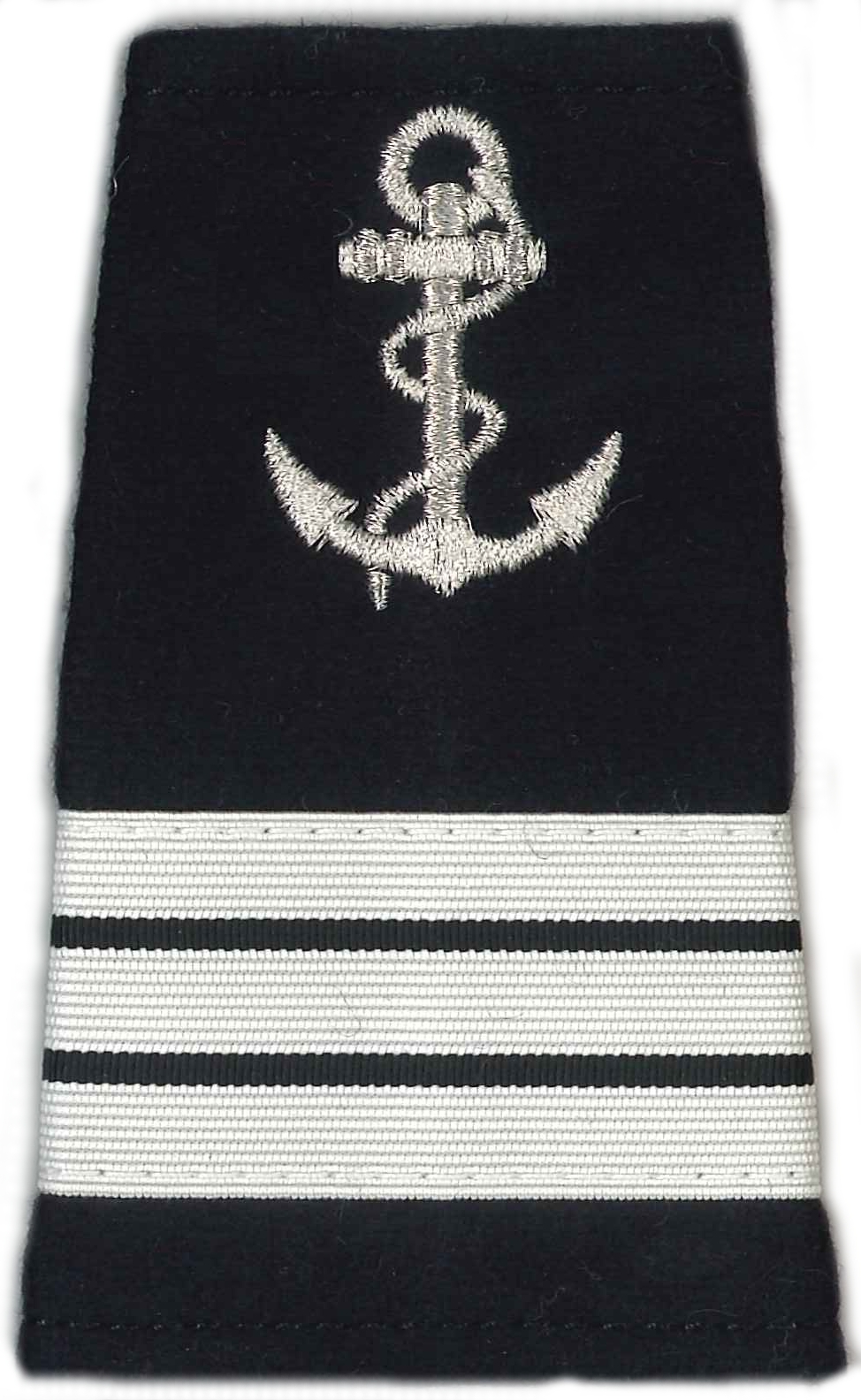
Rank insignia of a Senior Chief Technician for Sustainable Development as Controller of Maritime Affairs.

The 300 employees of the central organization of DGAMPA are mainly located at the Séquoia tower in La Défense, but they are also present in Saint-Malo (information systems and pleasure tax desk), Marseille (one-stop shop for the French international register), Nantes (office of maritime examinations), Brest (maritime pollution national center of expertise), Le Havre (ENSAM), Quimper (maintenance of lighthouses and beacons), Toulouse and Gris-Nez (search and rescue at sea).

The 2,800 employees in charge of maritime activities in the decentralized services will have a unified management at the central level, whether they serve in the interregional directorates for the sea, the sea and coast delegations of the departments of France, or overseas. The DGAMPA will also oversee Ifremer, FranceAgriMer, the National Establishment for Marine Invalids (ENIM), the French Maritime Academy (ENSM) and vocational maritime schools. The DGAMPA will in addition have authority over the National School for Maritime Security and Administration (ENSAM).

The Corps of Maritime Affairs Administrators is a military corps of senior government officials belonging to the French Navy, responsible for designing and implementing all maritime public policies. The corps comprises 335 administrators, posted in Paris, throughout the French coastline and overseas territories, in French embassies abroad, in community bodies and agencies, or in cooperation with foreign administrations.

Within the Maritime Administration, members of the Public Works Engineering Corps (a corps category A) primarily serve as ship safety inspectors and managers of lighthouse and beacon service. Senior technicians of sustainable development (TSDD) (category B) serves within the Maritime administration as Controllers of Maritime Affairs; as such they man the control and surveillance system (patrol boats and coastal units), they ensure the implementation of regulations on marine cultivation and the protection of the environment at sea, and they can also act as ship safety inspectors, particularly to monitor technical and environmental standards on ships flying the French flag. Secretaries of administration and control of sustainable development (SACDD) (category B) can be assigned to all administrative departments of the maritime administration. They can deal with matters of maritime training, management of sailors and ships, pleasure boating, maritime economics, fisheries management, management of the maritime public domain, marine environment and more. The Corps of Seafarer's Syndics (category C) is the historic basic category of the maritime administration. Its members hold technical or administrative functions in the same services as those listed for the TSDD and the SACDD.

== See also ==
- General Inspectorate of Maritime Affairs
- Coastguard Service of the French Customs
- Maritime Gendarmerie
- Société Nationale de Sauvetage en Mer
